= Manguri =

Manguri may refer to:

- Manguri, South Australia, a town in Australia
- Manguri Siding, a railway station in Australia
