= Manguri Siding =

Railway siding in South Australia

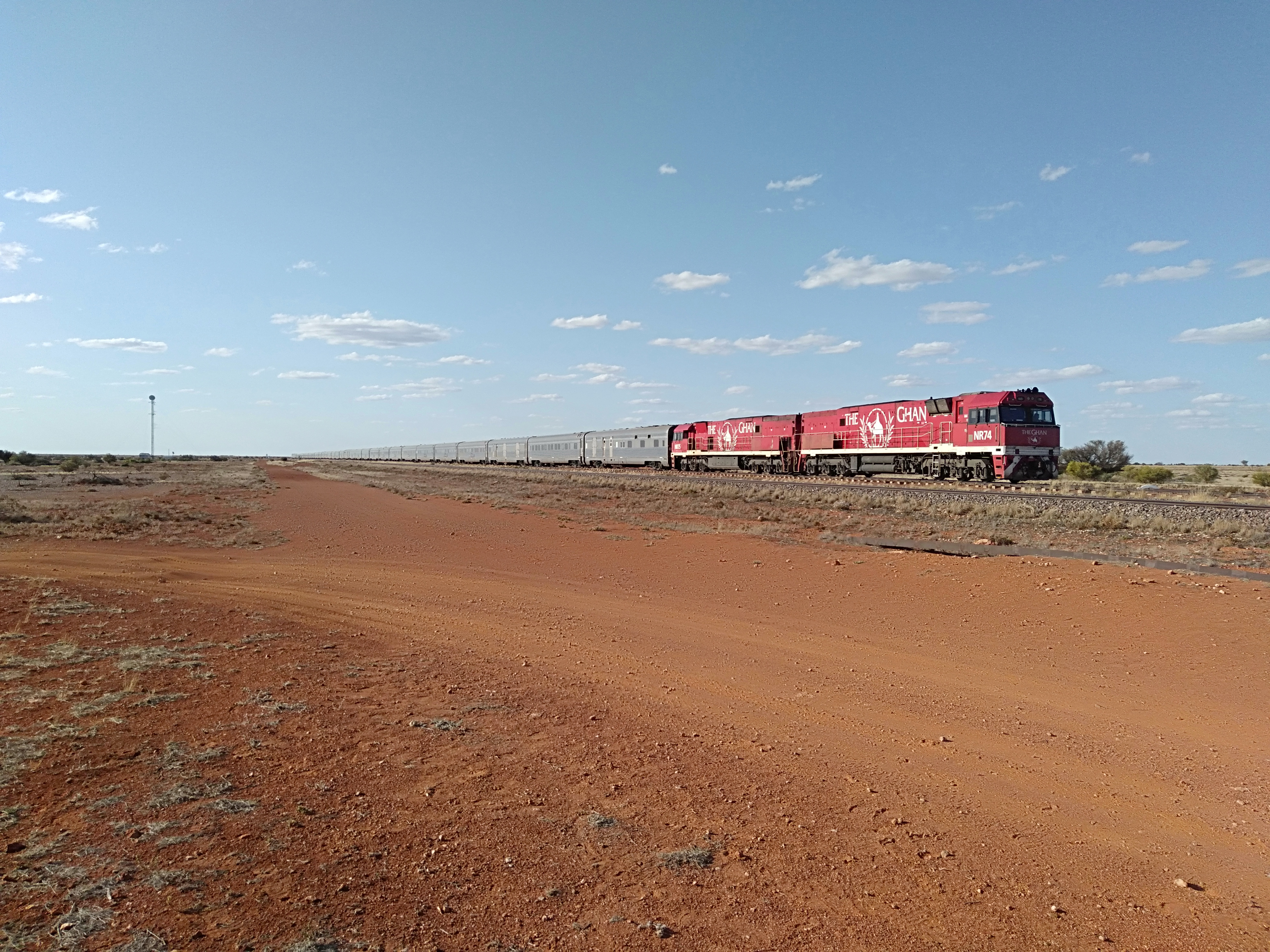
- The Ghan at Manguri Siding in 2022

General information
- Location: Mount Clarence Station, South Australia
- Coordinates: 28°58′23″S 134°22′21″E
- Line: Adelaide–Darwin rail corridor
- Platforms: 1

History
- Opened: 1980

Services
Preceding station	Journey Beyond	Following station
Alice Springs One-way operation	The Ghan	Adelaide Terminus
Location
- Location within South Australia

Manguri Siding is located in the Adelaide–Darwin rail corridor at the locality of Mount Clarence Station, about 42 kilometres (26 mi) west of the opal mining town of Coober Pedy.

It was one of nine sidings to which names were assigned in 1978 in connection with the Tarcoola to Alice Springs railway, which was completed in 1980.

The weekly experiential tourism train The Ghan stops there for passengers to get off for a full-day excursion to Coober Pedy.
