= Mount Willoughby =

Mount Willoughby may refer to:

- Mount Willoughby Indigenous Protected Area
- Mount Willoughby, South Australia, locality partially coincident with the Indigenous Protected Area
