= Tarcoola railway station =

Railway station in South Australia

Tarcoola
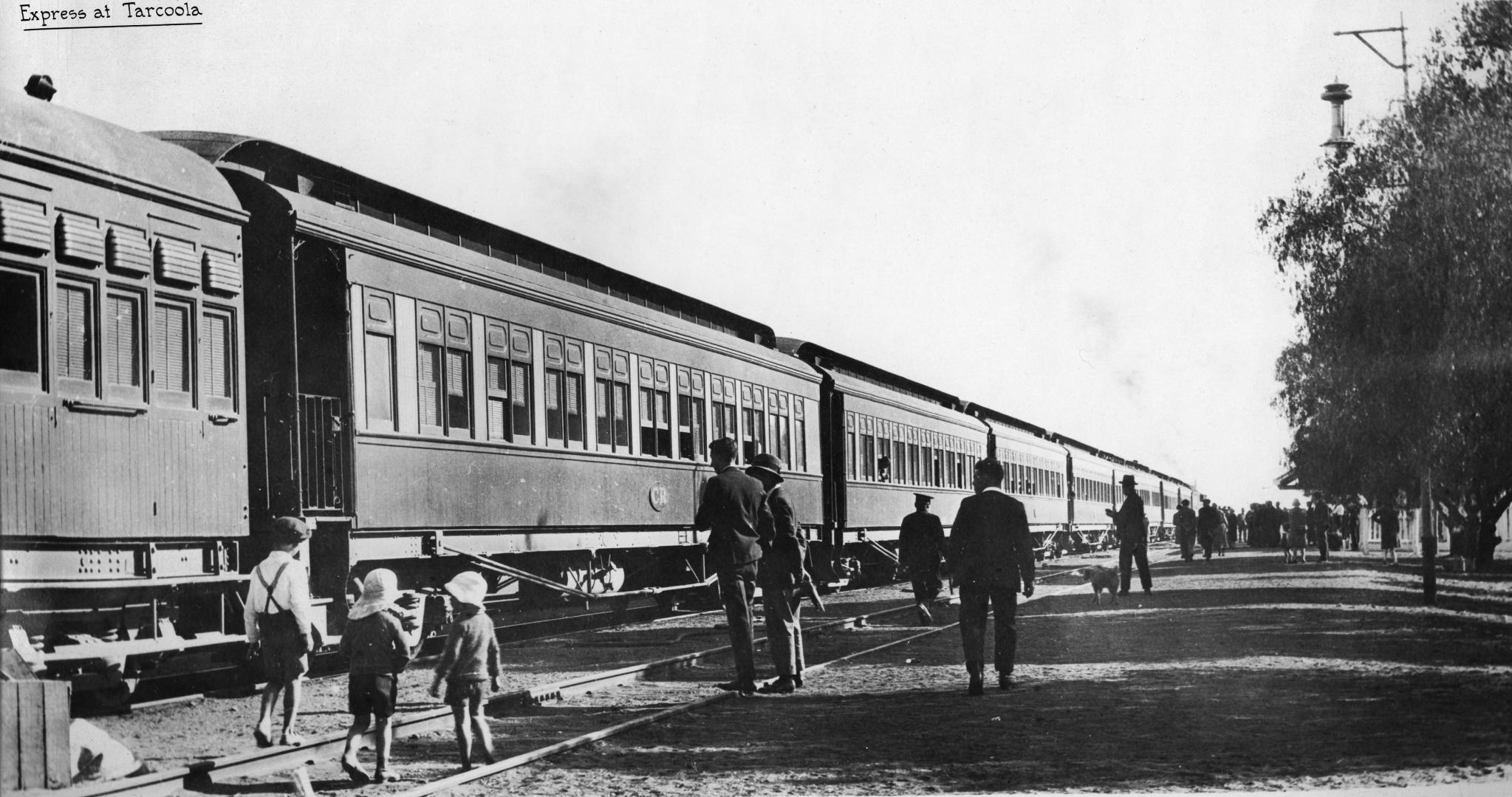
- Station in the 1920s

General information
- Location: Railway Terrace, Tarcoola; Australia
- Coordinates: 30°42′50″S 134°34′01″E
- Line: Trans-Australian Railway
- Platforms: 1

Construction
- Structure type: Ground

Other information
- Status: Permanently Closed
Location

Tarcoola railway station is a railway station in the Australian state of South Australia located on the Trans-Australian Railway in the state's west. It serves the town of Tarcoola and is the northern junction of the Sydney-Perth and Adelaide-Darwin railways, which share approximately 530 kilometres (329 mi) of track between Tarcoola and Crystal Brook.

== History ==
The Trans-Australian Railway was built through Tarcoola in 1915, and in 1980 it became a junction station when the Adelaide–Darwin railway diverged from Tarcoola to Alice Springs. This was extended to Darwin in 2004. It was initially built as a standard gauge replacement for the Central Australia Railway.

There is a triangular junction at Tarcoola which joins Crystal Brook, Darwin and Perth. Another triangular junction at Crystal Brook joins Tarcoola, Adelaide and Sydney.

The station has two triangles, a smaller one for turning locomotives, and the larger one to the west of the town gives direct access from the Darwin line to the Trans-Australian Railway to Kalgoorlie. The latter has been put out of service.

In 2018, the track between Tarcoola and Adelaide was upgraded from 47 kilograms per metre (95 lb/yd) to 60 kilograms per metre (120 lb/yd) rails. This was done while the track was open for service, with 600 metres (2,000 ft) of rail being replaced at a time between train services. The upgrade increased the maximum permitted axle load by four tonnes.

== Services ==
The Ghan and the Indian Pacific passenger services pass through Tarcoola both running once per week in each direction all year round. The mail for Tarcoola arrives by train.
