= Mount Clarence Station, South Australia =

Mount Clarence Station South Australia
- Coordinates: 29°05′39″S 134°34′29″E
- Population: 10 (shared with other localities) (2016 census) (Note: For the 2016 census, the State Suburb of Mount Clarence Station covered an area consisting of the locality of Mount Clarence Station, those parts of the locality of Coober Pedy not included in the State Suburb of Coober Pedy and the western end of the locality of Anna Creek.)
- Established: 26 April 2013
- Postcode(s): 5723
- Time zone: ACST (UTC+9:30)
  - Summer (DST): ACST (UTC+10:30)
- Location: 771 km (479 mi) NW of Adelaide; 37 km (23 mi) W of Coober Pedy
- LGA(s): Pastoral Unincorporated Area
- Region: Far North
- State electorate(s): Giles
- Federal division(s): Grey
Mean max temp	Mean min temp	Annual rainfall
27.8 °C; 82 °F	14.2 °C; 58 °F	133.8 mm 5.3 in
Suburbs around Mount Clarence Station:
Mabel Creek	Mount Willoughby	Mount Willoughby
Mabel Creek	Mount Clarence Station	Coober Pedy
Mabel Creek	Ingomar	Coober Pedy
- Footnotes: Locations; Adjoining localities

Mount Clarence Station is a locality in the Australian state of South Australia located about 771 kilometres (479 mi) north-west of the state capital of Adelaide and about 37 kilometres (23 mi) west of the town of Coober Pedy.

Mount Clarence Station's boundaries were created on 26 April 2013 and given the “local established name” which is derived from the pastoral station of the same name. The term ‘Station’ was included in the name to distinguish it from another places in Australia. Its boundaries align approximately with those of the pastoral station.

The following roads which are maintained by the South Australian government enter the locality from the Stuart Highway to the immediate east of the locality - the Anne Beadell Highway in the south and the Mount Clarence Road in the north. The Anne Beadell Highway continues in its state-maintained form across the railway line and terminates at the Mabel Creek homestead in the north-west after which it continues to the west while the Mount Clarence Road terminates at the Mount Clarence Station homestead.

The Adelaide–Darwin railway passes from south to north through the western side of the locality where a siding named Manguri is located near the site of the government town of Manguri.

The 2016 Australian census which was conducted in August 2016 reports that Mount Clarence Station and parts of localities located to the immediate east shared a population of 10 people.

Mount Clarence Station is located within the federal division of Grey, the state electoral district of Giles, the Pastoral Unincorporated Area of South Australia and the state government region of the Far North.

== Town of Manguri ==
Manguri (28°58′11″S 134°22′39″E) is a town proclaimed by the South Australian government on 8 December 1977. It is located about 36 kilometres (22 mi) west of Coober Pedy on the east side of the Adelaide–Darwin railway. The town occupies a rectangular area with the following gazetted dimensions - 478.42 metres (1,569.6 ft) on its north-west and south-east sides by 484.26 metres (1,588.8 ft) on its north-east and south-west sides. The name is an Aboriginal word previously used for the local railway station and whose meaning is unknown. Since 2013, it has been located within the locality of Mount Clarence Station.
