= Alice Springs railway station =

Railway station in the Northern Territory, Australia

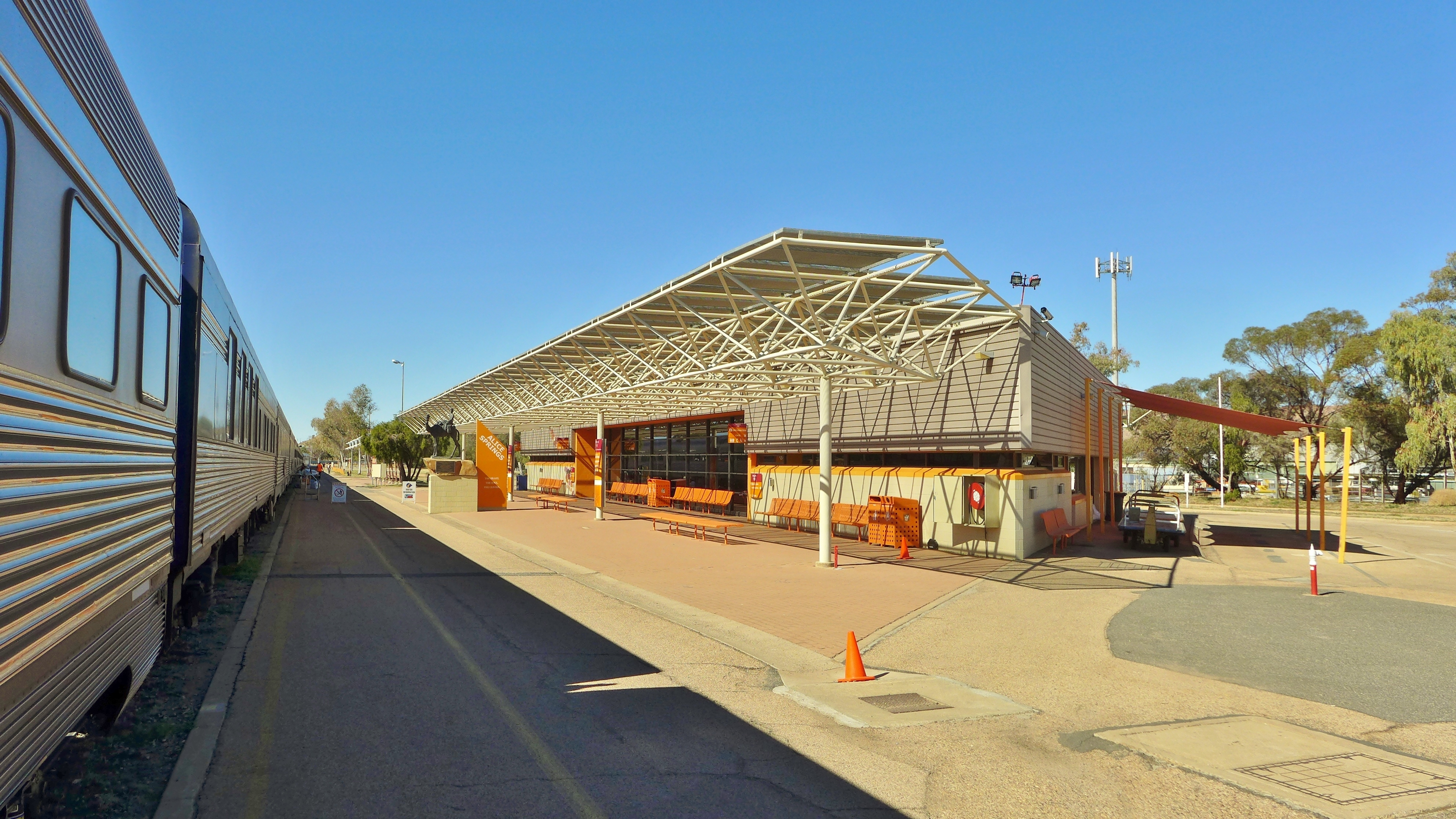
- The Ghan passenger train at Alice Springs station, July 2015

General information
- Location: George Crescent, Alice Springs; Australia
- Coordinates: 23°41′50.7″S 133°52′24.2″E
- Owner: Journey Beyond
- Operator: Journey Beyond
- Line: Adelaide–Darwin railway line
- Distance: 1546 kilometres from Adelaide
- Platforms: 1

Construction
- Structure type: Ground

Other information
- Status: Staffed

History
- Opened: Narrow gauge line (Central Australia Railway): 2 August 1929. Standard gauge line: 9 October 1980.
- Closed: (Central Australia Railway narrow gauge line): 1980
- Former names: Stuart (2 August 1929 to 7 July 1930)

Services
Preceding station	Journey Beyond	Following station
Katherine One-way operation	The Ghan	Coober Pedy towards Adelaide
Katherine towards Darwin	The Ghan	Marla One-way operation
Location

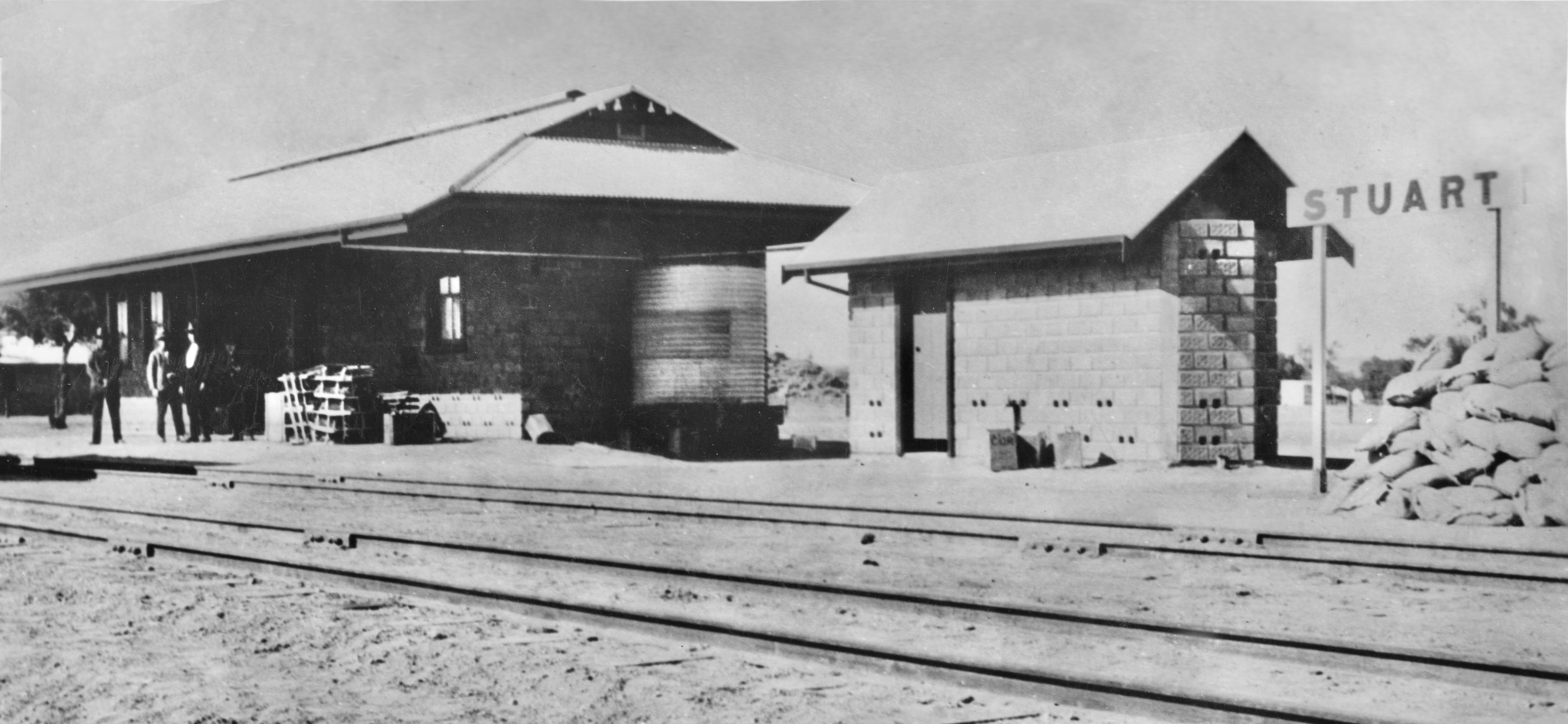
Stuart railway station, terminus of the narrow-gauge Central Australia Railway, in 1929 or 1930 – before it was renamed Alice Springs

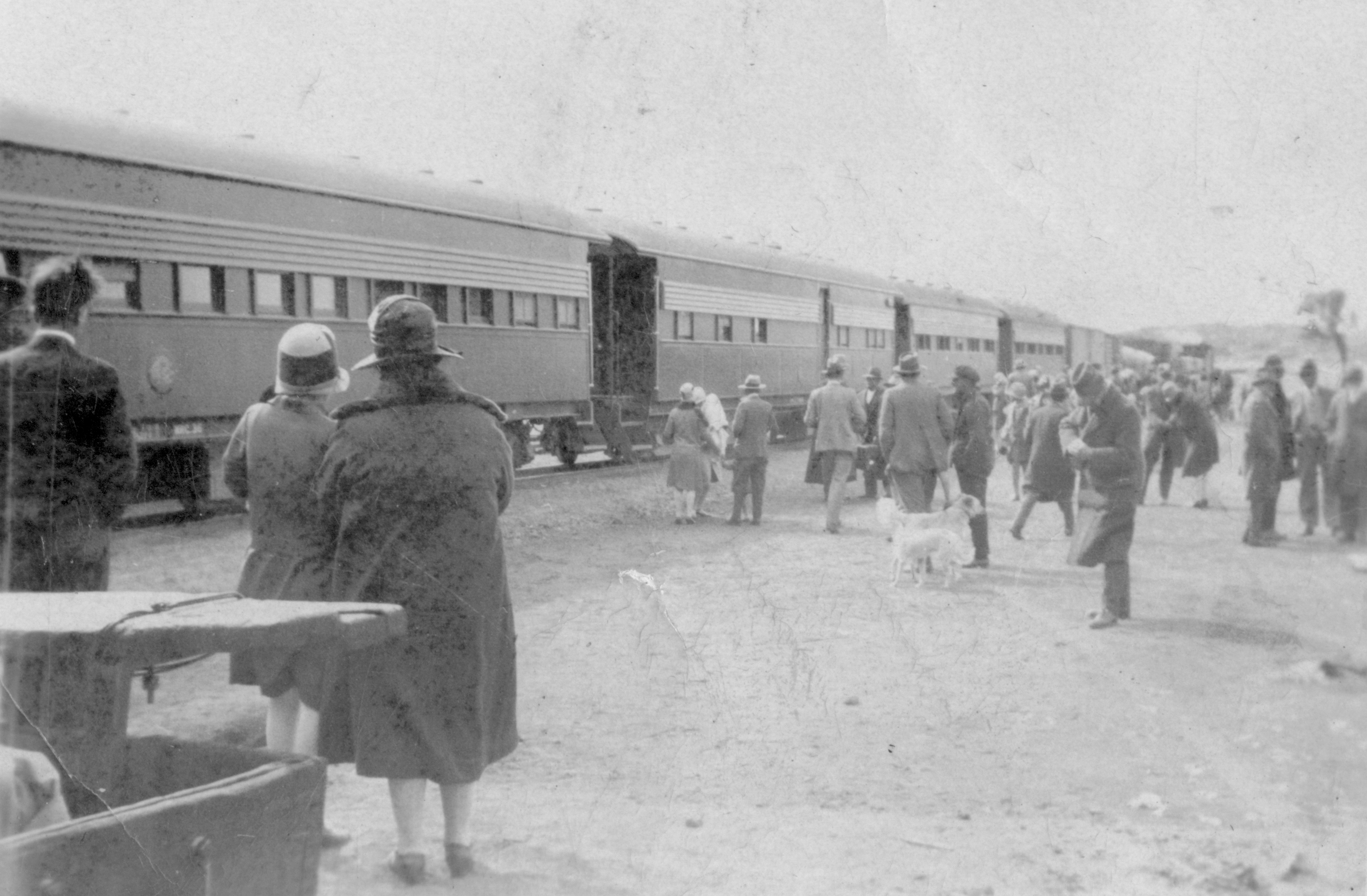
Arrival of the first train at Alice Springs, 6 August 1929

Alice Springs railway station is on the Adelaide–Darwin line in the town of that name.

== History ==
The original railway station, in Railway Terrace, was opened on 2 August 1929, when the 1067 mm (3 ft 6 in) narrow-gauge Great Northern railway was extended there from Oodnadatta and named the Central Australia Railway. For the first 11 months, the station had the same name as the fledgling adjacent township, "Stuart", named after the explorer John McDouall Stuart. However, Australia-wide the locality had become widely known as Alice Springs, the name of the telegraph station 3.5 kilometres (2 miles) to the township's north. Citing that reason, the Commonwealth Railways announced a change to that name on 8 July 1930.

Replacing a wooden structure, the present station servicing the new 1435 mm (4 ft 8 1/2 in) standard-gauge line opened on 9 October 1980 when a new line opened from Tarcoola. The station was included in the sale of Australian National's passenger operations to Great Southern Rail on 1 November 1997. It served as the terminus until the line was extended to Darwin in February 2004.

The building, designed by Adelaide architect Guy Maron, was awarded the Northern Territory Enduring Architecture Award in 2015, 35 years after its opening.

== Station features ==
In the foyer of the current station is a memorial by sculptor Gabriel Sterk commemorating the Afghan cameleers who transported supplies to Central Australia before the building of the railway line.

== Services ==
Alice Springs station is served by The Ghan, which usually operates weekly in each direction.
