= Darwin railway station =

Railway station in the Northern Territory, Australia

Darwin
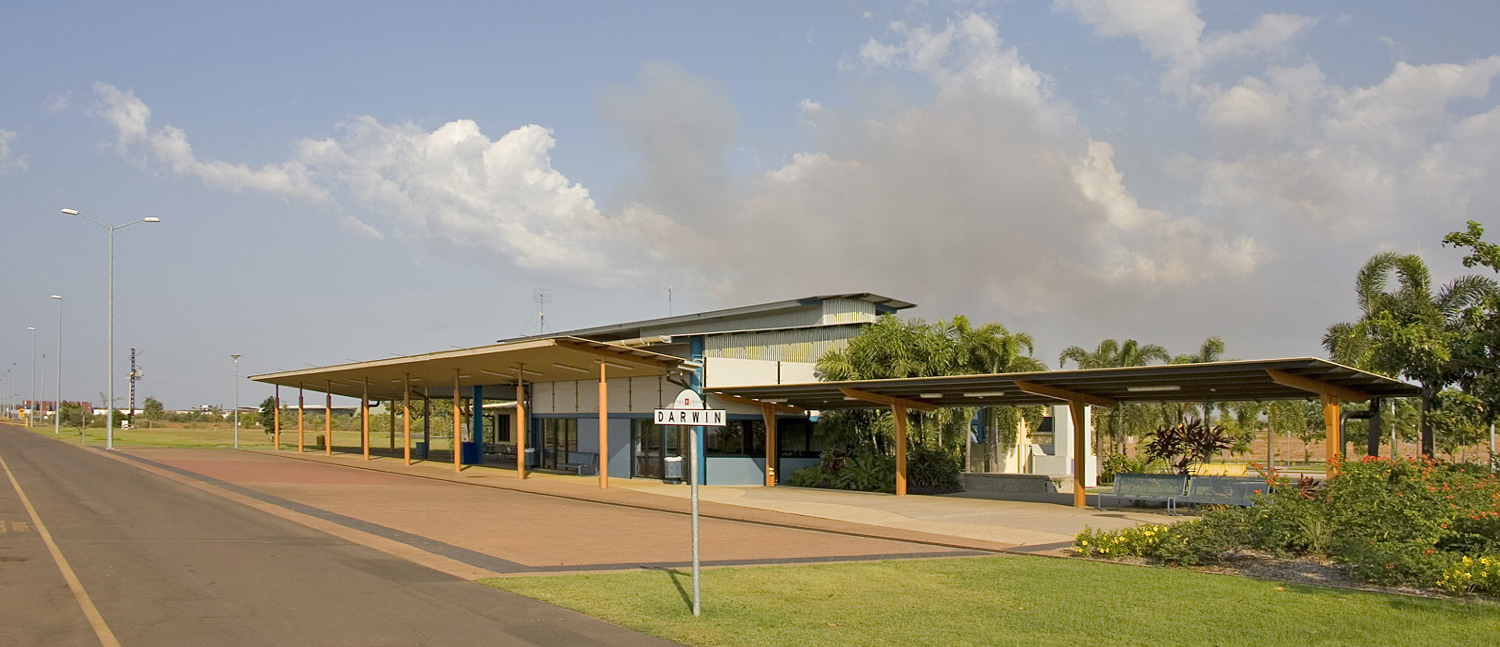
- Darwin's railway station, in 2007

General information
- Location: Saloo Street, East Arm, Northern Territory; Australia
- Coordinates: 12.473°S 130.904°E
- Owner: Journey Beyond
- Line: Adelaide–Darwin railway
- Distance: 2975 kilometres (1849 miles) from Adelaide
- Platforms: 1

Construction
- Structure type: Ground level
- Accessible: No

Other information
- Status: Staffed

History
- Opened: 4 February 2004

Services
Preceding station	Journey Beyond	Following station
Terminus	The Ghan	Katherine towards Adelaide
Location

Darwin railway station, also known as Berrimah Passenger Terminal, is the terminus station of the Adelaide–Darwin rail corridor in the Darwin suburb of East Arm, Northern Territory. The station is 2975 km (1849 mi) from Adelaide Parklands Terminal station, 3.5 km (2.2 mi) from the end of the line and 18 km (11 mi) by road from Darwin's city centre. In front of the station building is a paved area 60 metres (200 feet) long, but sealed hardstanding extends for a kilometre (1100 yards) to accommodate all carriages of the train on the single track. Since this area is not raised, small platforms with stairs are positioned for passengers.

== History ==
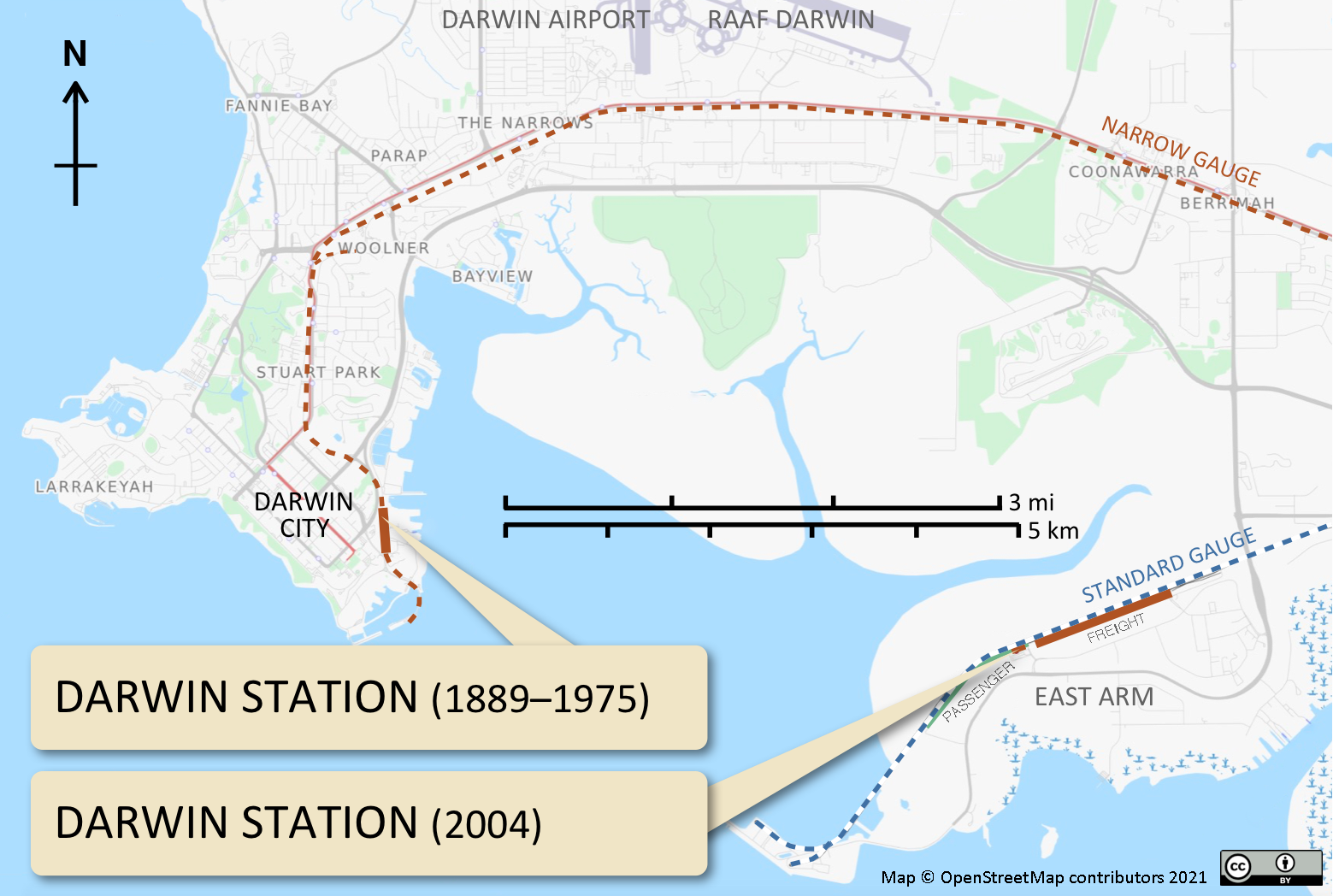
Locations of Darwin's original and current railway stations

From 1889 to 1973, the North Australia Railway ran through Darwin and terminated at its own Darwin station. This station was at a different site to the modern one, near what is now Fishermans Wharf (and like the city, it was known as "Palmerston" until 1911).

The current Darwin station opened on 4 February 2004 when The Ghan operated the first passenger service on the newly constructed line from Alice Springs. In July of that year, a small 0-4-0 steam locomotive, built in 1886 by Baldwin Locomotive Works, was put on display in the station. As the first locomotive in the Northern Territory, it was used during construction of the Palmerston and Pine Creek Railway and for 63 years more on the line. It became known as Sandfly.

In 2008 the NT Motor Vehicle Enthusiasts Club substantially refurbished Sandfly for display, and since 2010 it has been in the former Qantas hangar in Parap alongside the club's historic trucks, traction and stationary engines and fire engines.

== Services ==
The sole passenger train service to and from Darwin is The Ghan, an experiential excursion train that as of 2026 operates weekly between Darwin and Adelaide via Alice Springs.

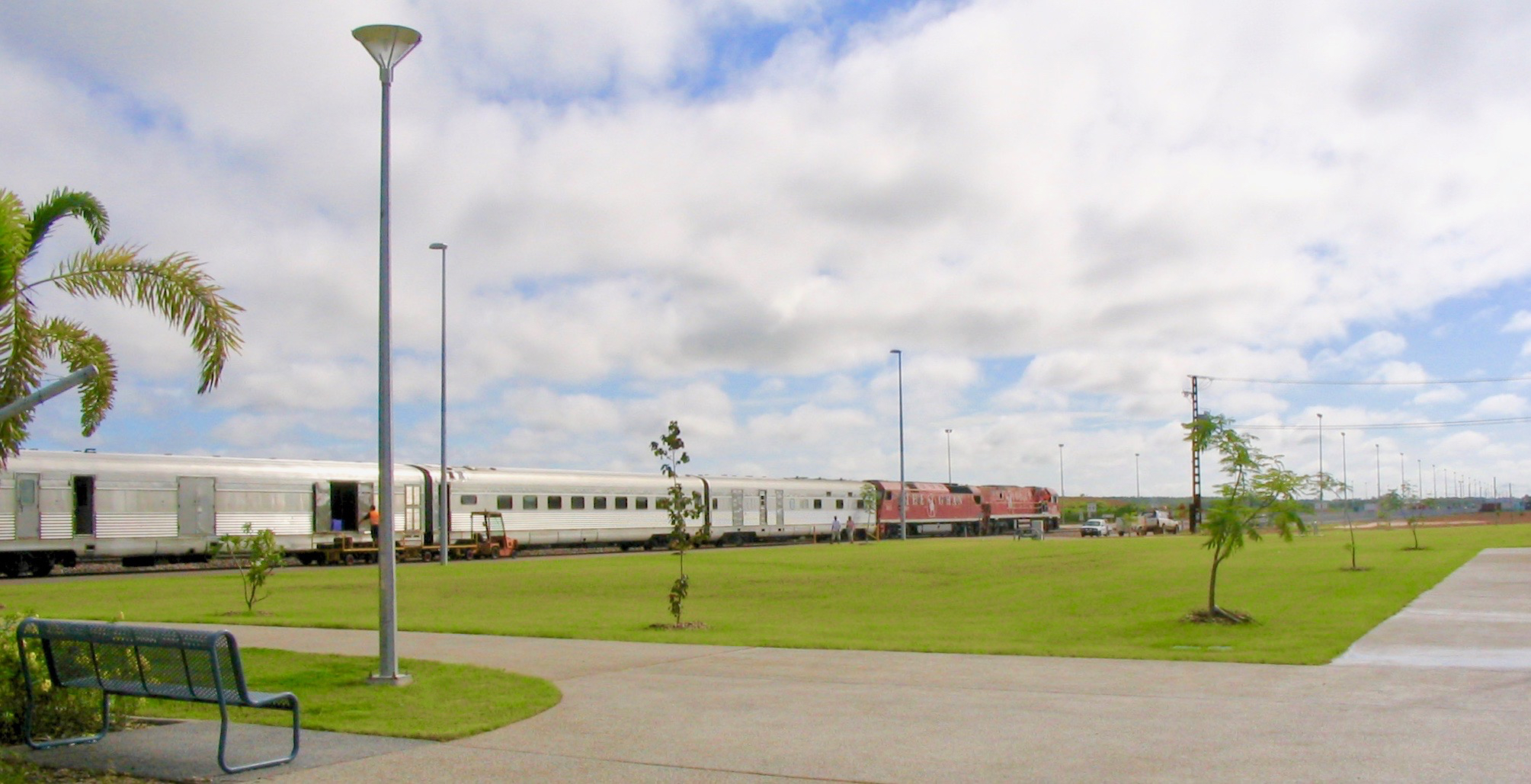
The Ghan experiential tourism train being loaded for its 2975 km (1849 mi) journey to Adelaide
