= The Ghan =

Tourist train in Australia

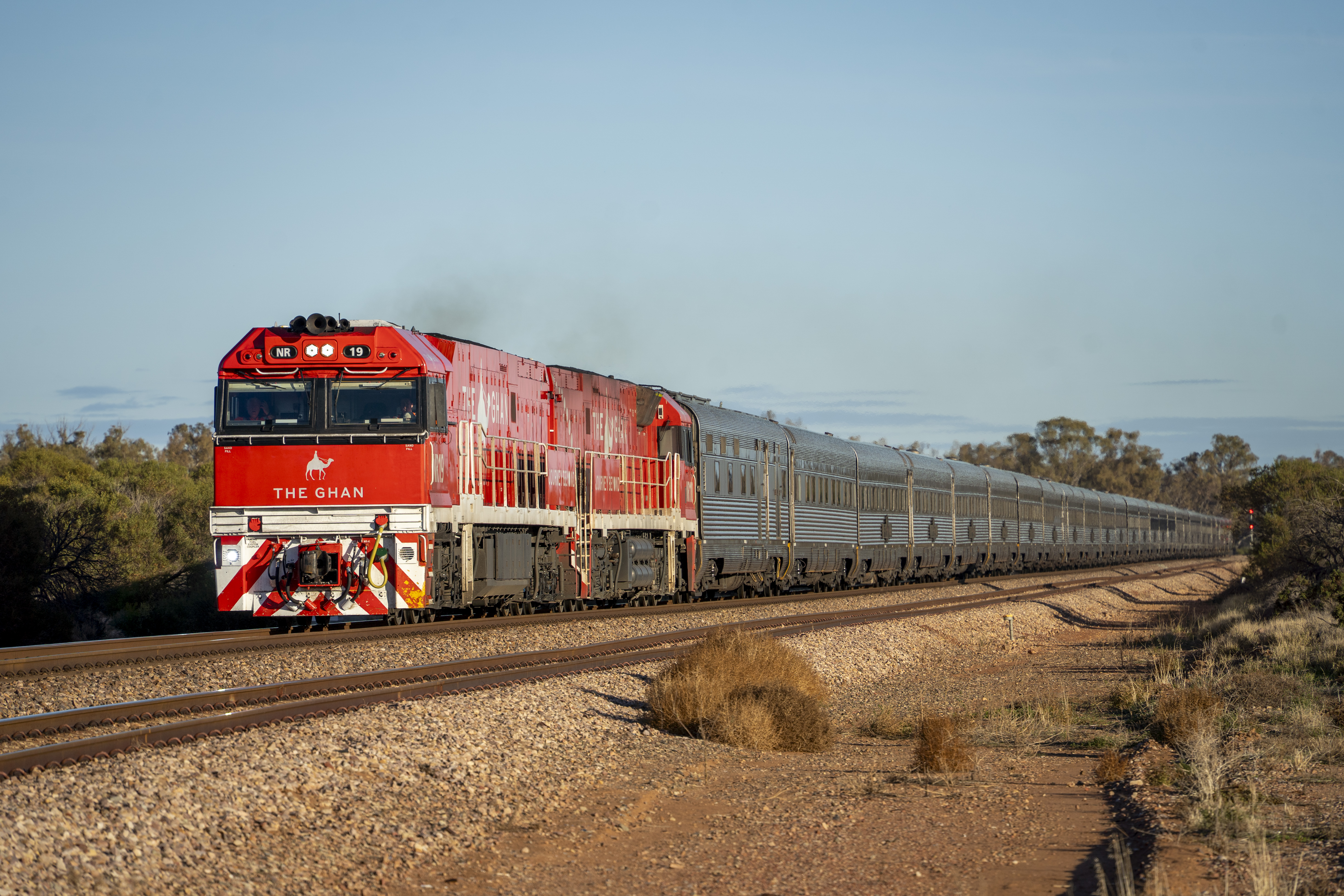
- The Ghan passing through Nectar Brook, South Australia in July 2025

Overview
- Service type: Transcontinental passenger rail
- Status: Operating
- Locale: Australia
- First service: 4 August 1929
- Current operator: Journey Beyond
- Former operators: Commonwealth Railways; Australian National
- Website: journeybeyondrail.com.au/journeys/the-ghan/

Route
- Termini: Adelaide Parklands Terminal; Darwin Berrimah Passenger Terminal
- Distance travelled: 2,979 km (1,851 mi)
- Average journey time: 52 hours 30 minutes (average)
- Service frequency: Weekly
- Line used: Adelaide–Darwin rail corridor

On-board services
- Seating arrangements: All in roomette/twinette compartments
- Sleeping arrangements: Yes
- Auto-rack arrangements: No
- Observation facilities: No dome car
- Entertainment facilities: Piano

Technical
- Rolling stock: Commonwealth Railways stainless steel carriage stock
- Track gauge: 1,435 mm (4 ft 8 1/2 in)
- Average length: 774 m (2,539 ft)

The Ghan (/ɡæn/) is an experiential tourism-oriented passenger train service that operates between the northern and southern coasts of Australia, through the cities of Adelaide, Alice Springs and Darwin on the Adelaide–Darwin rail corridor.

Operated by Adelaide-based Journey Beyond, its scheduled travelling time, including extended stops for passengers to do off-train tours, is 53 hours 15 minutes to travel the 2,979 kilometres (1,851 mi). The Ghan has been described as one of the world's greatest passenger trains.

== Etymology ==
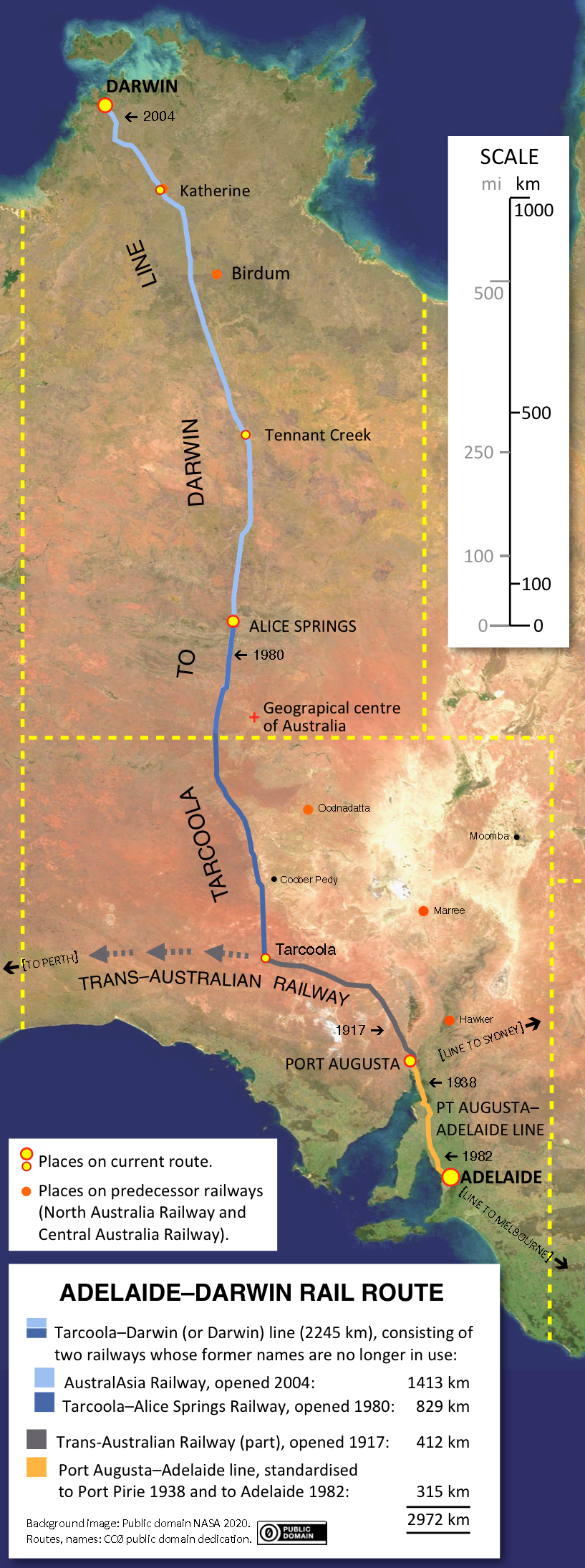
The standard-gauge route of The Ghan (line completed to Darwin in 2004); the former narrow-gauge route (Central Australia Railway, completed to the Alice Springs terminus in 1929); and the standard-gauge line to Marree opened in 1957. Click to enlarge.

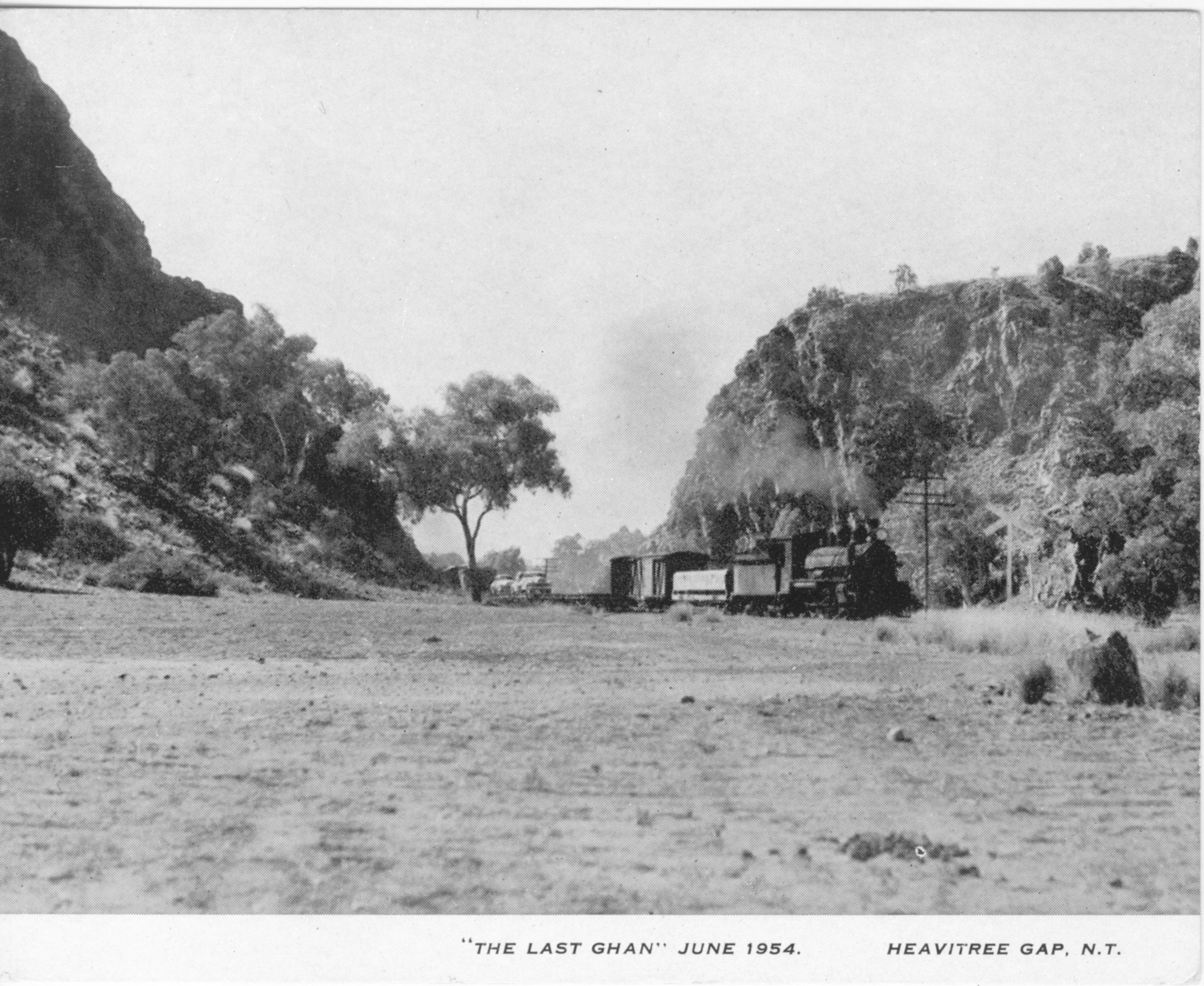
The Ghan passing through Heavitree Gap in Alice Springs (Mparntwe) in June 1954

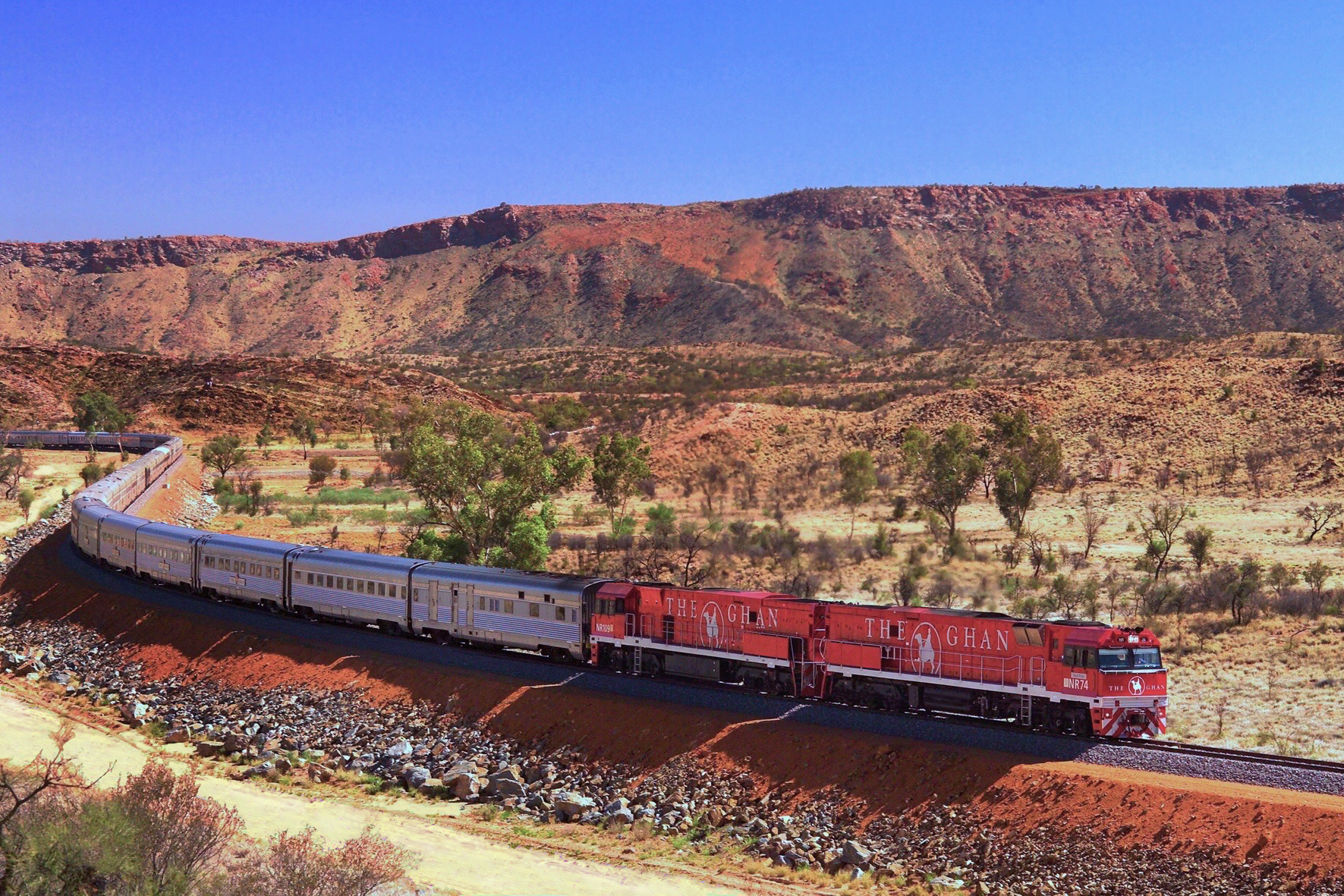
The Ghan is known for travelling through remarkable scenery on its transcontinental journey

The service's name is an abbreviated version of its previous nickname, The Afghan Express. The nickname is reputed to have been bestowed in 1923 by one of its crews. Some suggest the train's name honours Afghan camel drivers who arrived in Australia in the late 19th century to help the British colonists find a way to reach the country's interior.

A contrary view is that the name was a veiled insult. In 1891, the railway from Quorn reached remote Oodnadatta where an itinerant population of around 150 cameleers were based, generically called "Afghans". "The Ghan Express" name originated with train crews in the 1890s as a taunt to officialdom because, when an expensive sleeping car was put on from Quorn to Oodnadatta, "on the first return journey the only passenger was an Afghan", mocking its commercial viability.

As early as 1924, because of the notorious unreliability of this fortnightly steam train, European pastoralists commonly called it "in ribald fashion The Afghan Express". By 1951, when steam engines were replaced by diesel-electric locomotives, this disparaging derivation, like the cameleers, had faded away. Modern marketing has completed the name turnabout.

== Operations ==
The Ghan was privatised in 1997 and has since then been operated by Journey Beyond Rail Expeditions, formerly known as Great Southern Rail, initially as part of the Serco Group. In March 2015, Great Southern Rail was sold to Allegro Funds, a Sydney investment fund.

The train runs at least once-weekly. Until 2016, a second service operated between June and September, recommencing again in May 2019 due to demand. The train stops at Adelaide, Alice Springs, Katherine and Darwin. The stops at Alice Springs and Katherine allow time for passengers to take optional tours.

Each train has an average of 28 stainless steel carriages, built by Comeng, Granville, in the late 1960s and early 1970s for the Indian Pacific, plus a motorail wagon. The average length of the train is 774 metres (2,539 ft). Two Pacific National NR class locomotives haul the train, previously AN class or a DL class locomotives assisted. Locomotive crews are sourced from Pacific National, with the on-train staff employed by Journey Beyond.

== History ==
Starting in August 1929, The Ghan ran on the Central Australia Railway, originally built as a 1,067 mm (3 ft 6 in) narrow-gauge railway to Alice Springs under Chief Engineer, Commonwealth Railways, N. G. Bell. In 1957, the 1,435 mm (4 ft 8 1/2 in) standard gauge Stirling North to Marree line opened, and the Ghan was curtailed to operate only north of Marree.

In October 1980, the remainder of the line was replaced by a standard-gauge line built to the west of the original line. An extension north from Alice Springs to Darwin opened in January 2004.

=== Original Ghan ===
In 1878, construction of what was then known as the Port Augusta to Government Gums Railway began when Premier of South Australia William Jervois broke ground at Port Augusta. The 1067 mm (3 ft 6 in) line reached Hawker in June 1880, Beltana in July 1881, Marree in January 1884 and Oodnadatta in January 1891. Work on the extension to Alice Springs began in 1926, and was completed in 1929. Until then, the final leg of the train journey was still made by camel.

Although there were plans from the beginning to extend the line to Darwin, by the time the extension to Alice Springs had been completed, The Ghan was losing money and the plans for further extension to Darwin were suspended indefinitely. The original Ghan line followed the same track as the overland telegraph, which is believed to be the route taken by John McDouall Stuart during his 1862 crossing of Australia.

The Ghan service was notorious for delays caused by washouts of the track. A flatcar immediately behind the locomotive carried spare sleepers and railway tools, so passengers and crew could repair the line. The very uncertain service via this route was tolerated because steam locomotives needed large quantities of water, and Stuart's route to Alice Springs was the only one that had sufficient available water.

Initially operated fortnightly, in the 1930s, it was increased to weekly. From 1956 until 1975, it operated twice weekly, before reverting to a weekly service.

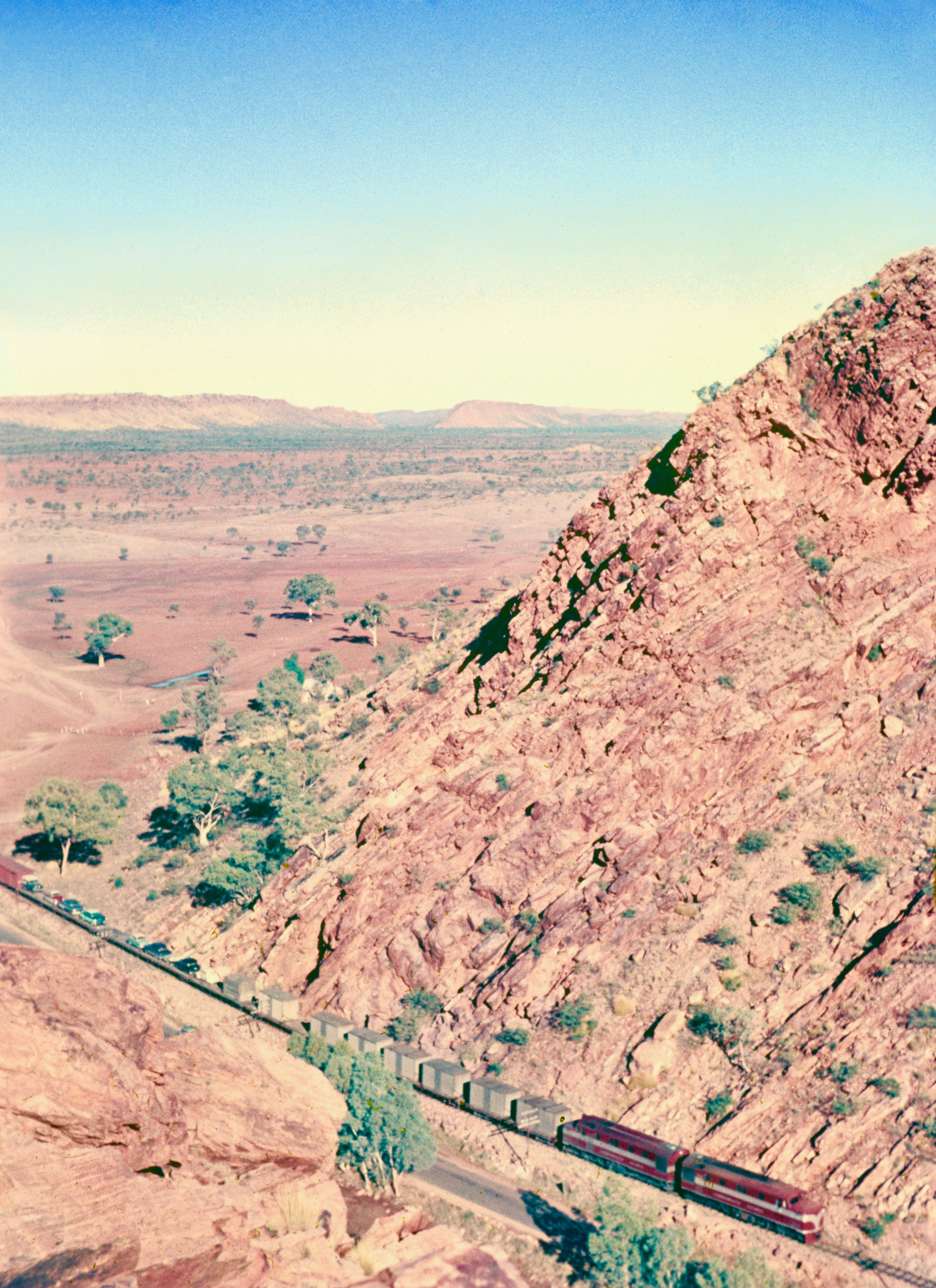
The Ghan passing through Heavitree Gap in Alice Springs in 1957 or 1958

During World War II, the service had to be greatly expanded, putting great pressure on the limited water supplies. As a result, de-mineralisation towers, some of which survive to this day, were built along the track so that bore water could be used. When a new line to Alice Springs was built in the 1970s, the use of diesel locomotives meant that there was far less need for water, allowing the line to take the much drier route from Tarcoola to Alice Springs.

The last narrow gauge service departed Alice Springs on 26 November 1980.

=== New line ===
In October 1980, a new standard gauge line from Tarcoola on the Trans-Australian Railway to Alice Springs opened, and the train took the form it has today. The new line is approximately 160 kilometres (99 mi) west of the former line, to avoid floodplains where the original line was often washed away during heavy rain. It was also hoped that the construction of the new line would improve the train's timekeeping.

The first Ghan on the new line departed Adelaide on 11 December 1980. It initially operated as a broad gauge service to Port Pirie. Following the conversion of the Adelaide to Crystal Brook to standard gauge in 1982, it operated as a standard gauge train throughout. Operating weekly, a second service was operated between May and October.

In November 1998, one service per week was extended from Adelaide to Melbourne. From April 1999, the other was diverted to operate to Sydney via Broken Hill. The extensions were withdrawn in November 2002 and March 2003 respectively.

=== Connection to Darwin ===
Construction of Alice Springs–Darwin line was believed to be the second-largest civil engineering project in Australia, and the largest since the creation of the Snowy Mountains Scheme. Line construction began in July 2001, with the first passenger train reaching Darwin on 3 February 2004, after 126 years of planning and waiting and at a cost of $1.3 billion.

The Ghan's arrival in Darwin signified a new era of tourism in the Northern Territory, making travel to the region easier and more convenient. The rail link allows more freight to travel north, leading to a hope that Darwin will serve as another trade link with Asia.

In preparation for the connection to Darwin, one of the locomotives was named after wildlife expert Steve Irwin, an international symbol of outback Australia, to promote the new service and tourism to the region.

In August 2015, due to the Abbott Government's decision to end federal government funding of the service, Great Southern Rail announced the frequency of The Ghan trains would be reduced from twice weekly to once weekly. In July 2016, all economy class seats were removed. This significantly increased the lowest price of a ticket, and led the service to be classified as an exclusively luxury train rather than a financially viable option for intercity commuters.

=== Suspension during pandemic ===
The Ghan was suspended for five months from March to August 2020 due to COVID-19 restrictions and border closures – the longest suspension in the train's existence. The train was suspended again on its final run of the 2020 season due to a lockdown in South Australia.

== Media depictions ==
The original Ghan was featured in an episode of BBC Television's series Great Railway Journeys of the World in 1980, presented by Michael Frayn.

The modern Ghan featured in an episode of Channel 5 series Chris Tarrant: Extreme Railways, and the Mighty Trains series.

In 2018, it was the subject of SBS slow television documentary The Ghan: Australia's Greatest Train Journey. The entire journey from Adelaide to Darwin which was filmed in 2017, was condensed into a three-hour highlights show with no voiceover or narration, much of it featuring footage directly from the front of the locomotive and various helicopter views. An extended 17-hour version of the show aired on SBS's secondary channel, SBS Viceland.

In October 2019, the train featured in BBC Two's episode one of Michael Portillo's Great Australian Railway Journeys.

The Ghan is the setting of Benjamin Stevenson's 2023 novel, Everyone on This Train Is a Suspect, in which a group of crime writers attempt to solve a murder on board the train.

== Noteworthy incidents ==
- On 24 October 2002, The Ghan collided with a school bus in Salisbury, South Australia. Four people on the bus were killed, with no significant injuries to Ghan passengers.
- On 12 December 2006, The Ghan collided with a truck at a level crossing and derailed 35 kilometres (22 mi) south of Adelaide River in the Northern Territory. Seven of the eleven carriages came off the tracks. One woman was critically injured. Other passengers received minor injuries. The truck driver involved was arrested and found guilty of a number of charges related to the accident.
- On 4 March 2007, rain washed out a portion of the track between Darwin and Adelaide River. During repairs, trains terminated at Katherine.
- On 6 August 2007, The Ghan collided with a sewage truck at a level crossing 50 km (31 mi) north of Adelaide in South Australia. Three passengers suffered from shock and minor injuries. The truck driver was temporarily trapped in his vehicle.
- On 6 June 2009, a nineteen-year-old American tourist clung to the outside of The Ghan for two hours and 200 kilometres (120 mi) when he was locked out of the train following a stop in Port Augusta. A technician heard his screams and stopped the train.

== Gallery ==
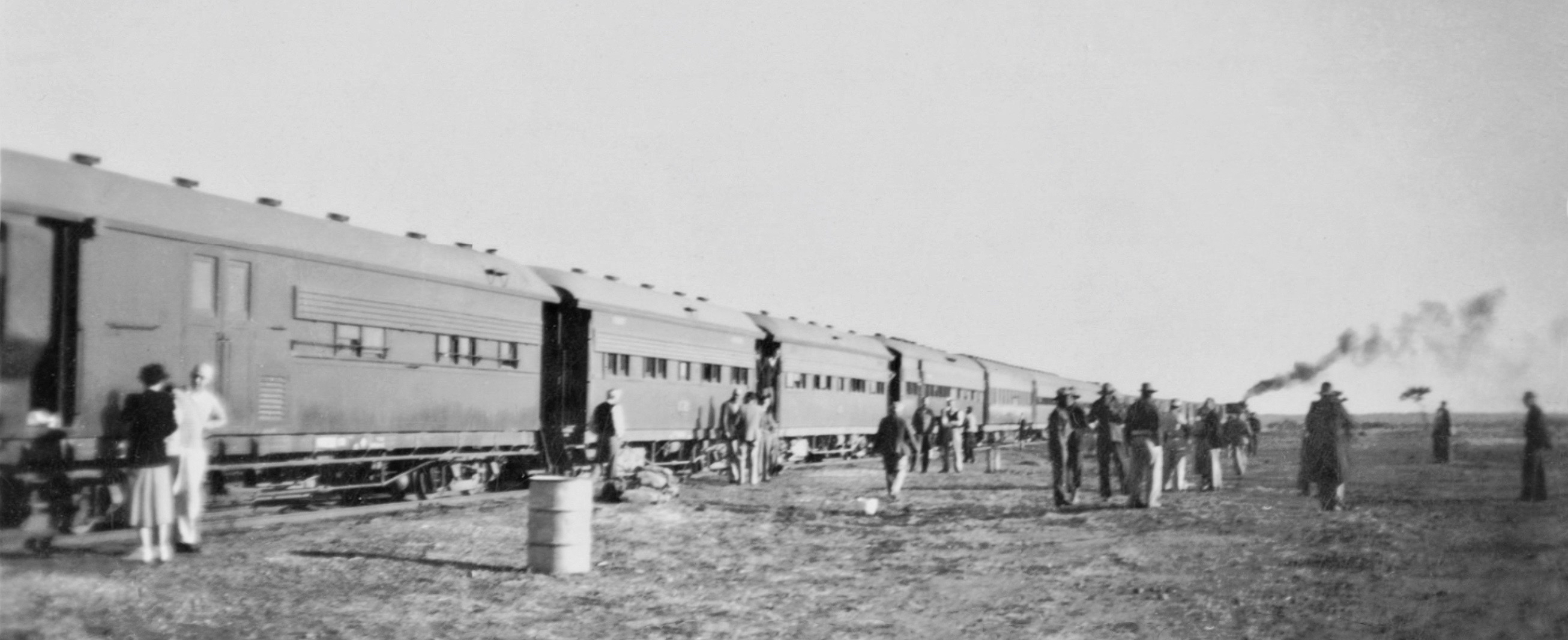
Ghan passengers stretch their legs at one of the many stops to take on water – Finke, north of the South Australia / Northern Territory border, winter ca 1948

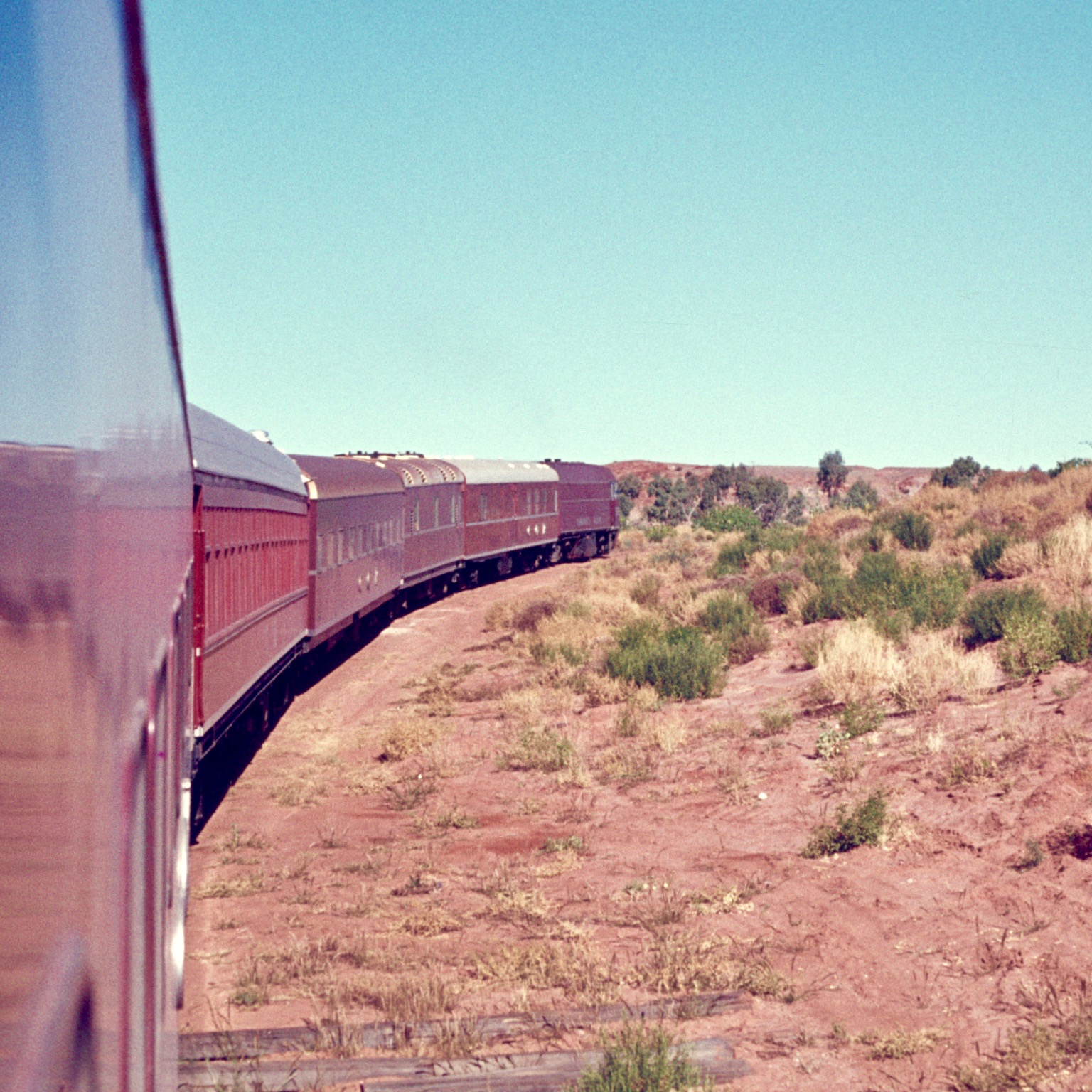
Flash floods regularly washed away bridges and track on the narrow-gauge railway. The Ghan is climbing out of the Finke River depression after track was laid on the river bed as a cheap solution.

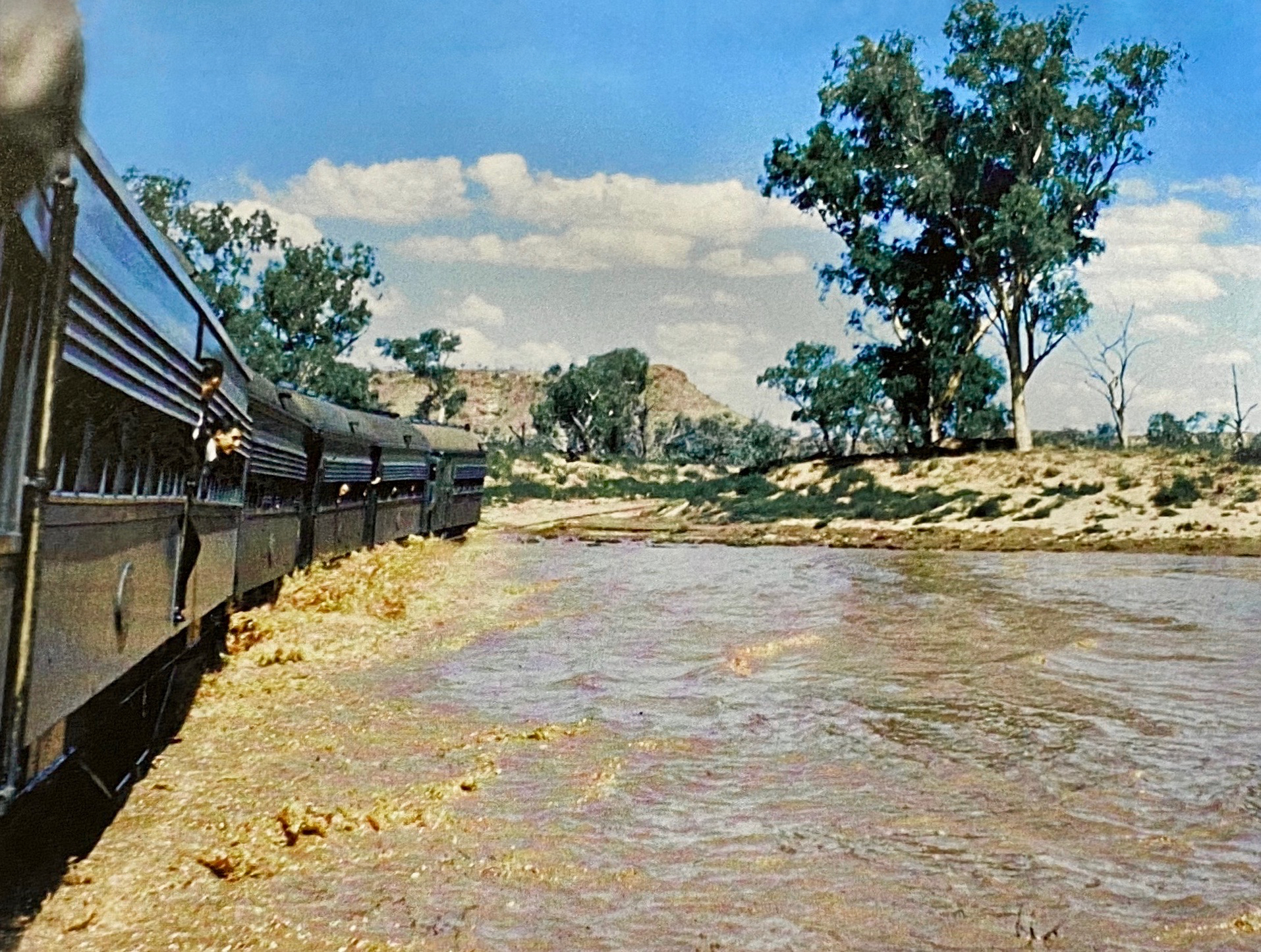
Proceeding through the Finke River was possible with trains hauled by steam locomotives but not with diesel-electrics because of their low-slung traction motors

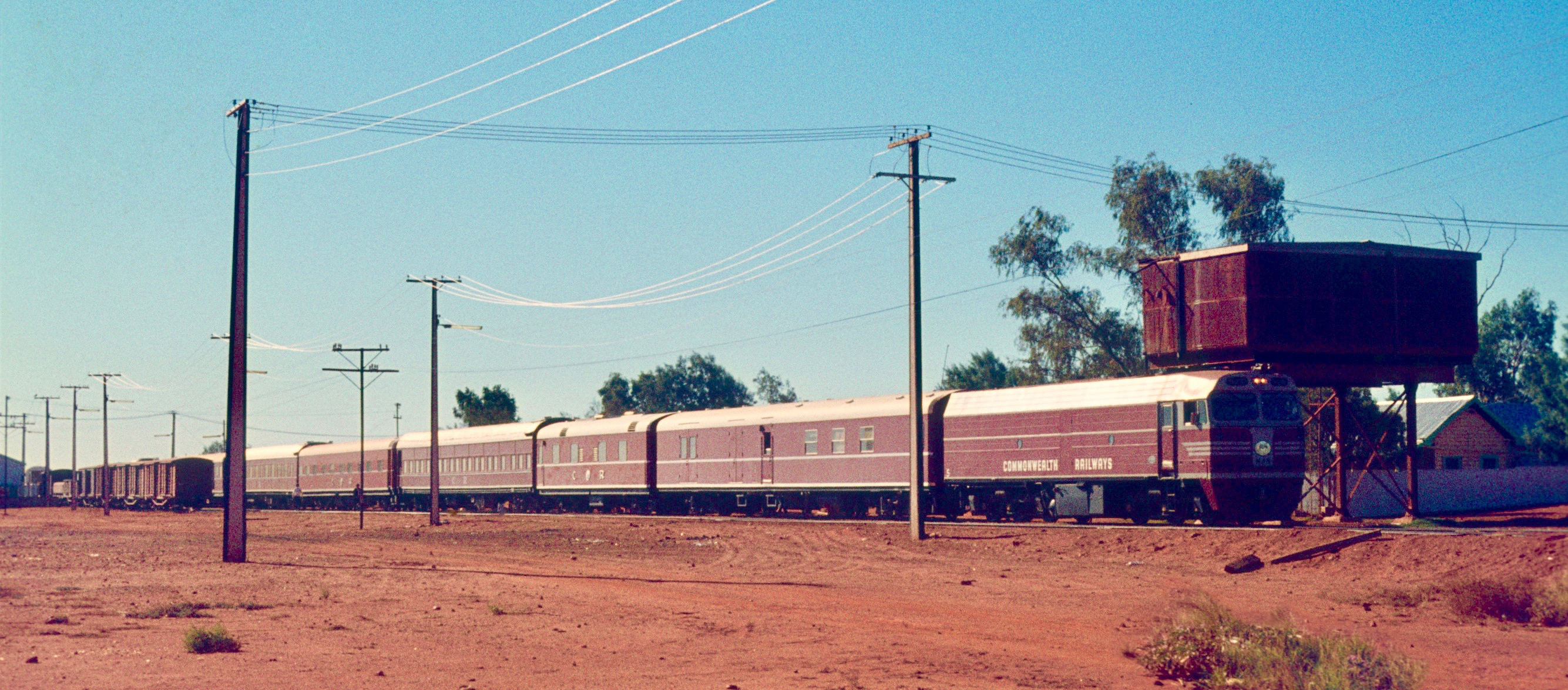
The Ghan in the narrow-gauge diesel-hauled era (pre-1980): the train, headed by an NJ class locomotive, is ready to depart Alice Springs, about 1973

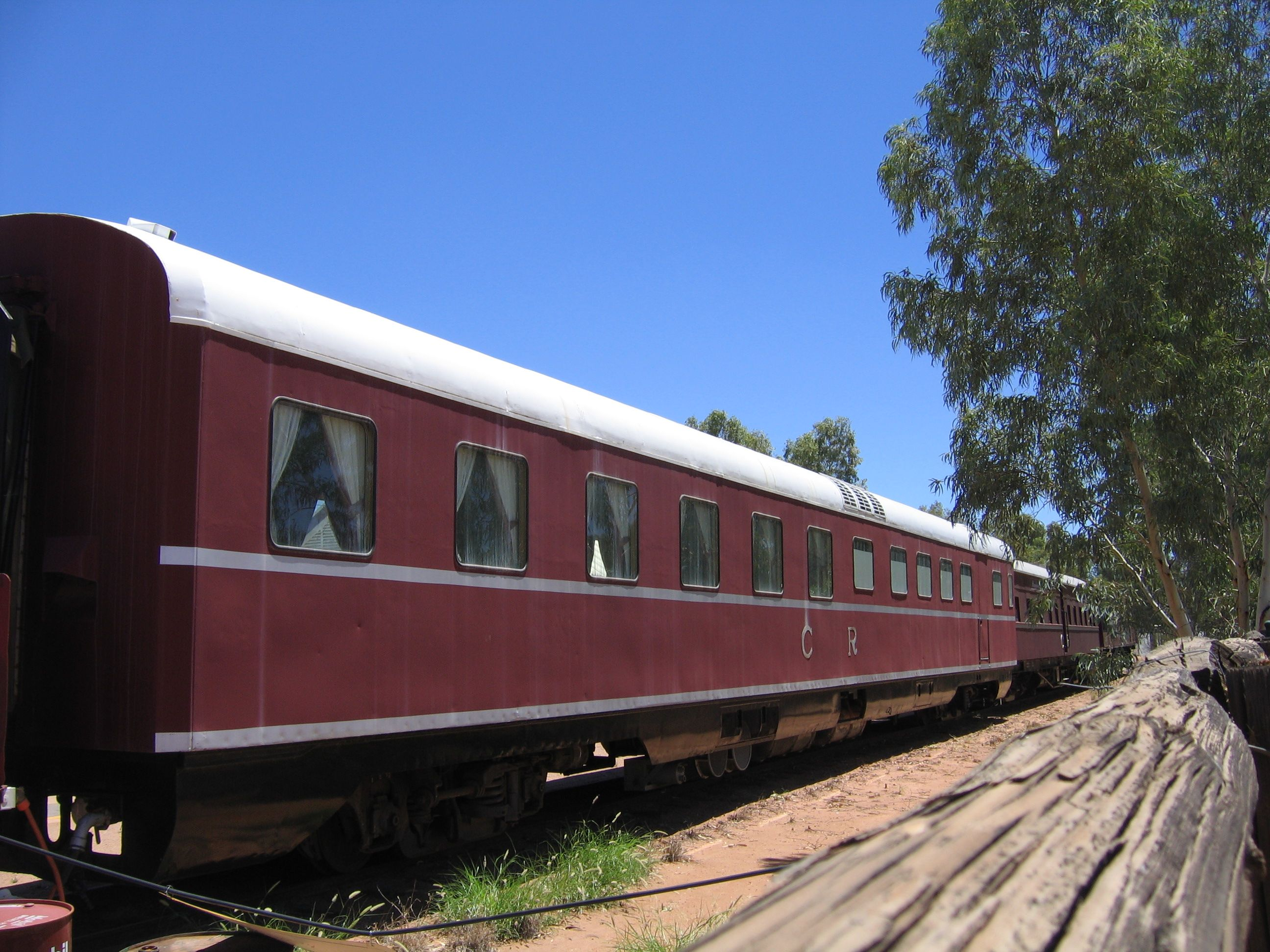
A latter-day narrow-gauge Ghan restaurant car retained at the Old Ghan Heritage Railway and Museum, Alice Springs, in 2009

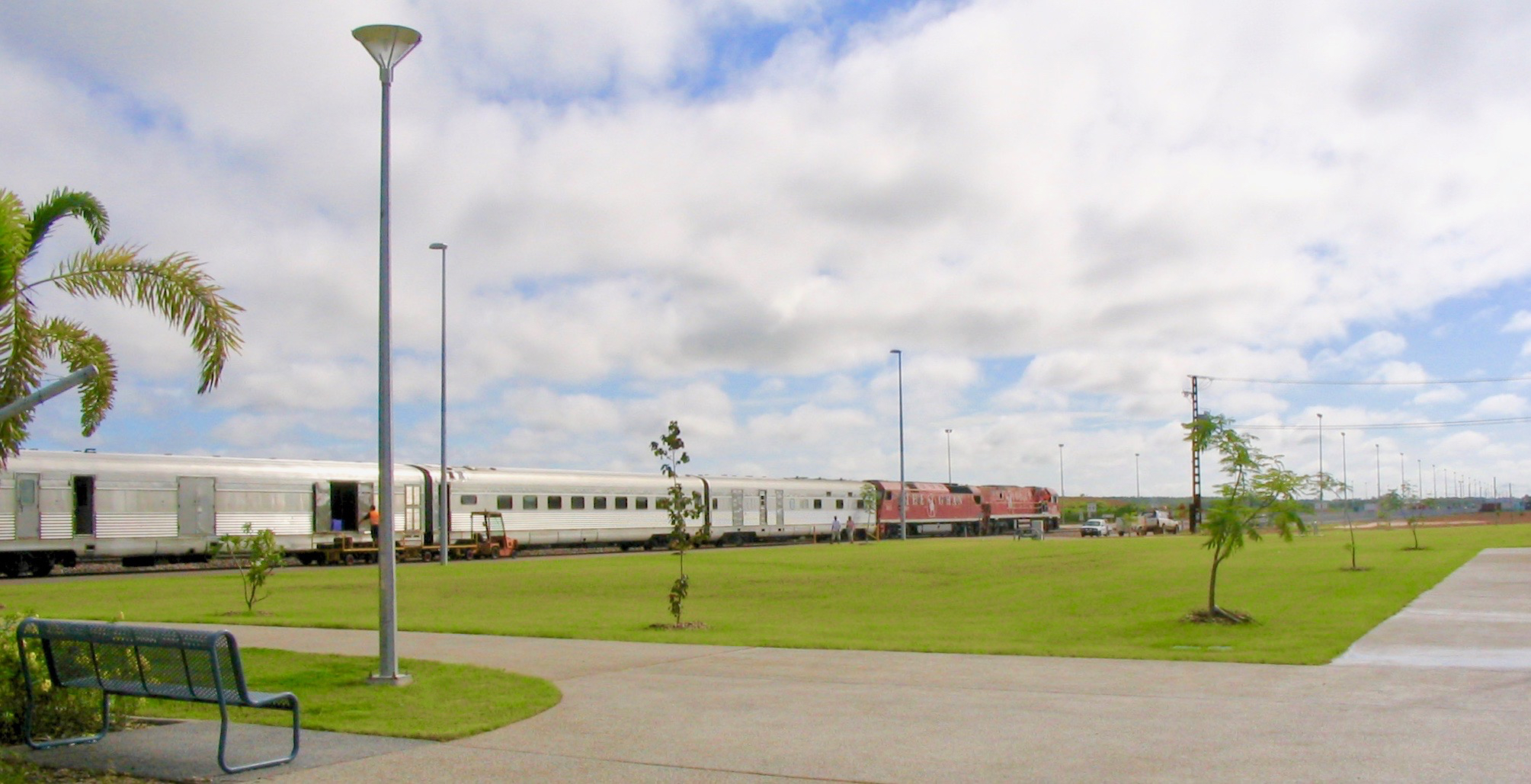
The Ghan at Darwin railway station, East Arm, in 2005

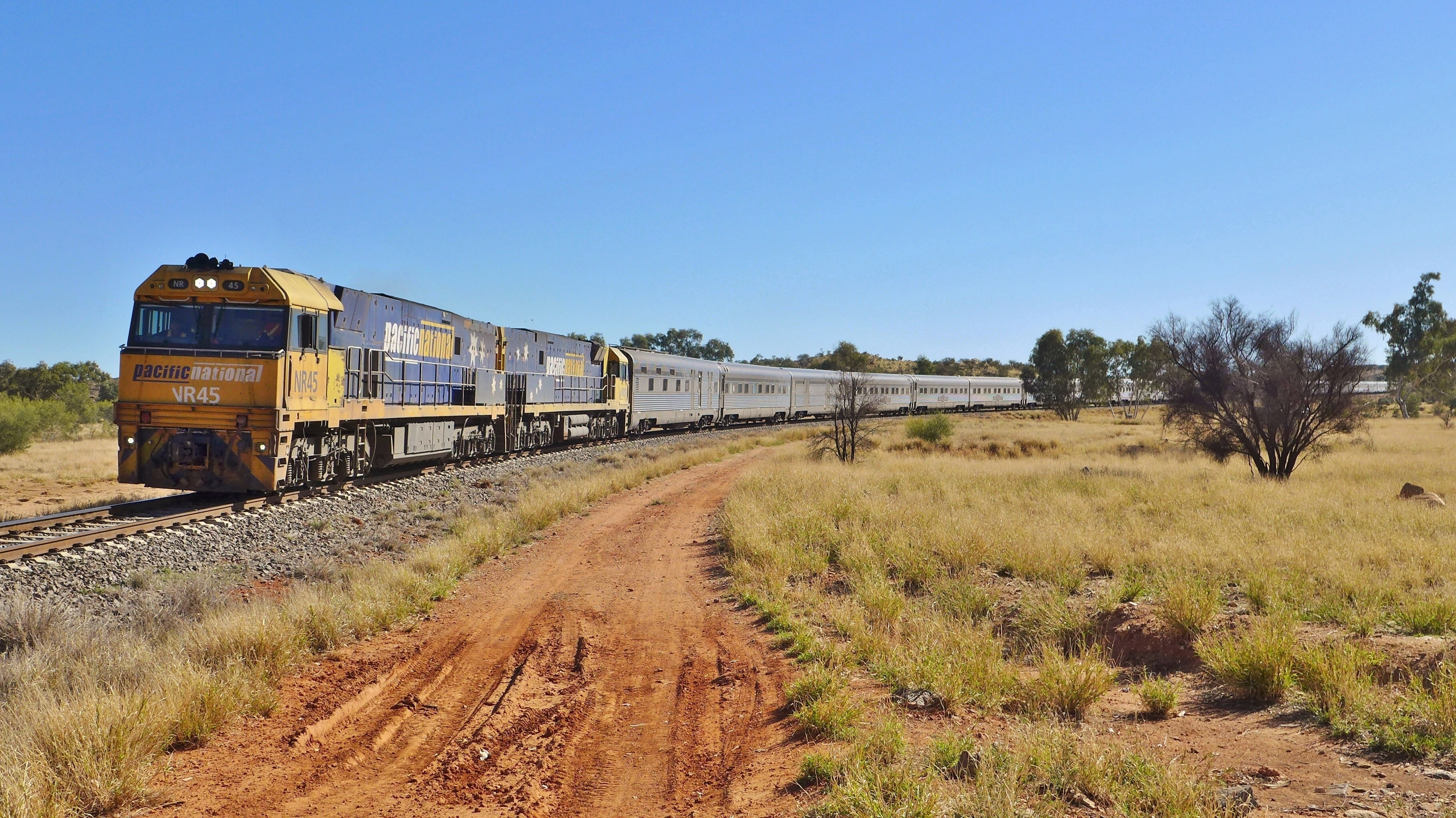
The Ghan, southbound, on the curve into Alice Springs, 2015

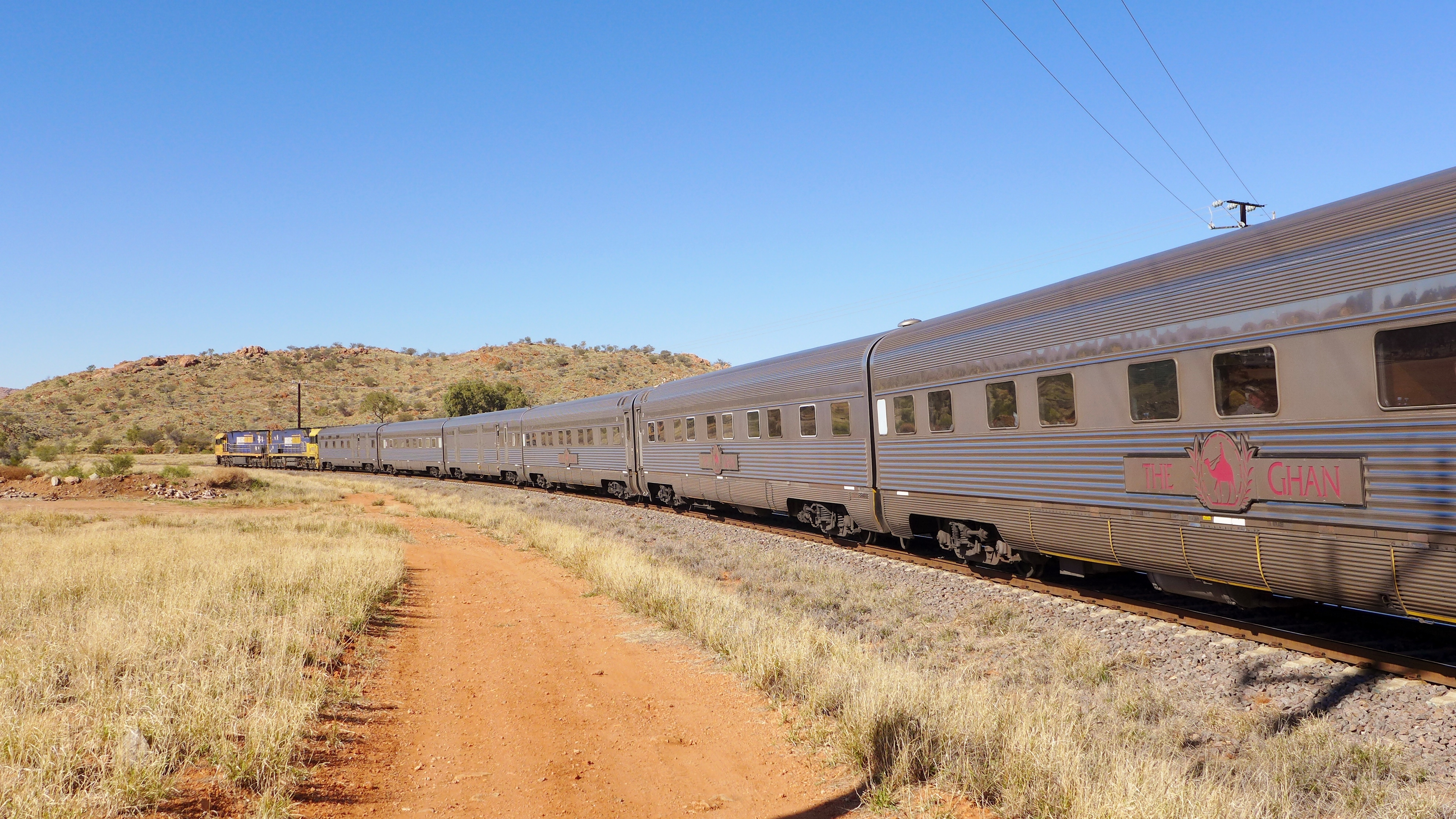
The train, further back, looking towards Alice Springs

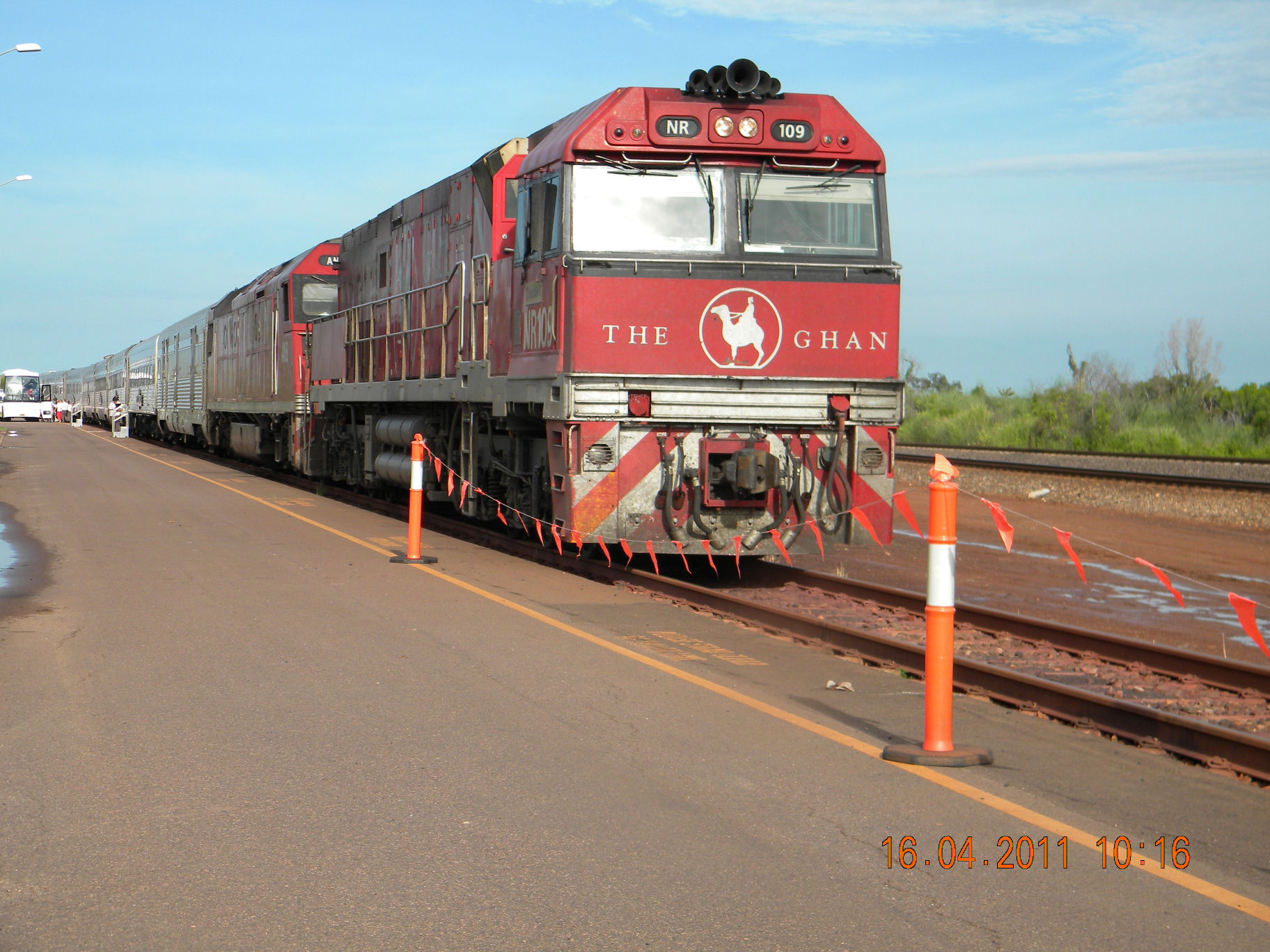
The Ghan at Darwin station in 2011; the locomotive was one of several bearing the train's logo and red livery

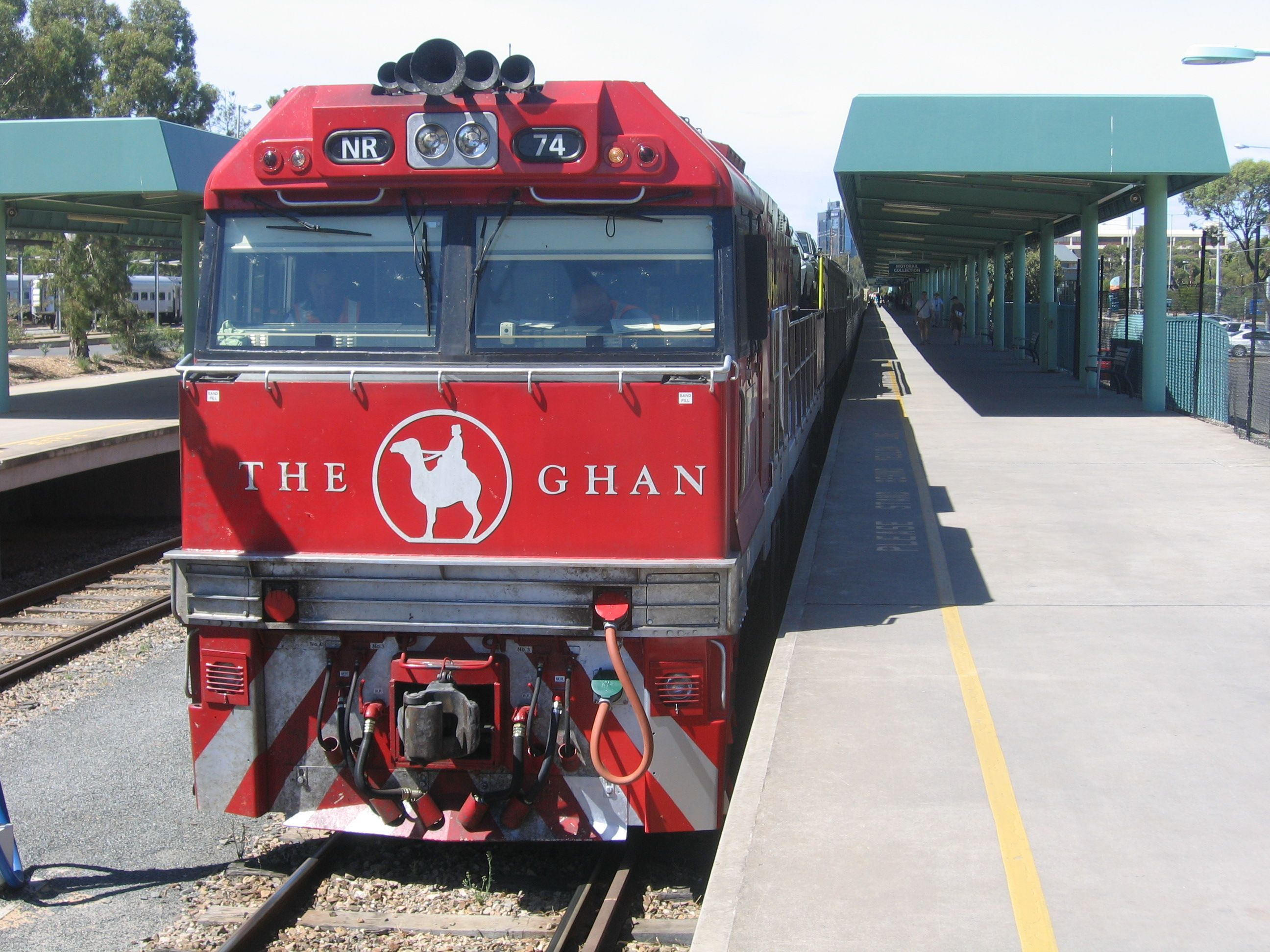
The Ghan at its southern departure point, the Adelaide Parklands Terminal

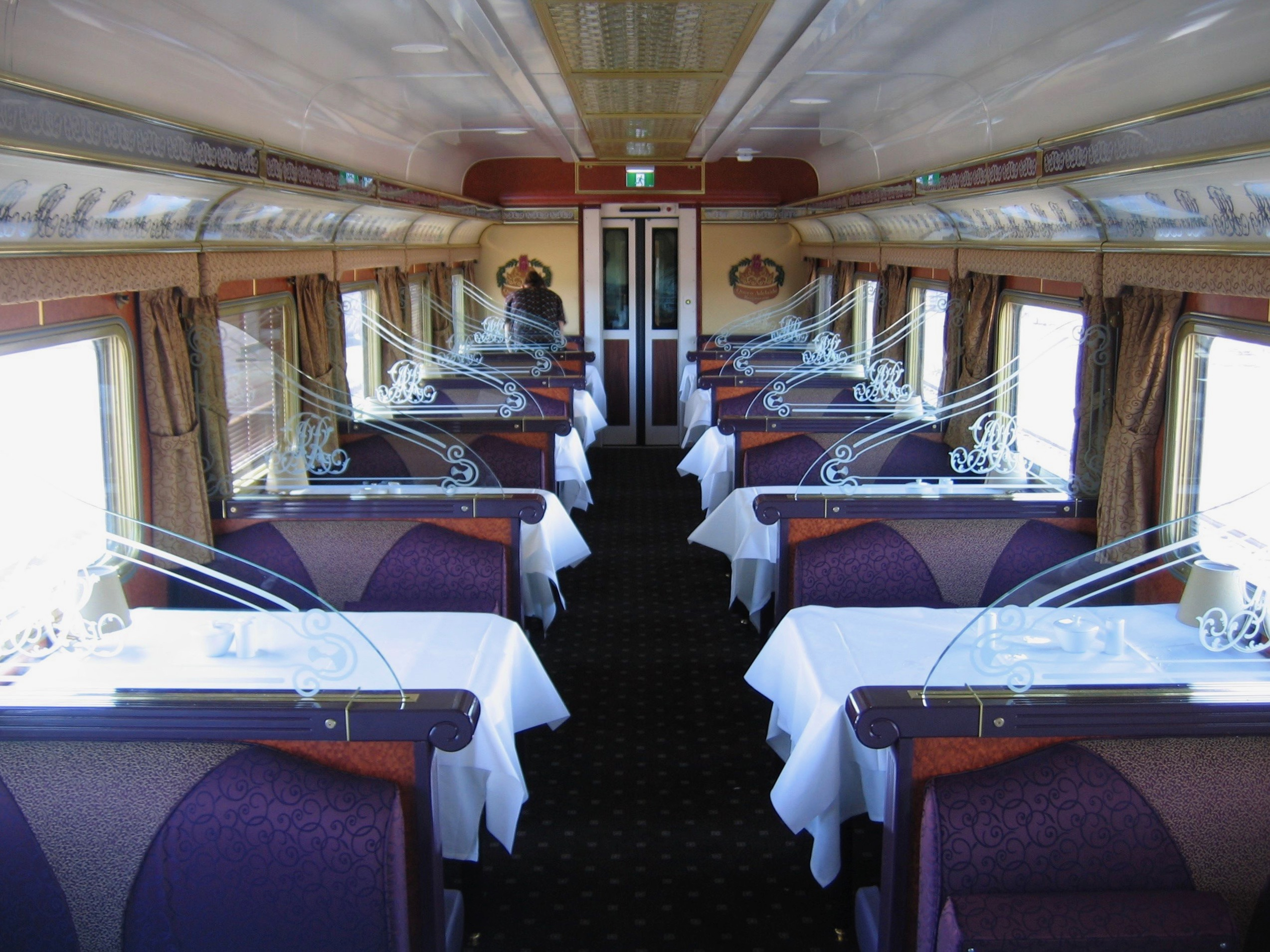
The first-class restaurant car on The Ghan (standard gauge), 2009

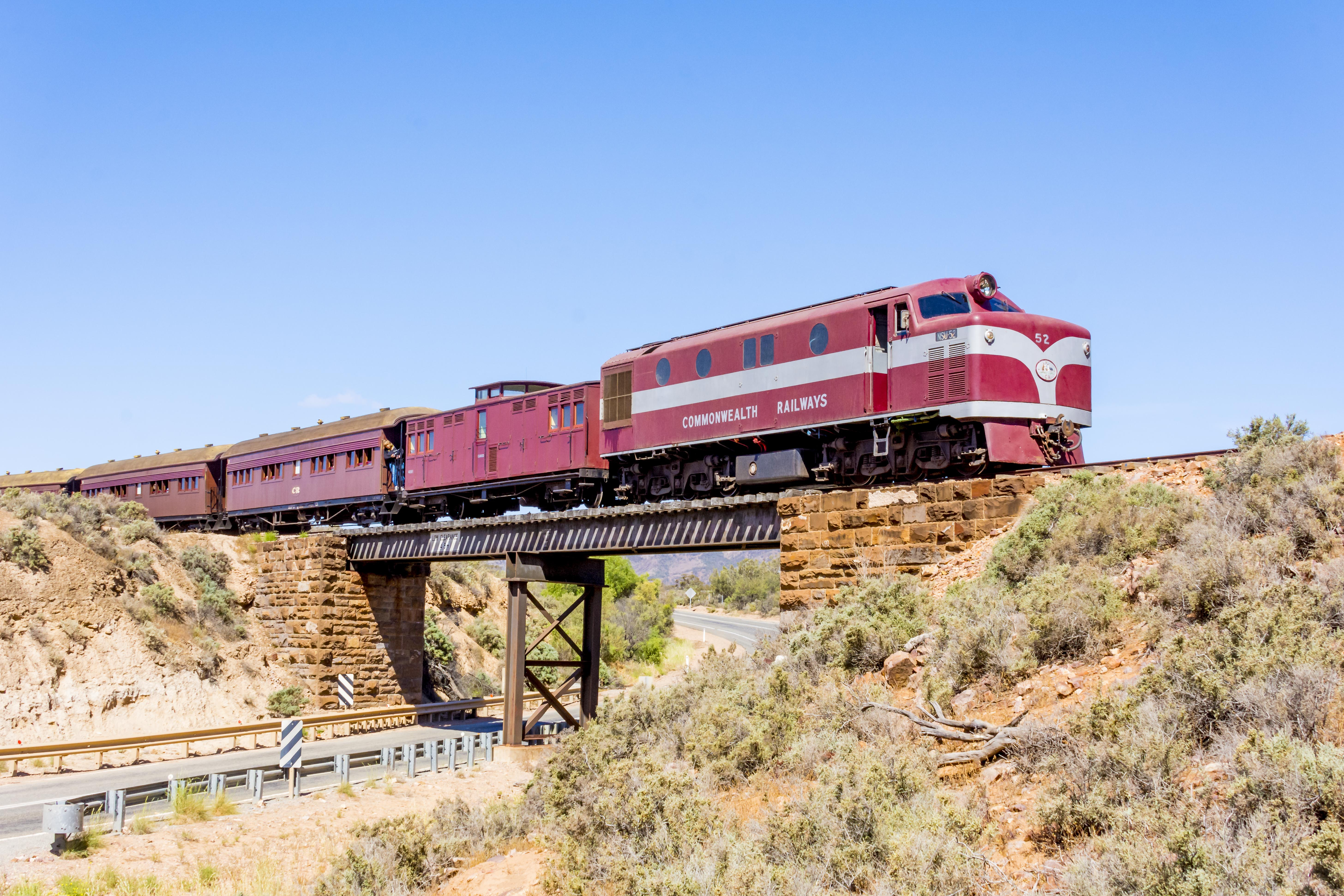
An NSU class diesel locomotive that hauled The Ghan in the narrow-gauge era, now operating at the Pichi Richi Railway
