= Mount Willoughby, South Australia =

Mount Willoughby South Australia
- Coordinates: 28°25′25″S 134°10′06″E
- Population: 24 (shared with other localities) (2016 census) (Note: For the 2016 census, the ‘State Suburb of Mount Willoughby’ consisted of the localities of Arckaringa, Evelyn Downs, Mount Barry, Nilpinna Station and Mount Willoughby, and part of Allandale Station.)
- Established: 26 April 2013
- Postcode(s): 5723
- Time zone: ACST (UTC+9:30)
  - Summer (DST): ACST (UTC+10:30)
- Location: 837 km (520 mi) north-west of Adelaide; 84 km (52 mi) north-west of Coober Pedy
- LGA(s): Pastoral Unincorporated Area
- Region: Far North
- County: 'out of counties'
- State electorate(s): Giles
- Federal division(s): Grey
Mean max temp	Mean min temp	Annual rainfall
27.8 °C; 82 °F	13.7 °C; 57 °F	156.1 mm 6.1 in
Suburbs around Mount Willoughby:
Wintanna	Wintanna; Evelyn Downs	Evelyn Downs
Maralinga Tjarutja	Mount Willoughby	Evelyn Downs; Mount Barry
Maralinga Tjarutja	Mabel Creek; Mount Clarence Station; Coober Pedy	Coober Pedy
- Footnotes: Location; Adjoining localities

Mount Willoughby is a locality in the Australian state of South Australia located about 837 kilometres (520 miles) north-west of the capital city of Adelaide and about 84 kilometres (52 miles) north-west of the town of Coober Pedy.

The locality was established on 26 April 2013 in respect to "the long established local name" which is derived from the pastoral lease.

Mount Willoughby is located on land on the boundary between the Stony Plains and the Great Victoria Desert bioregions which "supports a remarkable collection of habitats, ranging from swamps and grassland to cracking clay pans, spectacular breakaway ranges and vivid red dune country". The Adelaide-Darwin railway and the Stuart Highway both pass through the locality from south to north while the Woomera Prohibited Area occupies part of the locality's south-west corner.

The principal land uses within the locality are primary production and conservation with the former being associated with the grazing of cattle in the northern end of the locality and the latter being associated with the Mount Willoughby Indigenous Protected Area in the remainder of the locality.

Mount Willoughby is located within the federal Division of Grey, the state electoral district of Giles, the Pastoral Unincorporated Area of South Australia and the state's Far North region.
