= Mount Willoughby Indigenous Protected Area =

Indigenous protected area in South Australia

- IUCN category VI (protected area with sustainable use of natural resources)
- Location within South Australia
- Location: South Australia
- Nearest city: Coober Pedy
- Coordinates: 28°28′43″S 134°09′58″E
- Area: 4,206.72 km^{2} (1,624.22 sq mi)
- Established: 22 August 2002
- Governing body: Tjirilya Aboriginal Corporation

Mount Willoughby Indigenous Protected Area is an Indigenous Protected Area (IPA) in the Australian state of South Australia located in the gazetted localities of Mount Willoughby and Evelyn Downs about 150 kilometres (93 miles) north-west of the town of Coober Pedy.

The IPA was declared on 22 August 2002 at the meeting of the Tjirilya Aboriginal Corporation after a period of “two years of consultation and planning” with the declaration being "subsequently ratified by senior traditional owners". The lease for the land which was previously used for pastoral purposes including the grazing of cattle and sheep was purchased for the Tjirilya Aboriginal Corporation by the Indigenous Land Corporation in 1996 in “recognition of its cultural significance to the local Aboriginal community and the potential for small business operations such as ecotourism”.

The IPA occupies land within the southern parts of the localities of Mount Willoughby and Evelyn Downs and shares a boundary with the Tallaringa Conservation Park, a protected area managed by the Government of South Australia, to the west. Land within the IPA is located on the boundary between two bioregions - the Great Victoria Desert and the Stony Plains.

In 2003, a survey was carried out within the IPA by the state government on behalf of the Tjirilya Aboriginal Corporation and under the auspices of the Biological Survey of South Australia. This survey recorded “75 bird species, 14 native mammals, 47 reptiles and one frog species” as well as the rare desert flower, the daisy Erigeron sessilifolius.

As of 2004, the IPA was proposed to be managed as two zones with one being a “Resource Protected Area” and the other being a “conservation, tourism and recreation area”. Management works were reported as including “monitoring of erosion, protection of fragile areas and management of feral animals and stock, monitoring of sensitive vegetation communities, weed eradication and recording of sites of cultural significance”. A small business operation was proposed to be established in order to “provide funds for environmental management and community employment”.

The IPA is classified as an IUCN Category VI protected area.
