= Adelaide–Darwin railway line =

Railway lines across Australia

Adelaide–Darwin rail corridor
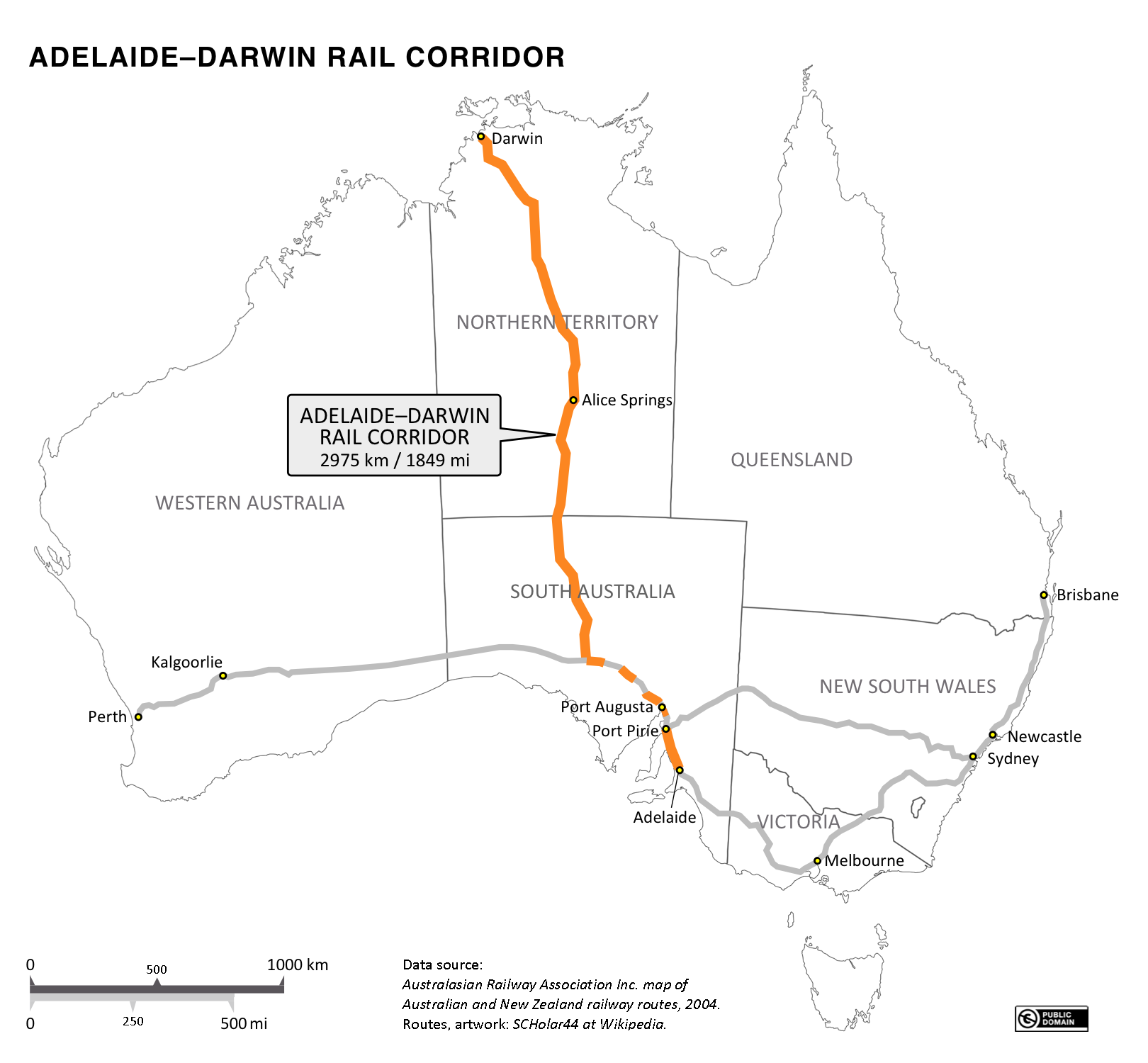

Technical
- Line length: 2975-kilometre (1849-mile)
- Track gauge: 1,435 mm (4 ft 8 1/2 in)
- Signalling: TOW from Darwin to Northgate Block Point

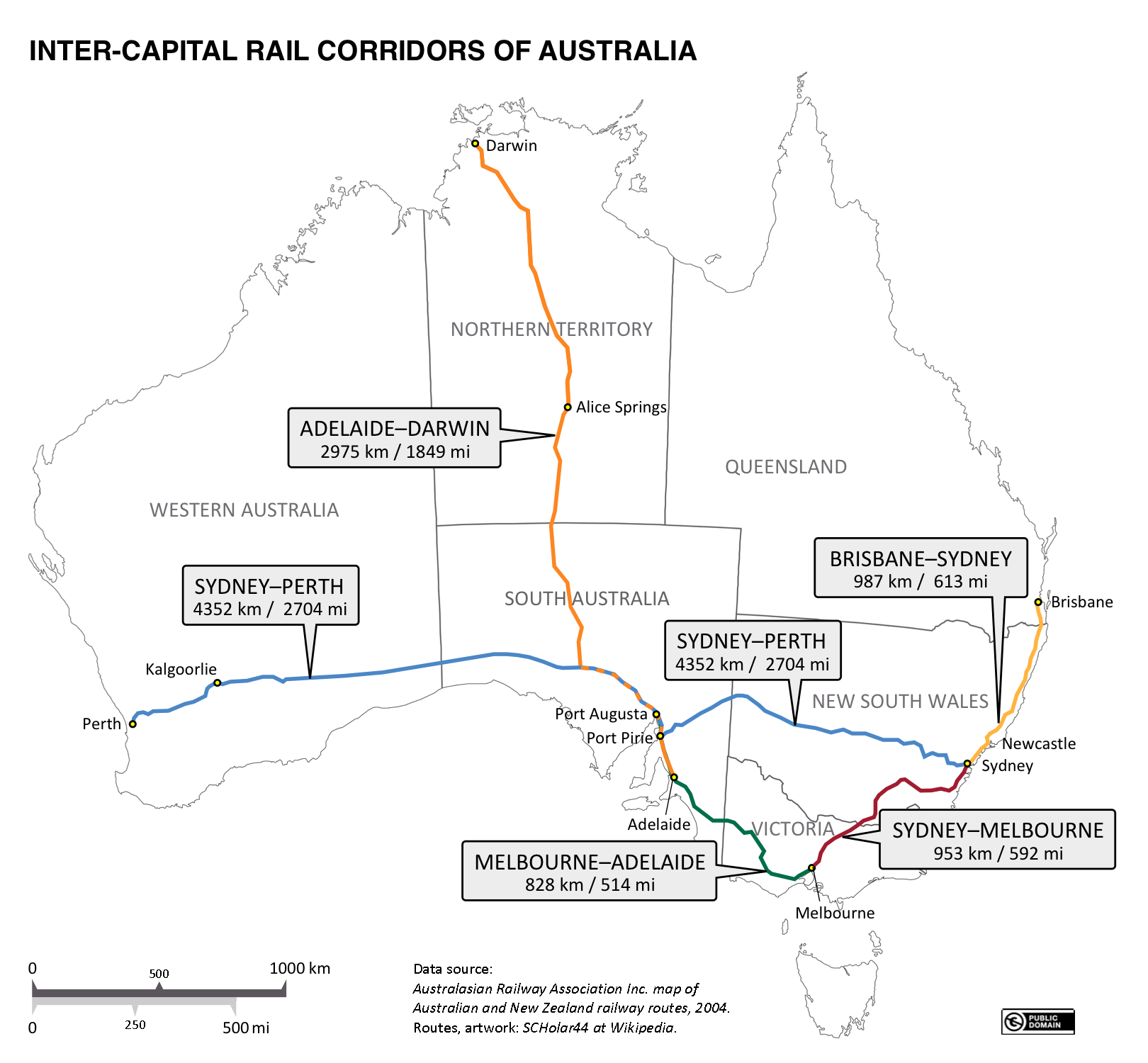
Australia's inter-capital rail corridors

The Adelaide–Darwin rail corridor consists of the 2975-kilometre (1849-mile) long 1435 mm (4 ft 8 1/2 in) standard-gauge main line between the South Australian capital city of Adelaide and the Northern Territory capital of Darwin, and the lines immediately connected to it. Preceded by a number of other shorter railways, a transcontinental line through to Darwin was completed in 2004, when the final link from Alice Springs was opened. The line is used by interstate freight trains operated by Aurizon and by The Ghan passenger train operated by Journey Beyond.

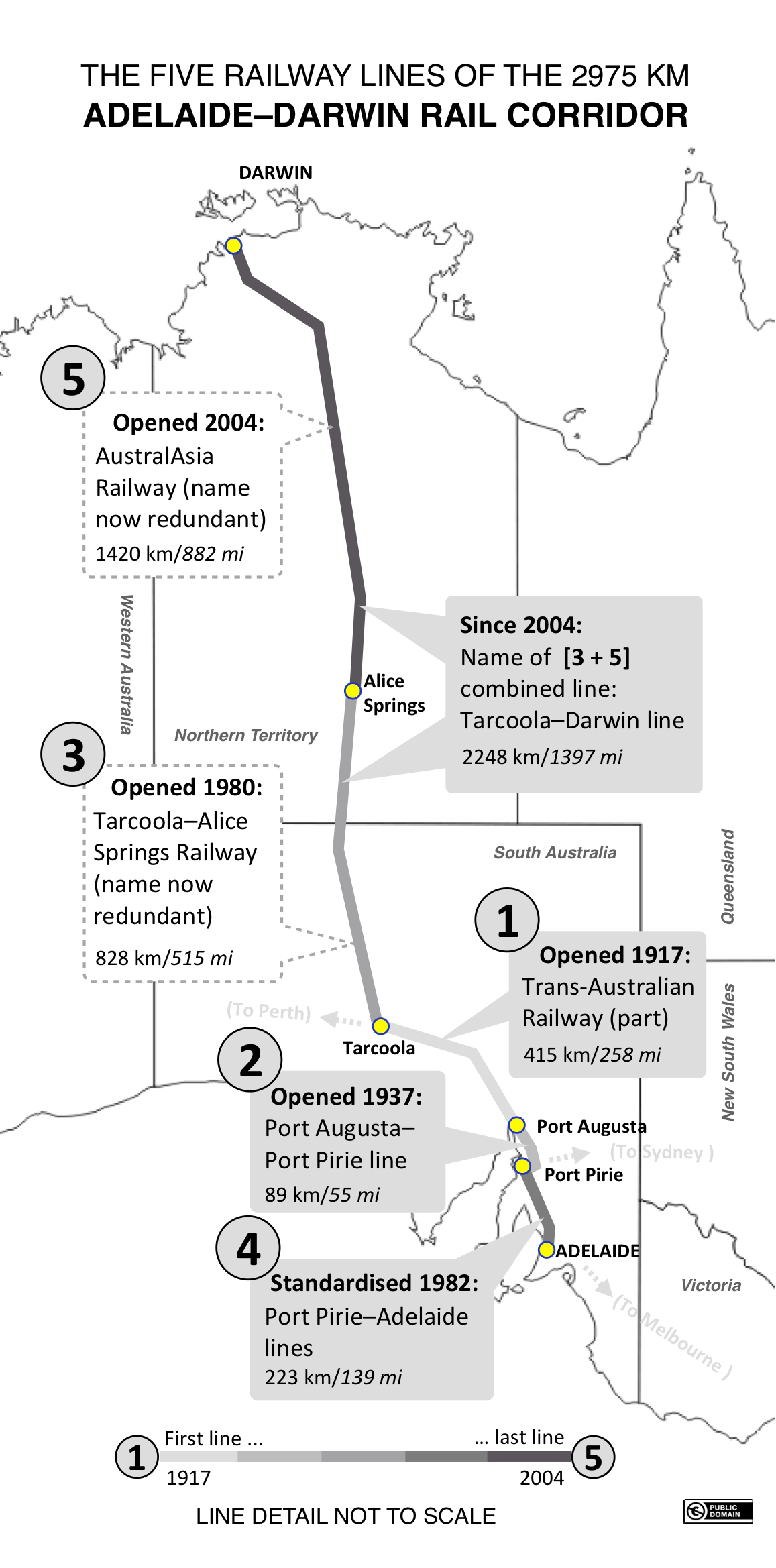
The Adelaide–Darwin rail corridor, completed in 2004. Construction of the first of its five constituent lines started 87 years earlier – and its predecessor 39 years before that.

== First steps toward a transcontinental railway ==
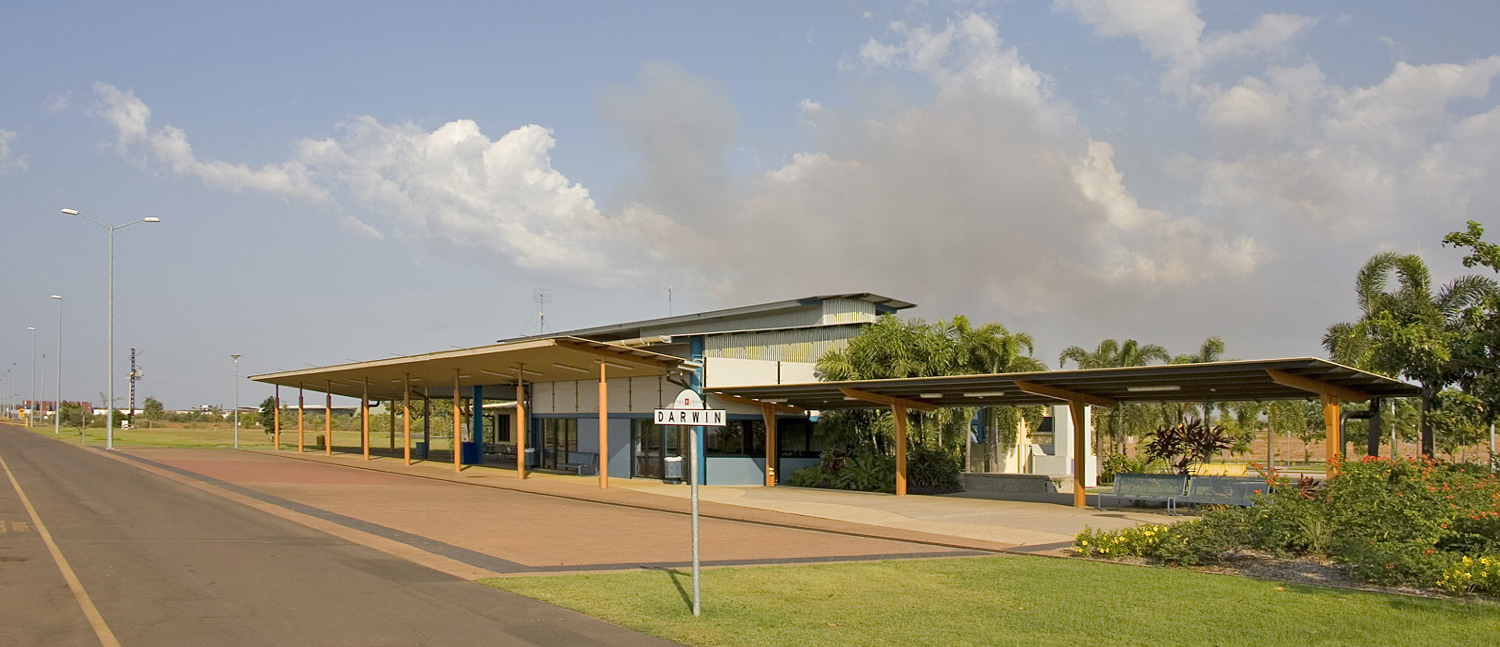
Darwin's railway station, known as the Berrimah passenger terminal

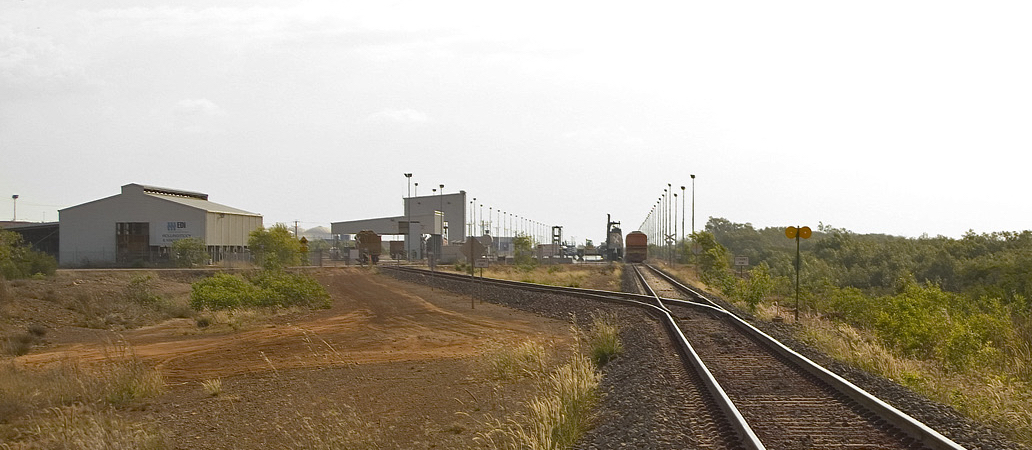
The Berrimah rail maintenance depot and freight terminal, at East Arm, are 1 kilometre (0.6 mile) before the Berrimah passenger terminal and 5 kilometres (3 miles) before the extreme end of the line at East Arm wharfs

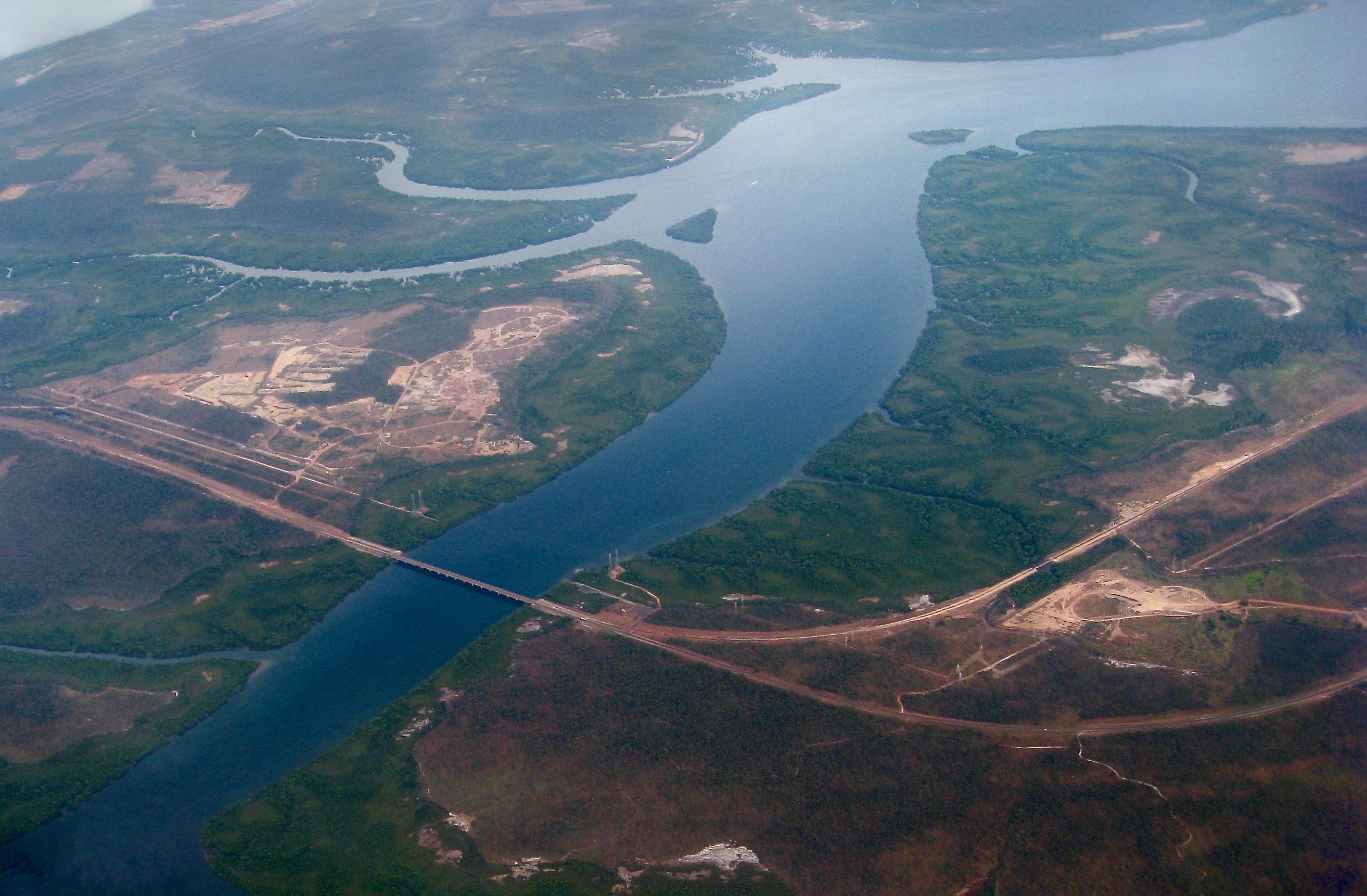
Elizabeth River Bridge, 17 km (11 mi) south of Darwin, built for rail and road traffic by the Alice Springs–Darwin railway project in 2003

Under the provisions of the Northern Territory Acceptance Act 1910, the Commonwealth Railways assumed responsibility for the South Australian Railways' narrow gauge lines in the far north of South Australia and the Northern Territory. The Act mandated the building of a south–north railway although, crucially, no date was specified.

Two routes were considered: a standard gauge line branching off the Trans-Australian Railway at Tarcoola or a cheaper extension, from Oodnadatta, of the narrow gauge Central Australia Railway (CAR) line that had opened in 1891. Eventually the Oodnadatta route was chosen, and the extension to Alice Springs was opened in 1929. Meanwhile, the North Australia Railway (NAR) opened in stages south from Darwin to Birdum, with Birdum reached in 1929.

In the late 1940s, the South Australian Government developed the Leigh Creek coalfields, 271 km (168 mi) north of Port Augusta to provide coal for a power station in Adelaide and, later, for a new power station built at the port. The infrastructure of the CAR was inadequate for the increased tonnages to be carried, so the federal government funded a new standard gauge line from Stirling North to the coalfields, and on to Marree to provide cattle transport.

The northernmost two-thirds followed an alignment generally within 8 kilometres (5 miles) of the narrow-gauge line. The southern third avoided the impediments of the mountainous section near Quorn and Hawker. The new standard-gauge line covered one-third of the distance to Alice Springs. A Commonwealth Railways booklet mentioned its "special importance to the Northern Territory as it is the first stage in the ultimate conversion of the narrow-gauge railway to Alice Springs to standard 4 ft 8 1/2 in gauge".

== Tarcoola to Alice Springs ==
By 1967, interest in a transcontinental route had revived again. Extension of the route then in existence was one of three options considered, but a route far to the west, largely free of flood events, was chosen. In April 1975, construction of the current 828 km (515 mi) kilometre line from Tarcoola to Alice Springs began, opening in October 1980. The CAR closed shortly after. By then, the NAR had closed, in June 1976, following the closure of the iron ore mine at Frances Creek.

== Alice Springs to Darwin ==
In 1983, the federal government announced its intention to extend the standard gauge line from Alice Springs to Darwin to complete the Adelaide–Darwin rail corridor. It was planned to open in 1988, Australia's bicentenary year. After a change of federal government in March 1983, the new government cancelled the project, and the project languished for a further 16 years.

In June 1999, the AustralAsia Rail Corporation, a company owned by the Northern Territory and South Australian Governments, was awarded the contract to build and operate a 1420 km (880 mi) Alice Springs to Darwin line as a Build, Own, Operate and Transfer project to the Asia Pacific Transport Consortium (APTC). The APTC contracted FreightLink to implement the project and to operate the railway. It cost $1.2 billion to build.

The Federal Government contributed $165 million from the Centenary of Federation Fund, the Northern Territory Government contributed $165 million, and the South Australian Government contributed $150 million to the AustralAsia Rail Corporation for the construction of assets by the APTC and FreightLink, that were later leased for a peppercorn rent to FreightLink. In addition, the three governments contributed about $26 million each, a total of $79 million in further funding to support the APTC directly, by way of mezzanine debt financing (subordinated debt), equity, and contingent equity.

Construction began in July 2001. Completion occurred in September 2003. On 17 January 2004 the first freight train reached Darwin. On 4 February 2004 the first passenger train arrived in Darwin from Adelaide, travelling 2979 km (1851 mi) in 47 hours.

== In operation ==
FreightLink failed to make a profit in the first four years. In May 2008 the company announced that the board, shareholders and lenders had agreed to sell the company's ownership of the Alice Springs to Darwin line, citing its inheritance of a large amount of debt from the construction phase that it was unable to manage. In November 2008, FreightLink went into voluntary administration after failing to reach agreement with creditors on the terms of a sale of the business.

In June 2010, Genesee & Wyoming Australia purchased the assets of FreightLink for $334 million, including the 50-year lease on the Tarcoola–Darwin line. In 2020, Genesee & Wyoming Australia was renamed to One Rail Australia. In 2022, Aurizon acquired One Rail Australia, and thus ownership of the Tarcoola–Darwin railway.

As of 2024, the line from Tarcoola to Alice Springs is owned by the Australian Rail Track Corporation and leased until 2047 to Aurizon. The line from Alice Springs to Darwin is owned by Aurizon until 2054, when ownership will pass to the Australian Government and the build–own–operate–and–transfer agreement will end. Aurizon undertakes train control on the entire Tarcoola–Darwin line. (Note: Train control is from Northgate block point, 6 km (3.7 mi) from Tarcoola, where the line diverges from the Trans-Australian Railway. It ends at Berrimah passenger terminal at Darwin. Northgate block point is 731 km (454 mi) from the Adelaide datum at Adelaide Parklands Terminal, near the Adelaide suburb of Keswick. Berrimah passenger terminal is 2974 km (1848 mi) from the Adelaide datum.)

== Traffic ==
Two experiential tourism trains operate on the line. The Ghan service operated by Journey Beyond, traverses the whole line and through to Adelaide weekly in each direction, with a scheduled duration of 53 hours 15 minutes. The company's Indian Pacific is an east–west service that runs on the southernmost 727 km (452 mi), before heading west to Perth.

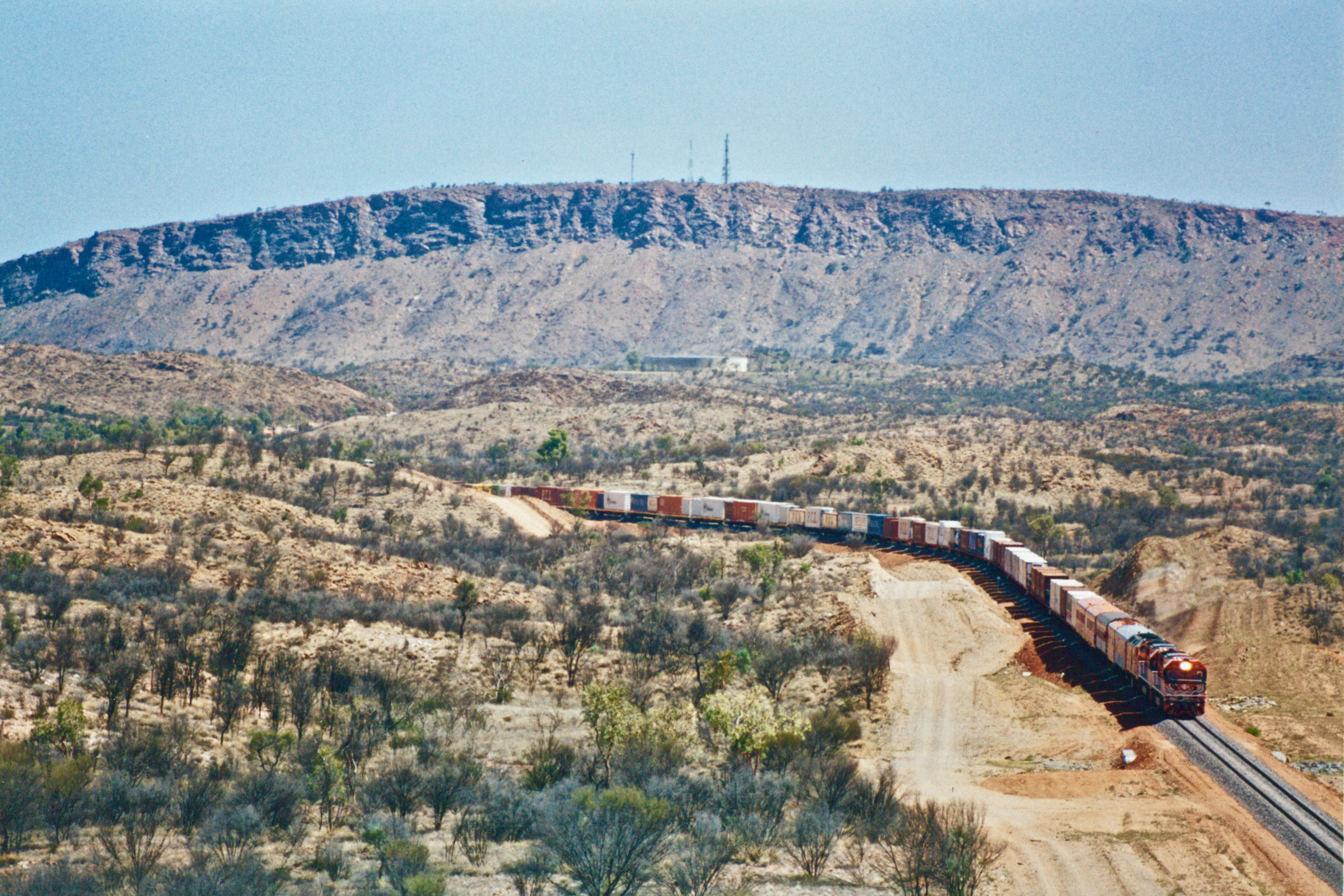
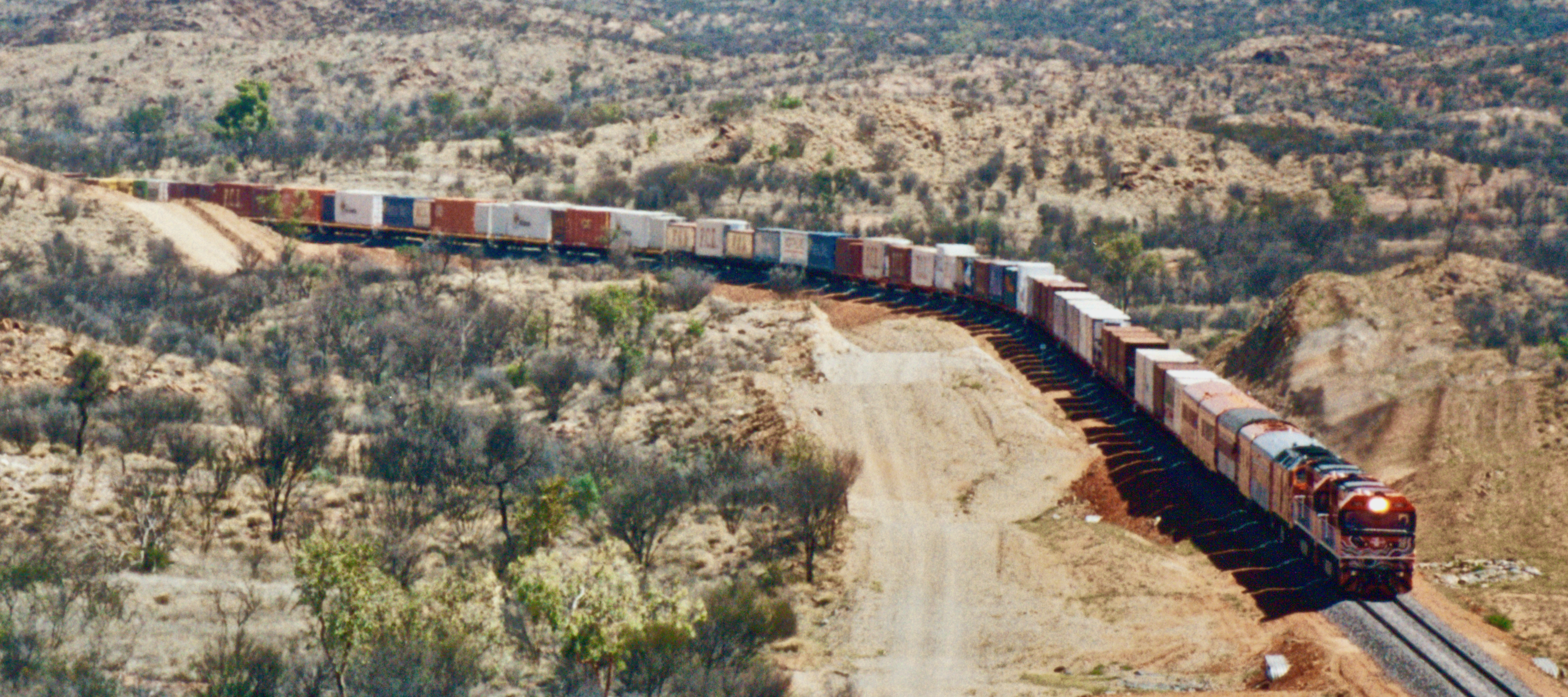

Aurizon is the only freight operator in the Tarcoola–Darwin section. Trains originate or terminate at intermodal terminals at Berrimah (Darwin) and Islington (Adelaide). They stop at intermodal points in Katherine, Tennant Creek and Alice Springs.

The line has facilitated bulk commodity exports from iron ore and copper mines in central Australia, including Oz Minerals' Prominent Hill copper mine. Following a derailment event in December 2011, Oz Minerals elected to use the line to export to the south via Port Adelaide.

Figures for Darwin's dry bulk exports illustrate the fickle nature of mining. In financial year 2010–11, export product delivered to Port Darwin by rail – comprising iron ore, manganese, and copper concentrate – exceeded 3 million tonnes for the first time. After copper traffic ceased, the figure in 2013–14 for iron and manganese was 2.7 million tonnes. After mining of iron ore ceased in 2015–16, only manganese remained. In 2018–19, manganese exports totalled 900,000 tonnes.

Since 2009 the company has hauled iron oxide / copper / gold ore mined at Prominent Hill (Note: 29.727286°S 135.567022°E.) from a 1.5 km (0.9 mi) siding at Wirrida, 95 km (60 mi) west of the mine and 129 km (80 mi) from Northgate. In 2012 a new iron ore mine was opened at Peculiar Knob, (Note: 29.586848°S 135.382827°E.) 22 km (14 mi) from Prominent Hill. Until production ceased in 2015, its product was loaded at Wirrida, at a balloon loop immediately north of the Prominent Hill loading site.

In 2019, the Australian Rail Track Corporation started a large-scale track upgrade program between Adelaide and Tarcoola to allow heavier freight trains to operate at higher speeds. Rails were placed during the year (Note: 70,000 tonnes of 60 kilograms per metre rails replaced 47 kg/m rail, increasing the axle load limit to 25 tonnes.) and finishing works such as replacing wooden sleepers with concrete ones were scheduled for 2020.

== Stations ==
The original CAR and NAR narrow-gauge lines had many small stations, sidings and halts along their routes for pick-up and set-down of wagons and less-than-car loads, and passengers. Other than fuel trains to Alice Springs and mineral unit trains, freight traffic has been all-through on the post-2004 standard-gauge route. Stations exist at Alice Springs, Tennant Creek, Katherine and Darwin. There are crossing loops, most of them 1860 metres (2030 yards) long: 12 south of Alice Springs and 3 to the north.

== See also ==
- Map of the evolution of the Adelaide–Darwin rail corridor
- Central Australia Railway
- North Australia Railway
