= Experiential travel =

Tourism focused on cultural activities

Experiential travel, also known as immersion travel, is a form of tourism in which people focus on experiencing a country, city or particular place by actively and meaningfully engaging with its history, people, culture, food and environment. It can often be transformative. Therewith the concept is based on very similar mechanisms as for example experiential education, experiential knowledge, experiential interior design, and experiential marketing.

== About ==
Experiential travel can emphasize different areas of local life – culinary, culture, history, shopping, nature or social life – and can therewith be the basis for a holistic travel experience. The goal is to more deeply understand a travel destination's culture, people and history by connecting with it more than just by visiting it. Therefore, the traveler usually gets in touch with locals who give guidance how to experience a place. This can be a friend, an accommodation host or another person.

Experiential travel tends to focus on travel that is inspirational, personalized and/ or creates a path to self-discovery. Examples include driving a tank and shooting military weaponry at a test range, flying an airplane under instruction, and mining for gold or diamonds. Other mock experiences include reenactments of historical events, fighting a fire at a training facility, and running through a maze.

== History ==
The term "experiential travel" is already mentioned in books and publications from 1985 – however, it has become a more popular market trend in recent years. In 2017, 65% of United States travelers preferred 'experiencing something new' over 'feeling rested and recharged'.

== See also ==
- Adventure travel
- Culinary tourism
- Cultural tourism
- Sex tourism
- Volunteer tourism
