= FNFL =

FNFL could refer to:

- Forces Navales Françaises Libres, also known as the Free French Naval Forces.
- Far North Football League, an Australian rules football competition based in South Australia.
- Fortescue National Football League, an Australian rules football competition based around the Fortescue River in Western Australia.
