= Coober Pedy Golf Club =

Golf club in South Australia

Coober Pedy Opal Fields Golf Club
Club information
- Established: 1976; 50 years ago
- Type: public
- Tota holes: 18
- Website: https://www.cooberpedygolfclub.com.au/
- Par: 72

Coober Pedy Opal Fields Golf Club is an 18-hole golf course that was constructed in Coober Pedy.

== History ==
The local golf course – mostly played at night with glowing balls, to avoid daytime heat – is completely free of grass, and golfers take a small piece of "turf" around to use for teeing off. As a result of correspondence between the two clubs, the Coober Pedy Opal Fields Golf Club is the only club in the world to enjoy reciprocal rights at The Royal and Ancient Golf Club of St Andrews.

== See also ==
- List of links golf courses
