= Coober Pedy =

Coober Pedy Umoona
- Town
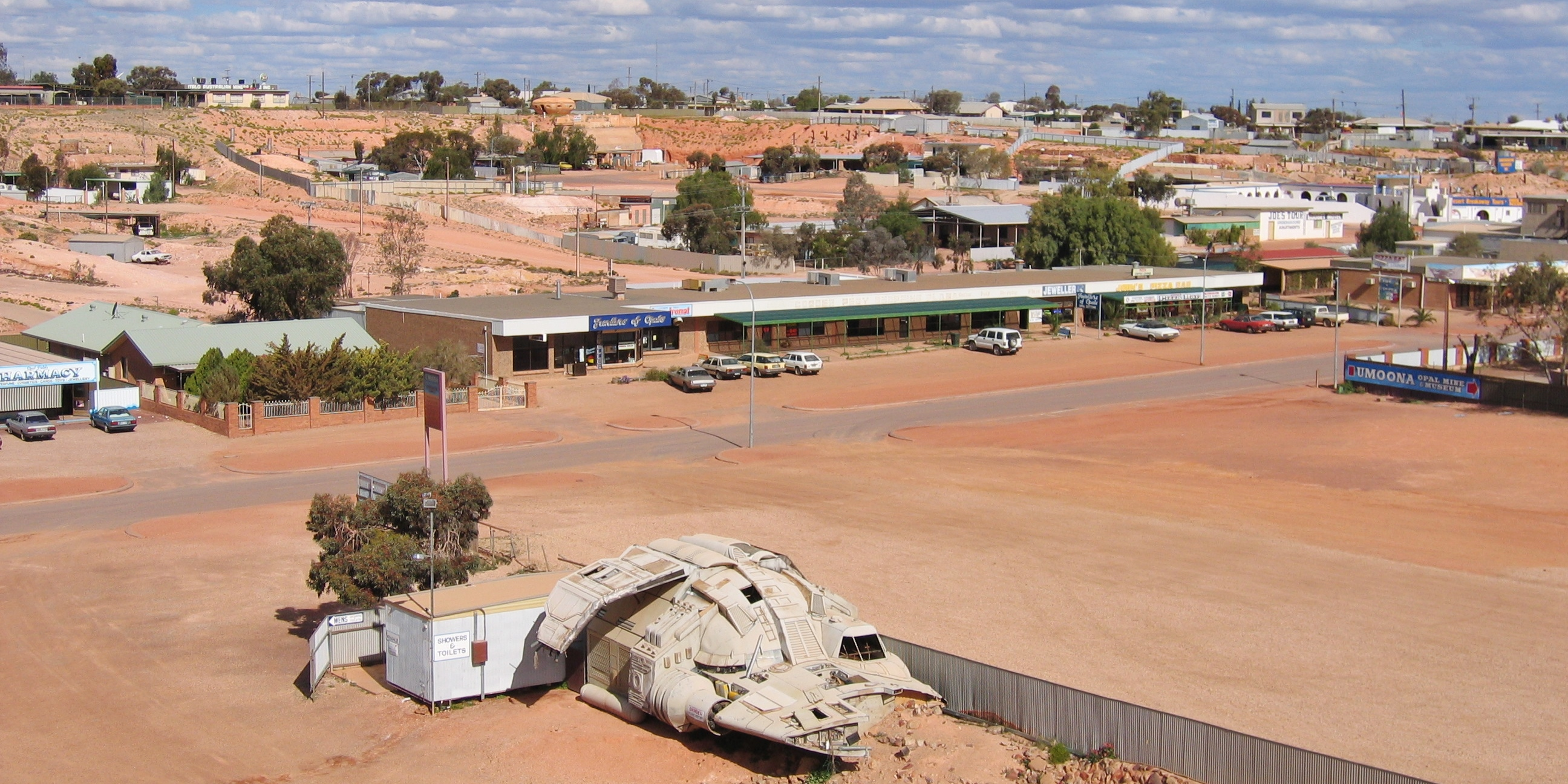
- Town centre

- Coordinates: 29°0′40″S 134°45′20″E
- Country: Australia
- State: South Australia
- Region: Far North
- LGA: District Council of Coober Pedy
- Location: 846 km (526 mi) NW of Adelaide; 688 km (428 mi) S of Alice Springs
- Established: 1915

Government
  - State electorate: Stuart
  - Federal division: Grey

Population
  - Total: 1,437 (UCL 2021)
- Postcode: 5723
- Mean max temp: 27.8 °C (82.0 °F)
- Mean min temp: 14.2 °C (57.6 °F)
- Annual rainfall: 144.2 mm (5.68 in)
Localities around Coober Pedy
Mount Willoughby	Mount Willoughby; Mount Barry	Anna Creek
Mount Clarence Station	Coober Pedy	Anna Creek
Mount Clarence Station; Ingomar	Ingomar	Mount Douall

Coober Pedy (/ˈkuːbər ˈpiːdi/) is a town in northern South Australia, 846 km (526 mi) from Adelaide via the Stuart Highway. The town is sometimes referred to as the "opal capital of the world" because of the quantity of precious opals mined there. A blower truck is raised above the town sign, representing the importance of opal mining to the town's history. Coober Pedy is also renowned for its below-ground dwellings, called "dugouts", which are built in this fashion due to the scorching daytime heat.

The name "Coober Pedy" is thought to derive from the Kokatha-Barngarla term kupa-piti, which translates to "whitefellas' hole", but in 1975 the local Aboriginal people of the town adopted the name Umoona, which means "long life" and is also their name for the mulga tree.

== History ==
Aboriginal people have a longstanding connection with the area. Western Desert people consider the area to have traditionally been Arabana territory, the area being associated with speakers of a western Arabana dialect called Midlaliri (the last speaker of the dialect, Sam Warrpa, died in the 1940s). Other groups had ties to the region, most notably the Kokatha people and also the Yankunytjatjara and Antakirinja. In addition, Western Desert people from much further west used to travel to the Stuart Range to obtain stone from the quarries there (quartz was sought after for axes and small knives).

The name of the town (decided in 1920) is thought to derive from the words in the Kokatha language, kupa piti, usually translated as "whitefella" and "hole in the ground", or guba bidi, "white man's holes", relating to white people's mining activities. (Note: Also reported as meaning "boys' waterhole" in some sources.) Further investigation into the words by linguists shows that kupa may have originated from the Parnkalla language and that piti may be the Kokatha word specifically created for "quarry" (a white man's activity).

In 1858, Scottish-born John McDouall Stuart was the first European explorer to pass near the site of Coober Pedy.

On 1 February 1915, Wille Hutchison discovered the first opal in the area, after which the town was established. Opal miners started moving in around 1916.

In 1920, five years later, a meeting settled on the name of Coober Pedy, when a post office was established.

In July 1975, the local Aboriginal people of Coober Pedy adopted the name Umoona, which means "long life" and is also their name for the Acacia aneura, or mulga tree, which is plentiful in the area. The name has since been used for various establishments in the town (Umoona Opal Mine and Museum, Umoona Community Art Centre, Umoona Tjutagku Health Service Aboriginal Corporation).

== Location and governance ==
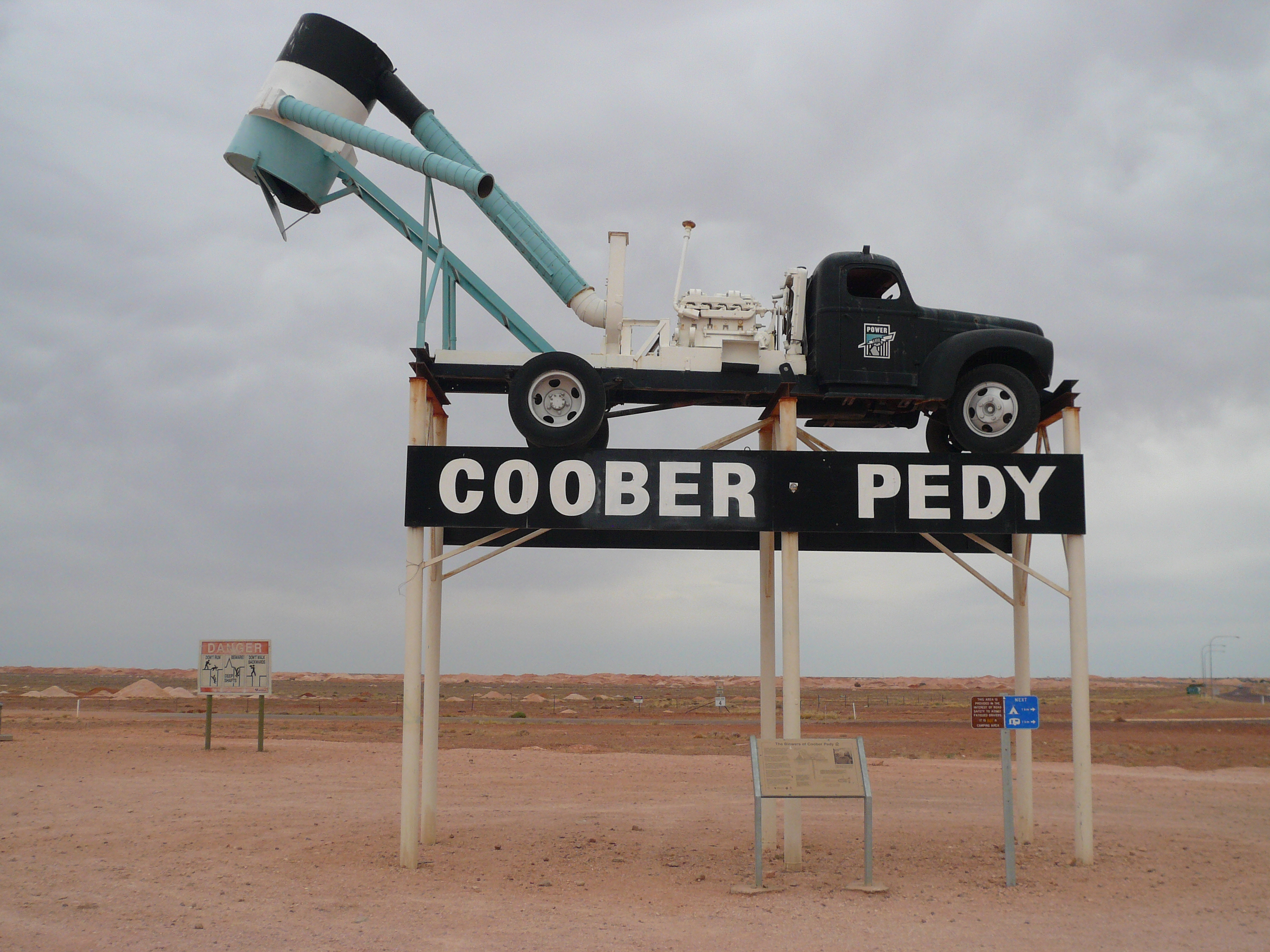
Town sign, with blower truck

Coober Pedy is about halfway between Adelaide and Alice Springs, in the Far North region of South Australia.

It falls within the electoral district of Stuart for the state government elections, and in the federal government Division of Grey.

== Geography ==
Coober Pedy is situated on the edge of the erosional scarp of the Stuart Ranges, on beds of sandstone and siltstone 30 metres (100 ft) deep and topped with a stony, treeless desert. Very little plant life exists in town due to the region's low rainfall, the high cost of water, and lack of topsoil.

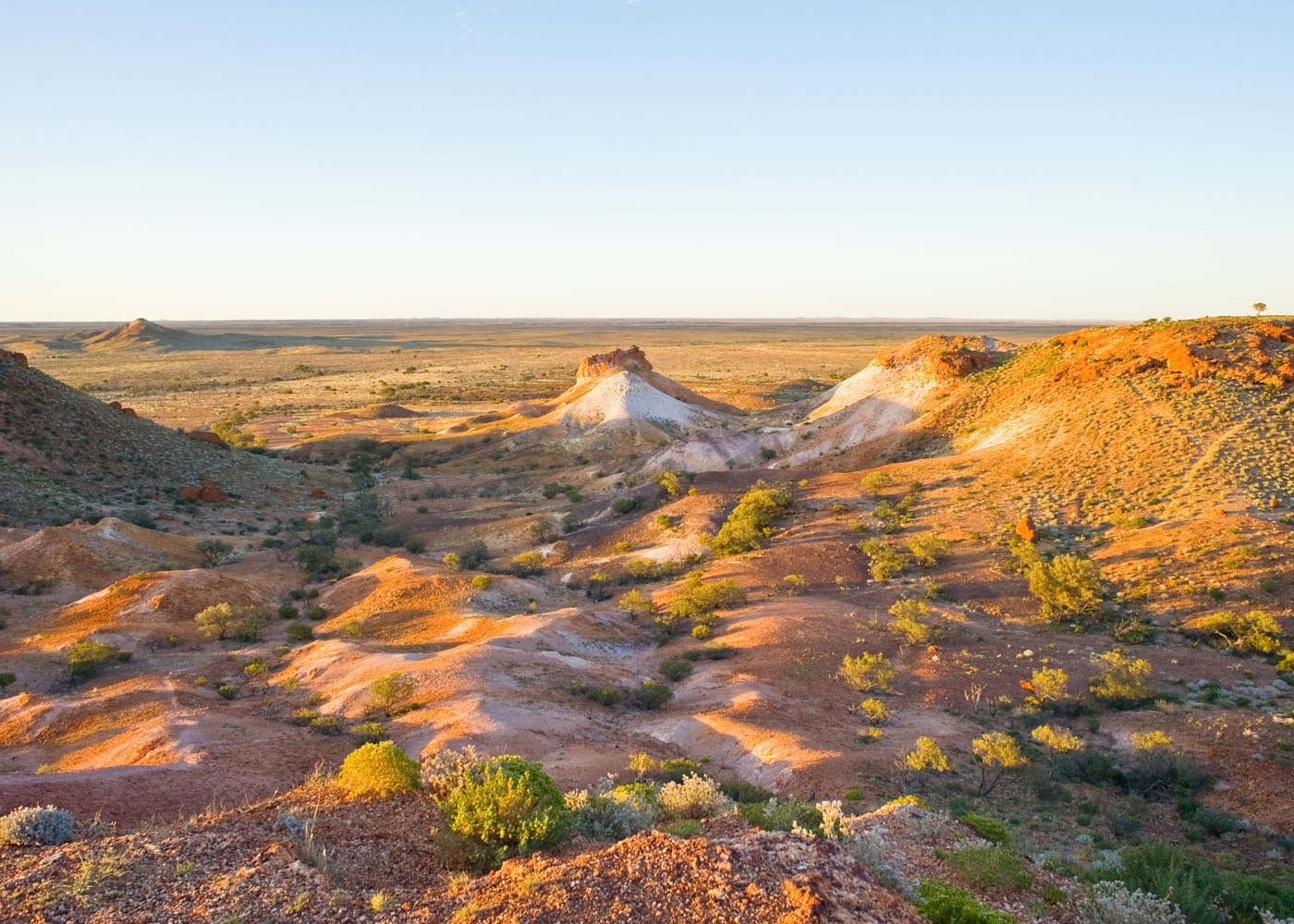
Coober Pedy – sunset on the Breakways

The harsh summer desert temperatures mean that many residents prefer to live in caves bored into the hillsides (known as "dugouts"). A standard three-bedroom cave home with lounge, kitchen, and bathroom can be excavated out of the rock in the hillside for a price similar to building a house on the surface. However, dugouts remain at a constant temperature, while surface buildings need air conditioning, especially during the summer months, when temperatures often exceed 40 °C (104 °F). The relative humidity rarely exceeds 20% on these hot days, and the skies are usually cloud-free. The average maximum temperature is 30–32 °C (86–90 °F), but it can get quite cool in the winter.

The town's water supply, managed by the District Council which operates a bore and associated treatment plant, comes from the Great Artesian Basin. Problems with ageing pipes, high water loss, and lack of subsidies contribute to consumer water charges being the highest in South Australia.

=== Climate ===
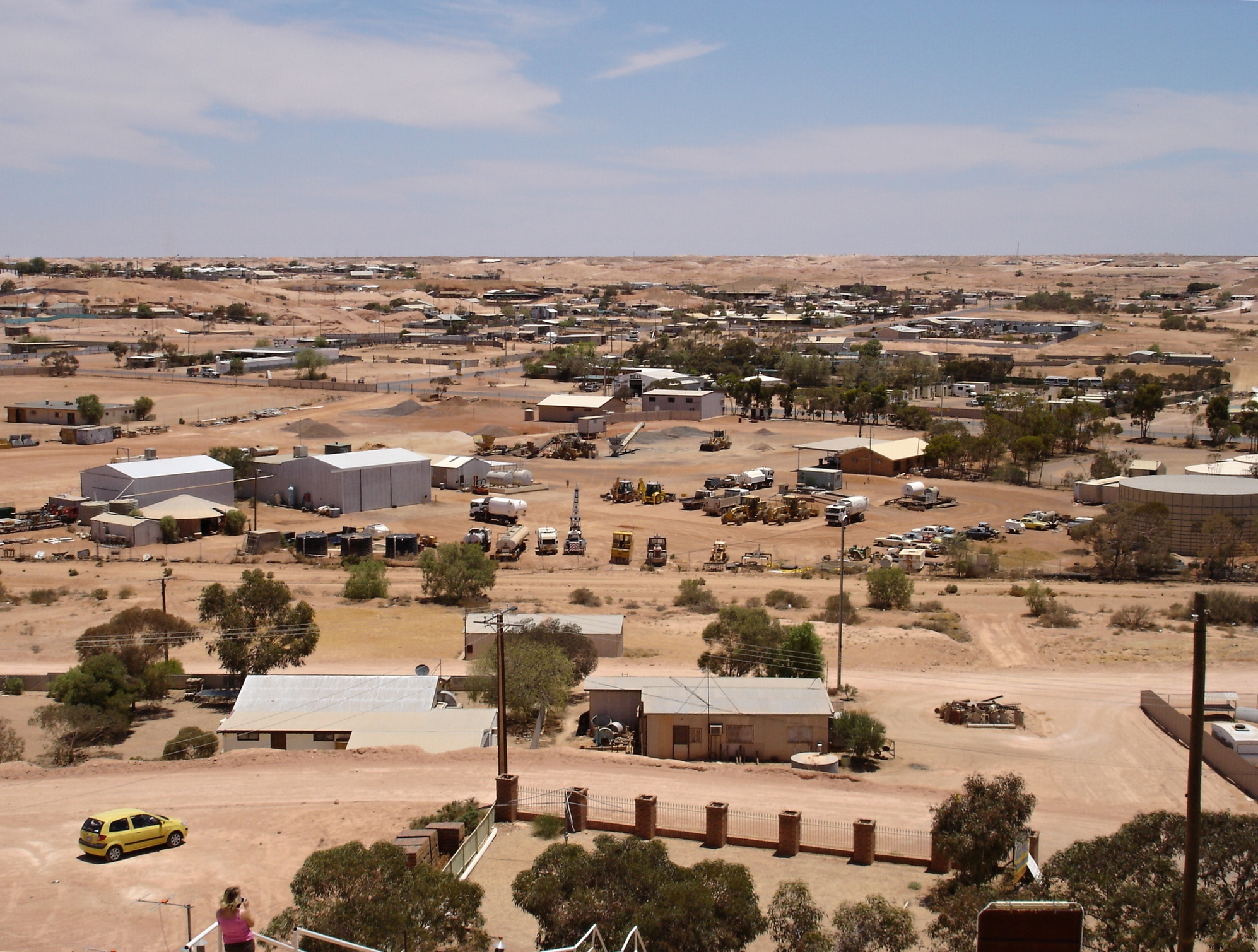
Coober Pedy, March 2005

Coober Pedy has a hot desert climate (Köppen: BWh), with very hot summers and mild winters. There is great seasonal variation due to the town's inland location. Average maxima vary between 36.7 °C (98.1 °F) in January and 18.4 °C (65.1 °F) in June; average minima range between 22.2 °C (72.0 °F) in January and 6.3 °C (43.3 °F) in July. The mean annual precipitation is among the lowest in Australia: 144.2 millimetres (5.68 in). It is well-distributed, spread across 38.8 precipitation days. The town is very sunny, experiencing 173.8 clear days and only 63.7 cloudy days per year. Extreme temperatures have ranged from 48.3 °C (118.9 °F) on 20 December 2019 and 30 January 2026 to −2.0 °C (28.4 °F) on 30 July 1976. (Note: Extremes were combined from the closed Coober Pedy station and the current weather station at the airport.)

Coober Pedy was flooded when 115 millimetres (4.5 in) – more than three-quarters of the mean annual rainfall – was recorded in 24 hours on 10 April 2014.

Climate data for Coober Pedy (29º01'48"S, 134º43'12"E, 225 m AMSL) (1994–2024 normals, extremes to 1965)
Month	Jan	Feb	Mar	Apr	May	Jun	Jul	Aug	Sep	Oct	Nov	Dec	Year
Record high °C (°F)	48.3 (118.9)	48.1 (118.6)	44.4 (111.9)	41.5 (106.7)	33.5 (92.3)	32.1 (89.8)	32.0 (89.6)	36.4 (97.5)	39.4 (102.9)	44.8 (112.6)	45.9 (114.6)	48.3 (118.9)	48.3 (118.9)
Mean daily maximum °C (°F)	36.7 (98.1)	35.6 (96.1)	32.2 (90.0)	27.2 (81.0)	22.0 (71.6)	18.4 (65.1)	18.7 (65.7)	21.2 (70.2)	25.8 (78.4)	28.9 (84.0)	32.1 (89.8)	34.6 (94.3)	27.8 (82.0)
Mean daily minimum °C (°F)	22.2 (72.0)	21.5 (70.7)	18.6 (65.5)	14.4 (57.9)	9.9 (49.8)	6.9 (44.4)	6.3 (43.3)	7.6 (45.7)	11.2 (52.2)	14.2 (57.6)	17.6 (63.7)	20.0 (68.0)	14.2 (57.6)
Record low °C (°F)	9.4 (48.9)	10.6 (51.1)	9.2 (48.6)	5.0 (41.0)	1.4 (34.5)	−0.1 (31.8)	−2.0 (28.4)	0.6 (33.1)	1.7 (35.1)	3.9 (39.0)	6.7 (44.1)	10.0 (50.0)	−2.0 (28.4)
Average precipitation mm (inches)	14.8 (0.58)	14.3 (0.56)	10.5 (0.41)	14.3 (0.56)	9.4 (0.37)	13.4 (0.53)	4.8 (0.19)	6.6 (0.26)	8.2 (0.32)	13.1 (0.52)	15.4 (0.61)	19.3 (0.76)	144.2 (5.68)
Average precipitation days (≥ 0.2 mm)	2.9	2.4	2.4	3.0	2.8	3.9	2.7	2.8	3.1	3.5	4.7	4.6	38.8
Average afternoon relative humidity (%)	18	22	22	26	33	41	37	29	24	22	21	20	26
Average dew point °C (°F)	4.0 (39.2)	5.7 (42.3)	3.5 (38.3)	3.1 (37.6)	3.5 (38.3)	3.4 (38.1)	1.7 (35.1)	−0.1 (31.8)	0.1 (32.2)	0.1 (32.2)	1.7 (35.1)	3.3 (37.9)	2.5 (36.5)
Source: Bureau of Meteorology (1994–2024 normals, extremes to 1965)

== Mining ==
=== Opals ===
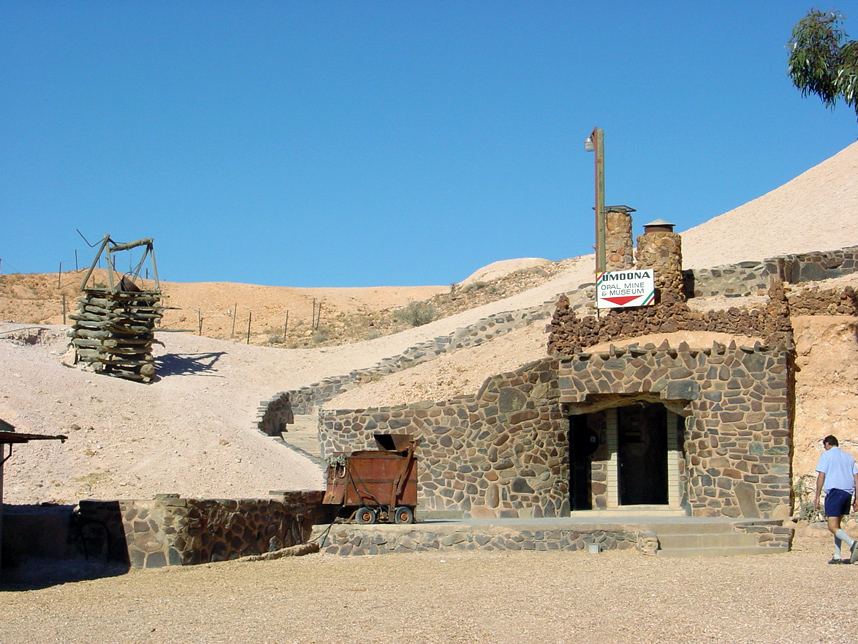
Umoona Opal Mine

Oral history suggests that Aboriginal people knew where opals were in the Coober Pedy area, but did not value them because food was more important. In 1915, the first opals near Coober Pedy were found by a gold prospector. Earlier opal mining in Australia was mainly concentrated in New South Wales in towns such as Lightning Ridge and White Cliffs, and nearby Andamooka in South Australia.

Following World War I, returning soldiers sought employment in the opal mines, which were expanding rapidly, and following World War II many refugees, veterans, and immigrants from Southern and Eastern Europe found employment in the mines as well. At some points in the post-war period, up to 60 per cent of miners at Coober Pedy had Southern or Eastern European ancestry. Aboriginal people were also employed in the industry from the 1940s. A 2016 thesis by M. Harding suggests "the small-scale and informal nature of the opal industry attracted Aboriginal people because of the level of workplace autonomy it provided", and it also accommodated their cultural practices. While opal mining around the town had slumped in the early 1940s, it picked up after a local Aboriginal woman, Tottie Bryant, discovered a large deposit in 1945.

In August 1956 at the Eight Mile opal field, the Olympic Australis opal was found approximately 30 feet below the ground. It is the largest and one of the most valuable opals mined to date, consisting of 99 per cent gem opal (the other 1 per cent being soil). The Olympic Australis measures 280 by 120 by 115 millimetres (11.0 in × 4.7 in × 4.5 in) and weighs 17,000 carats (3,400 g). It was valued at AU$2,500,000 (roughly US$1,708,000) in both 1997 and 2005, and is currently held in the offices of Altmann & Cherny Ltd, one of Australia's most prominent vendors and authorities on opals.

Starting around the 1970s, mechanized opal mining became more common, allowing for faster and comparatively less dangerous shaft digging, tunnelling, and tailings removal.

By 1999, there were more than 250,000 mine shaft entrances in the area. Fossicking and mining laws discouraged large-scale mining by allowing each prospector a 165-square-foot (15.3 m^{2}) claim. These laws were also enacted in response to the hazards of walking around the town, with many mine shafts unmarked, abandoned, or merely dangerous to navigate. Coober Pedy supplies most of the world's gem-quality opal; it has over 70 opal fields. An opalized fossil skeleton of an Umoonasaurus, nicknamed "Eric", was discovered in the Zorba Extension Opal Field near to Coober Pedy. The fossil is now in the Westpac Long Gallery of the Australian Museum.

Around 95 per cent of the opals mined today are gray, white potch, or common opals, which are less valuable as they do not have opalescence. Black opals and other precious opals are rarer, but much more valuable for their opalescence and other desirable optical properties.

=== Other minerals ===
In May 2009, South Australian Premier Mike Rann opened the $1.15 billion Prominent Hill Mine, 130 kilometres (81 mi) southeast of Coober Pedy. The copper-gold mine is operated by OZ Minerals.

In August 2010, Rann opened the Cairn Hill iron ore/copper/gold mine operated by IMX Resources near Coober Pedy. It was the first new iron ore mining area opened in South Australia since the 19th century. Due to low iron ore prices, the Cairn Hill mine was closed in June 2014. It was sold to Cu-River Mining who reopened the mine in 2016.

=== Oil reserves ===
In 2013, a potentially significant tight oil (oil trapped in oil-bearing shales) resource was found near the outskirts of Coober Pedy in the Arckaringa Basin. This resource was estimated to hold between 3.5 and 223 billion barrels (560×10^{6} and 35,450×10^{6} m^{3}) of oil, providing the potential for Australia to become a net oil exporter.

== Tourism ==
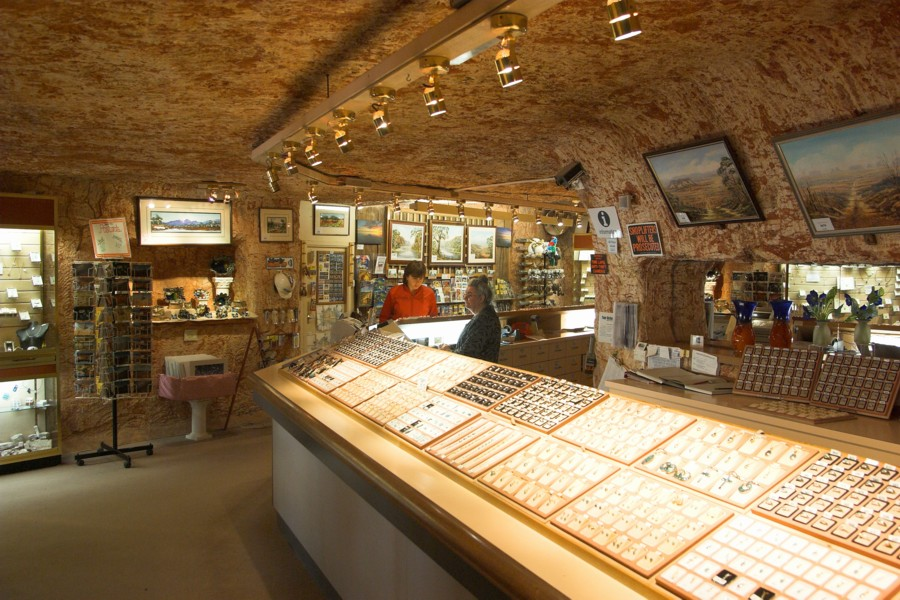
An underground jewellery shop in Coober Pedy

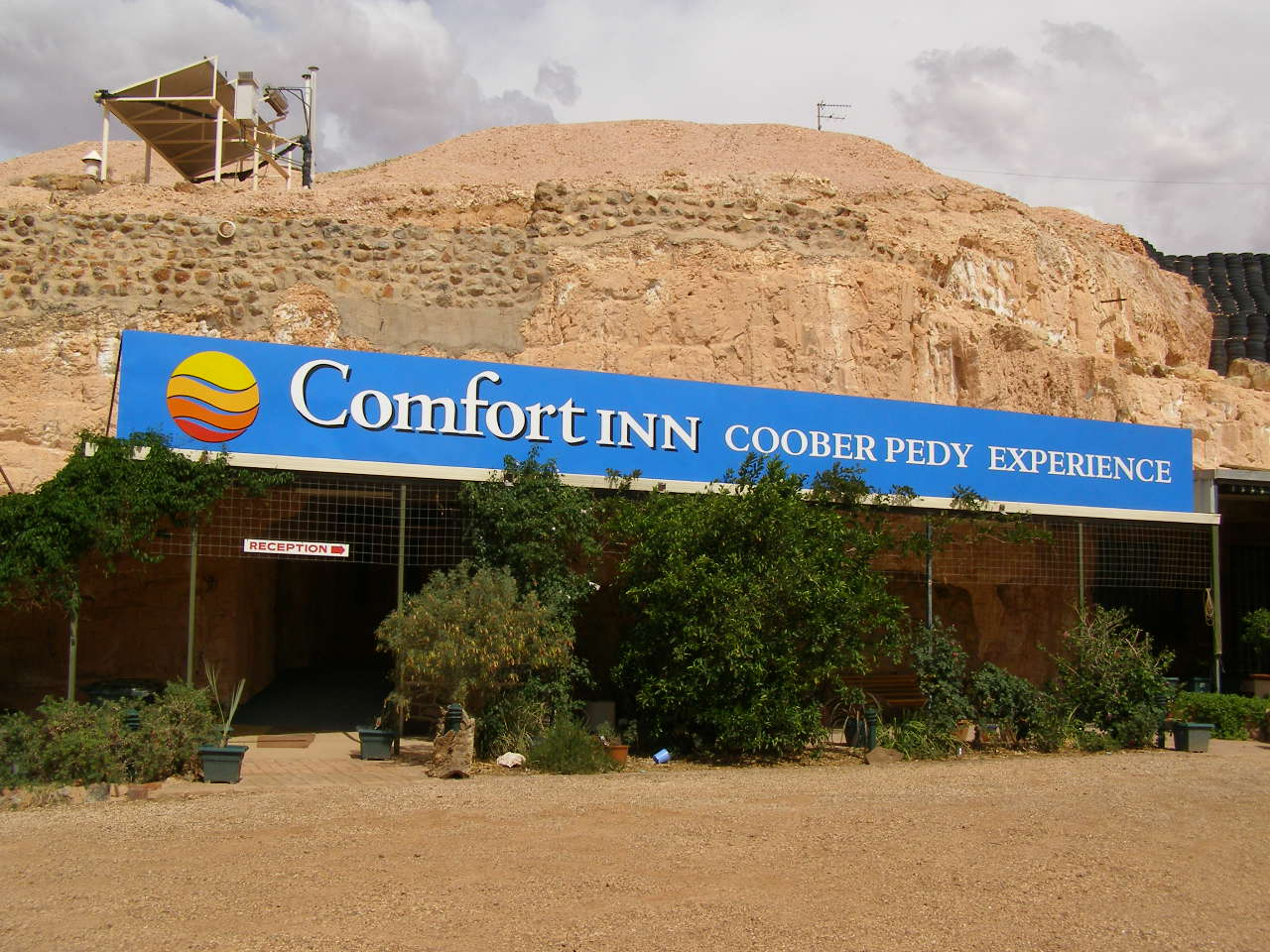
Entrance to an underground motel, Coober Pedy, 2007

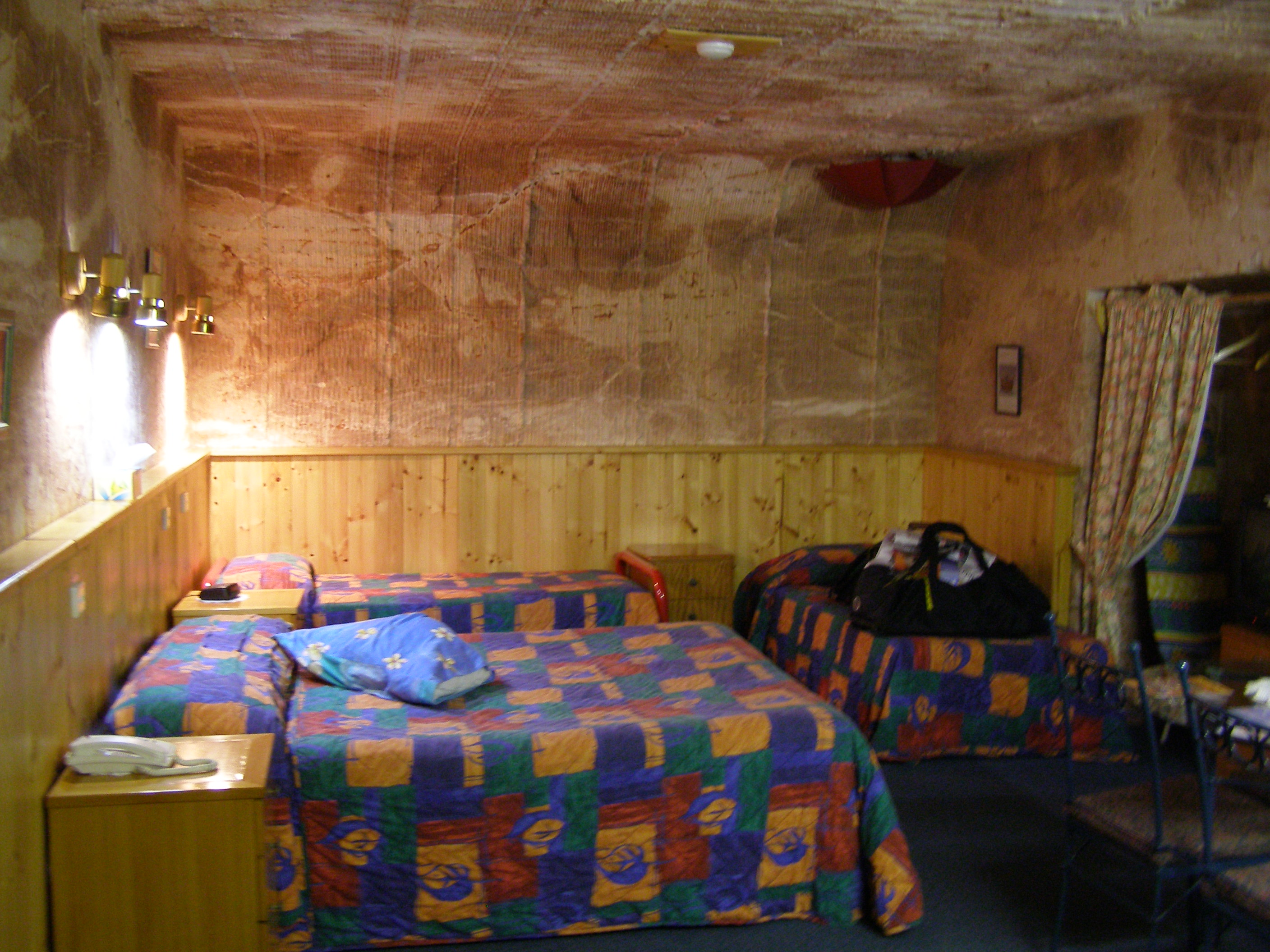
Coober Pedy underground motel room

Coober Pedy is famous for its underground accommodation. The town has become a popular stopover point and tourist destination, especially since 1987, when the sealing of the Stuart Highway was completed.

Coober Pedy today relies as much on tourism as the opal mining industry to provide the community with employment and sustainability.

Visitor attractions in Coober Pedy include the mines, the graveyard and the underground churches (the Serbian Orthodox Church and the Catholic Church). There are several motels offering underground accommodation, ranging from a few rooms to the entire motel being a dug-out. The hybrid Coober Pedy Solar Power Station supplies power to the off-grid area.

The dugout of crocodile hunter and WWII Latvian National Armed Forces soldier Arvid Blumenthal (or "Crocodile Harry") is a famous tourist spot, known as "Crocodile Harry's Underground Nest". It is known for its bone collection, art and graffiti, and messages written by tourists. The dugout is featured as a set in movies, including Pitch Black and Mad Max Beyond Thunderdome.

The Umoona Opal Mine and Museum is a popular attraction.

The annual Coober Pedy Opal Festival takes place in June, with the 35th festival occurring in 2024.

=== Heritage sites ===
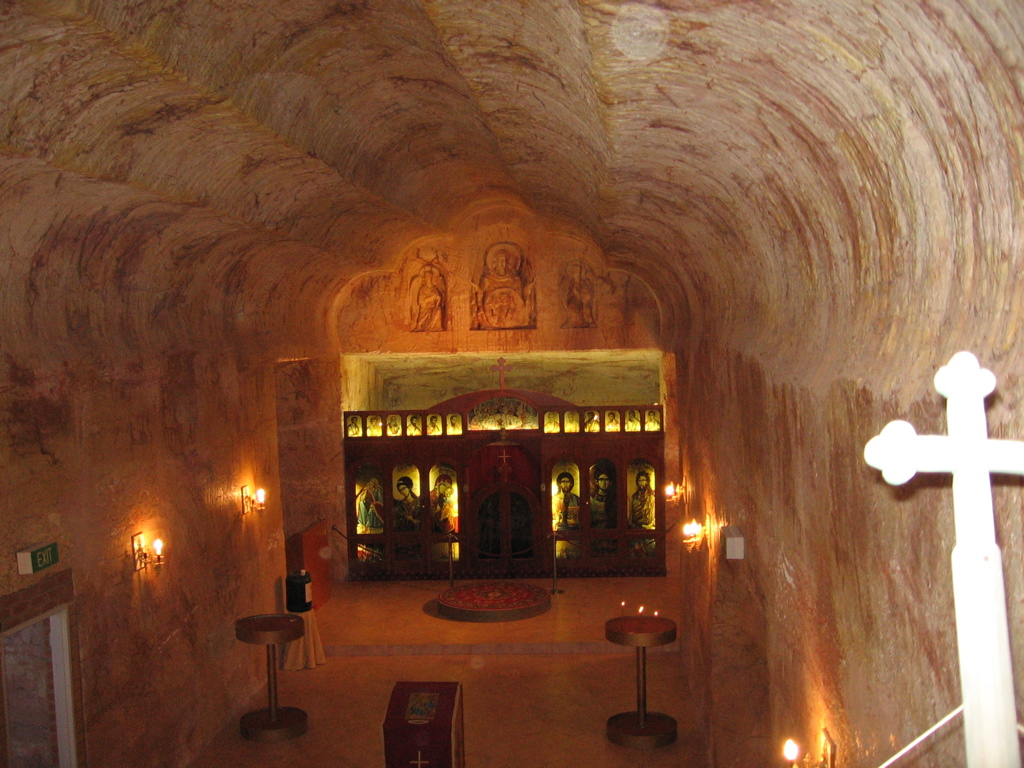
The underground Church of St Elijah, a Serbian Orthodox Church

Coober Pedy has a number of heritage-listed sites, including:

- 13 Hutchison Street: Three-Roomed Dugout
- 9 Hutchison Street: Coober Pedy Catholic Church and Presbytery

== Amenities and services ==
The Umoona Tjutagku Health Service Aboriginal Corporation was established in 2005 to provide health services for local Aboriginal people.

== Local media ==
Coober Pedy is home to the Coober Pedy Regional Times, a free community publication released fortnightly since 15 March 2001. Under a previous name, it had begun as a newsletter called the Coober Pedy Times, which was first issued in August 1982, itself continuing from a publication known as Opal Chips. After some financial difficulties, the Times was bought by its editor, Margaret McKay, in 2006 and now includes online versions.

Coober Pedy is served by both local and national radio and television services. The government-owned Australian Broadcasting Corporation provides three broadcast radio stations — local radio ABC North & West SA 106.1FM and the national networks ABC Radio National 107.7FM and Triple J 101.3FM.

Community radio is provided by indigenous broadcaster CAAMA Radio 102.9FM and Coober Pedy's own Dusty Radio 104.5FM. Commercial radio is provided by Flow FM 99.7.

Five broadcast television services operate in Coober Pedy: commercial stations Imparja Television, Southern Cross Central (now branded as Seven Central), 10 Central, the government-owned ABC and SBS.

== Sport and recreation ==
The local golf course – mostly played at night with glowing balls, to avoid daytime heat – is completely free of grass, and golfers take a small piece of "turf" around to use for teeing off. As a result of correspondence between the two clubs, the Coober Pedy Golf Club is the only club in the world to enjoy reciprocal rights at The Royal and Ancient Golf Club of St Andrews.

The town also had an Australian rules football club, the Coober Pedy Saints, established in 2004, which competed in the Far North Football League (formerly the Woomera & Districts Football League). Due to the town's isolation, to play matches the Saints made round trips of over 900 kilometres (560 mi) to Roxby Downs, where the rest of the league's teams are located. The team folded in 2016.

The town has a drive-in theatre. It opened in 1965, but became less popular after 1980 with the arrival of television to the town, and ceased regular operation in 1984. It was re-opened in 1996, and with the closure of the Mainline Drive-in at Gepps Cross in February 2022, became the last drive-in in the state.

== Art centre ==
A board for the Umoona Community Art Centre was established in 2021, but needs government funding to establish a permanent location in the town. A group of artists has joined the APY Art Centre Collective, which helps to create employment opportunities for Indigenous artists in the region. An exhibition in the Adelaide gallery of the collective in September 2021 featured the work of 24 of these artists.

== In philately ==
A rare exhibition cachet, signed by Coober Pedy postmaster Alfred P. North, was discovered in Memphis, Tennessee, by philatelist David Saks on 3 February 2016. To date, it is the only known example of this cachet in the world.

== In popular culture ==
Both the town and its hinterland, for different reasons, are photogenic and have attracted filmmakers. The town itself is the setting for several films, and its environment has also attracted movie producers. These include:

=== Films ===
- Fire in the Stone (1984)
- Mad Max Beyond Thunderdome (1985)
- Ground Zero (1987)
- The Blood of Heroes (1989)
- Until the End of the World (1991)
- Stark (1993), a TV miniseries
- The Adventures of Priscilla, Queen of the Desert (1994)
- Siam Sunset (1999)
- Pitch Black (2000)
- Red Planet (2000)
- Kangaroo Jack (2003)
- Opal Dream (2006)
- The Osiris Child: Science Fiction Volume One (2016)
- Instant Hotel Season 2 (2018)
- Mortal Kombat (2021)
- Stars on Mars (2023)
- Limbo (2023)

=== Video game ===
- Forza Horizon 3

== Transport ==
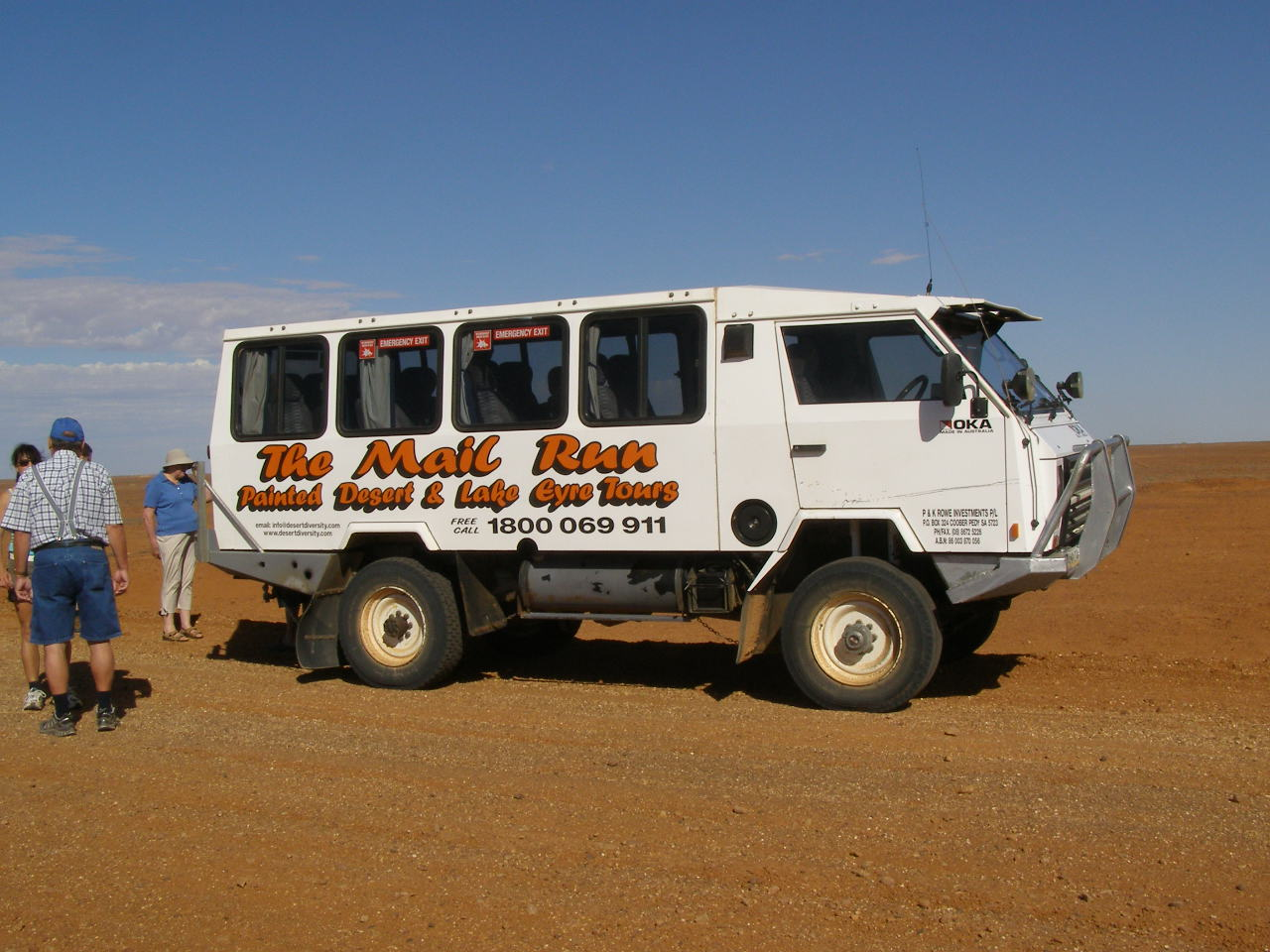
The mail truck to Oodnadatta, 2007

The town is served by daily coach services from Adelaide by Greyhound Australia. The Ghan train serves the town through the Manguri Siding, 42 kilometres (26 mi) from Coober Pedy, which is served by trains once weekly in each direction. Passengers on The Ghan are not usually allowed to disembark at Manguri unless they have prearranged transport, due to the siding's isolation and the extremely low temperatures at night.

Coober Pedy is a gateway to the outback communities of Oodnadatta and William Creek, which are both located on the Oodnadatta Track. There is a twice-a-week mail run from Coober Pedy to these communities and other outback homesteads. It carries the mail, general freight and passengers.

Rex Airlines also has direct flights to Adelaide, from Coober Pedy Airport.

Preceding station	Journey Beyond	Following station
Alice Springs One-way operation	The Ghan towards Adelaide only	Adelaide Terminus

== See also ==
- Kupa Piti Kungka Tjuta
