= Stuart Range, South Australia =

Low upland in South Australia

Stuart Range
- Location within South Australia

Highest point
- Coordinates: 29°04′31″S 134°50′08″E

Geography
- Location: Coober Pedy

The Stuart Range is a low upland in central South Australia, extending about 170 kilometres (110 mi) with a north-west to south-east alignment and passing within 10 kilometres (6.2 mi) to the south-east of Coober Pedy.

== Name ==
The range is named after John McDouall Stuart, the first European explorer to pass through the area, in 1858.

== Formation ==
During the Late Cretaceous and Tertiary, central Australia experienced crustal compression resulting in very broad, low-amplitude folding, and the Stuart Range formed on a basement upwarp.

Underlying the Stuart Range, the folded sediments include the Early Cretaceous (Aptian-Albian) Bulldog Shale, consisting of grey marine mudstones. Where the Bulldog Shale has been exposed at the surface for long periods it has been subjected to deep chemical weathering, resulting in bleaching and the "multi-hued, picturesque colouration" found in the Arckaringa-Stuart Range landscape.

The prolonged chemical weathering also dissolved silica which, transported through the regolith by the movement of groundwater, precipitated as the ambient conditions changed, forming silcrete (a type of duricrust), with the silica forming a secondary cement binding the sediment grains into sheets of hard, indurated rock, generally parallel to the land surface.

This occurred at deeper levels, at the intersection with the groundwater table (forming groundwater silcrete), or close to the surface, within the soil profile (forming pedogenic silcrete). Groundwater silcretes typically formed in more localised, topographically lower settings such as valley bottoms and slopes, whereas pedogenic silcrete tended to form extensive sheets over very large areas. Over long periods of time, as the landscape was lowered further by weathering and erosion, the silcrete became exposed at the surface as a lag gravel, an armoured carapace of gibbers (also known as a desert pavement), protecting the weaker regolith below from mechanical erosion. The resulting landscapes are relatively flat, undulating plains with low relief.

Throughout the Tertiary the Stuart Range has been an important palaeodrainage divide, between the Eucla and Lake Eyre basins.

In places where fluvial erosion has been more active, gullies have dissected the palaeosurface of the upland, forming a characteristic tableland topography where a continuing process of scarp retreat leaves behind mesas and buttes, which persist until their residual silcrete capping is finally lost.
