= Coober Pedy Solar Power Station =

Cancelled off-grid solar power station in South Australia

Coordinates: 29.0285°S 134.77339°E

The Coober Pedy Solar Power Station was planned to be Australia's largest off-grid solar power station, located at remote Coober Pedy in South Australia's far north. The project would cost $7.1 million and the Australian Government promised providing $3.55 million under its Renewable Remote Power Generation program. When completed at the end of 2009, the power station was to consist of 26 solar dishes, each one 14 metres high, which would track the arc of the Sun. The power plant was to generate about 1860 megawatt-hours per year, 13 per cent of Coober Pedy's total electricity requirements. It would cut Diesel fuel consumption by up to 520,000 litres a year, saving 1,500 tonnes of greenhouse gas emissions.

In 2014, a new proposal was raised to create a hybrid solar, wind and Diesel power system for Coober Pedy. The contract was let to Energy Developments without an open tender process. The project will convert Coober Pedy's electricity from being generated 100% from Diesel to only 30% Diesel, with the other 70% provided by the combination of renewable energy sources. Energy Developments Limited is the developer for the new system. It has been supplying the electricity for Coober Pedy since 2004.

A facility integrating 4 MW of wind power, 1 MW of solar power and a 1 MW, 500 kWh battery was operational in 2019.

The project plans to combine 1MW of solar PV and 4MW of wind energy generation and a 1MW, 0.5MWh battery storage and inverter system as well as a range of additional proven technologies to displace up to 70% of the current diesel fired generation at Coober Pedy.
