= Far North Football League =

Australian football competition in South Australia

The Far North Football League (formerly the Woomera & Districts Football League) is an Australian rules football competition based in the Far North region of South Australia. It is an affiliated member of the South Australian National Football League.

== Current clubs ==
Club	Jumper	Nickname	Est.	Years in FNFL	FNFL Senior Premierships	
Club	Jumper	Nickname	Est.	Years in FNFL	Total	Years
East Roxby (Andamooka 1989-2014)		Roos	1988	1989–	4	1990, 1995, 2003, 2007
Hornridge		Magpies	1997	1997–	6	2001, 2002, 2012, 2018, 2019, 2021
Olympic Dam		Devils	1986	1987–	14	1987, 1992, 1993, 1994, 1996, 1997, 1998, 2004, 2005, 2006, 2008, 2009, 2011, 2022
Roxby Districts		Miners	1986	1986–	16	1986, 1988, 1989, 1991, 1999, 2000, 2010, 2013, 2014, 2015, 2016, 2017, 2023, 2024, 2025, 2026

All games are played at Roxby Downs Town Oval in Roxby Downs.

== Former clubs ==
Club	Jumper	Nickname	Former League	Est.	Years in FNFL	FNFL Senior Premierships		Fate
Club	Jumper	Nickname	Former League	Est.	Years in FNFL	Total	Years	Fate
1.L.C.P.S. (Signals)			–	1949	1949-1951	1	1949	Folded after 1951 season
Bungala			NDFA	1992	1992-1993	0	-	Folded after 1993 season
Centrals		Bloods	–	1955	1955-1988	4	1960, 1976, 1980, 1984	Folded after 1988 season
Contractors			–	1949	1949-1951	1	1951	Folded after 1951 season
Coober Pedy		Saints	–	1995	1995, 2004–2016	0	-	Folded after 2016 season
J.D.S.C.S		Warriors	–	1985	1985-1987	0	-	Folded after 1987 season
Koolymilka		Magpies	–	1950	1950-1958, 1960, 1962–1987	6	1953, 1972, 1973, 1975, 1983, 1985	Folded after 1987 season
Leigh Creek			NDFA	1992	1992-1993	0	-	Folded after 1993 season
LRWER			–	1947	1949	0	-	Folded after 1949 season
Mount Gunson		Redlegs	–	1975	1975-1983	2	1981, 1982	Folded after 1983 season
R.A.A.F			–	1949	1949-1966	0	-	Folded after 1966 season
R.A.E			–	1949	1949	0	-	Folded after 1949 season
Umeewarra		Hawks	–	1994	1994-1996	0	-	Folded after 1996 season
Village			–	1949	1949-1976, 1984–1985	11	1952, 1954, 1957, 1959, 1961, 1963, 1965, 1967, 1969, 1970, 1971	Merged with Works in 1977 to form Woomera North. Folded after 1985 season.
Woomera		Rockets	–	1989	1989-1992	0	-	Folded after 1992 season
Woomera North		Eagles	–	1977	1977-1983	3	1977, 1978, 1979	Voted itself out of existence after 1983 season to allow Village to re-form
Works		Tigers	–	1949	1949-1976, 1979	9	1950, 1955, 1956, 1958, 1962, 1964, 1966, 1968, 1974	Merged with Village in 1977 to form Woomera North

== Brief history ==
The Woomera Football League (WFL) was formed in 1949. The predominance of public service and defence employment in the region was reflected in early participating clubs which included Works & Housing, Contractors, Koolymilka, Lines & Construction, LRWER (Long Range Weapons Experimental Range), RAAF (Royal Australian Air Force), RAE (Royal Australian Engineers - Army). By 1960 the clubs consisted of Works, Village, Centrals, RAAF and Koolymilka. RAAF withdrew in 1966 and Works similarly in 1976. Mount Gunson joined in 1975 and ceased in 1983. Woomera North joined in 1977. This was a direct result of Works and Village unable to field separate sides so a new team was formed. Woomera North voted itself out of existence in 1984 and a Village team re-entered the competition which then only consisted of 3 teams viz. Koolymilka, Central and Village. Another interesting team was the J.D.S.C.S. Warriors who played between 1985 & 1987. The team was mainly made up of USA Servicemen from the Joint Defence Space Communication Station located at Nurrungar just outside Woomera. In 3 years they only won 2 matches but did play in a final series.

== Woomera Football League Premiers and Runners-up 1949–1985 ==
Year	Premiers	Premiership Coach	Premiership Captain	Runners-up	Final scores
1949	1 L.C.P.S. (Signals)	Major Maurice Bennett	Cpl. William Albert "Peter" Lee	Works	5.12.(42) to 5.11(41)
1950	Works	Norm "Bargie" Williams	William "Bill" McGuire	R.A.A.F.	15.17(107) to 2.5(17)
1951	Contractors	Unknown	M C McEvoy	Works	8.9(57) to 7.10(52)
1952	Village	William "Bill" Novak	Sig. F Carlson	Works	6.3(39) to 1.7(13)
1953	Koolymilka	Donald "Neil" Kerley	Donald "Neil" Kerley	Works	5.12(42) to 5.2(32)
1954	Village	William "Bill" Novak	Ken Moylan	Works	6.8(44) to 5.3.(33)
1955	Works	William "Bill" Butterfield	William "Bill" Butterfield	R.A.A.F.	15.14(104) to 10.5(65)
1956	Works	Herbert "Bert" Heffernan	William "Bill" Butterfield	Centrals	8.12(60) to 1.4(10)
1957	Village	Roger O Harris	Roger O Harris	Works	6.15(51) to 5.11(41)
1958	Works (undefeated)	Don Watson	Don Watson	Centrals	13.16(94) to 9.9.(63)
1959	Village	A B Coutts	A B Coutts	Centrals	16.15(111) to 10.11(71)
1960	Centrals	Denny Scott	Denny Scott	Works	18.14(122) to 18.12(120)
1961	Village	Gil Smith	Brian Flanagan	Works	14.21(105) to 6.9(45)
1962	Works (undefeated)	Ray Whitaker	Ray Whitaker	Centrals	16.19(115) TO 7.8(50)
1963	Village	Rodger Stringer	Rodger Stringer	Centrals	14.12(96) too 4.5(29)
1964	Works	Ray Whitaker	Ray Whitaker	Village	17.18(120) to 12.15(87)
1965	Village	Ken Rau	A W "Bill" Hooker	Works	11.15(81) to 4.12(36)
1966	Works	Richard "Dick" Roennfeldt	Richard "Dick" Roennfeldt	Village	18.13(121) to 9.8(62)
1967	Village	A W "Bill" Hooker	A W "Bill" Hooker	Centrals	8.14(62) to 8.13(61)
1968	Works	Fred Wernert	Fred Wernert	Centrals	13.14(92) to 12.15(87)
1969	Village (undefeated)	Ken Rau	Peter Hardy	Centrals	17.14(116) to 2.12(24)
1970	Village	Graham Brennan	Graham Brennan	Centrals	11.11(77) to 10.12(72)
1971	Village	Graham Brennan	Graham Brennan	Works	14.11(95) to 11.7(73)
1972	Koolymilka	Theo Saunders	Theo Saunders	Village	10.13(73) to 9.8(62)
1973	Koolymilka	Herb Ellerbock	Herb Ellerbock	Works	18.13(121) to 10.13(73)
1974	Works	William "Bill" Leverington	Robert "Bob" Boyle	Koolymilka	13.6(84) to 8.12(60)
1975	Koolymilka	John Cates	John Cates	Centrals	10.22(82) to 10.7(67)
1976	Centrals (undefeated)	Daniel "Paddy" O'Neill	P Walters	Mount Gunson	19.22(136) to 14.11(95)
1977	Woomera North	John Payne	John Shepherdson	Centrals	14.8(92) to 10.18(78)
1978	Woomera North	John Shepherdson	John Shepherdson	Centrals	17.21(123) to 11.12(78)
1979	Woomera North	Dave Thomas	Dave Thomas	Mount Gunson	26.11(167) to 21.22(148)
1980	Centrals	Phil "Turkey" Turner	Phil "Turkey" Turner	Koolymilka	20.15(135) to 14.9(93)
1981	Mount Gunson	John Hearne	Kelly Hill	Woomera North	25.13(163) to 18.12(120)
1982	Mount Gunson	John Hearne	Kelly Hill	Woomera North	27.19 (181) to 13.12 (90)
1983	Koolymilka	David Bates	Tom Blackie	Woomera North	15.17(107) to 11.12(78)
1984	Centrals	Brendon Would	Dave Davis	Koolymilka	23.6(144) to 17.9(111)
1985	Koolymilka	Christopher "Biff" Griffiths	Scott Durman	Village	13.14(92) to 13.12(90)

== Woomera & Districts Football League Premiers and Runners-up 1986–2010 ==
Year	Premiers	Premiership Coach	Premiership Captain	Runners-up	Final scores
1986	Roxby Districts (undefeated)	Tim McLeod	Tim McLeod	Centrals	19.13 (127) to 11.14(80)
1987	Olympic Dam	Neville Crowden	Neville Crowden	Roxby Districts	15.12(102) to 7.13(55)
1988	Roxby Districts (undefeated)	Tim McLeod	Tim McLeod	Centrals	26.16(162) to 8.12(60)
1989	Roxby Districts	Stephen Dryburgh	Stephen Dryburgh	Andamooka	13.17(95) to 12.12.(84)
1990	Andamooka (undefeated)	Martin Lloyd	Martin Lloyd	Roxby Districts	29.19(193) to 11.10(76)
1991	Roxby Districts	Warren Rose	Warren Rose	Andamooka	15.7(97) to 7.15(57)
1992	Olympic Dam (undefeated)	Rod Bain	Rod Bain	Andamooka	16.17(113) to 11.12(78)
1993	Olympic Dam	Rod Bain	Tim Lange	Bungala	24.17(161) to 13.5(83)
1994	Olympic Dam	Gary Dolling	Tim Lange	Andamooka	18.8(116) to 11.13(79)
1995	Andamooka	Gavin Zani	Michael Glazbrook	Roxby Districts	12.9(81) to 7.9(51)
1996	Olympic Dam (undefeated)	Jon Caputo	Jon Caputo	Roxby Districts	12.8(80) to 9.18(72)
1997	Olympic Dam (undefeated)	Jon Caputo	Jon Caputo	Andamooka	20.14(134) to 8.7(55)
1998	Olympic Dam	Jon Caputo	Peter Lindner	Roxby Districts	12.9(81) to 12.7(79)
1999	Roxby Districts	Steve Symonds	Dave Bennett	Hornridge	13.15(93) to 4.2(26)
2000	Roxby districts	Steve Symonds	Shane Thomson	Andamooka	16.19(115) to 8.7(55)
2001	Hornridge	Graham (Spud) Murphy	Steve Daly	Roxby Districts	7.4(45) to 5.5(35)
2002	Hornridge	Graham (Spud) Murphy	Craig Hodgetts, Shane Huppatz	Andamooka	11.7(73) to 9.8(65)
2003	Andamooka	Darren Linke	Robert Kraack	Olympic Dam	15.12(102) to 7.6(48)
2004	Olympic Dam	Tim Lange	Paul Kemp	Roxby Districts	14.5(89) to 11.11(77)
2005	Olympic Dam	Wayne Turner	Nigel Shinnick	Roxby Districts	12.8(80) to 10.6(66)
2006	Olympic Dam	Wayne Turner	Nigel Shinnick	Roxby Districts	15.9(99) to 4.2(26)
2007	Andamooka	Mark Francas	Robert Kraack	Olympic Dam	15.5(95) to 10.9(69)
2008	Olympic Dam	Les Myles	Daniel Rogers	Roxby Districts	11.3(69) to 9.7(61)
2009	Olympic Dam	Les Myles	Daniel Rogers	Roxby Districts	10.19(79) to 10.7(67)
2010	Roxby Districts	Mark Dalgleish	Jarred Pyke	Olympic Dam	13.7(85) to 2.6(18)

== Far North Football League Premiers and Runners-up 2011–2026 ==
Year	Premiers	Premiership Coach	Premiership Captain	Runners-up	Final scores
2011	Olympic Dam	Scott Peek	Daniel Rogers	Andamooka	16.16(112) to 6.8(44)
2012	Hornridge	Kym Elliot	Bradley Cooper	Roxby Districts	11.11(77) to 8.6(54)
2013	Roxby Districts	Richard Prosser	Craig Hall & Cody Kenny	Hornridge	17.14(116) to 7.3(45)
2014	Roxby Districts	Richard Prosser	Craig Hall & Cody Kenny	Hornridge	17.7(109) to 8.11(59)
2015	Roxby Districts	Richard Prosser	Craig Hall	Hornridge	18.13(121) to 3.4(22)
2016	Roxby Districts	Richard Prosser & Craig Hall	James Telfer	East Roxby	10.10(70) to 8.8(56)
2017	Roxby Districts (undefeated)	Richard Prosser & Craig Hall	James Telfer	Hornridge	15.16(106) to 4.6(30)
2018	Hornridge	Bradley Cooper	Brodie Farnham	Roxby Districts	12.9(81) to 6.4(40)
2019	Hornridge	Ashley Baxter	Brendon Lehmann	East Roxby	14.12(96) to 9.7(61)
2020	No competition Covid19				
2021	Hornridge	Paul Haynes	Jack Rigden	Olympic Dam	9.9(63) to 6.6(42)
2022	Olympic Dam	Nigel Shinnick	D Cummings	Hornridge	13.13(91) to 2.5(17)
2023	Roxby Districts	Jeremy Sezun	Jack Sires, Jake Cole	Hornridge	10.5(65) to 5.10(40)
2024	Roxby Districts	Jack Sires	Lachlan Bates Liam Murphy	Hornridge	14.2(86) to 8.7(55)
2025	Roxby Districts	Jack Sires	Ryan Norten	Hornridge	9.5(59) to 7.10(52)
2026	Roxby Districts	Craig Hall, Richard Prosser	Curtley Dadleh, Macorhin Rosalia, Dylan Mostyn	Hornridge	8.14(62) to 9.7(61)

== WFL Premiership Summary 1949–1985 ==
Club	Premiers	Runners-up	WFL premierships
Village	11	4	1952, 1954, 1957, 1959, 1961, 1963, 1965, 1967, 1969, 1970, 1971.
Works	9	11	1950, 1955, 1956, 1958, 1962, 1964, 1966, 1968, 1974.
Koolymilka	6	3	1953, 1972, 1973, 1975, 1983, 1985.
Centrals	4	12	1960, 1976, 1980, 1984.
Woomera North	3	3	1977, 1978, 1979.
Mount Gunson	2	2	1981, 1982.
1.L.C.P.S. (Signals)	1	-	1949.
Contractors	1	-	1951.
R.A.A.F	-	2	-

1.L.C.P.S. (Signals) is the acronym for No.1 Line Construction Project Squadron, Royal Australian Corps of Signals.
1.L.C.P.S. (Signals) were also known as Lines and Construction.
Works were also known as Works and Housing in the early years.
Village were also known as Woomera or Town in the early years.
In 1986 the Woomera Football League changed its name to the Woomera & Districts Football League.
Since this era, with the beginning of mining operations at Olympic Dam in the 1980s, the majority of the league's clubs are actually located in the Roxby Downs area rather than Woomera, with the Coober Pedy Saints even further afield.

== WFL League B&F – Area Medal (1949–1985), Mail Medal (1953–2025), Leading Goalkicker ==
Year	Area Medal 1949–1985 Mail Medal 1953–2019	Club	Votes	Leading Goalkicker	Club	Number of Goals
1949	1st M R "Gordon" Hughes	1 L.C.P.S.	?	Unknown		
1950	1st M C McEvoy; 2nd K J Farrelly; 3rd I M Lekovich	Contractors; RAAF; 1 L.C.P.S.	? ? ?	Unknown		
1951	1st M R "Gordon" Hughes	1 L.C.P.S.	?	Unknown		
1952	1st Cpl. William Albert "Peter" Lee; 2nd Peter Turnbull; 3rd ? Noble	Koolymilka; Works; Village	16; 14; 11	Unknown		
1953	1st Donald "Neil" Kerley; 2nd Jay Mitchell; 3rd Godfrey Castieau	Koolymilka; RAAF; Works	29; 14 ?	Unknown		
1954	1st Ken Moylan	Village	?	1st C Handley; 2nd Richie Thomas; 3rd J Dalhitz	Village; Works; Village	18; 15; 11
1955	1st Rodger Stringer; 2nd Brian Flanegan; 3rd Harry Whitbread	Centrals; Village; Koolymilka	18; 16; 12	Unknown		
1956	1st Rodger Stringer; 2nd Milton Maczkowiack; 3rd = Archie Ryan; 3rd = Robert "Bob" Ortmann	Village; Works; Centrals; Works	18; 15; 14; 14	1st Roger Harris; 2nd Kevin Field; 3rd Milton Maczkowiack	Village; RAAF; Works	22; 15; 14
1957	1st = Howard Smith (Mail Medal); 1st = Don Watson* (Mail Medal); 1st = Kevin Field (Area Medal)	Koolymilka; Works; RAAF	16; 16; 16	Unknown		
1958	1st Bill Herron; 2nd Rodger Stringer; 3rd Don Watson	Works; Village; Works	24; 14; 11	1st Robert "Bob" Ortmann; 2nd Don Watson; 3rd Rodger Stringer	Works; Works; Village	34; 22; 19
1959	1st = Ken Casselton; 1st = Warren Coops*; 3rd Robert "Bob" Ortmann	RAAF; RAAF; Works	12; 12; 11	1st Fred Brown; 2nd Len Grimes; 3rd = A Young; 3rd = H Porter	Centrals; Works; RAAF; RAAF	13; 11; 10; 10
1960	1st Barry Dolphin; 2nd Robert "Bob" Ortmann; 3rd = Ken Casselton; 3rd = H Porter	Koolymilka; Works; RAAF; RAAF	24; 20; 12; 12	1st Graham Boxshall; 2nd Fred Brown; 3rd Richard "Dick" Robinson	Centrals; Centrals; Village	23; 14; 13
1961	1st Ken Rau; 2nd Colin "Bluey" Waller; 3rd Colin Bourne	Centrals; Village; RAAF	25; 19; 17	1st Des Doran; 2nd Robert "Bob" Ortmann; 3rd R Smith	Village; Works; Centrals	44; 26; 21
1962	1st Colin "Bluey" Waller; 2nd Ken Rau; 3rd Malcolm Starr	Village; Centrals; Works	17; 11; 10	1st = Ray Simpson; 1st = Roland Hollow; 3rd Ken Smith	Works; Works; Works	38; 38; 36
1963	1st Robbie Anderson; 2nd Dennis Horgan; 3rd Mick Daly	RAAF; RAAF; Works	21; 14; 12	1st Jeff Cason	Centrals	35
1964	1st Colin "Bluey" Waller; 2nd Ray Whitaker; 3rd N Sinkinson	Village; Works; RAAF	17; 13; 10	1st Terry Beckman	Village	40
1965	1st A W "Bill" Hooker; 2nd Fred Wernert; 3rd Don Lahey	Village; Centrals; Centrals	14; 12; 11	1st Fred Wernert; 2nd Terry Beckman; 3rd Trevor Overall	Centrals; Village; Village	33; 30; 28
1966	1st Tony Betts; 2nd Jurgen Wagnitz; 3rd = Gerry Tipping; 3rd = Richard "Dick" Roennfeldt	Koolymilka; Works; RAAF; Works	18; 14; 10; 10	1st Ed Moika; 2nd Daniel "Paddy" O'Neill; 3rd Fred Wernert	Centrals; RAAF; Works	47; 23; 21
1967	1st Geoff Peek; 2nd Brian Dempsey; 3rd Chris Telfer	Works; Village; Koolymilka	19; 18; 13	1st Des Treager; 2nd Brian Dempsey; 3rd Trevor Overall	Village; Village; Village	46; 31; 27
1968	1st Chris Telfer; 2nd Brian Dempsey; 3rd Graham Smith	Koolymilka; Village; Works	12; 11; 9	1st Gary Hele; 2nd Trevor Overall; 3rd Neville Johnstone	Works; Village; Centrals	39; 33; 27
1969	1st = Graham McKenzie; 1st = Alan Hancock*; 3rd = Peter Lucas; 3rd = George Christopoulos	Centrals; Koolymilka; Village; Works	15; 15; 11; 11	1st Gary Hele; 2nd Wayne Brady	Village; Centrals	63; 36
1970	1st Robert "Butch" Leverington; 2nd Graham McKenzie; 3rd Peter Hardy	Works; Centrals; Village	15; 10; 9	1st Gary Hele; 2nd Peter Hardy; 3rd Alex Herewane	Village; Village; Koolymilka	43; 41; 33
1971	1st Theo Saunders; 2nd Robert "Butch" Leverington; 3rd Peter Hardy	Koolymilka; Works; Village	19; 11; 10	1st Gary Hele	Village	30
1972	1st Gary Hele; 2nd Alex Herewane	Village; Koolymilka	? ?	1st Gary Hele; 2nd= Rodney Goodall; 2nd= Robert "Butch" Leverington; 3rd Jeff Eneberg	Village; Village; Works; Works	31; 22; 22; 19
1973	1st Max Reid; 2nd = Dennis Price; 2nd = John Cates; 2nd = Herb Ellerbock	Works; Koolymilka; Koolymilka; Koolymilka	11; 9; 9; 9	1st Robert "Butch" Leverington; 2nd Max Reid; 3rd Paul Said	Works; Works; Village	44; 32; 27
1974	1st Greg Whittle; 2nd Bob Boyle; 3rd John Shepherdson	Koolymilka; Works; Works	18; 17; 13	1st Greg Whittle; 2nd Bob Brandt; 3rd = R McEvoy; 3rd = Stan Grillett	Koolymilka; Village; Centrals; Works	56; 31; 28; 28
1975	1st Alan Trott; 2nd = Angelo Mele; 2nd = Kelly Hill	Koolymilka; Centrals; Mount Gunson	24; 14; 14	1st Greg Whittle; 2nd Simon Gee; 3rd Kelly Hill	Koolymilka; Koolymilka; Mount Gunson	61; 32; 28
1976	1st Angelo Mele; 2nd Alan Trott; 3rd Robert "Butch" Leverington	Centrals; Koolymilka; Works	28; 18; 14	1st Angelo Mele; 2nd T Wilson; 3rd B Hughes	Centrals; Centrals; Village	62; 48; 46
1977	1st Terry Morphett; 2nd Angelo Mele; 3rd Des Zobel	Centrals; Centrals; Woomera North	19; 14; 12	1st Des Zobel; 2nd Graeme Porter; 3rd Angelo Mele	Woomera North; Centrals; Centrals	89; 49; 43
1978	1st Des Zobel; 2nd Peter Ault; 3rd= Greg Reeks; 3rd= Ray Schliebs	Woomera North; Woomera North; Koolymilka; Woomera North	30; 24; 18; 18	1st John Shepherdson; 2nd Peter Ault; 3rd Phil Turner	Woomera North; Woomera North; Centrals	58; 44; 34
1979	1st Andrew Thompson; 2nd Dave Thomas; 3rd Phillip Waite	Woomera North; Woomera North; Koolymilka	33; 31; 20	1st Bryan Hughes; 2nd = Kelly Hill; 2nd = John Shepherdson; 3rd Barry Gerhardy	Woomera North; Mount Gunson; Woomera Norths; Mount Gunson	58; 48; 48; 46
1980	1st Kelly Hill; 2nd Ross Lambert; 3rd Barry Gerhardy	Mount Gunson; Woomera North; Mount Gunson	30; 26; 20	1st Kelly Hill	Mount Gunson	50
1981	1st Chris Foster; 2nd Kelly Hill; 3rd = John Hearne; 3rd = Dennis Cavanagh; 3rd = Ross Lambert	Koolymilka; Mount Gunson; Mount Gunson; Woomera North; Woomera North	17; 15; 11; 11; 11	1st Wally Broome	Koolymilka	76
1982	1st Dennis Cavanagh; 2nd Michael Hamilton	Woomera North; Woomera North	? ?	1st Wally Broome	Koolymilka	94
1983	1st Wally Broome; 2nd Darryl Middleton; 3rd = Stuart Wilson; 3rd = Malcolm McPhail	Koolymilka; Mount Gunson; Centrals; Koolymilka	18; 14; 10; 10	1st Wally Broome	Koolymilka	108
1984	1st = Steve Snow; 1st = Dave Davis*; 3rd Malcolm McPhail	Centrals; Centrals; Koolymilka	23; 23; 15	1st Mick Zuna	Village	76
1985	1st Robert Hearnes; 2nd Chris Griffiths; 3rd Roy Menner	Centrals; Koolymilka; Village	36; 23; 20	1st Wally Broome; 2nd Rob Hearnes; 3rd Glenn Davis	Koolymilka; Centrals; Centrals	89; 63; 34
	Woomera & Districts Football League					
1986	1st Stephen "Bunny" Dryburgh; 2nd Tim McLeod; 3rd Don Henderson	Roxby Districts; Roxby Districts; Woomera Centrals	20; 16; 13	1st Tim McLeod	Roxby Districts	?
1987	1st Don Henderson; 2nd Joe Gaby; 3rd = Peter Koenig; 3rd = M Pearce; 3rd = Tim McLeod	Woomera Centrals; Woomera Centrals; Koolymilka; Olympic Dam; Roxby Districts	13; 11; 8; 8; 8	1st Terry Dwyer	Roxby Districts	103
1988	1st Tim McLeod; 2nd = Paul Niekel; 2nd = Jeff Page	Roxby Districts; Roxby Districts; Woomera Centrals	10; 8; 8	Unknown		
1989	1st = Gary Bush; 1st = Stephen "Bunny" Dryburgh; 3rd Michael Foulds	Woomera Rockets; Roxby Districts; Roxby Districts	14; 14; 11	1st Paul Niekel	Roxby Districts	48
1990	1st Tony Richter; 2nd Tim McLeod; 3rd Kym Mitchell	Olympic Dam; Roxby Districts; Andamooka	14; 13; 12	1st Brett Hornhardt; 2nd Tony Richter; 3rd Gavin Zani	Olympic Dam; Olympic Dam; Andamooka	74; 49; 29
1991	1st Rodney Bain; 2nd Victor Buza; 3rd = Robert Greene; 3rd = R Lee	Olympic Dam; Andamooka; Roxby Districts; Olympic Dam	20; 13; 12; 12	1st Paul Niekel; 2nd Tony Richter; 3rd Gavin Zani	Roxby Districts; Olympic Dam; Andamooka	63; 49; 29
1992	1st = Kelly Hill; 1st = Stephen Daly; 3rd Peter Lindner	Olympic Dam; Olympic Dam; Olympic Dam	30; 30; 29	1st Brett Hornhardt; 2nd Tony Richter; 3rd John Caputo	Olympic Dam; Olympic Dam; Olympic Dam	74; 62; 48
1993	1st Peter Sheppard; 2nd Shaun McInerney	Andamooka; Roxby Districts	22 ?	1st Paul Niekel	Roxby Districts	51
1994	1st Victor Buza; 2nd Gary Dolling; 3rd Stephen Daly	Andamooka; Olympic Dam; Olympic Dam	26; 21; 18	1st Michael Wilson	Andamooka	64
1995	1st = Michael Glazbrook; 1st = Ashley Lodge; 3rd Graeme Fischer	Andamooka; Olympic Dam; Roxby Districts	28; 28; 24	1st Graeme Fischer	Roxby Districts	77
1996	1st Ashley Lodge; 2nd Mark Young; 3rd = Anthony Crettenden; 3rd = Tony Richter; 3rd = Kevin Harris	Olympic Dam; Roxby Districts; Andamooka; Olympic Dam; Roxby Districts	20; 16; 13; 13; 13	1st = Graeme Fisher; 1st = G Briggs	Roxby Districts; Andamooka	33; 33
1997	1st Adam Betterman; 2nd Kevin Harris; 3rd Tim Lange	Olympic Dam; Roxby Districts; Olympic Dam	28; 25; 20	1st Brett Hornhardt	Olympic Dam	49
1998	1st Adam Betterman; 2nd Simon Burden; 3rd Ronny McIvor	Olympic Dam; Roxby Districts; Andamooka	36; 28; 26	1st Paul Niekel	Roxby Districts	49
1999	1st Kevin Harris; 2nd Steve Symonds; 3rd Anthony Howie	Roxby Districts; Roxby Districts; Olympic Dam	34; 29; 24	Unknown		
2000	1st Nigel Shinnick; 2nd Kevin Harris; 3rd John McKenna	Andamooka; Roxby Districts; Olympic Dam	22; 20; 10	Unknown		
2001	1st Kevin Harris; 2nd Steve Symonds; 3rd Justin Grund	Roxby Districts; Roxby Districts; Olympic Dam	31; 28; 24	Unknown		
2002	1st Michael Uhlik; 2nd Austin Monfries; 3rd Scotty Morcom	Andamooka; Olympic Dam; Andamooka	37; 32; 29	Unknown		
2003	1st Anthony Howie; 2nd Kit Williams; 3rd Simon Riddle	Olympic Dam; Andamooka; Roxby Districts	36; 33; 25	1st Kit Williams	Andamooka	80
2004	1st = Paul Kemp; 1st = Steven Owens; 3rd = Anthony Howie; 3rd = Tony Desfontaines	Olympic Dam; Roxby Districts; Olympic Dam; Roxby Districts	16; 16; 15; 15	1st Mick Oldfield; 2nd Wade Feltus; 3rd Matt Daddow	Roxby Districts; Olympic Dam; Roxby Districts	44; 36; 34
2005	1st Ricky Prosser; 2nd Steven Owens; 3rd Austin Monfries	Roxby Districts; Roxby Districts; Olympic Dam	48; 25; 22	1st Ricky Prosser	Roxby Districts	?
2006	1st Tyrone Price; 2nd Lee Devlin; 3rd Leroy Boland	Hornridge; Roxby Districts; Coober Pedy	20; 16 ?	1st Kit Williams; 2nd R Briggs; 3rd Nigel Shinnick	Andamooka; Hornridge; Olympic Dam	60; 44; 39
2007	1st Michael Uhlik; 2nd = Daniel Sims; 2nd = Todd Williams	Andamooka; Roxby Districts; Coober Pedy	15; 9; 9	1st Kit Williams; 2nd = A Sullivan; 2nd = Leroy Boland	Andamooka; Olympic Dam; Coober Pedy	70; 27; 27
2008	1st Tyrone Price; 2nd Brett Chesson; 3rd Ryan Schell	Hornridge; Roxby Districts; Roxby Districts	13; 10; 9	1st Ricky Prosser; 2nd Todd Paull; 3rd Dale Summerton	Roxby Districts; Roxby Districts; Olympic Dam	48; 39; 36
2009	1st Daniel Rogers; 2nd = Scott Montgomerie; 2nd = Damien Smith	Olympic Dam; Olympic Dam; Hornridge	30; 22; 22	1st Scott Montgomerie; 2nd Nigel Shinnick; 3rd B Wray	Olympic Dam; Olympic Dam; Roxby Districts	34; 30; 22
2010	1st Jarrod Pyke; 2nd = Brad Cooper; 2nd = Toby Ripley	Roxby Districts; Hornridge; Andamooka	23 ? ?	1st Scott Montgomerie; 2nd Todd Paull; 3rd Justin Watson	Olympic Dam; Andamooka; Roxby Districts	38; 32; 24
	Far North Football League					
2011	1st Austin Monfries; 2nd Ben Woodall; 3rd Jamahl McKenzie	Andamooka; Olympic Dam; Andamooka	? ? ?	1st Todd Paull; 2nd Ricky Prosser; 3rd Bowde Kelly	Andamooka; Roxby Districts; Hornridge	31; 27; 24
2012	1st Daniel Pegler; 2nd Chris Jurek	Roxby Districts; Hornridge	23; 18	1st Dale Summerton; 2nd Joel Harman; 3rd Scott Montgomerie	Olympic Dam; Hornridge; Olympic Dam	59; 50; 27
2013	1st = Jared Greenbank; 1st = Aaron Hand; 3rd Michael Shaw	Roxby Districts; Andamooka; Olympic Dam	24; 24; 19	1st Scott Montgomerie; 2nd Joel Harman; 3rd Aaron Hand	Olympic Dam; Hornridge; Andamooka	67; 55; 49
2014	1st = Matthew Lynch; 1st = Tim Walsh; 3rd Justin Watson	Coober Pedy; Olympic Dam; Roxby Districts	21; 21; 18	1st Kelvin Henry; 2nd Joel Harman; 3rd Ricky Prosser	Coober Pedy; Hornridge; Roxby Districts	42; 37; 35
2015	1st James Telfer; 2nd Michael Shaw; 3rd Clayton Millard	Roxby Districts; Olympic Dam; East Roxby	26; 21; 20	1st Todd Paull; 2nd Sean McIvor; 3rd = Tony Mulders; 3rd = Joel Harman	East Roxby; Roxby Districts; East Roxby; Hornridge	35; 26; 22; 22
2016	1st Tyron Cribb; 2nd Rhett Simms	Roxby Districts; East Roxby	33; 30	1st Scott McIntyre; 2nd Ricky Prosser; 3rd Scott Montgomerie	East Roxby; Roxby Districts; Olympic Dam	82; 39; 32
2017	1st Jared Greenbank; 2nd Brodie Farnham	Roxby Districts; Hornridge	25; 23	1st Todd Blacksell; 2nd Ashley Baxter; 3rd Jared Greenbank	Roxby Districts; Hornridge; Roxby Districts	34; 22; 19
2018	1st Ashley Baxter; 2nd James Telfer	Hornridge; Roxby Districts	? ?	1st Joel Harman; 2nd = Ashley Baxter; 2nd = Michael McArthur	Hornridge; Hornridge; Hornridge	26; 17; 17
2019	1st Brendan Lehmann; 2nd Craig Hall	Hornridge; Roxby Districts	25; 20	1st Ashley Baxter; 2nd Michael Clark; 3rd = Luke Godfrey; 3rd = Ben Scott	Hornridge; Olympic Dam; Roxby Districts; Roxby Districts	31; 22; 16; 16
2020	No awards due to COVID-19					
2021	1st Jack Rigden; 2nd Waylon Johncock	Hornridge; Hornridge	? ?	1st Terry Clancy; 2nd Lachlan Munro; 3rd Christopher Oldfield	East Roxby; Hornridge; Hornridge	14; 13; 10
2022	1st Bradley Hoepner; 2nd Curtley Dadleh; 3rd Jeremy Sezun	Olympic Dam; Roxby Districts; Roxby Districts	33; 18; 17	1st Bryce Smith	Hornridge	30
2023	1st Jack Sires; 2nd Jack Rigden	Roxby Districts; Hornridge	17; 16	1st Andrew Miller; 2nd Anton Gerards; 3rd Lachlan Bates	Hornridge; Roxby Districts; Roxby Districts	35; 33; 22
2024	1st = Jack Rigden; 1st = Tyson Hornhardt; 1st = Liam Murphy; 2nd Billy Hodges; 3rd Jack Sires	Hornridge; Olympic Dam; Roxby Districts; Hornridge; Roxby Districts	19; 19; 19; 18; 15	1st Lachlan Munro; 2nd Lachlan Bates; 3rd Andrew Miller	Hornridge; Roxby Districts; Hornridge	44; 43; 32
2025	1st Josh Mewburn; 2nd Hakeem Johnson; 3rd Curtley Dadleh	Hornridge; Hornridge; Roxby Districts	22; 20; 17	1st Hakeem Johnson; 2nd Lochie Munro; 3rd Joshua Calyun	Hornridge; Hornridge; Hornridge	43; 26; 20
2026	1st Curtley Dadleh; 2nd Zach Noll; 3rd Benjamin Powell	Roxby Districts; Hornridge; Roxby Districts	33; 29; 20	1st Darren Shillabeer; 2nd Lochie Munro; 3rd= Bowde Kelly; 3rd= Mackenzie Cowley	Roxby Districts; Hornridge; Hornridge; Hornridge	28; 22; 21; 21

In 1999, as indicated by *, the Mail Medal was awarded retrospectively to Don Watson (1957), Warren Coops (1959), Alan Hancock (1969) and Dave Davis (1984).

== 1949 1st Year of Competition ==
WFL	Wins	Byes	Losses	Draws	For	Against	%	Pts	Final	Team	G	B	Pts	Team	G	B	Pts
Works & Housing									1st Semi								
1 L.C.P.S.									2nd Semi								
R.A.A.F.									Preliminary								
Contractors									Grand	1 L.C.P.S.	5	12	42	Works & Housing	5	11	41
L.R.W.E.R.																	
R.A.E.																	

Minor & Major rounds details not available. Teams for this year are those competing only. Not the final ladder. Works & Housing were undefeated until the Grand Final.

Best in Grand Final: Welsh (1 L.C.P.S.), Crack L (Works & Housing).

== 1950 Ladder ==
WFL	Wins	Byes	Losses	Draws	For	Against	%	Pts	Final	Team	G	B	Pts	Team	G	B	Pts
1 L.C.P.S.									1st Semi	RAAF			Def.	Contractors			
Works & Housing									2nd Semi	Works & Housing			Def	1 L.C.P.S.			
RAAF									Preliminary	RAAF			Def	1 L.C.P.S.			By 3 Pts
Contractors									Grand	Works & Housing	15	17	107	RAAF	2	5	17
Koolymilka																	
Village																	

Best in Grand Final: Unknown.

== 1951 Ladder ==
WFL	Wins	Byes	Losses	Draws	For	Against	%	Pts	Final	Team	G	B	Pts	Team	G	B	Pts
Contractors	8		2					16	1st Semi	Works & Housing	9	6	60	Village	6	16	52
1 L.C.P.S.	7		2	1				15	2nd Semi	Contractors	8	13	61	1 L.C.P.S.	7	10	52
Works & Housing	5		4	1				11	Preliminary	Works & Housing	6	9	45	1 L.C.P.S.	3	10	28
Village	5		5					10	Grand	Contractors	8	9	57	Works & Housing	7	10	52
RAAF	4		6					8									
Koolymilka	0		10					0									

Best in Grand Final: Unknown.

== 1952 Ladder ==
WFL	Wins	Byes	Losses	Draws	For	Against	%	Pts	Final	Team	G	B	Pts	Team	G	B	Pts
Village	13	0	2	0	821	405	66.97%	26	1st Semi	Koolymilka	17	20	122	RAAF	5	7	37
Works	11	0	4	0	882	565	60.95%	22	2nd Semi	Works	8	10	58	Village	7	8	50
Koolymilka	5	0	10	0	556	659	45.76%	10	Preliminary	Village	4	15	39	Koolymilka	3	8	26
RAAF	1	0	14	0	326	956	25.43%	2	Grand	Village	6	3	39	Works	1	7	13

Best in Grand Final: E M Liebelt (Village), B Flanegan (Works).

== 1953 Ladder ==
WFL	Wins	Byes	Losses	Draws	For	Against	%	Pts	Final	Team	G	B	Pts	Team	G	B	Pts
Koolymilka	10	0	2	0	637	481	56.98%	20	1st Semi	Works	10	6	66	RAAF	9	7	61
Village	7	0	5	0	579	489	54.21%	14	2nd Semi	Koolymilka	4	7	31	Village	3	4	22
Works	6	0	6	0	502	538	48.27%	12	Preliminary	Works	12	15	87	Village	6	7	43
RAAF	1	0	11	0	504	714	41.38%	2	Grand	Koolymilka	5	12	42	Works	5	2	32

Best in Grand Final: Neil Kerley (Koolymilka), Hale (Works).

Neil Kerley won Mail Medal with 29 votes; 9 firsts and 2 thirds from 12 matches.

== 1954 Ladder ==
WFL	Wins	Byes	Losses	Draws	For	Against	%	Pts	Final	Team	G	B	Pts	Team	G	B	Pts
Village	10	0	2	0	624	277	69.26%	20	1st Semi	Works	5	11	41	Koolymilka	5	1	31
RAAF	10	0	2	0	491	359	57.76%	20	2nd Semi	Village	8	5	53	RAAF	7	4	46
Works	3	0	9	0	367	520	41.38%	6	Preliminary	Works	3	12	30	RAAF	3	9	27
Koolymilka	1	0	11	0	255	581	30.50%	2	Grand	Village	6	8	44	Works	5	3	33

Best in Grand Final: Jimmy Neeson (Village), Peter Turnbull (Works).

== 1955 Ladder ==
WFL	Wins	Byes	Losses	Draws	For	Against	%	Pts	Final	Team	G	B	Pts	Team	G	B	Pts
Works	10	3	2	0	1028	351	74.55%	20	1st Semi	RAAF	7	9	51	Centrals	5	7	37
Village	9	3	3	0	888	358	71.27%	18	2nd Semi	Works	10	8	68	Village	5	7	37
Centrals	7	3	5	0	964	433	69.01%	14	Preliminary	RAAF	7	5	47	Village	4	5	29
RAAF	4	3	8	0	627	678	48.05%	8	Grand	Works	15	14	104	RAAF	10	5	65
Koolymilka	0	3	12	0	144	1412	9.25%	0									

Best in Grand Final: A Higgie (Works), Rankin (RAAF).

== 1956 Ladder ==
WFL	Wins	Byes	Losses	Draws	For	Against	%	Pts	Final	Team	G	B	Pts	Team	G	B	Pts
Village	9	3	3	0	988	560	63.82%	18	1st Semi	Works	7	10	52	RAAF	4	6	30
Centrals	8	3	4	0	694	467	59.78%	16	2nd Semi	Centrals	5	7	37	Village	3	6	24
Works	7	3	5	0	732	516	58.65%	14	Preliminary	Works	7	6	48	Village	6	10	46
RAAF	7	3	5	0	586	484	54.77%	14	Grand	Works	8	12	60	Centrals	1	4	10
Koolymilka	1	3	11	0	181	908	16.62%	2									

Best in Grand Final: Milton Maczkowiack (Works), Archie Ryan (Centrals).

== 1957 Ladder ==
WFL	Wins	Byes	Losses	Draws	For	Against	%	Pts	Final	Team	G	B	Pts	Team	G	B	Pts
Village	9	3	3	0	677	467	59.18%	18	1st Semi	RAAF	12	11	83	Centrals	9	11	65
Works	8	3	4	0	739	473	60.97%	16	2nd Semi	Village	11	7	73	Works	9	8	62
Centrals	7	3	5	0	679	665	50.52%	14	Preliminary	Works	13	20	98	RAAF	12	12	84
RAAF	6	3	6	0	680	698	49.35%	12	Grand	Village	6	15	51	Works	5	11	41
Koolymilka	0	3	12	0	526	998	34.51%	0									

Best in Grand Final: Bill Sheehan (Village), Mick McCarthy (Works).

== 1958 Ladder ==
WFL	Wins	Byes	Losses	Draws	For	Against	%	Pts	Final	Team	G	B	Pts	Team	G	B	Pts
Works	11	4	0	0	1153	364	76.01%	30	1st Semi	Centrals	11	13	79	RAAF	5	8	38
Village	7	4	4	0	776	479	61.83%	22	2nd Semi	Works	16	11	107	Village	7	7	49
Centrals	4	4	7	0	505	591	46.08%	16	Preliminary	Centrals	10	7	67	Village	8	14	62
RAAF	3	5	7	0	651	772	45.75%	16	Grand	Works	13	16	94	Centrals	9	9	63
Koolymilka	0	3	7	0	195	954	16.97%	6									

Best in Grand Final: Bob Ortmann (Works), Archie Ryan (Centrals).

== 1959 Ladder ==
WFL	Wins	Byes	Losses	Draws	For	Against	%	Pts	Final	Team	G	B	Pts	Team	G	B	Pts
Works	6	0	6	0	803	743	51.94%	12	1st Semi	Village	11	14	80	RAAF	6	11	53
Centrals	6	0	6	0	706	683	50.83%	12	2nd Semi	Centrals	9	14	68	Works	6	14	50
Village	6	0	6	0	715	710	50.18%	12	Preliminary	Village	12	11	83	Works	5	17	47
RAAF	6	0	6	0	635	703	47.46%	12	Grand	Village	16	15	111	Centrals	10	11	71

Best in Grand Final: John Heppell (Village), Don Lahey (Centrals).

== 1960 Ladder ==
WFL	Wins	Byes	Losses	Draws	For	Against	%	Pts	Final	Team	G	B	Pts	Team	G	B	Pts
Works	9	3	3	0	799	655	54.95%	24	1st Semi	Centrals	14	10	94	RAAF	3	10	28
Village	8	3	4	0	865	467	64.94%	22	2nd Semi	Works	17	19	121	Village	11	13	79
Centrals	6	3	6	0	785	771	50.45%	18	Preliminary	Centrals	10	8	68	Village	8	17	65
RAAF	5	3	7	0	670	702	48.83%	16	Grand	Centrals	18	14	122	Works	18	12	120
Koolymilka	2	3	10	0	488	927	34.49%	10									

Best in Grand Final: R Smith (Centrals), Bob Ortmann (Works).

== 1961 Ladder ==
WFL	Wins	Byes	Losses	Draws	For	Against	%	Pts	Final	Team	G	B	Pts	Team	G	B	Pts
Village	12	0	3	0	1218	742	62.14%	24	1st Semi	Centrals	10	9	69	RAAF	6	14	50
Works	9	0	6	0	1053	916	53.48%	18	2nd Semi	Village	11	15	81	Works	8	16	64
Centrals	6	0	9	0	939	919	50.54%	12	Preliminary	Works	14	19	103	Centrals	12	10	82
RAAF	3	0	12	0	641	1214	34.56%	6	Grand	Village	14	21	105	Works	6	9	45

Best in Grand Final: Bluey Waller (Village), Ron Weser (Works).

== 1962 Ladder ==
WFL	Wins	Byes	Losses	Draws	For	Against	%	Pts	Final	Team	G	B	Pts	Team	G	B	Pts
Works	12	3	0	0	1747	524	76.93%	30	1st Semi	Centrals	10	13	73	Village	8	16	64
RAAF	8	3	4	0	1151	777	59.70%	22	2nd Semi	Works	15	20	110	RAAF	5	8	38
Village	6	3	6	0	1201	662	64.47%	18	Preliminary	Centrals	13	12	90	RAAF	11	5	71
Centrals	4	3	8	0	818	1077	43.17%	14	Grand	Works	16	19	115	Centrals	7	8	50
Koolymilka	0	3	12	0	271	2138	11.25%	6									

Best in Grand Final: Neil Williams (Works), Ron Bradborn (Works).

== 1963 Ladder ==
WFL	Wins	Byes	Losses	Draws	For	Against	%	Pts	Final	Team	G	B	Pts	Team	G	B	Pts
Centrals	10	3	2	0	1212	597	67.00%	26	1st Semi	Works	18	13	121	RAAF	2	3	15
Village	9	3	3	0	1231	587	67.71%	24	2nd Semi	Centrals	15	8	98	Village	5	15	45
Works	8	3	4	0	1180	567	67.54%	22	Preliminary	Village	12	8	80	Works	10	16	76
RAAF	3	3	9	0	508	1102	31.55%	12	Grand	Village	14	12	96	Centrals	4	5	29
Koolymilka	0	3	12	0	319	1832	14.83%	6									

Best in Grand Final: Geoff Dyke (Village), Fred Jurgens (Centrals).

== 1964 Ladder ==
WFL	Wins	Byes	Losses	Draws	For	Against	%	Pts	Final	Team	G	B	Pts	Team	G	B	Pts
Village	9	4	2	0	1130	639	63.88%	26	1st Semi	Centrals	12	9	81	RAAF	10	12	72
Works	8	4	3	0	1111	642	63.38%	24	2nd Semi	Works	12	18	90	Village	11	4	70
Centrals	7	4	4	0	987	790	55.44%	22	Preliminary	Village	12	19	91	Centrals	2	5	17
RAAF	2	4	9	0	608	1081	36.00%	12	Grand	Works	17	18	120	Village	12	15	87
Koolymilka	1	3	9	0	412	1106	27.14%	10									

Best in Grand Final: Fred Wernert (Works).

== 1965 Ladder ==
WFL	Wins	Byes	Losses	Draws	For	Against	%	Pts	Final	Team	G	B	Pts	Team	G	B	Pts
Village	10	3	2	0	1314	471	73.61%	26	1st Semi	RAAF	6	5	41	Centrals	5	10	40
Works	8	3	4	0	928	811	53.36%	22	2nd Semi	Village	10	14	74	Works	7	9	51
Centrals	6	3	6	0	756	829	47.70%	18	Preliminary	Works	13	19	97	RAAF	2	12	24
RAAF	4	3	8	0	661	1031	39.07%	14	Grand	Village	11	15	81	Works	4	12	36
Koolymilka	2	3	10	0	575	1083	34.68%	10									

Best in Grand Final: Bill Hooker (Village), Ray Whitaker (Works).

== 1966 Ladder ==
WFL	Wins	Byes	Losses	Draws	For	Against	%	Pts	Final	Team	G	B	Pts	Team	G	B	Pts
Works	10	3	2	0	1284	627	67.19%	26	1st Semi	Koolymilka	15	10	100	RAAF	6	2	38
Village	10	3	2	0	1069	619	63.33%	26	2nd Semi	Works	12	15	87	Village	11	7	73
Koolymilka	4	3	8	0	621	1118	35.71%	14	Preliminary	Village	13	18	96	Koolymilka	9	13	67
RAAF	3	3	8	1	723	1037	41.08%	13	Grand	Works	18	13	121	Village	9	8	62
Centrals	2	3	9	1	760	1056	41.85%	11									

Best in Grand Final: Jurgen Wagnitz (Works), Ken Rau (Village).

== 1967 Ladder ==
WFL	Wins	Byes	Losses	Draws	For	Against	%	Pts	Final	Team	G	B	Pts	Team	G	B	Pts
Works	12	0	2	1	1383	818	62.84%	25	1st Semi	Centrals	11	12	78	Koolymilka	7	9	51
Village	11	0	3	1	1581	758	67.59%	23	2nd Semi	Village	10	18	78	Works	10	6	66
Centrals	6	0	9	0	1103	1284	46.21%	12	Preliminary	Centrals	8	12	60	Works	5	15	45
Koolymilka	0	0	15	0	547	1758	23.73%	0	Grand	Village	8	14	62	Centrals	8	13	61

Best in Grand Final: Brian Dempsey (Village).

== 1968 Ladder ==
WFL	Wins	Byes	Losses	Draws	For	Against	%	Pts	Final	Team	G	B	Pts	Team	G	B	Pts
Village	10	0	2	0	1155	660	63.64%	20	1st Semi	Centrals	12	22	94	Koolymilka	6	8	44
Works	8	0	4	0	1109	801	58.06%	16	2nd Semi	Works	11	12	78	Village	7	11	53
Centrals	6	0	6	0	1176	794	59.70%	12	Preliminary	Centrals	15	7	97	Village	10	8	68
Koolymilka	0	0	12	0	374	1559	19.35%	0	Grand	Works	13	14	92	Centrals	12	15	87

Best in Grand Final: Jurgen Wagnitz (Works), Neville Johnstone (Centrals).

== 1969 Ladder ==
WFL	Wins	Byes	Losses	Draws	For	Against	%	Pts	Final	Team	G	B	Pts	Team	G	B	Pts
Village	12	0	0	0	1668	431	79.46%	24	1st Semi	Works	15	17	107	Koolymilka	12	14	86
Centrals	8	0	4	0	1251	819	64.34%	16	2nd Semi	Village	14	15	99	Centrals	12	9	81
Works	3	0	9	0	730	1323	35.55%	6	Preliminary	Centrals	16	16	112	Works	14	13	97
Koolymilka	1	0	11	0	460	1536	23.04%	0	Grand	Village	17	14	116	Centrals	2	12	24

Best in Grand Final: Brian Dempsey (Village), Rex Quick (Centrals).

== 1970 Ladder ==
WFL	Wins	Byes	Losses	Draws	For	Against	%	Pts	Final	Team	G	B	Pts	Team	G	B	Pts
Centrals	12	0	0	0	1509	677	69.03%	24	1st Semi	Koolymilka	10	23	83	Works	9	8	62
Village	7	0	5	0	1492	941	61.32%	14	2nd Semi	Centrals	11	19	85	Village	12	11	83
Koolymilka	5	0	7	0	1229	1113	52.48%	10	Preliminary	Village	14	15	99	Koolymilka	8	16	64
Works	0	0	12	0	534	2033	20.80%	0	Grand	Village	11	11	77	Centrals	10	12	72

Best in Grand Final: Bob Brandt (Village), Rex Quick (Centrals).

== 1971 Ladder ==
WFL	Wins	Byes	Losses	Draws	For	Against	%	Pts	Final	Team	G	B	Pts	Team	G	B	Pts
Village	9	0	2	0	1167	904	56.35%	18	1st Semi	Works	13	12	90	Koolymilka	9	16	70
Centrals	6	0	5	0	1104	967	53.30%	12	2nd Semi	Village	14	23	107	Centrals	4	8	32
Koolymilka	5	0	6	0	1054	958	52.35%	10	Preliminary	Works	10	14	74	Centrals	8	7	55
Works	2	0	9	0	753	1247	37.65%	4	Grand	Village	14	11	95	Works	11	7	73

Best in Grand Final: Gary Hele (Village), Dave Owen (Works).

== 1972 Ladder ==
WFL	Wins	Byes	Losses	Draws	For	Against	%	Pts	Final	Team	G	B	Pts	Team	G	B	Pts
Village	9	0	3	0				18	1st Semi	Centrals	18	9	117	Works	15	12	102
Koolymilka	8	0	4	0				16	2nd Semi	Village	10	11	71	Koolymilka	11	5	71
Centrals	5	0	7	0				10	Replay	Village	15	14	104	Koolymilka	14	12	96
Works	2	0	10	0				4	Preliminary	Koolymilka	16	9	105	Centrals	8	15	63
									Grand	Koolymilka	10	13	73	Village	9	8	62

Best in Grand Final: Mick Hancock (Koolymilka), Bob Brandt (Village).

== 1973 Ladder ==
WFL	Wins	Byes	Losses	Draws	For	Against	%	Pts	Final	Team	G	B	Pts	Team	G	B	Pts
Koolymilka	11	0	1	0	1363	820	62.44%	22	1st Semi	Centrals	23	19	157	Village	14	21	105
Works	6	0	6	0	1150	1077	51.64%	12	2nd Semi	Koolymilka	19	14	128	Works	16	14	110
Village	4	0	8	0	871	1299	40.14%	8	Preliminary	Works	10	18	78	Centrals	10	11	71
Centrals	3	0	9	0	1013	1203	45.71%	6	Grand	Koolymilka	18	13	121	Works	10	13	73

Best in Grand Final: Paul Sargeant (Koolymilka), Gavin Hitch (Works).

== 1974 Ladder ==
WFL	Wins	Byes	Losses	Draws	For	Against	%	Pts	Final	Team	G	B	Pts	Team	G	B	Pts
Koolymilka	10	0	4	0	1263	1029	55.10%	20	1st Semi	Village	13	12	90	Centrals	12	14	86
Works	9	0	5	0	1181	987	54.47%	18	2nd Semi	Works	16	19	115	Koolymilka	13	14	92
Centrals	5	0	9	0	970	1171	45.31%	10	Preliminary	Koolymilka	19	14	128	Village	12	17	89
Village	4	0	10	0	985	1212	44.83%	8	Grand	Works	13	16	94	Koolymilka	8	12	60

Best in Grand Final: Garry Thomas (Works), Chiesa (Koolymilka).

== 1975 Ladder ==
WFL	Wins	Byes	Losses	Draws	For	Against	%	Pts	Final	Team	G	B	Pts	Team	G	B	Pts
Koolymilka	10	3	1	0	1293	644	66.76%	20	1st Semi	Mt. Gunson	12	22	94	Works	12	10	82
Centrals	8	3	3	0	1051	677	60.83%	16	2nd Semi	Centrals	15	9	99	Koolymilka	11	19	85
Works	5	3	6	0	949	1240	43.36%	10	Preliminary	Koolymilka	25	15	165	Mt. Gunson	11	20	86
Mt. Gunson	2	2	10	0	879	1333	39.74%	4	Grand	Koolymilka	10	22	82	Centrals	10	7	67
Village	2	3	9	0	775	1449	34.85%	4									

Best in Grand Final: Rick Daly (Koolymilka), Peter Tattersall (Centrals).

== 1976 Ladder ==
WFL	Wins	Byes	Losses	Draws	For	Against	%	Pts	Final	Team	G	B	Pts	Team	G	B	Pts
Centrals	12	3	0	0	1970	590	76.95%	24	1st Semi	Mt. Gunson	21	21	147	Koolymilka	13	7	85
Works	7	3	5	0	1305	1320	49.71%	14	2nd Semi	Centrals	34	27	231	Works	2	8	20
Mt. Gunson	4	3	8	0	1139	1600	41.58%	8	Preliminary	Mt.Gunson			Win	Works			Forfeit
Koolymilka	4	3	8	0	883	1475	37.45%	8	Grand	Centrals	19	22	136	Mt. Gunson	4	11	35
Village	3	3	9	0	1110	1422	43.84%	6									

Best in Grand Final: Angelo Mele (Centrals), R Ireland (Mt. Gunson).

== 1977 Ladder ==
WFL	Wins	Byes	Losses	Draws	For	Against	%	Pts	Final	Team	G	B	Pts	Team	G	B	Pts
Centrals	11	0	1	0			78.00%	22	1st Semi	Mt. Gunson	19	20	134	Koolymilka	4	8	32
Norths	8	0	4	0			74.00%	16	2nd Semi	Norths	17	11	113	Centrals	9	24	78
Mt. Gunson	3	0	9	0			35.00%	8	Preliminary	Centrals	18	13	121	Mt.Gunson	9	10	64
Koolymilka	0	0	12	0			15.00%	8	Grand	Norths	14	8	92	Centrals	10	18	78

Best in Grand Final: Gavin Hitch (Norths), Cox (Centrals).

== 1978 Ladder ==
WFL	Wins	Byes	Losses	Draws	For	Against	%	Pts	Final	Team	G	B	Pts	Team	G	B	Pts
Norths	11	0	1	0			76.40%	22	1st Semi	Koolymilka	19	30	144	Mt. Gunson	10	4	64
Centrals	8	0	4	0			67.80%	16	2nd Semi	Norths	15	19	109	Centrals	8	12	60
Mt. Gunson	3	0	9	0			28.00%	6	Preliminary	Centrals	17	15	117	Koolymilka	5	13	43
Koolymilka	2	0	10	0			28.20%	4	Grand	Norths	17	21	123	Centrals	11	12	78

Best in Grand Final: Peter Ault (Norths), Phil Ward (Centrals).

== 1979 Ladder ==
WFL	Wins	Byes	Losses	Draws	For	Against	%	Pts	Final	Team	G	B	Pts	Team	G	B	Pts
Norths	10	3	2	0	1651	848	66.41%	22	1st Semi	Koolymilka	7	18	60	Centrals	6	18	54
Mt. Gunson	8	3	4	0	1446	844	63.14%	16	2nd Semi	Norths	21	18	144	Mt. Gunson	12	13	85
Koolymilka	8	3	4	0	1179	1031	53.15%	16	Preliminary	Mt. Gunson	31	24	210	Koolymilka	13	10	88
Centrals	4	3	8	0	969	1497	39.29%	8	Grand	Norths	26	11	167	Mt. Gunson	21	22	148
Works	0	3	12	0	563	1844	28.20%	0									

Best in Grand Final: John Shepherdson (Norths), Kelly Hill (Mt. Gunson).

== 1980 Ladder ==
WFL	Wins	Byes	Losses	Draws	For	Against	%	Pts	Final	Team	G	B	Pts	Team	G	B	Pts
Centrals	8	0	3	1	1029	1096	48.42%	17	1st Semi	Mt. Gunson	11	30	96	Norths	12	18	90
Koolymilka	6	0	5	1	1037	1099	48.55%	13	2nd Semi	Centrals	21	11	137	Koolymilka	20	11	131
Mt. Gunson	5	0	7	0	1241	1136	52.21%	10	Preliminary	Koolymilka	20	15	135	Mt. Gunson	12	14	86
Norths	4	0	8	0	1055	1161	46.40%	8	Grand	Centrals	20	15	135	Koolymilka	14	9	93

Best in Grand Final: Jim Richards (Centrals), Chris Foster (Koolymilka).

== 1981 Ladder ==
WFL	Wins	Byes	Losses	Draws	For	Against	%	Pts	Final	Team	G	B	Pts	Team	G	B	Pts
Mt. Gunson	9	0	3	0				18	1st Semi	Koolymilka			Def	Centrals			
Norths	9	0	3	0				18	2nd Semi	Mt. Gunson			Def	Norths			
Koolymilka	4	0	8	0				8	Preliminary	Norths			Def	Koolymilka			
Centrals	2	0	10	0				4	Grand	Mt. Gunson	25	13	163	Norths	18	12	120

Best in Grand Final: John Hearne (Mt. Gunson), John Shepherdson (Norths).

== 1982 Ladder ==
WFL	Wins	Byes	Losses	Draws	For	Against	%	Pts	Final	Team	G	B	Pts	Team	G	B	Pts
Mt. Gunson	8	0	2	0				16									
Norths	7	0	3	0				14									
Centrals	5	0	5	0				10	Qualifying	Norths			Def	Centrals			By 4 goals
Koolymilka	0	0	10	0				0	Grand	Mt. Gunson	27	19	181	Norths	13	12	90

Best in Grand Final: Kelly Hill (Mt. Gunson), Jeff Simpson (Norths).

== 1983 Ladder ==
WFL	Wins	Byes	Losses	Draws	For	Against	%	Pts	Final	Team	G	B	Pts	Team	G	B	Pts
Koolymilka	10	0	2	0	1475	901	62.08%	20									
Norths	7	0	5	0	1162	1209	49.00%	14									
Centrals	4	0	8	0	1217	1323	47.918%	8	Qualifying	Norths	21	24	150	Centrals	6	8	44
Mt. Gunson	3	0	9	0	848	1381	38.04%	6	Grand	Koolymilka	15	17	107	Norths	11	12	78

Best in Grand Final: All played well (Koolymilka), Mick Weber (Norths).

== 1984 Ladder ==
WFL	Wins	Byes	Losses	Draws	For	Against	%	Pts	Final	Team	G	B	Pts	Team	G	B	Pts
Koolymilka	6	4	2	0	1193	867	57.91%	12									
Centrals	6	4	2	0	995	747	57.12%	12	Qualifying	Centrals	13	20	98	Village	11	15	81
Village	0	4	8	0	670	1020	39.65%	0	Grand	Centrals	23	6	144	Koolymilka	17	9	111

Best in Grand Final: John Shepherdson (Centrals), Peter Koenig (Koolymilka).

== 1985 Ladder ==
WFL	Wins	Byes	Losses	Draws	For	Against	%	Pts	Final	Team	G	B	Pts	Team	G	B	Pts
Koolymilka	11	0	1	0				22									
Centrals	8	0	4	0				16									
Village	4	0	8	0				8	Qualifying	Village	13	8	86	Centrals	10	6	66
JDSCS Warriors	1	0	11	0				2	Grand	Koolymilka	13	14	92	Village	13	12	90

Best in Grand Final: ? (Koolymilka), ? (Village).

== 1986 Ladder ==
WFL	Wins	Byes	Losses	Draws	For	Against	%	Pts	Final	Team	G	B	Pts	Team	G	B	Pts
Roxby Districts	15	0	0	0				30									
Centrals	10	0	5	0				20									
Koolymilka	4	0	11	0				8	Qualifying	Centrals			Def	Koolymilka			
JDSCS Warriors	1	0	14	0				2	Grand	Roxby Districts	19	13	127	Centrals	11	14	80

Best in Grand Final: Stephen Dryburgh (Roxby Districts), Roy Menner (Centrals).

== 1987 Ladder ==
WFL	Wins	Byes	Losses	Cancelled	For	Against	%	Pts	Final	Team	G	B	Pts	Team	G	B	Pts
Roxby Districts	9	3	2	1	1536	411	78.89%	18	1st Semi	Centrals	43	35	293	JDSCS	0	1	1
Olympic Dam	8	3	3	2	1652	458	78.29%	16	2nd Semi	Roxby Districts	14	10	94	Olympic Dam	9	14	68
Centrals	8	3	3	0	1622	829	66.18%	16	Preliminary	Olympic Dam	18	19	127	Centrals	11	9	75
JDSCS Warriors	0	3	11	1	104	2416	4.13%	-2*	Grand	Olympic Dam	15	12	102	Roxby Districts	7	13	55
Koolymilka	3	3	9	0	843	1643	33.91%	-4*									

Koolymilka and JDSCS Warriors deducted points for playing unregistered players*.

Two games were canceled between Olympic Dam -v- JDSCS and Olympic Dam -v- Roxby Districts.

Best in Grand Final: ? (Olympic Dam), ? (Roxby Districts).

== 1988 Ladder ==
WFL	Wins	Byes	Losses	Draws	For	Against	%	Pts	Final	Team	G	B	Pts	Team	G	B	Pts
Roxby Districts	9	4	0	0	1072	233	82.15%	18									
Centrals	4	4	5	0	536	948	36.15%	8									
Olympic Dam	0	5	8	0	340	767	30.71%	0	Grand	Roxby Districts	26	16	172	Centrals	8	12	60

Best in Grand Final: ? (Roxby Districts), Bob Evans (Centrals).

== 1989 Ladder ==
WFL	Wins	Byes	Losses	Draws	For	Against	%	Pts	Final	Team	G	B	Pts	Team	G	B	Pts
Roxby Districts	0	0	0	0					1st Semi	Andamooka			Def	Olympic Dam			
Woomera Rockets	0	0	0	0					2nd Semi	Roxby Districts			Def	Woomera Rockets			
Andamooka	0	0	0	0					Preliminary	Andamooka	25	22	172	Woomera Rockets	4	10	34
Olympic Dam	0	0	0	0					Grand	Roxby Districts	13	17	95	Andamooka	12	12	84

Best in Grand Final: ? (Roxby Districts), ? (Andamooka).

== 1990 Ladder ==
WFL	Wins	Byes	Losses	Draws	For	Against	%	Pts	Final	Team	G	B	Pts	Team	G	B	Pts
Andamooka	0	0	0	0					1st Semi								
Roxby Districts	0	0	0	0					2nd Semi								
Olympic Dam	0	0	0	0					Preliminary								
Woomera Rockets	0	0	0	0					Grand	Andamooka	29	19	193	Roxby Districts	11	10	76

Minor & Major rounds details not available. Andamooka undefeated.

Best in Grand Final: ? (Andamooka), ? (Roxby Districts).

== 1991 Ladder ==
WFL	Wins	Byes	Losses	Draws	For	Against	%	Pts	Final	Team	G	B	Pts	Team	G	B	Pts
Roxby Districts	12	0	3	0	1903	870	68.62%	24									
Andamooka	10	0	5	0	1550	973	61.43%	20									
Olympic Dam	8	0	7	0	1304	1242	51.21%	16	Qualifying	Andamooka	21	15	141	Olympic Dam	12	10	82
Woomera Rockets	0	0	15	0	565	2247	20.09%	0	Grand	Roxby Districts	15	7	97	Andamooka	7	15	57

Best in Grand Final: D Pridham (Roxby Districts), ? (Andamooka).

== 1992 Ladder ==
WFL	Wins	Byes	Losses	Draws	For	Against	%	Pts	Final	Team	G	B	Pts	Team	G	B	Pts
Olympic Dam	15	0	0	0	2309	633	78.48%	30	1st Semi	Andamooka	16	13	109	Leigh Creek	12	17	89
Roxby Districts	9	0	5	0	1306	915	58.98%	20*	2nd Semi	Olympic Dam	28	14	182	Roxby Districts	7	5	47
Andamooka	7	0	8	0	1136	1256	47.49%	14	Preliminary	Andamooka	12	17	89	Roxby Districts	4	17	41
Leigh Creek	6	0	9	0	1121	1278	46.72%	12	Grand	Olympic Dam	16	17	113	Andamooka	11	12	78
Woomera Rockets	4	0	11	0	711	1650	30.11%	8									
Bungala	3	0	11	0	886	1747	33.65%	6*									

Bungala forfeited one game against Roxby Districts due to a misunderstanding*.

Best in Grand Final: ? (Olympic Dam), ? (Andamooka).

== 1993 Ladder ==
WFL	Wins	Byes	Losses	Draws	For	Against	%	Pts	Final	Team	G	B	Pts	Team	G	B	Pts
Olympic Dam	0	0	0	0					1st Semi								
Bungala	0	0	0	0					2nd Semi								
Roxby Districts	0	0	0	0					Preliminary								
Andamooka	0	0	0	0					Grand	Olympic Dam	24	17	161	Bungala	13	5	83
Leigh Creek	0	0	0	0													

Minor & Major rounds details not available. Leigh Creek did not complete the full season. Olympic Dam lost one game for the season.

Best in Grand Final: ? (Olympic Dam), ? (Bungala).

== 1994 Ladder ==
WFL	Wins	Byes	Losses	Draws	For	Against	%	Pts	Final	Team	G	B	Pts	Team	G	B	Pts
Olympic Dam	0	0	0	0					1st Semi								
Andamooka	0	0	0	0					2nd Semi								
Roxby Districts	0	0	0	0					Preliminary								
Bungala	0	0	0	0					Grand	Olympic Dam	18	8	116	Andamooka	11	13	79
Coober Pedy	0	0	0	0													
Umeewarra	0	0	0	0				-									

Minor & Major rounds details not available.

Best in Grand Final: ? (Olympic Dam), ? (Andamooka).

== 1995 Ladder ==
WFL	Wins	Byes	Losses	Draws	For	Against	%	Pts	Final	Team	G	B	Pts	Team	G	B	Pts
Andamooka	0	0	0	0					1st Semi	Coober Pedy	22	11	143	Olympic Dam	11	8	74
Roxby Districts	0	0	0	0					2nd Semi	Andamooka	12	16	88	Roxby Districts	12	7	79
Coober Pedy	0	0	0	0					Preliminary	Roxby Districts			Def	Coober Pedy			
Olympic Dam	0	0	0	0					Grand	Andamooka	12	9	81	Roxby Districts	7	9	51
Bungala	0	0	0	0													
Umeewarra	0	0	0	0													

Best in Grand Final: Stuart Nunn (Andamooka), ? (Roxby Districts).

== 1996 Ladder ==
WFL	Wins	Byes	Losses	Draws	For	Against	%	Pts	Final	Team	G	B	Pts	Team	G	B	Pts
Olympic Dam	0	0	0	0					1st Semi								
Roxby Districts	0	0	0	0					2nd Semi								
Andamooka	0	0	0	0					Preliminary								
Umeewarra	0	0	0	0					Grand	Olympic Dam	12	8	80	Roxby Districts	9	18	72

Minor & Major rounds details not available. Umeewarra last game 07/07/1996. Olympic Dam undefeated.

Best in Grand Final: ? (Olympic Dam), ? (Roxby Districts).

== 1997 Ladder ==
WFL	Wins	Byes	Losses	Draws	For	Against	%	Pts	Final	Team	G	B	Pts	Team	G	B	Pts
Olympic Dam	0	0	0	0					1st Semi								
Andamooka	0	0	0	0					2nd Semi								
Roxby Districts	0	0	0	0					Preliminary								
Hornridge	0	0	0	0					Grand	Olympic Dam	20	14	134	Andamooka	8	7	55

Minor & Major rounds details not available. Hornridge 1st season. Olympic Dam undefeated.

Best in Grand Final: ? (Olympic Dam), ? (Andamooka).

== 1998 Ladder ==
WFL	Wins	Byes	Losses	Draws	For	Against	%	Pts	Final	Team	G	B	Pts	Team	G	B	Pts
Andamooka	0	0	0	0					1st Semi								
Olympic Dam	0	0	0	0					2nd Semi								
Roxby Districts	0	0	0	0					Preliminary								
Hornridge	0	0	0	0					Grand	Olympic Dam	12	9	81	Roxby Districts	12	7	79

Minor & Major rounds details not available. Andamooka Minor Premiers.

Best in Grand Final: ? (Olympic Dam), ? (Roxby Districts).

== 1999 Ladder ==
WFL	Wins	Byes	Losses	Draws	For	Against	%	Pts	Final	Team	G	B	Pts	Team	G	B	Pts
Roxby Districts	0	0	0	0					1st Semi								
Hornridge	0	0	0	0					2nd Semi								
Olympic Dam	0	0	0	0					Preliminary								
Andamooka	0	0	0	0					Grand	Roxby Districts	13	15	93	Hornridge	4	2	26

Minor & Major rounds details not available. Roxby Districts Minor Premiers.

Best in Grand Final: ? (Roxby Districts), ? (Hornridge).

== 2000 Ladder ==
WFL	Wins	Byes	Losses	Draws	For	Against	%	Pts	Final	Team	G	B	Pts	Team	G	B	Pts
Roxby Districts	9	0	2	0	958	460	67.56	18	1st Semi	Andamooka			Def	Hornridge			
Olympic Dam	5	0	5	1	640	764	45.59	11	2nd Semi	Roxby Districts	22	17	149	Olympic Dam	6	7	43
Andamooka	4	0	6	1	696	738	48.54	9	Preliminary	Andamooka	11	6	72	Olympic Dam	8	9	57
Hornridge	3	0	8	0	532	864	38.11	6	Grand	Roxby Districts	16	19	115	Andamooka	8	7	55

Best in Grand Final: ? (Roxby Districts), ? (Andamooka).

== 2001 Ladder ==
WFL	Wins	Byes	Losses	Draws	For	Against	%	Pts	Final	Team	G	B	Pts	Team	G	B	Pts
Roxby Districts	0	0	0	0					1st Semi	Hornridge			Def	Andamooka			
Olympic Dam	0	0	0	0					2nd Semi	Roxby Districts			Def	Olympic Dam			
Hornridge	0	0	0	0					Preliminary	Hornridge	9	7	61	Olympic Dam	6	9	45
Andamooka	0	0	0	0					Grand	Hornridge	7	4	46	Roxby Districts	5	5	35

Some Minor & Major rounds details are not available.

Best in Grand Final: ? (Hornridge), ? (Roxby Districts).

== 2002 Ladder ==
WFL	Wins	Byes	Losses	Draws	For	Against	%	Pts	Final	Team	G	B	Pts	Team	G	B	Pts
Andamooka	11	0	4	0	1860	739	71.57	22									
Olympic Dam	10	0	5	0	1231	1277	49.08	20									
Hornridge	8	0	7	0	1391	945	59.54	16	Qualifying	Hornridge			Def	Olympic Dam			
Roxby Districts	1	0	14	0	487	2008	19.52	2	Grand	Hornridge	11	7	73	Andamooka	9	8	62

Best in Grand Final: ? (Hornridge), ? (Andamooka).

== 2003 Ladder ==
WFL	Wins	Byes	Losses	Draws	For	Against	%	Pts	Final	Team	G	B	Pts	Team	G	B	Pts
Andamooka	12	0	2	0	1678	710	70.27	24									
Olympic Dam	10	0	4	0	1284	1106	53.72	20									
Roxby Districts	3	0	11	0	883	1286	40.71	6	Qualifying	Olympic Dam	13	11	89	Roxby Districts	6	8	44
Hornridge	3	0	11	0	804	1547	34.20	6	Grand	Andamooka	15	12	102	Olympic Dam	7	6	48

Best in Grand Final: Jae Perkins (Andamooka), ? (Olympic Dam).

== 2004 Ladder ==
WFL	Wins	Byes	Losses	Draws	For	Against	%	Pts	Final	Team	G	B	Pts	Team	G	B	Pts
Olympic Dam	12	0	3	0	1636	766	68.11%	24									
Roxby Districts	11	0	4	0	1685	930	64.44%	22									
Andamooka	7	0	8	0	1061	1127	48.49%	14	Qualifying	Roxby Districts	19	11	125	Andamooka	9	5	59
Hornridge	0	0	15	0	524	2087	18.60%	0	Grand	Olympic Dam	14	5	89	Roxby Districts	11	11	77

Best in Grand Final: ? (Olympic Dam), ? (Roxby Districts).

== 2005 Ladder ==
WFL	Wins	Byes	Losses	Draws	For	Against	%	Pts	Final	Team	G	B	Pts	Team	G	B	Pts
Olympic Dam	11	3	1	0	1566	513	75.32	22	1st Semi	Hornridge	7	6	48	Andamooka	5	8	38
Roxby Districts	10	3	2	0	1692	682	71.27	20	2nd Semi	Olympic Dam	11	6	72	Roxby Districts	10	11	71
Hornridge	5	3	7	0	1157	702	36.93	10	Preliminary	Roxby Districts	31	27	213	Hornridge	3	1	19
Andamooka	4	3	8	0	733	1157	38.78	8	Grand	Olympic Dam	12	8	80	Roxby Districts	10	6	66
Coober Pedy	0	3	11	0	541	1623	25.00	0									

Coober Pedy forfeited one game against Hornridge.

Best in Grand Final: Paul Kemp (Olympic Dam), Ricky Prosser (Roxby Districts).

== 2006 Ladder ==
Far North FL	Wins	Byes	Losses	Draws	For	Against	%	Pts	Final	Team	G	B	Pts	Team	G	B	Pts
Olympic Dam	9	3	3	0	1322	857	60.67%	18	1st Semi	Roxby Districts	12	16	88	Andamooka	6	9	45
Hornridge	8	3	4	0	1006	1116	47.41%	16	2nd Semi	Olympic Dam	15	15	105	Hornridge	8	7	55
Andamooka	6	3	6	0	961	1047	47.86%	12	Preliminary	Roxby Districts	12	10	82	Hornridge	8	7	55
Roxby Districts	5	3	7	0	881	1146	43.46%	10	Grand	Olympic Dam	15	9	99	Roxby Districts	4	2	26
Coober Pedy	2	3	10	0	1169	1173	49.91%	4									

Best in Grand Final: N Burton (Olympic Dam), Ricky Prosser (Roxby Districts).

== 2007 Ladder ==
Far North FL	Wins	Byes	Losses	Draws	For	Against	%	Pts	Final	Team	G	B	Pts	Team	G	B	Pts
Olympic Dam	9	3	3	0	1290	633	67.08%	18	1st Semi	Roxby Districts	23	13	152	Coober Pedy	10	7	67
Andamooka	7	3	5	0	999	820	54.92%	14	2nd Semi	Andamooka	9	8	62	Olympic Dam	2	5	17
Coober Pedy	7	3	5	0	1105	1036	51.61%	14	Preliminary	Olympic Dam	17	8	110	Roxby Districts	14	7	91
Roxby Districts	6	3	6	0	1130	866	56.61%	12	Grand	Andamooka	15	5	95	Olympic Dam	10	9	69
Hornridge	1	3	11	0	512	1681	23.35%	2									

Best in Grand Final: Michael Uhlik (Andamooka), A Petty (Olympic Dam).

== 2008 Ladder ==
Far North FL	Wins	Byes	Losses	Draws	For	Against	%	Pts	Final	Team	G	B	Pts	Team	G	B	Pts
Roxby Districts	10	3	2	0	1319	589	69.13%	20	1st Semi	Hornridge	8	7	55	Andamooka	7	11	53
Olympic Dam	9	3	3	0	1309	560	70.04%	18	2nd Semi	Olympic Dam	19	6	120	Roxby Districts	4	7	31
Andamooka	6	3	6	0	765	869	46.82%	12	Preliminary	Roxby Districts	10	8	68	Hornridge	6	5	41
Hornridge	3	3	9	0	847	1006	45.71%	6	Grand	Olympic Dam	11	3	69	Roxby Districts	9	7	61
Coober Pedy	2	3	10	0	478	1694	22.01%	4									

Best in Grand Final: Dion McKenna (Olympic Dam), Tristan Baldy (Roxby Districts).

== 2009 Ladder ==
Far North FL	Wins	Byes	Losses	Draws	For	Against	%	Pts	Final	Team	G	B	Pts	Team	G	B	Pts
Olympic Dam	11	3	1	0	1692	451	78.95%	22	1st Semi	Roxby Districts	18	11	119	Coober Pedy	10	8	68
Hornridge	8	3	4	0	1207	606	66.57%	16	2nd Semi	Olympic Dam	14	10	94	Hornridge	9	10	64
Roxby Districts	8	3	4	0	1150	765	60.05%	16	Preliminary	Roxby Districts	9	10	64	Hornridge	8	9	57
Coober Pedy	2	3	10	0	625	1617	27.88%	4	Grand	Olympic Dam	10	19	79	Roxby Districts	10	7	67
Coober Pedy	1	3	11	0	428	1655	20.55%	2									

Best in Grand Final: Tyson Hornhardt (Olympic Dam), D McGrath (Roxby Districts).

== 2010 Ladder ==
Far North FL	Wins	Byes	Losses	Draws	For	Against	%	Pts	Final	Team	G	B	Pts	Team	G	B	Pts
Olympic Dam	11	3	1	0	991	613	61.78%	22	1st Semi	Andamooka	13	10	88	Coober Pedy	11	10	76
Roxby Districts	9	3	3	0	1083	530	67.14%	18	2nd Semi	Roxby Districts	14	13	97	Olympic Dam	3	8	26
Coober Pedy	5	3	7	0	723	1063	40.48%	10	Preliminary	Olympic Dam	9	11	65	Andamooka	8	12	60
Andamooka	3	3	9	0	743	931	44.38%	6	Grand	Roxby Districts	13	7	85	Olympic Dam	2	6	18
Hornridge	2	3	10	0	652	1055	38.20%	4									

Best in Grand Final: Ricky Prosser (Roxby Districts), C Taylour (Olympic Dam).

== 2011 Ladder ==
Far North FL	Wins	Byes	Losses	Draws	For	Against	%	Pts	Final	Team	G	B	Pts	Team	G	B	Pts
Olympic Dam	11	3	1	0	1286	568	69.36%	22	1st Semi	Hornridge	12	14	86	Roxby Districts	4	6	30
Andamooka	6	3	6	0	902	717	55.71%	12	2nd Semi	Olympic Dam	14	16	100	Andamooka	9	4	58
Hornridge	6	3	6	0	1000	826	54.76%	12	Preliminary	Andamooka	11	5	71	Hornridge	8	15	63
Roxby Districts	5	3	7	0	653	839	43.77%	10	Grand	Olympic Dam	16	16	112	Andamooka	6	8	44
Coober Pedy	2	3	10	0	693	1584	30.43%	4									

Best in Grand Final: Rian Hornhardt (Olympic Dam), A Schiller (Andamooka).

== 2012 Ladder ==
Far North FL	Wins	Byes	Losses	Draws	For	Against	%	Pts	Final	Team	G	B	Pts	Team	G	B	Pts
Roxby Districts	11	3	1	0	1306	494	72.56%	22	1st Semi	Olympic Dam	18	12	120	Andamooka	5	3	33
Hornridge	8	3	4	0	1275	733	63.50%	16	2nd Semi	Roxby Districts	14	12	96	Hornridge	10	12	72
Olympic Dam	7	3	5	0	1382	699	66.41%	14	Preliminary	Hornridge	13	12	90	Olympic Dam	6	7	43
Andamooka	3	3	9	0	740	1262	36.96%	6	Grand	Hornridge	11	11	77	Roxby Districts	8	6	54
Coober Pedy	1	3	11	0	494	2009	19.74%	2									

Best in Grand Final: Trent Grosser (Hornridge), J Kamanski (Roxby Districts).

== 2013 Ladder ==
Far North FL	Wins	Byes	Losses	Draws	For	Against	%	Pts	Final	Team	G	B	Pts	Team	G	B	Pts
Olympic Dam	10	3	2	0	1472	719	67.18%	20	1st Semi	Hornridge	16	18	114	Andamooka	4	7	31
Roxby Districts	9	3	3	0	1392	710	66.22%	18	2nd Semi	Roxby Districts	20	10	130	Olympic Dam	10	12	72
Hornridge	7	3	5	0	1194	886	57.40%	14	Preliminary	Hornridge	11	8	74	Olympic Dam	3	17	35
Andamooka	4	3	8	0	884	1254	41.35%	8	Grand	Roxby Districts	17	14	116	Hornridge	7	3	45
Coober Pedy	0	3	12	0	515	1888	21.43%	0									

Best in Grand Final: Jared Greenbank (Roxby Districts), S Schwartz (Hornridge).

== 2014 Ladder ==
Far North FL	Wins	Byes	Losses	Draws	For	Against	%	Pts	Final	Team	G	B	Pts	Team	G	B	Pts
Roxby Districts	11	3	1	0	1739	580	74.99%	22	1st Semi	Olympic Dam	13	11	89	Coober Pedy	13	5	83
Hornridge	6	3	5	0	1416	1032	57.84%	12	2nd Semi	Roxby Districts	15	10	100	Hornridge	7	10	52
Olympic Dam	5	3	6	0	888	1046	45.92%	10	Preliminary	Hornridge	18	17	125	Olympic Dam	6	5	41
Coober Pedy	5	3	6	0	984	1371	41.78%	10	Grand	Roxby Districts	17	7	109	Hornridge	8	11	59
Andamooka	1	2	10	0	504	1502	25.12%	2									

Best in Grand Final: Jordan Mandemaker (Roxby Districts), Tim Milner (Hornridge).

== 2015 Ladder ==
Far North FL	Wins	Byes	Losses	Draws	For	Against	%	Pts	Final	Team	G	B	Pts	Team	G	B	Pts
Roxby Districts	10	3	1	1	1346	496	73.07%	44	1st Semi	Hornridge	13	12	90	East Roxby	9	10	64
Olympic Dam	8	3	4	0	901	731	55.21%	32	2nd Semi	Roxby Districts	21	14	140	Olympic Dam	0	4	4
East Roxby	7	3	5	0	1080	933	53.65%	28	Preliminary	Hornridge	15	8	98	Olympic Dam	10	2	62
Hornridge	3	3	9	0	763	1005	43.16%	12	Grand	Roxby Districts	18	13	121	Hornridge	3	4	22
Coober Pedy	1	3	10	1	542	1467	26.98%	4									

Best in Grand Final: James Telfer (Roxby Districts), Simon Henke (Hornridge).

== 2016 Ladder ==
Far North FL	Wins	Byes	Losses	Draws	For	Against	%	Pts	Final	Team	G	B	Pts	Team	G	B	Pts
Roxby Districts	11	3	1	0	1592	396	80.08%	44	1st Semi	Hornridge	11	8	74	Olympic Dam	5	6	36
East Roxby	10	3	2	0	1557	432	78.28%	40	2nd Semi	Roxby Districts	17	10	112	East Roxby	9	5	59
Hornridge	5	3	7	0	927	1067	46.49%	20	Preliminary	East Roxby	13	13	91	Hornridge	7	2	44
Olympic Dam	3	3	9	0	792	1164	40.49%	12	Grand	Roxby Districts	10	10	70	East Roxby	8	8	56
Coober Pedy	1	3	11	0	400	2209	15.33%	4									

Best in Grand Final: Brett Chesson (Roxby Districts), Lewis Grantham (East Roxby).

== 2017 Ladder ==
Far North FL	Wins	Byes	Losses	Draws	For	Against	%	Pts	Final	Team	G	B	Pts	Team	G	B	Pts
Roxby Districts	12	0	0	0	1524	374	80.30%	48	1st Semi	Olympic Dam	12	12	84	East Roxby	0	6	6
Hornridge	8	0	4	0	815	949	46.20%	32	2nd Semi	Roxby Districts	18	14	122	Hornridge	4	6	30
Olympic Dam	3	0	9	0	577	1001	36.57%	12	Preliminary	Hornridge	19	10	124	Olympic Dam	4	5	29
East Roxby	1	0	11	0	570	1162	32.91%	4	Grand	Roxby Districts	15	16	106	Hornridge	4	6	30

Best in Grand Final: Dylan Gamble (Roxby Districts), Shannon Haynes (Hornridge).

== 2018 Ladder ==
Far North FL	Wins	Byes	Losses	Draws	For	Against	%	Pts	Final	Team	G	B	Pts	Team	G	B	Pts
Hornridge	10	0	2	0	952	546	63.55%	40	1st Semi	East Roxby	9	14	68	Olympic Dam	4	4	28
Roxby Districts	9	0	3	0	1083	611	63.93%	36	2nd Semi	Roxby Districts	12	4	76	Hornridge	6	2	38
East Roxby	4	0	8	0	683	960	41.57%	16	Preliminary	Hornridge	10	10	70	East Roxby	10	9	69
Olympic Dam	1	0	11	0	495	1096	31.11%	4	Grand	Hornridge	12	9	81	Roxby Districts	6	4	40

Best in Grand Final: K Lynch (Hornridge), Ben Scott (Roxby Districts).

== 2019 Ladder ==
Far North FL	Wins	Byes	Losses	Draws	For	Against	%	Pts	Final	Team	G	B	Pts	Team	G	B	Pts
Hornridge	9	0	3	0	1078	639	62.78%	36	1st Semi								
Roxby Districts	7	0	5	0	774	942	45.10%	28	2nd Semi	Hornridge	10	10	70	Roxby Districts	5	8	38
East Roxby	5	0	7	0	763	691	52.47%	20	Preliminary	East Roxby	10	5	65	Roxby Districts	5	10	40
Olympic Dam	3	0	9	0	623	966	39.20%	12	Grand	Hornridge	14	12	96	East Roxby	9	7	61

Best in Grand Final: Brendan Lehmann (Hornridge), Karl Muller (East Roxby).

== 2020 Ladder – No competition due to COVID-19. ==
Covid 19 caused the cancellation of this season, as was the case with most Leagues.

== 2021 Ladder ==
Far North FL	Wins	Byes	Losses	Draws	For	Against	%	Pts	Final	Team	G	B	Pts	Team	G	B	Pts
Hornridge	7	0	3	0	805	475	62.89%	28	1st Semi	East Roxby	17	9	111	Roxby Districts	8	6	54
Olympic Dam	6	0	4	0	656	593	52.52%	24	2nd Semi	Hornridge	12	6	78	Olympic Dam	8	6	54
East Roxby	5	0	5	0	598	614	49.34%	20	Preliminary	Olympic Dam	12	11	83	East Roxby	5	7	37
Roxby Districts	2	0	8	0	426	803	34.66%	8	Grand	Hornridge	9	9	63	Olympic Dam	6	6	42

Best in Grand Final: Waylon Johncock (Hornridge), Michael Shaw (Olympic Dam).

== 2022 Ladder ==
Far North FL	Wins	Byes	Losses	Draws	For	Against	%	Pts	Final	Team	G	B	Pts	Team	G	B	Pts
Olympic Dam	9	0	3	0	1317	552	70.47%	18	1st Semi	Hornridge	17	20	122	East Roxby	6	0	36
Roxby Districts	7	0	5	0	866	822	51.30%	14	2nd Semi	Olympic Dam	14	10	94	Roxby Districts	4	6	30
Hornridge	6	0	6	0	902	660	57.75%	12	Preliminary	Hornridge	18	11	119	Roxby Districts	10	10	70
East Roxby	2	0	10	0	277	1328	17.26%	4	Grand	Olympic Dam	13	13	91	Hornridge	2	5	17

Best in Grand Final: Tyson Hornhardt (Olympic Dam), ? (Hornridge).

== 2023 Ladder ==
Far North FL	Wins	Byes	Losses	Draws	For	Against	%	Pts	Final	Team	G	B	Pts	Team	G	B	Pts
Hornridge	10	0	2	0	1048	487	68.27%	20	1st Semi	Olympic Dam	14	14	98	East Roxby	6	3	39
Roxby Districts	8	0	4	0	973	591	62.21%	16	2nd Semi	Hornridge	14	13	97	Roxby Districts	10	4	64
Olympic Dam	6	0	6	0	860	636	53.88%	12	Preliminary	Roxby Districts	10	7	67	Olympic Dam	5	12	42
East Roxby	0	0	12	0	329	1416	18.85%	0	Grand	Roxby Districts	10	5	65	Hornridge	5	10	40

Best in Grand Final: Jeremy Sezun (Roxby Districts), Jack Rigden (Hornridge).

== 2024 Ladder ==
Far North FL	Wins	Byes	Losses	Draws	For	Against	%	Pts	Final	Team	G	B	Pts	Team	G	B	Pts
Hornridge	12	0	0	0	1604	237	87.13%	24	1st Semi	Olympic Dam			Win	East Roxby			Forfeit
Roxby Districts	8	0	4	0	1159	575	66.84%	16	2nd Semi	Hornridge	13	10	88	Roxby Districts	3	6	24
Olympic Dam	4	0	8	0	572	1195	32.37%	8	Preliminary	Roxby Districts	24	7	151	Olympic Dam	4	5	29
East Roxby	0	0	12	0	210	1538	12.01%	0	Grand	Roxby Districts	14	2	86	Hornridge	8	7	55

Best in Grand Final: Luke Godfrey (Roxby Districts), Jon Secker (Hornridge).

== 2025 Ladder ==
Far North FL	Wins	Byes	Losses	Draws	For	Against	%	Pts	Final	Team	G	B	Pts	Team	G	B	Pts
Hornridge	11	0	1	0	1423	364	79.63%	22	1st Semi	East Roxby	12	12	84	Olympic Dam	6	12	48
Roxby Districts	7	0	5	0	902	645	58.31%	14	2nd Semi	Hornridge	19	12	126	Roxby Districts	4	6	30
Olympic Dam	4	0	8	0	637	1091	36.86%	8	Preliminary	Roxby Districts	9	14	68	East Roxby	5	11	41
East Roxby	2	0	10	0	443	1305	25.34%	4	Grand	Roxby Districts	9	5	59	Hornridge	7	10	52

Best in Grand Final: Craig Hall, Dylan Mostyn (Roxby Districts), Zach Noll (Hornridge).

== 2026 Ladder ==
Far North FL	Wins	Byes	Losses	Draws	For	Against	%	Pts	Final	Team	G	B	Pts	Team	G	B	Pts
Roxby Districts	11	0	1	0	1356	416	76.52%	22	1st Semi	Olympic Dam	11	10	76	East Roxby	5	9	39
Hornridge	9	0	3	0	1289	456	73.87%	18	2nd Semi	Hornridge	9	8	62	Roxby Districts	7	6	48
Olympic Dam	4	0	8	0	875	985	47.04	8	Preliminary	Roxby Districts	22	17	149	Olympic Dam	5	2	32
East Roxby	0	0	12	0	186	1849	9.14%	0	Grand	Roxby Districts	8	14	62	Hornridge	9	7	61

Best in Grand Final:Craig Hall (Roxby Districts) , Hakeem Johnson (Hornridge).

== Life Members ==
Year	Officials & Volunteers	Players – 10 Years & 100 Games
1951	Padre Stuart Calder M.B.E. (RIP); Fred S Lines (RIP)	
1954	Squadron Leader Robert Bruce Anderson (RIP); Peter H Bell (RIP)	
1958	Sergeant Len Brook; Keith Orr (RIP)	
1960	Dave Bywaters (RIP)	
1961	Brian Flanegan	
1962	H R "Dick" Zehender (RIP)	
1963	Denny Scott (RIP); William "Bill" Leverington (RIP)	
1965	Reg Fishwick (RIP); Harry Stapleton (RIP)	
1967	Ray Simpson (RIP); Leon Mueller	
1968	Gil R Smith	
1969	L R "Chick" Schollar (RIP); Tom Harding (RIP)	Ronald Vivian Weser (RIP) – Works; Terry C Lavender (RIP) – Centrals; Barry Gebler (RIP) – Works; Barry Rumble (RIP) – Centrals & Village; A W "Bill" Hooker – Village; Ken Rau – Centrals & Village
1970		Len "Ruffy" Jayne (RIP) – Village
1971		Peter Hardy (RIP) – Village
1973		Daniel "Paddy" O'Neill – R.A.A.F. & Centrals
1974		Klaus Wagnitz – Works
1975		William "Bill" Harvey – Centrals & Koolymilka
1976		Michael Hancock – Koolymilka
1977		Les Keatch – Centrals; Bruce Perkins – Works & Koolymilka; Raymond Dodds (RIP) – Koolymilka
1979	Pat Cullinan	John Shepherdson – Centrals, Works & Woomera North
1980	Laurie Braid; John Payne	Gary Smoker – Centrals; John Byrad – Village & Woomera North
1981	Bernie McCarthy	Terry Morphett – Centrals; Phil "Turkey" Turner – Centrals
1983		William Russell Campbell – Village & Woomera North
1988	Wally A Lewis	
1991		Tom Blackie – Koolymilka, Centrals & Woomera Rockets
1995		Zoltan Ferenci – Roxby Districts & Andamooka
1996	Geoff Steer	Kelly Hill – Mount Gunson & Olympic Dam; Graham Howard – Roxby Districts
1998	Jim M "T-Bone" Monfries	Tim Lange – Olympic Dam; Peter Lindner – Olympic Dam; Tony Richter – Olympic Dam; Gary Briggs – Andamooka
Circa; 2000		Brett Hornhardt – Olympic Dam; Jim McCarthy – Olympic Dam, Andamooka & Hornridge; Mark Lukick – Roxby Districts & Andamooka; Paul Clancy – Andamooka
Circa; 2001		Ray Allen – Roxby Districts; Rod Bain – Olympic Dam; Sean Veal – Woomera & Andamooka; Simon Fawkes – Andamooka; Warren Rose – Roxby Districts; Brian Partington (RIP) – Olympic Dam
2002		Jon Caputo – Olympic Dam
2003	Bev Zeptner	Darren Fairlie – Roxby Districts; Stuart Nunn – Andamooka
2004		Mark Young – Roxby Districts; Ryan Briggs – Andamooka & Hornridge; Stephen Daly – Olympic Dam & Hornridge
2005		Kym Clarke – Olympic Dam
2006		Craig Hancock – Leigh Creek & Hornridge
2007	Graham Warren	Rob Kraack – Andamooka
2008		Michael Uhlik – Andamooka; Sam Hall – Andamooka; Chad Oldfield – Roxby Districts, Hornridge, Andamooka & Coober Pedy
2010	Tracey Ryan	
2011		Austin Monfries – Olympic Dam & Andamooka; Brent Johnson – Hornridge; Nigel Tutthill – Olympic Dam & Hornridge; Scott Montgomerie – Andamooka & Olympic Dam
2012	Debra Steinhauser	Brett Chesson – Roxby Districts; Cody Kenny – Olympic Dam & Roxby Districts
2013		Mark Freeth – Olympic Dam
2014		Cameron Green – Olympic Dam; Mark Bell – Coober Pedy; Ricky Prosser – Roxby Districts; Steve Kaminski – Roxby Districts; Tyson Hornhardt – Olympic Dam
2015		Damian Hann – Hornridge; Jack Orr – Roxby Districts & East Roxby; Todd Paull – Roxby Districts & East Roxby
2016		Kain Zeptner – Roxby Districts & East Roxby; Spencer Crafter-King – Roxby Districts
2018	Kym McEvoy	Ben Grimston – Hornridge; Andrew Moss – East Roxby; Jake Roberts – Roxby Districts; James Telfer – Roxby Districts
2019		Ernst Walker – East Roxby; Cameron Green – Olympic Dam
2021	Travis Brougham	Lachlan Munro – Hornridge
2023		Craig Hall – Roxby Districts
2025		Ben Hampel – Roxby Districts; David Kaminski - Roxby Districts; Jordan Mandemaker - Roxby Districts; James Beeham - Olympic Dam
2026	Andrew Moss	Ash Webster - Hornridge

== Books ==
- Encyclopedia of South Australian country football clubs / compiled by Peter Lines. ISBN 9780980447293
- South Australian country football digest / by Peter Lines ISBN 9780987159199
