= Electricity Trust of South Australia =

Electricity provider owned by the South Australian Government (1946–1999)

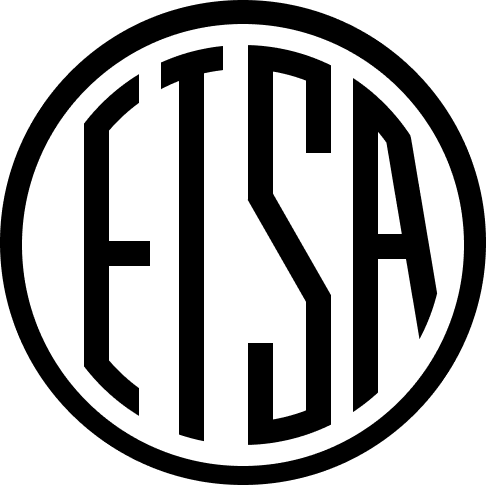
- Industry: Electricity generation, distribution and retailing
- Predecessor: Adelaide Electric Supply Company
- Founded: 1946; 80 years ago
- Founder: Government of South Australia
- Defunct: 1999
- Fate: Disaggregated and privatised
- Successors: ETSA Utilities; ElectraNet; AGL
- Area served: South Australia
- Owner: Government of South Australia

The Electricity Trust of South Australia (ETSA) was the South Australian Government-owned monopoly vertically integrated electricity provider from 1946 until its privatisation in 1999 by Liberal Party Premier John Olsen. The privatisation, which broke Olsen's 1997 election promises not to privatise the Trust, lead to immediate price increases for consumers, the loss of ongoing revenue for the state budget and led to the cancellation of proposed interstate grid connections in order to protect the value of the newly private assets. By 2017 the privatisation had caused South Australia to have the highest electricity prices in the world.

== Precursors ==
=== Early days (1882–1900) ===
Charles Todd, who oversaw telegraphic communications in the colony and beyond, also introduced the idea of electrical street lighting, necessitating a public electricity supply. An Act of Parliament created the South Australian Electric Company in 1882, but the company did not ever start to produce electricity, owing mainly to opposition by those holding interests in the South Australian Gas Company, which supplied power using coal gas.

The South Australian Electric Light and Motive Power Company was registered in March 1895 and was authorised to provide power throughout the colony of South Australia. Previously, municipal councils had been empowered to provide electricity within their areas, but none did so. The company started to supply electricity from its Nile Street generator to the streets of Port Adelaide on 1 January 1899, but the quality was poor.

Around the turn of the century, things started to change, firstly through the appointment of engineer Frederick William Herbert Wheadon (1872–1947) to the company in 1899, and then through British interests in the company. The directors of the SA Electric Light and Motive Power company were based in London, and in the same year, assisted by Wheadon, the English Brush Electrical Engineering Company along with the Electric Lighting and Traction Company of Australia, which had interests in Victoria, bought the company, with all of its assets. In 1900 the City of Adelaide signed a contract with the South Australian Electric Light and Motive Power Company to provide the power for King William Street's lighting, which also enabled the provision of electricity to private customers.

=== Grenfell Street Power Station (1901–1925) ===
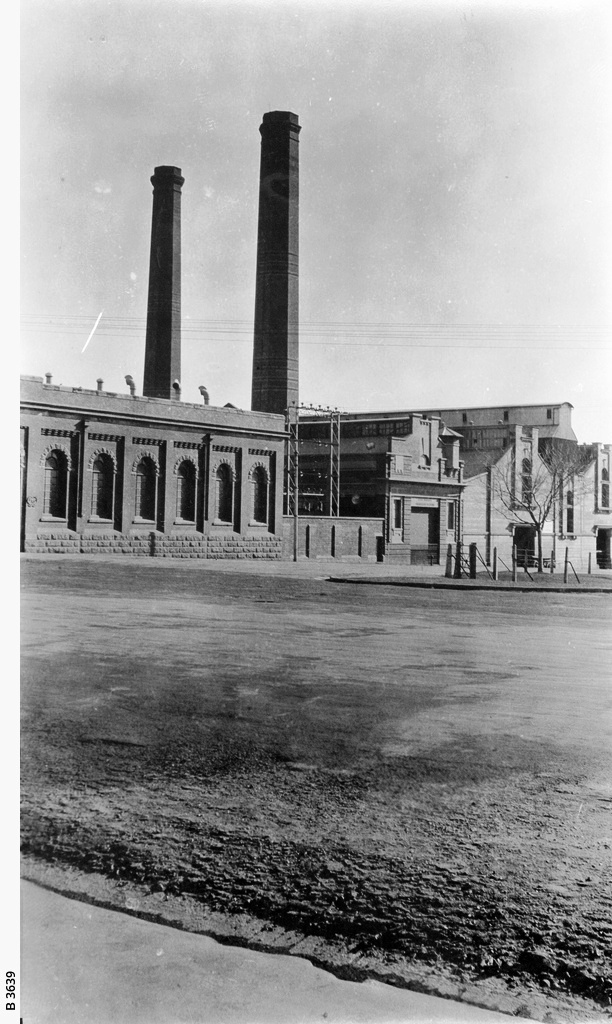
Adelaide Electric Supply Co. power station, East Tce, c.1926

A temporary generating plant in Tam O'Shanter Place at the corner of Devonshire Place (off Grenfell Street) began supplying electricity to Adelaide in 1900. Wheadon in the meantime created plans for a new coal-fired power station on the corner of Grenfell Street and East Terrace, with the main buildings fronting Grenfell Street designed by South Australian architect Alfred Wells in a single-storey design. The new power station, incorporating boilers, steam generators and a direct current (DC) electric generator able to distribute 400 kilowatts, opened on 19 November 1901. It provided electricity to North Adelaide in 1902, with Norwood Unley, Hindmarsh and Thebarton following over the next ten years.

On 31 August 1904 ownership of the company passed to the privately owned and London-based Adelaide Electric Supply Company (AESC, or AESCo). Over time the company extended electricity supply via a network of substations to most of the suburbs and other settled areas of the state, as well as the electric tramway system in Adelaide, by 1926. The invention and use of the Stobie pole contributed to the success of the rollout by the company.

In 1912 the original building was substantially remodelled into a double-storey building that included offices, a laboratory, a room for testing the various instruments, and the company's switchboard and other communications systems. Two tall brick chimneys stood parallel to Grenfell Street behind the main building (demolished in 1926), and entrances to some of the buildings opened onto East Terrace.

By 1917, the output of the power station was 12,000 kilowatts, driven by the great demand. Wheadon and other directors of AESCo foresaw that technical problems would inhibit increasing the power output at that site, and started working on plans for a new site at Osborne on the Port River. Construction was delayed by the outbreak of World War I in 1918.

In August 1923, AESC opened the Osborne 'A' Power Station near Port Adelaide on an 84-year term lease, and two years later, the Grenfell Street Power Station closed down.

The main building of the old power station (including the offices facing Grenfell Street) remained in the ownership of the company, being leased out for use as a TAFE college for some time. The building was heritage-listed on the South Australian Heritage Register in November 1984. In 1989 the building was acquired by the state and federal governments for the creation of Tandanya National Aboriginal Cultural Institute. The old converter stations face East Terrace. Converter Station No. 1 was in operation from 1901 to 1925, and the adjacent on from 1923 to 1967. There is an "Historic Engineering Plaque" on a ground level plinth just east of the north-east corner of the building, which was dedicated by the Institution of Engineers, ETSA and the Adelaide City Council on 6 April 1995.

=== WW2 and coal shortage (1939–1946) ===
The boilers in the Osborne station initially used black coal imported from New South Wales, which, until 1946, held a monopoly over electricity supplies in Adelaide. During World War II, coal supplies became critically low. The state government sought to establish a reliable long-term source of coal for the state and the sub-bituminous coal from the Telford Cut at Leigh Creek, though of poorer quality, was considered the most viable source. The deposits seemed extensive and extracting the coal by open-cut methods was considered feasible. Exploratory boring started in 1941 and plans were made to develop the first open-cut mine. The South Australian Government, led by Liberal and Country League (later Liberal Party of South Australia) Premier Tom Playford, had committed to the use of Leigh Creek coal, and excavation started in 1943.

== Establishment of ETSA ==
In 1946, AESC refused to use Leigh Creek coal as proposed by the government, even going to the extent of buying boilers that could only use black coal. Playford responded by requesting Commonwealth funds to nationalise the company, which was provided by Labor Prime Minister Ben Chifley. The Electricity Trust of South Australia (ETSA) was created in September 1946 for the nationalisation of AESC. Chief engineer F.W.H. Wheadon, who had led AESC for 48 years, retired at this point, aged around 73.

The LCL suffered a split in its ranks because of the nationalisation, and the state legislation passed only with the support of ALP and independent members of parliament.

Work on the Osborne 'B' Power Station started in 1947 and was completed soon after. The boilers at the Osborne Power Stations were modified to burn Leigh Creek coal.

In 1948, control of the Leigh Creek coalfield was transferred to ETSA, its largest user.

ETSA built major power stations near Port Augusta: Playford A was completed in 1954, Playford B in 1963 and later Northern in 1985, and on Torrens Island. The combined Playford A and B plants had a total generating capacity of 330 megawatts (440,000 hp). Northern Power Station was fuelled by Leigh Creek coal. The use of large excavating machines and efficient mining equipment at Leigh Creek, together with the rebuilding of a railway line between Leigh Creek and Port Augusta by the Commonwealth Railways, resulted in economic production and delivery of coal to the power station. Pacific National provided the coal freight service from 2001.

== Privatisation ==
After the State Bank collapse in the early 1990s, South Australia was left with a large debt after fulfilling its obligation to bail out the bank. In the lead up to the 1997 state election, the incumbent Olsen Liberal government pledged not to privatise ETSA. However, after being re-elected, the government proceeded with privatisation plans citing the dire financial situation, with new information such as a warning from the State Auditor General and the introduction of the Australian National Electricity Market.

Following the 1997 state election, the Olsen Liberal government needed the support of an additional two non-Liberal upper house members to pass legislation, with the Australian Democrats retaining the balance of power on three seats. However, defectors from Labor in the upper house, Terry Cameron and Trevor Crothers, brought independent member Nick Xenophon in to play. In 1998, Xenophon voted with Cameron and the government to proceed with the second reading of the ETSA power sale bill. The bill became law when Cameron and Crothers voted with the Liberal government. They subsequently resigned from the Australian Labor Party.

The privatisation involved the disaggregation of the vertically integrated business, with the generation, transmission, distribution and retail assets taken up by distinct investors. However, the South Australian Government retained freehold ownership of the generation, transmission and distribution assets, with the investors acquiring long term leasehold interests in the assets. Also, the Government introduced a regime of industry regulation, calculated to ensure that the public interest was protected and that safety standards are maintained.

The purchaser of the distribution business took the name "ETSA Utilities" (later renamed "SA Power Networks"), while the acquirers of the other parts of the business adopted distinct identities for their businesses.

With privatisation came the establishment of a competitive retail market for electricity. The retailing component of ETSA was acquired by AGL. With the advent of competition, other electricity retailers entered the marketplace, offering consumers choice- competition focussing on tariffs and discounts for "bundling" of gas and electricity supply from one retailer.

Although the state's fiscal situation was substantially improved with funds derived from the sell-off, debate continued as to whether ETSA's privatisation has been to the benefit of the South Australian community. It was estimated that with higher electricity prices, the net loss from ETSA would total between $2 and 3 billion over a ten-year period.

== Contribution to South Australia's post-war growth ==
ETSA participated in the post-war growth and industrialisation of the South Australian economy, including providing modern and reliable power for regional areas. As a vertically-integrated generator, distributor and retailer of electricity, ETSA was responsible for the development of new energy sources. Coal was mined at Telford Cut near Leigh Creek.

ETSA expanded the electricity distribution network to areas where there was previously no supply, or only low voltage (32 volt) supply generated locally. By the end of the Playford era, South Australia had one of the cheapest and most efficient electricity networks in the world. The same low price for electricity was charged in Mount Gambier as it was at the point of production at Torrens Island.

Following the deregulation of the state's electricity market from 1 January 2003, AGL's electricity prices increased by an average 23.7%. This continued as a political sore point for both the Labor and Liberal Parties in South Australia: with the Liberals having enacted privatisation, then the Rann government approving the price increases. Further price increases followed, and by 1 July 2017 led to South Australia having the highest electricity prices in the world. With the closure of South Australia's coal plants there was a rapid increase in solar and wind energy, backed by large-scale batteries. As this penetration of renewables has started to flow through to generation prices, South Australia now has more competitive retail pricing.

== Headquarters ==
ETSA headquarters were for years in a building called Kelvin House at 233 North Terrace. Designed by Eric McMichael (architect of the Odeon Star cinema at Semaphore) in Art Deco style in 1925–6, the building was later heritage-listed and renamed Security House In April/May 2023 the entire second floor of the building will be occupied by the History Trust of South Australia.

== See also ==
- Electricity Supply Industry Planning Council
- Essential Services Commission of South Australia
- SA Power Networks
