= Cu-River Mining =

Australian mining business

- Industry: Mining
- Founded: 2014; 12 years ago in Adelaide, South Australia, Australia
- Founder: Yong Gang Shan
- Headquarters: Adelaide, Australia
- Products: iron ore
- Owner: Yong Gang Shan
- Website: www.curiver.com.au

Cu-River Mining Pty. Ltd. is a privately owned Australian resources company with interests in iron ore mining and port development projects in South Australia. It is the smaller of two iron ore exporters operating in the state, the larger being the GFG Alliance. The company is owned by Adelaide-based businessman, Yong Gang Shan and as of 2019 its only producing asset was the Cairn Hill mine in the state's Far North. The company has contracted mining, processing and freight logistics services to Agile Mining Services and Lucas Total Contract Solutions

== History ==
In 2014, Cu-River Mining purchased the Cairn Hill iron ore mine in the Woomera Prohibited Area, near Coober Pedy in South Australia. The mine was previously owned by Termite Resources; a joint venture between ASX-listed IMX Resources and the Taifeng Yuan Chuang International Development Company. Cu-River Mining produced its first iron ore from Cairn Hill in 2016.

In October 2017, the company announced that it would invest $800 million in expanding the Cairn Hill mine. Cu-River Mining has contracted JiuJiang Mining Australia (the Australian arm of the JiuJiang Group, China) to undertake infrastructure improvements at Cairn Hill.

In May 2019, the future of Cu-River's operations in the Woomera Prohibited Area were called into question, following national security concerns regarding its proximity to a restricted weapons and technology testing range.

In January 2020 it was announced that Cu-River mining was withdrawing from Cairn Hill after its 270 million AUD expansion plan, though the company was still listed as the mine's tenement holders and operator in the project's 2020-21 compliance report to the Government of South Australia.

Cu-River Mining's interests are represented to the South Australian parliament by the lobbying firm, Silk Road Commercial Pty Ltd. Silk Road has no other political lobbying clients on its books as of 2021.

== Port Playford development ==
In January 2019, the company purchased the site of the former Northern and Playford A and B power stations at Port Augusta, where it intends to construct a port for the transshipment of iron ore from its existing Cairn Hill mine, future iron ore projects Snaefell and Tomahawk, and potentially wheat and other commodities. The 1068 hectare property's existing 5 kilometre long rail loop and unloading facilities (previously used to unload and stockpile coal from Leigh Creek) would be utilised by the prospective port. An export capacity of 15 million tonnes per annum is anticipated by the company, with scope to increase to 50 million tonnes.

In 2020, Cu-River Mining signed a Memorandum of Understanding with Haviliah Resources, a prospective iron ore exporter with leases to mineral deposits in the Braemar region in South Australia.

In January 2021, Port Playford received development approval from the South Australian government. Cu-River mining intends to use barges to transship ore onto Cape-sized vessels at the existing transshipment points in Spencer Gulf that were created for transshipment of iron ore from Whyalla. Work started on the port in August 2021, with the aim of first shipments in the second half of 2023. The first ore is expected to come from Cairn Hill mine (owned by Cu-River) and from Peculiar Knob mine (owned by Peak Iron).
