= Port Augusta Power Station =

Port Augusta Power Station may refer to:

- Playford A Power Station, built in 1954
- Playford B Power Station, built in 1963
- Northern Power Station (South Australia), built in 1985
