= Leigh Creek =

Leigh Creek may refer to:

== Places ==
- Leigh Creek, South Australia, an outback town
  - Leigh Creek Coalfield discovered in 1888 and the site of a small underground mine
    - Telford Cut, the open-cut coal mine operating from 1943 to 2015
  - Leigh Creek Airport
- Leigh Creek, Victoria, a town in Central Victoria east of Ballarat

== Other uses ==
- Leigh Creek Energy, listed on the Australian Securities Exchange as LCK
