= Port Paterson, South Australia =

Port Paterson Port Augusta, South Australia
- Coordinates: 32.55549°S 137.836553°E
- Population: 73 (SAL 2016)
- Established: 3 August 1993
- Gazetted: 17 February 1994
- Postcode(s): 5700
- Elevation: 7 m (23 ft)
- Time zone: ACST (UTC+9:30)
  - Summer (DST): ACST (UTC+10:30)
- Location: 273.8 km (170 mi) north of Adelaide; 9 km (6 mi) south of Port Augusta
- LGA(s): City of Port Augusta
- Region: Far North
- County: Frome
- State electorate(s): Stuart
- Federal division(s): Grey
| Mean max temp | Mean min temp | Annual rainfall |
| 24.7 °C; 76 °F | 13.6 °C; 56 °F | 257.0 mm 10.1 in |
Suburbs around Port Paterson:
| Spencer Gulf | Port Augusta | Stirling North |
| Spencer Gulf | Port Paterson | Stirling North; Woolundunga |
| Winninowie | Winninowie | Winninowie |
- Footnotes: Location; Adjoining localities

Port Paterson is a locality in the Australian state of South Australia located on the east coast of Spencer Gulf at the gulf's northern end about 237.4 kilometres (147.5 miles) north of the state capital of Adelaide and about 9 kilometres (5.6 miles) south of the centre of Port Augusta.

Its boundaries were created in August 1993 over land that was “originally a private subdivision of section 540” in the cadastral unit of the Hundred of Davenport. Its name is reported as being derived from “James Pat(t)erson” who is described as an “early pastoralist”. Port Paterson is bounded by the coastline to the west and by the Augusta Highway to the east and includes the former power generation facilities that burned coal mined at Leigh Creek - Playford A, Playford B and Northern Power Station.

As of 2015, the majority land use within the locality was industry which was associated with the former power stations. Other uses include primary sector industry (a large solar-powered greenhouse owned by Sundrop Farms), residential and conservation which concerns the strip of land immediately adjoining the coastline except for that used for the former power stations.

Port Paterson is located within the federal division of Grey, the state electoral district of Stuart and the local government area of the City of Port Augusta.
