= Witchelina, South Australia =

Witchelina
- Suburb
- Coordinates: 30.12089008°S 137.91211129°E
- Country: Australia
- State: South Australia
- LGA: Pastoral Unincorporated Area
- Location: 487 km (303 mi) north of Adelaide city centre; 32 km (20 mi) west of Leigh Creek
- Established: 2013

Government
  - State electorate: Stuart
  - Federal division: Grey
- Time zone: UTC+9:30 (ACST)
  - Summer (DST): UTC+10:30 (ACST)
- Postcode: 5731
Suburbs around Witchelina
Callanna	Callanna	Marree Station; Mundowdna
Stuarts Creek; Mulgaria	Witchelina	Mundowdna; Farina Station; Myrtle Station
Lake Torrens	Lake Torrens; Beltana Station	Myrtle Station

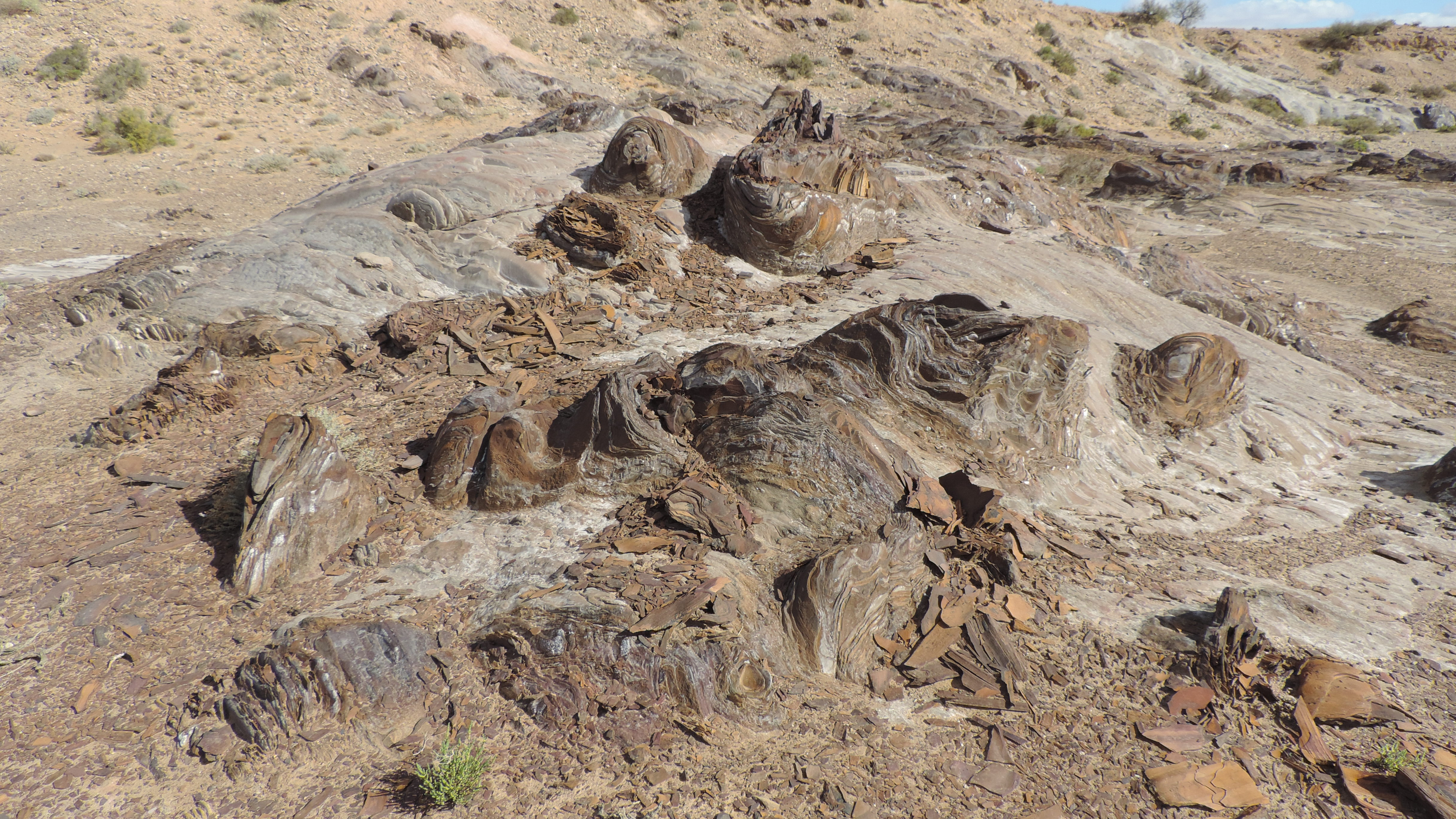
Multiple Liesegang Rings in sedimentary material at Witchelina, South Australia

Witchelina is a locality in the Australian state of South Australia located about 32 kilometres (20 miles) to the north-west of the town of Leigh Creek and about 487 kilometres (303 miles) north of the Adelaide city centre. The locality was established on 26 April 2013 in respect to “the long established local name.” Its name is derived from the former pastoral lease of the same name. Witchelina is located within the federal Division of Grey, the state electoral district of Stuart, the Pastoral Unincorporated Area of South Australia and the state's Far North region. The land use within Witchelina is concerned with the use of the former pastoral lease as a private protected area also known as Witchelina which has fully occupied its extent as of 2010.

== See also ==
- List of cities and towns in South Australia
