= Ajax Mine Fossil Reef =

Archeological site in South Australia

The Ajax Mine Fossil Reef is a heritage-listed site of palaeontological and geological significance in the Flinders Ranges of South Australia. The site was originally a copper mine, known as Emu Creek and Elvina (or Elvena) before being renamed Ajax Copper Mine. It contains an extraordinary level of diversity of fossils from the Cambrian, as well as over 100 type species. The mine's fossiliferous limestone is known throughout the world as the Ajax Limestone, and is known for its many Archaeocyatha fossils. The site is part of the Flinders Ranges geological successions, where abundant and diverse arrays of fossils show how animal life began on Earth over a period of 350 million years.

The site is heritage-listed on the South Australian Heritage Register, and is also a Geological Heritage site. Ajax Hill is one of a group of seven geographically separate areas that were submitted to the UNESCO World Heritage Centre for consideration as a World Heritage Site in 2021, and as of August 2025 remain on the tentative list.

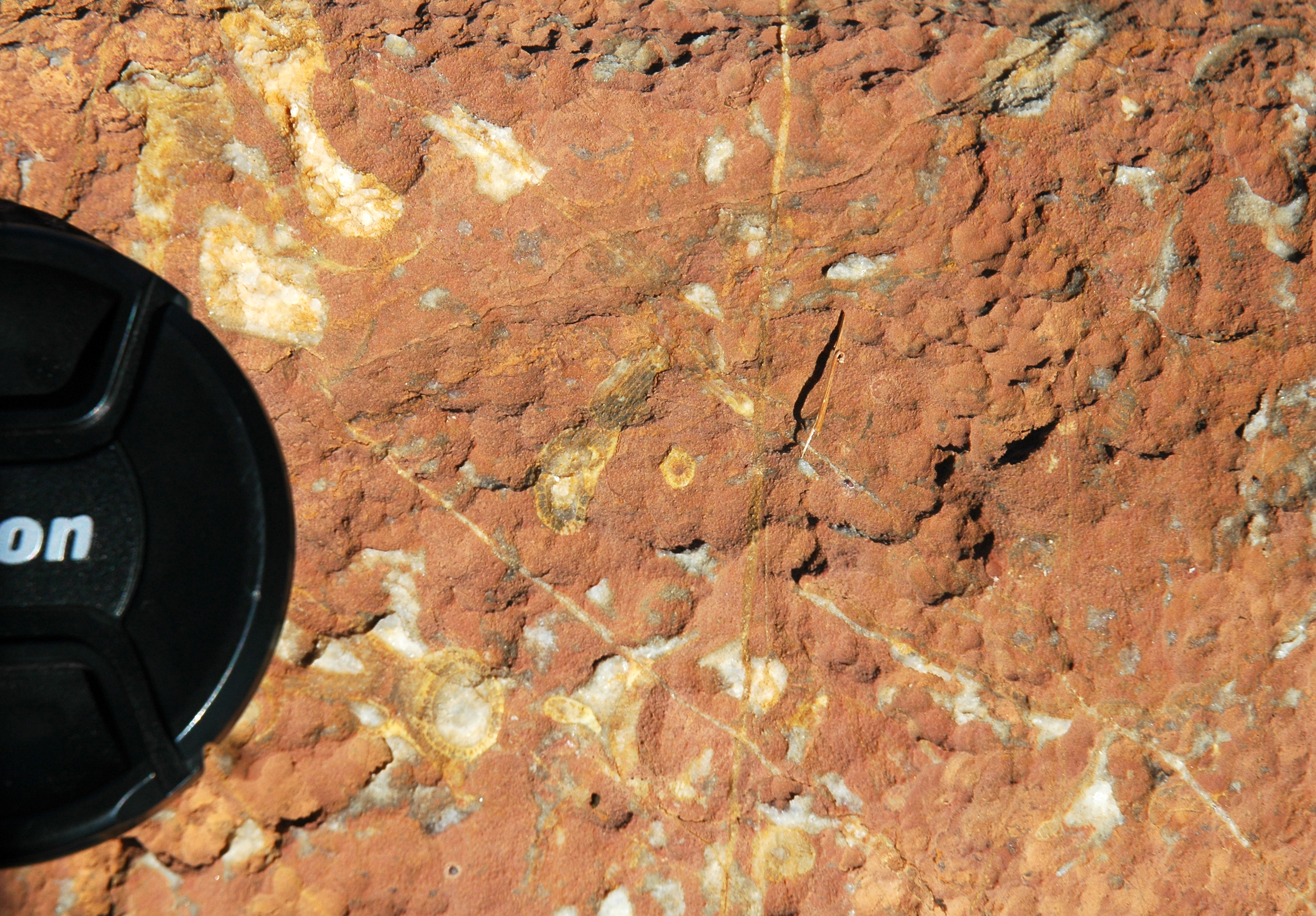
Archaeocyathan limestone

== History ==
The mine is located on Puttapa, a pastoral lease around 10 mi (16 km) north of the historic town of Beltana. (Note: Note: It is east of Beltana Station.) The mine was formerly known as Emu Creek and Elvina or Elvena.

In December 1899, the mine comprised four 40-acre (16 ha) claims. As described in Supplementary Mining Records: Consisting of Notes on the Iron and Phosphate Deposits of South Australia, by L.C.E. Gee of the South Australian Department of Mines in 1905, a shaft had been sunk on the lode to a depth of 100 ft (30 m) "the formation being about 2 ft (0.61 m) wide, and composed of brown ironstained slate material. The copper is principally green carbonate, occurring in veins and pockets".

In 1891, a prospector, W. Bentley Greenwood, found the first Cambrian Archaeocyatha fossil near the Ajax Mine. In December 1892, a specimen from the mine was presented at a meeting of the Geological Society of London. On 5 September 1893, J.J. East, registrar of the South Australian School of Mines and Industries, exhibited the specimen at a meeting of the Royal Society of South Australia, noting "previously unrecorded skeletal characters".

Access to the area became easier following completion of a new railway line up to Oodnadatta. In February 1906, the then 23-year-old geologist Douglas Mawson (later famous for his Antarctic expeditions) made his first visit to the Flinders Ranges, accompanied by geologist Walter Howchin and Thomas Griffith Taylor. (Note: Taylor, who was a friend of Mawson since their time as students at the University of Sydney, and a previous collaborator on a geology project, later became an internationally renowned geographer as well as participating in Robert Scott's second Antarctic expedition.) In March 1906 Mawson submitted a short handwritten geological report to the state government based on his work, titled "Notes on the Geological Features of the Beltana Destrict". The report, which described the geology of the area around Beltana, as well as the abandoned Ajax Copper Mine, was not published until 2007. Taylor's research led to two published papers on Archaeocyatha in 1908 and 1910, the latter being a landmark paleontological monograph, in which he acknowledges the work of Mawson and Howchin.

== Description ==
The old mine site is now a fossil site, situated on a low rise covered in gibber. It contains a large number of Lower (early) Cambrian Archaeocyath fossils, exposed in limestone at ground level.

== Significance ==
The mine's fossiliferous limestone is known throughout the world as the Ajax Limestone, and contains a sample of almost every species of archaeocyatha (a class of marine sponges, Phylum Porifera) known to have existed within the Australian-Antarctic geologic province. These sponges played an important role in creating the first coral reefs on Earth, around 525 million years ago.

The diversity of Ajax Hill is much greater than any other assemblage in the province, and it also contains over 100 type species, which include over 40 type species from the Cambrian period. The site has made a considerable contribution to the history of geological science in Australia, including supporting the development of methods for the study of fossils. They are "widely acknowledged as some of the best preserved archaeocyaths on Earth". Ajax Hill is the type locality for the vast majority of Australian archaeocyath species and genera described so far, and also the location of the largest number of diverse species of archaeocyath in the world.

The reef is also significant for its contributions to the process of global correlation, including matching the geological record of Cambrian age rocks from all continents, and searching for base metals such as copper, lead, and zinc in rocks of this age around the globe.

== Heritage listings ==
On 28 August 2014, the mine was heritage-listed on the South Australian Heritage Register as "Ajax Mine Fossil Reef", "as a place of palaeontological and geological significance". Its global significance is owing to a find of a large number of diverse archaeocyath fossils.

The site was listed by the Geological Heritage Subcommittee of the SA Division of the Geological Society of Australia as a Geological Heritage site.

=== World Heritage bid ===
As of 2022 the fossil site is one of seven sites in the Flinders Ranges under consideration for UNESCO World Heritage status, listed as Ajax Hill. It is part of the Flinders Ranges geological successions, where abundant and diverse arrays of fossils show how animal life began on Earth over a period of 350 million years. These areas were submitted to the UNESCO World Heritage Centre for consideration as a World Heritage Site under criterion (viii) on 15 April 2021, and as of August 2025 remain on the tentative list.
