= Beltana =

- Town
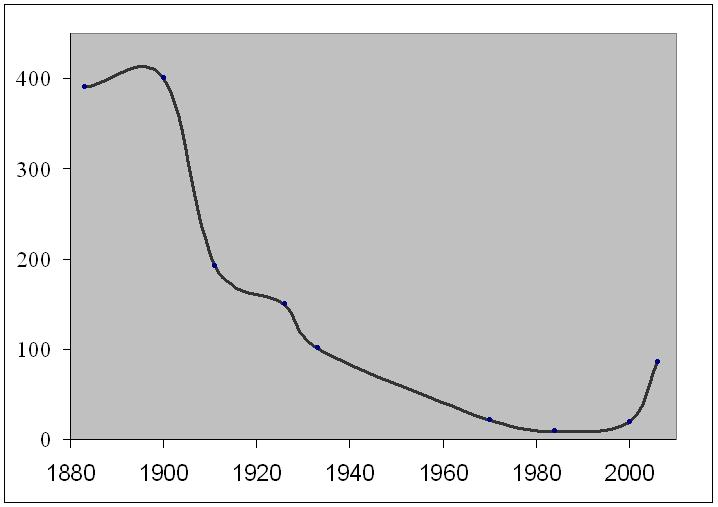
- Beltana's population since 1880

- Coordinates: 30°48′50″S 138°24′55″E
- Country: Australia
- State: South Australia
- LGA: Outback Communities Authority
- Location: 32 km (20 mi) from Leigh Creek; 128 km (80 mi) from Hawker; 540 km (340 mi) from Adelaide
- Established: 2 October 1873 (town); 29 May 1997 (locality)

Government
  - State electorate: Stuart
  - Federal division: Grey
- Elevation: 296 m (971 ft)

Population
  - Total: 35 (SAL 2021)
- Time zone: UTC+9:30 (ACST)
  - Summer (DST): UTC+10:30 (ACST)
- Postcode: 5730
- Mean max temp: 26.4 °C (79.5 °F)
- Mean min temp: 12.8 °C (55.0 °F)
- Annual rainfall: 228.6 mm (9.00 in)
Localities around Beltana
Beltana Station	Puttapa	Puttapa
Beltana Station	Beltana	Puttapa; Moorillah
Beltana Station	Moorillah	Moorillah

Beltana is a town 540 kilometres (336 mi) north of Adelaide, South Australia. Beltana is known for continuing to exist long after the reasons for its existence had ceased. The town's history began in the 1870s with the advent of copper mining in the area, construction of the Australian Overland Telegraph Line and The Ghan railway and began to decline in 1941 with the beginning of coal mining at Leigh Creek. The fortune of the town was sealed by the 1983 realignment of the main road away from the town. The town, adjacent cemetery and railway structures are now part of a designated State Heritage Area declared in 1987.

Beltana has important links with the overland telegraph, transcontinental railway, mining, outback services, Australian Inland Mission and also has "Afghan" sites relating to its past as a camel-based transport centre.

The town has had horse racing since 1876, an annual picnic races and gymkhana and a biennial pastoral field day. These events are no longer held. The Beltana roadhouse, now 12 kilometres (7.5 mi) from Beltana on the main highway between Parachilna and Leigh Creek, acted as the town's local store until it closed in 2016.

== Landscape ==
Beltana lies 240 m above sea level between the often dry Warrioota and Sliding Rock creeks near Mount Deception. Due to the flatness of the country, the town's proximity to the creeks and the area's usually unpredictable weather, heavy rainfall has often led to flooding. Beltana has experienced six months with no rain (1960–61) and six months with over 300 mm of rain (1975–76) and drought has caused the area to be unstocked for long periods (1903–09). Rainfall has ranged from 57 mm in 1902 to a record 408.6 mm in 1974 with a long term average of 205 mm. There are occasional winter frosts, hailstorms and one recorded snowfall (on Mount Hack and Mount Stuart in July 1971).

Saltbush, bluebush and acacias are native plants that, with the reduction in stocking over the last decades of the 20th century, are beginning to return to the town area. River red gums line the creeks and there is a nearby yellow-footed rock-wallaby population.

== History ==
=== Original inhabitants ===
The original inhabitants were the Kuyani and Adnyamathanha Aboriginal people who used the area as a camp due to the nearby springs. With the arrival of Europeans their traditional lifestyle was disrupted and many of them began working as stockmen on pastoral runs. During the early years of European settlement they kept a camp near Beltana Station but later moved closer to the town at Warrioota Creek. As the town was gradually depopulated some Aboriginal people occupied the abandoned buildings so by the late 1960s they again formed the majority of the population.

=== Naming ===
Beltana takes its name from that of a nearby sheep station, west of the current town, which provided a stopover point for travellers, missionaries, explorers, and miners. The name Beltana may have come from the Adnyamathanha word for running water or crossing of the waters or may be an adaptation of veldana for skin or cloak. Linguists have suggested that its origin lies in the Kuyani name for the location, Paltha-nha, although records and interpretations vary. It is likely to be associated with the nearby Warioota Creek, possibly at a junction with another creek. It may also have come from the village of Beltana, Tasmania, or a word about bravery or courage from Ireland, and finally one of the station managers believed it simply indicated the place where the station bell was rung.

=== The town ===
Land in the area was first taken up for pastoral use by John Haines in 1854, taken over by Thomas Elder in 1862, and amalgamated in 1867 into the Beltana Pastoral Company of Elder and Samuel Stuckey. In 1866 Elder and Stuckey shipped in 109 "Afghans" and their camels, forming the basis for the area's mid-19th century transport. The town's first building was Martin's Eating House, which was built in 1870 to take advantage of the discovery of copper at Sliding Rock, 20 kilometres (12 miles) east of Beltana. The town's location had already been chosen as a repeater station site for the Australian Overland Telegraph Line and in 1870 the telegraph contract of Charles Todd brought more life to the area, with a telegraph station set up next to the only house on the site.

In 1873 the town was surveyed and laid out with an enthusiastic 115 allotments, room allowed for parklands and further expansion, with reserved allotments for a school, police station and hospital. On 2 October 1873, it was proclaimed under The Northern Townships Act 1872 as a town, and is sometimes referred to as a government town.

In 1877 significant water was struck at the Sliding Rock mine and the mine failed, with many moving to Beltana. The mine's remnants survive today as the Sliding Rock Mine Ruins, which are listed on the South Australian Heritage Register. The failure of Sliding Rock coupled with the 1881 arrival of the railway brought an influx of families and within five years there was a brewery, store and school. Other copper mines in the area began working and the town became the railhead for copper ore, sheep and wool. In 1869 a ship, the Beltana, was a new ship built for the Port Augusta to London run and operated until 1897.

Beltana’s best time was between 1875 and the 1920s. During these years mining activity was at its height. The town supported a brewery, two hotels, post and telegraph office, school, police station, doctor, court-house, church, baker, butcher, blacksmith, hospital, railway station, cricket team, race meetings, a saddle maker, carriage maker, mining exchange, several shops and, at times, as many as 500 people.

Mechanisation, mine closure, drought and the Great Depression led to the slow decline of Beltana as a service centre for the region from 1920 onwards. The railway realignment consequent to gauge change in 1956 and road movement in 1983 completed the reversal of the town's fortune.

=== Explorers ===
The town was, for some time, the starting point of many central Australian expeditions and explorations including those by Ernest Giles in 1872, Peter Warburton in 1873, Ross in 1874, Lewis in 1874–75, and Lawrence Wells in 1883.

=== Beltana today ===
With the loss of the railway, main road, mining, telegraph and the collapse of the nearby Leigh Creek coal mine, all of the original reasons for the town to exist have vanished. The population reached 9 in 1984 and today the town survives as a historic tourist site and living ghost town. The town does not have any piped water as the 1940s water pipe from Leigh Creek to Sliding Rock bypassed Beltana. Water is supplied from various wells and the old railway dam with Puttapa Springs, a permanent water source, 8 kilometres (5.0 miles) from the town.

Most surviving buildings are now in private hands and not open to the public. There is an interpretive trail with signs detailing the history of many of them; since they are privately owned and some are inhabited, permanently or otherwise, some have "keep out" signs posted on them. Beltana has a campground run by the community that can be booked on Hipcamps.

=== Locality ===
In 1997, boundaries for a locality with the name of Beltana were established under the Geographical Names Act 1991 to "incorporate suburban areas to and adjacent areas to Beltana". These boundaries included the Government Town of Beltana.

== Town buildings ==
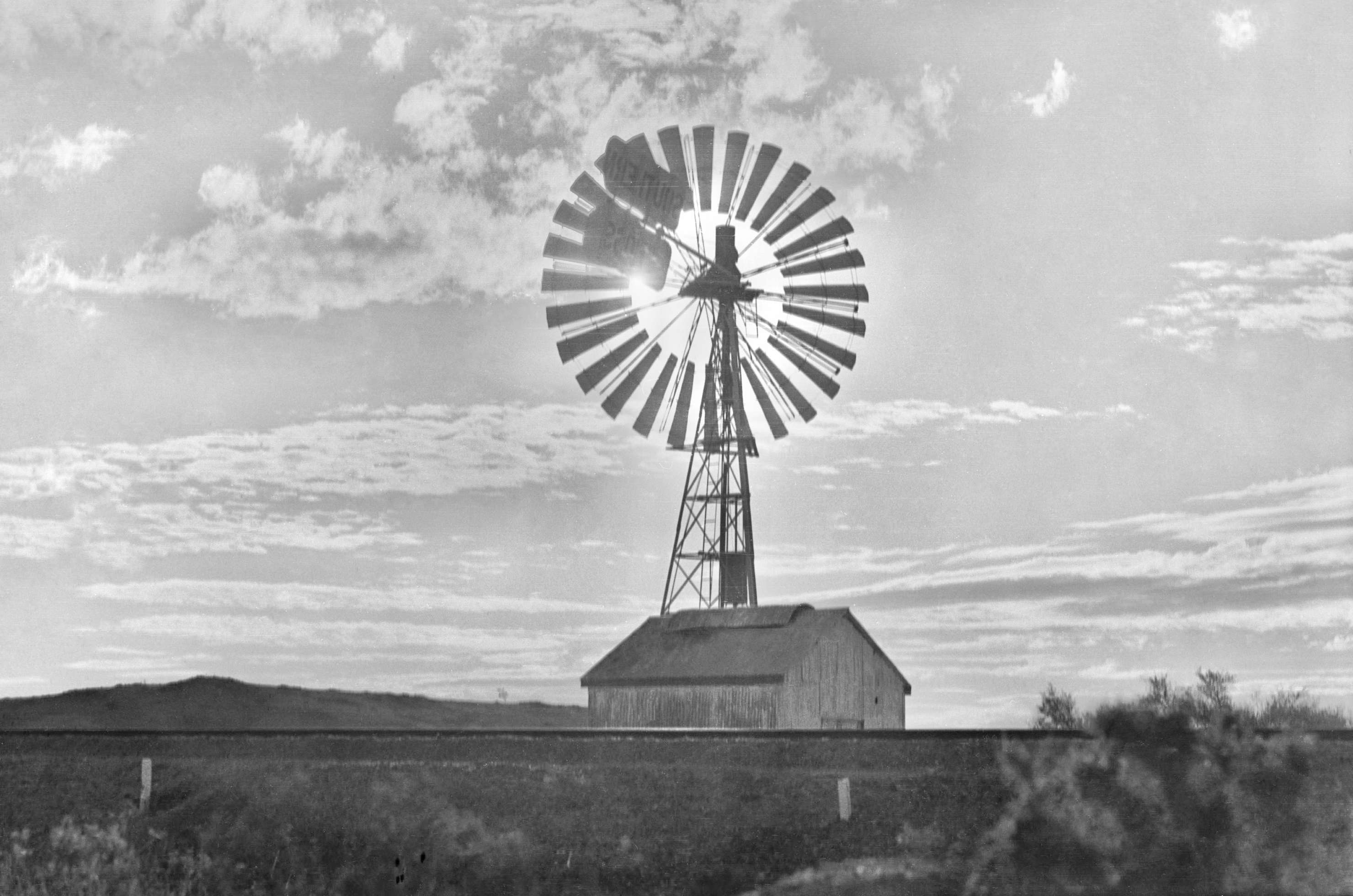
This windmill supplied water to the large railways dam at Beltana – a vital source of water for the Central Australia Railway during the era of steam locomotives

=== Smith of Dunesk Mission ===
The Smith of Dunesk Mission, of the Presbyterian Church of South Australia, was founded in 1894 funded by a gift by Scotswoman Henrietta Smith (1782–1871) of Lasswade, near Edinburgh, made with the benefit of the Aboriginal people of South Australia particularly in view. Social reformer Phyllis Duguid wrote a pamphlet called A brief account of the Smith of Dunesk Bequest about the bequest in 1937, comprising property in South Australia, Charles Duguid later wrote a letter to The Advertiser in 1948 which gives some details of the bequest, including that attempts had been made to divert the money from Aboriginals, and that three-quarters of the proceeds were to be used for the work of the Presbyterian Church among the aborigines at Ernabella. He wrote that "Mrs. Smith made it clear in 1838, 1857 and 1871 that while aborigines remained in South Australia, her bequest was for their uplift and development.

The first Presbyterian manse was purchased in 1898, having been rented by Rev Robert Mitchell for four years before that, and served as the manse subsequent missioners including for Reverend John Flynn, later of the Australian Inland Mission and the Flying Doctor Service, in 1911. It became the Beltana Australian Inland Mission nursing home in 1919. The nursing home continued until hospital facilities became available in the mid-1950s at Leigh Creek. The second Presbyterian manse, on Lot 93 at the corner of Second and Fourth Street, was purchased in 1912 and held by the church until 1953.

Missioners were to be ordained ministers, but several who served were not. The Smith of Dunesk missioners until the Mission was absorbed into the AIM as the Southern Patrol in 1933 were:

- Rev Robert Mitchell [1851–1929] (October 1894 – November 1898)
- Rev James B. Smellie [1854–1911] (November 1898 – September 1901)
- D.Nicol (October 1901 – May 1902, temporary)
- Rev John Bentley Reid [1842–1910] (June 1902 – May 1905)
- Rev F.W.Rolland, MA [1878–1965] (August 1905 – September 1908)
- Rev Ernest E. Baldwin [1875–1938] (September 1908 – November 1910)
- Rev John Flynn [1880–1951] (January 1911 – May 1912)
- A.H. Bryson (13 July – 18 September 1912, temporary)
- R. Bruce Plowman [1886–1966] (November 1912 – December 1913)
- Rev J.A.Pawson [1885–1961] (February 1914 – December 1915)
- Rev H.E.Carey [1881–1955] (February 1916 – December 1918)
- Rev John Armour [1889–1954] (January 1919 – January 1920)
- D.E. Sprigg (June 1920 – November 1920)
- Rev M.S.Campbell [1890–1968] (December 1920 – December 1921)
- Rev William Gray [1854–1937] (July 1923 – February 1928)
- Rev Robert Mitchell [1851–1929] (April 1928 – December 1928)
- Robert Walter Casboult [1863–1932] (April 1929 – January 1932)

Rev Fred H. Patterson (1888–1944) supplied part-time in 1932 while minister of Port Augusta. From the beginning of 1933 the Mission was absorbed into the Southern Patrol of the Australian Inland Mission with Patterson padre 1933–40.

The Beltana Mission Hall, which dates from 1878 or 1879 was described as Doig's Assembly Room in the Northern Argus of 25 April 1879, which suggests that it was not a carriage showroom adjunct to Doig's adjoining blacksmith premises as frequently stated, but was built for community purposes. It was built on the corner of Lot 18 which had been purchased by John James Doig in 1877. There were double doors towards the rear of the north-east wall of the main room and a rear room with chimney and separate access. There was a quadrille dance there in April 1879, the Local Court hired it for its sittings and Mrs Anna Doig conducted a Sunday School in it for many years. Doig offered the building and the corner piece of his land to the Church in 1902 for £60 and it was duly purchased. The first service was held on 8 March 1903 led by Rev J.B.Smellie who renovated it to suit. An extra room accessed through the former double doors was added when the building was thoroughly renovated and the exterior rendered in 1918 during the term of Rev H.E. Carey. The extension was removed in 1955 when AIM Patrol Padre 1949-57 Vic Murrell lived in Beltana in the original manse. The building has been kept in fair condition and with much local and other support was put in good order for the commemoration of the founding of the Australian Inland Mission held there 6/7 October 2012.

=== Police station ===
Due to concerns over the behaviour of workers on the railway line a mounted policeman was appointed in 1879 to manage the land from Parachilna to Kopperamanna. In 1881 a permanent police building was finished and a police sergeant with two mounted constables were housed. Cyril Allen, Beltana's last official policeman, closed the office in 1958 with policing now covered from Leigh Creek.

=== School ===
With the closure of the Sliding Rock mine, its school (at the mining township of Cadnia) was dismantled and relocated to Beltana in 1878. A new single room stone building was completed in October 1893 and the original galvanised iron school was converted into a teacher's residence. In 1925 the original school was dismantled and materials were used to add a shelter shed and woodwork room to the new building. It was closed in 1967; then students bused daily to Leigh Creek area school 40 kilometres (25 miles) away. The school had a peak enrolment of 52 students in 1904; it was always a single-teacher school.

=== The Overland Telegraph station (1872–1956) ===
A temporary repeater station on the Overland Telegraph Line was opened in 1872 at Beltana, although the line was established there in 1871, with the first message sent in July 1871. A permanent station was built there in 1875. Operated by a staff of up to six it relayed morse telegraph messages on the Port Darwin-Adelaide telegraph lines. The station received its first phone message in 1878, was moved in 1940 to a telephone switchboard at the local shop, and closed by 1956 as an automatic exchange had been installed. The building is still standing today as a private residence.

=== Railway station ===
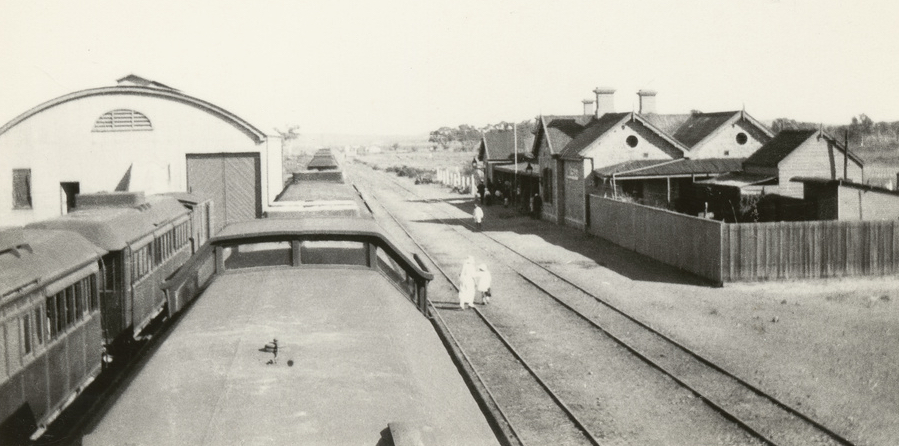
Beltana was a significant station on the Central Australia Railway, where locomotives were watered and crews changed

From 1881 to 1957, the one constant in the life of the township was the 1067 mm (3 ft 6 in) narrow-gauge railway. Originally known as the Port Augusta to Government Gums Railway, then the Great Northern Railway, it was finally named the Central Australia Railway when it reached Alice Springs in August 1929, 51 years after construction had started from the port. The railway had been expected eventually to traverse the continent from south to north, although that ambition was only achieved in 2004, by a separate railway. Locomotives were watered and crews changed and rested at Beltana, and it became a significant station, especially during the surge in traffic during the Second World War when troops and supplies were moved north.

With ever-increasing demand for coal boosting traffic on the now decrepit railway to as many as 17 coal trains a week in each direction – and a further 11 when seasonal cattle trains from Marree were operated – the Commonwealth Railways, in 1957, opened a heavy-haul, 1435 mm (4 ft 8 1/2 in) standard-gauge line from Port Augusta to Marree, north of Beltana. Built to handle coal traffic from the Leigh Creek coalfield and seasonal cattle from Marree, the line bypassed Beltana by several kilometres. All narrow-gauge traffic south of Marree, including The Ghan passenger train, ceased on the narrow gauge. In 1981, the track was lifted and most infrastructure on the line was demolished. However, the main station building and freight shed at Beltana were retained and are in private ownership.
