= Playford A Power Station =

Former power station and dam in South Australia

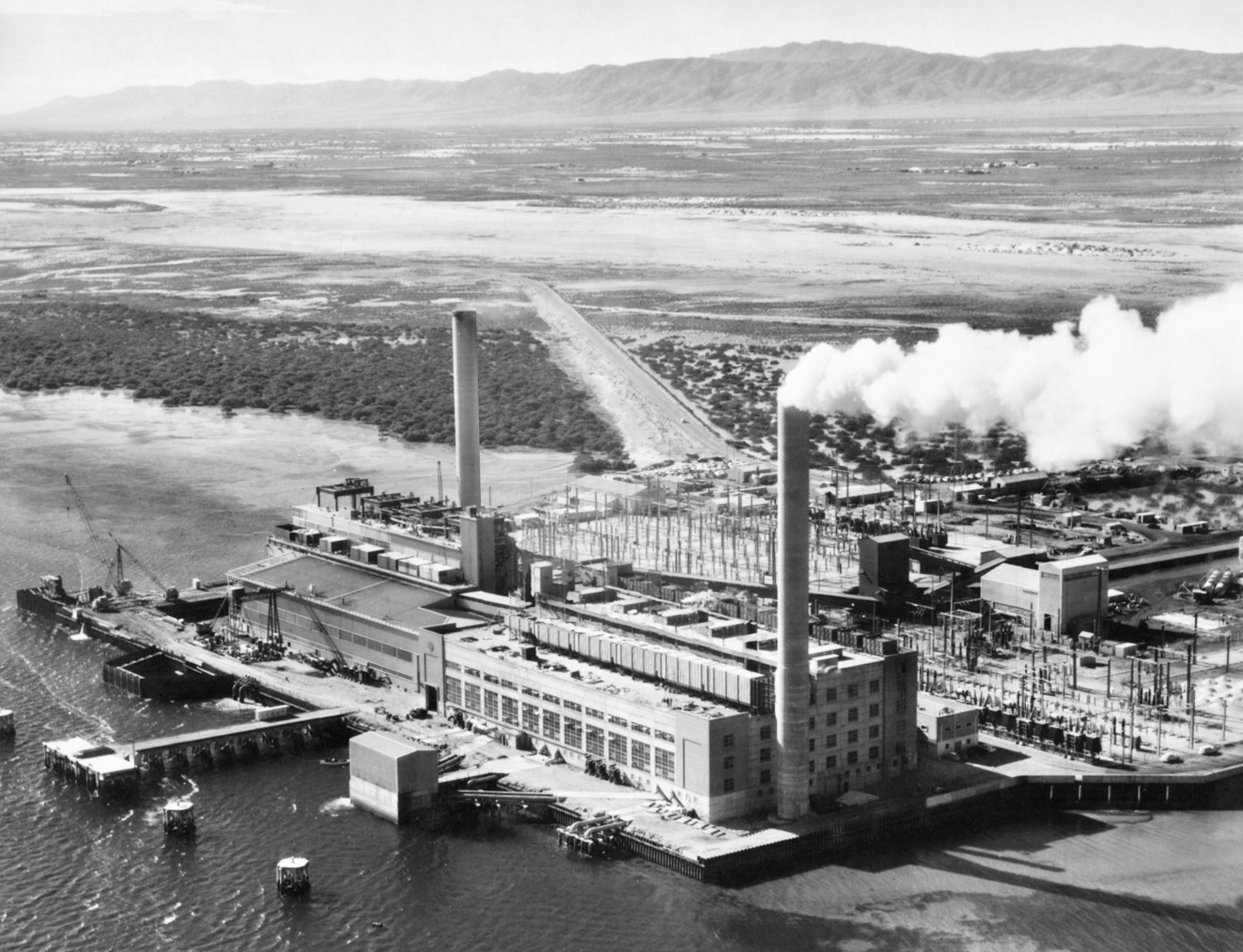
- Country: Australia
- Location: Port Paterson, South Australia
- Coordinates: 32°32′20″S 137°46′55″E
- Status: Decommissioned
- Commission date: 1954-1957
- Decommission date: 1985
- Construction cost: A£10 million
- Operator: Electricity Trust of South Australia

Thermal power station
- Primary fuel: Sub-bituminous coal
- Turbine technology: Steam turbine
- Chimneys: 1

Power generation
- Nameplate capacity: 90 MW

The Playford A Power Station was the first thermal power station that was built by the Electricity Trust of South Australia, located at Port Paterson, South Australia near Port Augusta. It was built in 1954 to generate electricity from sub-bituminous coal mined from the Telford Cut at Leigh Creek and transported 250 kilometres (160 mi) by rail.

The Playford B Power Station was established nearby in 1963, and the Northern Power Station in 1985. All three facilities were decommissioned during the 1980s and demolished in 2018.

== Overview ==
The first unit of the power station was opened by Governor Robert George on 23 July 1954. It was the first power station in South Australia which did not require the importation of fuel from interstate. It was expected to take a few years before all six units were operational. The life of Playford A and B stations was expected to be 30 years, the supply of coal then known to be available from Leigh Creek. Playford A was decommissioned in 1985, however the building remained until all three power stations were demolished in 2018.

Flinders Power, a division of Alinta Energy, contracted out the demolition of all three power stations and remediating the site. The demolition and 1,068-hectare (2,640-acre) site rehabilitation was completed in May 2019.
