= Copley, South Australia =

Copley South Australia
- Coordinates: 30°32′S 138°26′E
- Population: 83 (SAL 2021)
- Established: 1891
- Postcode(s): 5732
- Elevation: 237 m (778 ft)
- Time zone: ACST (UTC+9:30)
  - Summer (DST): ACST (UTC+10:30)
- Location: 5 km (3 mi) northeast of Leigh Creek; 265 km (165 mi) north of Port Augusta; 540 km (336 mi) north of Adelaide
- LGA(s): Pastoral Unincorporated Area
- Region: Far North
- State electorate(s): Stuart
- Federal division(s): Grey
Mean max temp	Mean min temp	Annual rainfall
26.3 °C; 79 °F	12.8 °C; 55 °F	230.1 mm 9.1 in
Localities around Copley:
Myrtle Springs	Leigh Creek Station	Leigh Creek Station
Myrtle Springs	Copley	Leigh Creek Station
Leigh Creek	Leigh Creek; North Moolooloo	North Moolooloo
- Footnotes: Climate; Adjoining localities

Copley is a town in the Australian state of South Australia.

The township adjacent to Leigh Creek Railway Station was officially dedicated as the Town of Copley by a proclamation published on 27 August 1891. The name honours William Copley, who at the time the town was proclaimed was a member of the Legislative Council for the Northern District.

According to Rodney Cockburn (in his Nomenclature of South Australia) the name Leigh Creek for the railway station and post office "was officially abandoned in 1916 on the advice of the Nomenclature Committee, who acted upon the suggestion of Lachlan McTaggart of Wooltana Station The Committee pointed out that it was most undesirable to have a town of one designation and a railway station and post office of another. The name Leigh Creek had no legal status by way of dedication, while the town of Copley was proclaimed under the Crown Lands Act and there were many sound reasons why the latter appellative should be adopted for all Government purposes. It seemed absurd to have a name wholly foreign to the title deeds used for the post office and railway station. At a public meeting the residents protested vigorously against the change.

Copley is located within the federal division of Grey, the state electoral district of Stuart and the Pastoral Unincorporated Area of South Australia. As of 2016, the community within Copley received municipal services from a South Australian government agency, the Outback Communities Authority.

== Sources ==
Extract entitled "Copley, A Potted History" Commemorating Copley's Centenary 1891–1991. On one side is a map, Portion D.BP.10, Roads Book
