= Essential Services Commission =

Essential Services Commission may refer to:

- Essential Services Commission (Victoria), commission of the Government of Victoria, Australia
- Essential Services Commission of South Australia, commission of the Government of South Australia
