= Puttapa =

Pastoral lease in South Australia

Coordinates: 30.80235°S 138.48734°E

Location in South Australia

Puttapa or Puttapa Station is a pastoral lease that operates as a sheep station, located in the Flinders Ranges region of South Australia, to the south of Leigh Creek. There are heritage-listed sites of considerable significance on the property, in particular the Ajax Mine Fossil Reef, which is under consideration for UNESCO World Heritage status.

== History ==
The area that is covered by Puttapa was once part of a much larger lease taken up by John Haimes in 1854, which eventually became Beltana Station. The area was known as the Puttapa paddock and was eventually sold to Steven Lock in 1911 and became Puttapa Station.

Len Ragless purchased the lease in 1936, and it remained in the Ragless family until it was put on the market in early 2025 by Len's grandson, Graham Ragless. The property has kept some cattle in the past, and harvested feral goats, but it has been primarily a sheep station. It transitioned from Merino sheep, bred mainly for their wool, to Dorpers and Australian White sheep, which are bred for their meat.

The land occupying the extent of the Puttapa pastoral lease was gazetted by the Government of South Australia as a locality in April 2013 under the name Puttapa.

The property was sold in May 2025.

== Description ==
Puttapa Station is a pastoral lease run as a sheep station, located around to the north of the historic town of Beltana and south of Leigh Creek, South Australia. The property covers 31,000 ha (77,000 acres) and is primarily grazing land.

It also has tourist facilities, in the form of converted shearers' quarters and tracks for motorbikes and four-wheel drives.

== Heritage listings ==
As of August 2025, Puttapa Station contains the following heritage-listed sites:

- Ajax Mine Fossil Reef was listed as a State Heritage Place in the SA Heritage Register on 28 August 2014, as a designated place of palaeontological and geological significance. As of 2022 Puttapa is the location of one of seven sites in the Flinders Ranges under consideration for UNESCO World Heritage status, listed as Ajax Hill.
- Copper King Copper and Ochre Mine was listed as a State Heritage Place in the SA Heritage Register on 23 November 1989 for its significance as a mine, being one of four major European (non-Indigenous) coloured pigment sites in South Australia, reflecting the transition from copper to pigment production around 1900.

== See also ==
- List of ranches and stations
