= Aalborg CSP =

Danish renewable energy company

- Company type: Public limited company
- Industry: Concentrating solar power technology and engineering
- Founded: January 1, 2011 (15 years ago)
- Headquarters: Aalborg, Denmark
- Key people: Svante Bundgaard, Peter Badstue Jensen and Sergio de la Huerga Menéndez
- Products: Steam generators, steam boilers, solar boilers, solar district heating, industrial solar technologies, integrated energy systems
- Website: www.aalborgcsp.com

Aalborg CSP is a Danish renewable energy specialist mainly designing solutions based on concentrated solar power (CSP) technology. The company's main office is located in, Aalborg, Denmark, and they have offices in Spain, the United States, Kenya, Australia and Indonesia. Aalborg CSP has participated in projects mainly in Spain, but also in Turkey, Norway and Russia. The most current project as of 2015 is an integrated energy system located in Port Augusta, Australia. Aalborg CSP has partnered with Sundrop Farms to create a farm powered by the sun and saltwater. By using desalination, powered by the sun, it is possible to produce the water with desalinated seawater. Aalborg CSP was in 2010 given the Gazelle Award, where companies must have had a doubling of either revenue or profit in the last four years. Aalborg CSP has 56 people employed.

== History ==
Aalborg CSP is the result of the merger between BK Aalborg and BK Engineering, which took place on January 1, 2011. These are companies with roots back to the 1980s where they originate from the boiler industry of which the city of Aalborg has become synonymous.

== CSP ==
It is especially the work within the CSP industry that has put Aalborg CSP on the map. With their work on CSP plants around the world, the company has become a leading global player within steam generators for large-scale concentrated solar power plants. Among other projects the company has contributed to the construction of large CSP plants in Spain. One of these plants were at the time considered to be the world's most powerful solar tower.
