= Sundrop Farms =

Solar thermal power plant with hydroponic greenhouse system

Sundrop Farms is a developer, owner and operator of high tech greenhouse facilities which grow crops using methods which reduce reliance on finite natural resources when compared to conventional greenhouse production. Sundrop Farms opened its first pilot facility in Port Augusta, South Australia, in 2010, operating as Seawater Greenhouse Australia Pty Ltd. This facility was originally designed as a Seawater Greenhouse.

Significant technology changes led to the Sundrop System, and the dissolution of the joint venture with Seawater Greenhouse Ltd. In 2016, Sundrop Farms commissioned an expanded 20 ha facility south of Port Augusta. Sundrop Farms has offices in London, UK and Adelaide, Australia. In October 2016, Sundrop Farms was operating greenhouses in Portugal, the United States and had another facility planned in Australia.

== Sundrop system ==
The primary inputs to a greenhouse are heat, electricity, water, and nutrients. The Sundrop System is a collection of technologies which, when used in combination, reduce the need for finite resources in these inputs versus conventional greenhouse production. In Sundrop Farms’ first facilities in South Australia, these technologies include concentrated solar power, thermal desalination, and steam-driven electricity generation. This is the first combined heat, power, and water system powered by solar energy for greenhouse production.

== Commercial expansion in Australia ==
Sundrop Farms
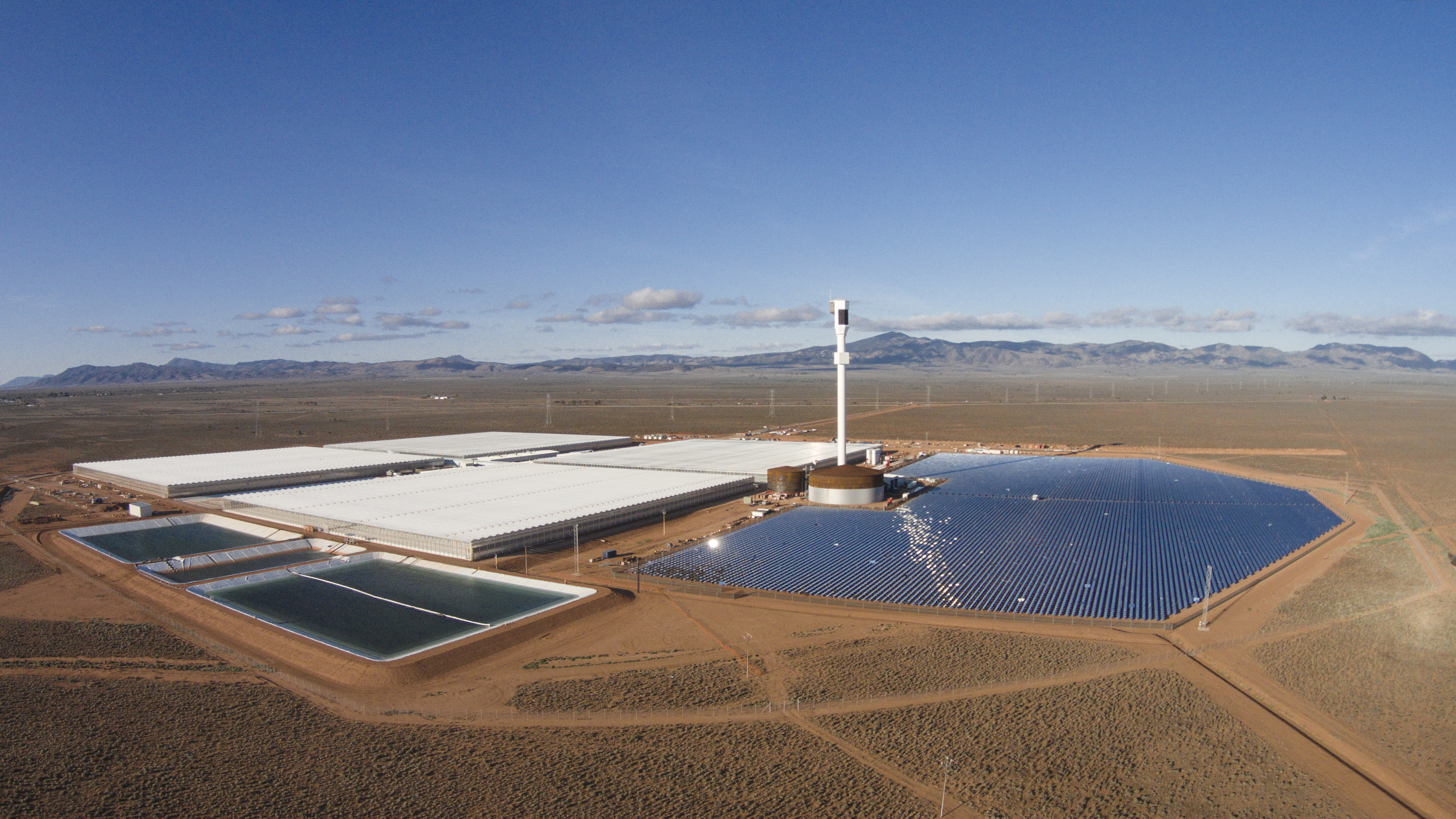
- The 20 hectare expansion project, Port Augusta, South Australia
- Country: Australia
- Location: Port Paterson, South Australia
- Coordinates: 32°32′51.4″S 137°50′48.1″E
- Status: Operational
- Construction began: 2016
- Owner: Sundrop Farms
- Operator: Sundrop Farms

Solar farm
- Type: CSP
- CSP technology: Solar power tower
- Total collector area: 51,500 square metres (554,000 sq ft)

Power generation
- Nameplate capacity: 1.5MWe

External links
- Website: www.sundropfarms.com
- Commons: Related media on Commons

In 2015, Sundrop Farms constructed a 20 hectare solar-powered greenhouse facility near its original site, south of Port Augusta in South Australia. This facility, completed in 2016, produces over 15,000 tonnes of truss tomatoes (on the vine) each year to supply the Australian supermarket operator Coles under a ten-year contract.

Sundrop Farms operations are primarily powered by a concentrated solar thermal power plant and seawater withdrawn from Spencer Gulf and desalinated to feed produce. The project was expected to generate around 100 jobs during the construction of the greenhouse facility (in 2015) and approximately 200 jobs once operational. In 2014, private equity firm Kohlberg Kravis Roberts invested $100 million in the company.

The development was supported by the Government of South Australia which provided approximately $6 million in grant funding. In 2014, a $150 million development contract was awarded to John Holland to construct the expanded facility over an 18-24 month time-frame The total project cost is an estimated $205 million.

The $175 million, highly productive "farm" opened in June 2016 and produces 10-15 per cent of Australia's truss tomatoes to Coles. In May 2019, it was sold to Morrison and Co. It employs 300 people.

=== Concentrated solar power ===
Sundrop Farms' 20 hectare expanded facility is powered by an Integrated Energy System based on the concentrated solar power (CSP) technology. The system is designed and delivered by Danish renewable energy specialist, Aalborg CSP, and it is the first large-scale CSP-based technology in the world to provide multiple energy streams – heating, fresh water and electricity – for horticultural activities.

The 51,500 m^{2} solar field comprises eSolar’s Solar Collector System. Commissioned in October 2016, the facility's concentrated solar thermal plant peak heat production rate is 39 MW, and desalinates water while producing 1.5 MWe of electricity.

=== Desalination plant ===
Sundrop Farms' original pilot facility desalinated seawater but did not return waste brine to Spencer Gulf. The brine was collected in ponds from which salt could be harvested. The company's brine management plan changed with its 20 hectare expansion in 2014.

Sundrop Farms sought and received approval from the South Australian Environment Protection Authority to discharge waste brine into Spencer Gulf at a salinity of 60 parts per thousand. The expanded facility discharges its brine into the cooling water outflow channel previously used by the coal-fired Port Augusta power stations.

Environmental approval from the Commonwealth Government via referral under the EPBC Act was not required of or sought by Sundrop Farms for this project. Sundrop Farms continues to investigate commercially viable solutions for the recovery of minerals from brine at a large scale.

=== Government support ===
In addition to receiving government financial support, the firm was endorsed by South Australian Premier Jay Weatherill and several South Australian ministers, including Geoff Brock and Gail Gago. Sundrop Farms' former chairman David Travers was employed in the South Australian public sector as the Deputy Agent General for South Australia in London when he received the firm's initial proposal.

The Clean Energy Finance Corporation was an early supporter of the project, committing as a cornerstone debt financier. CEO Philipp Saumweber described the CEFC's commitment as invaluable in enabling the company to subsequently negotiate growth capital funding from global investment firm Kohlberg Kravis Roberts (KKR).

== See also ==
- Gardening in Australia
