= NeuRizer =

Australian publicly-listed mining company

- Formerly: Marathon Resources; Leigh Creek Energy
- Traded as: ASX: NRZ
- Industry: Mining
- Headquarters: Adelaide, South Australia
- Key people: Justyn Peters (Executive Chairman)
- Website: neurizer.com.au

NeuRizer Limited, formerly Leigh Creek Energy and Marathon Resources, is an Australian listed public company which is developing an in-situ coal gasification (ISG) project at Leigh Creek, South Australia.

== History ==
In March 2005, Marathon Resources was listed on the Australian Securities Exchange. In August 2015, Marathon Resources was renamed Leigh Creek Energy. In March 2022, Leigh Creek Energy was renamed NeuRizer.

== Projects ==
NeuRizer holds petroleum licences over the Leigh Creek Coalfield, a large coal deposit which spans approximately seven kilometres (four point three miles) at Leigh Creek. The company's flagship Leigh Creek Energy Project intends to produce gas at the site of the former Leigh Creek coal mine and develop a fertiliser production facility using waste gas streams and produce ammonium nitrate fertiliser for use by Australia's farming sector and for export. The project planned to also generate electricity via gas turbines to supply power to the project and Leigh Creek township.

Project planning commenced in 2011, and an exploration license was obtained by the company in November 2014. On 12 April 2018, Leigh Creek Energy received approval for its Statement of Environmental Objectives to run an in-situ coal gasification trial at Leigh Creek. The company successfully ran the pilot project and produced syngas for a period of four months and analysed the sample gas quality. The trial was completed during April 2019 and monitoring of the site commenced over three years to detect environmental concerns.

By 2021, the project was re-engineered primarily focused on the production of urea, as a fertiliser, called the NeuRizer Urea Project (NRUP). The revised project faced community opposition; and by 2024 had stalled as a result of changes to the Environment Protection and Biodiversity Conservation Act 1999 (Cth).
