= Osborne Power Station =

Gas based power plant in South Australia

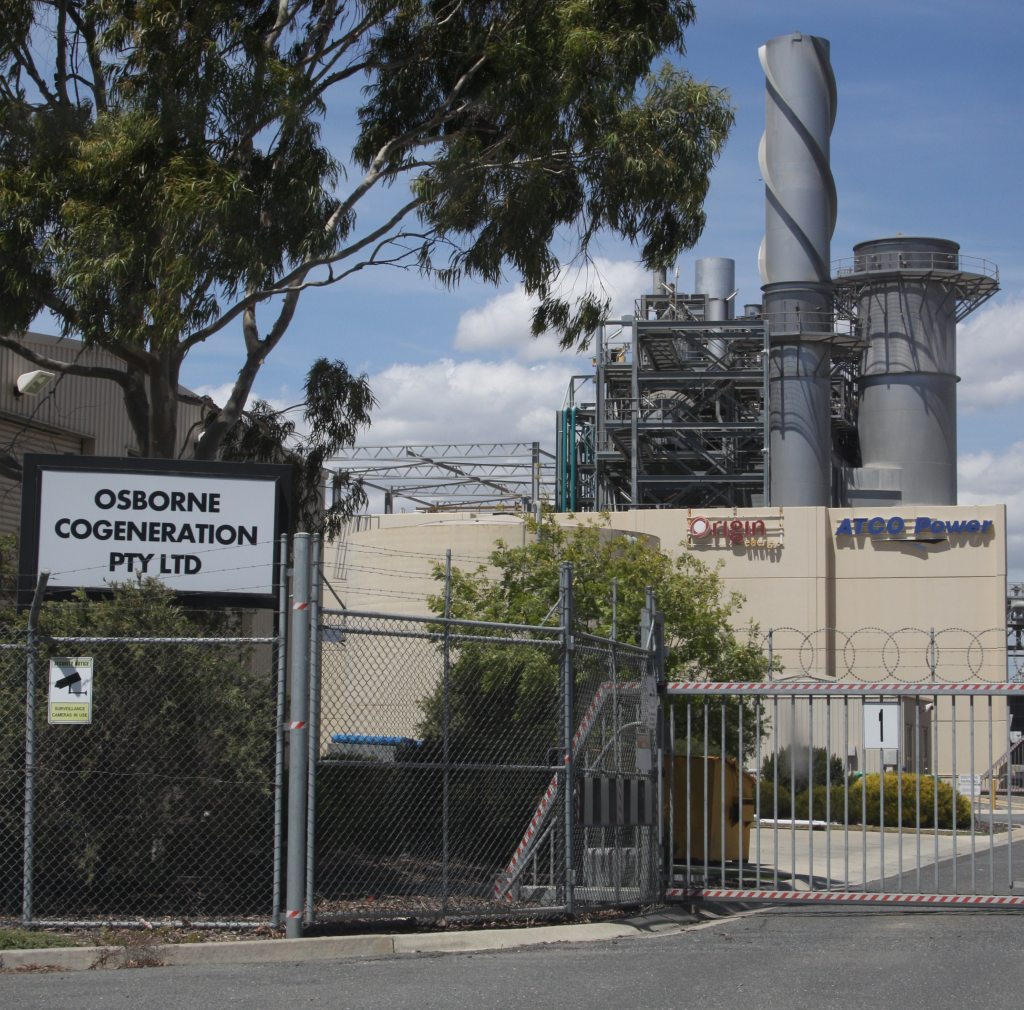
- Country: Australia
- Location: Osborne, South Australia
- Coordinates: 34°47′53″S 138°30′28″E
- Status: Operational
- Commission date: 1998
- Owners: Origin Energy and ATCO
- Operator: Adelaide Electric Supply Company

Thermal power station
- Primary fuel: Natural gas
- Turbine technology: Turbine
- Combined cycle?: Yes
- Cogeneration?: Yes

Power generation
- Units operational: 1
- Nameplate capacity: 180 MW

The Osborne Power Station is located in Osborne, a northwestern suburb of Adelaide, South Australia.

== Current ==
Today's Osborne Power Station is natural gas powered with one gas turbine and one steam turbine that together generate 180 MW of electricity. In addition to the electricity generated, Osborne produces 410 tonnes/hour of steam. Until Penrice closed in 2014, steam was used by Penrice Soda Products, a soda ash producer, making the power station Australia's largest cogeneration facility.

Osborne was commissioned in 1998 with one 120 MW combined cycle gas turbine and one 60 MW steam turbine, using gas from the Cooper Basin. It is owned 50% by ATCO and 50% by Origin Energy.

== Former ==
Osborne 'A' Power Station was opened in August 1923 by the Adelaide Electric Supply Company, which leased 24 acres of swamp land from the Harbors Board for an 84-year term. The boilers in this power station used black coal imported from New South Wales, but were later modified to burn the poorer quality Leigh Creek, South Australia coal. The Adelaide Electric Supply Company was later nationalised to become the Electricity Trust of South Australia.

Work on the Osborne 'B' Power Station on the same site started in 1947 and was completed soon after. The plant was decommissioned in 1989–90, and demolished from 1998.
