= Cairn Hill mine =

Iron and copper mine in South Australia

- Location within Australia Location within South Australia
- Location: South Australia, Australia; 29°17′51″S 135°07′03″E
- Products: Iron ore, copper
- Opened: 2010
- Active: 2010–2014, 2016–2017
- Company: Cu-River Mining

Cairn Hill mine is an iron ore mine formerly operated by IMX Resources and now by Cu-River Mining. It is located 55 km south-east of Coober Pedy in South Australia and produced 1.8Mtpa of a unique coarse-grained magnetite-copper DSO (Direct Shipping Ore) product. The product was mined and crushed on site before being trucked and railed to Port Adelaide, where it was then shipped to China. Cairn Hill was a joint venture between IMX Resources (51%) and Sichuan Taifeng (49%).

The Cairn Hill Mining Operation was commissioned in May 2010 and commenced production in December 2010.

From Cairn Hill, ore was trucked 58 km to the Rankin Dam rail siding on the Adelaide–Darwin railway, where it was loaded into specially designed open-top containers on a train for the 879 km journey to Port Adelaide. Next, the ore was stockpiled in containers, then loaded directly onto the ship through a rotating containerised ore loading facility. Cairn Hill supplied enough ore for two full shipments of 75,000 tonnes (a single Panamax class vessel per shipment) per month. Cairn Hill ore was sold to China where its relatively high copper value and the soft, coarse grained quality of the ore made it highly desirable to a range of customers.

In July 2013, the Cairn Hill Mining Operation reached a milestone of 4,000,000 tonnes of iron ore exported.

In November 2013, IMX investigated ways to extend the life of the mine by at least 12 to 15 months, before shifting focus to the Mount Woods Magnetite Project.

Due to low iron ore prices, the Cairn Hill mine was closed in June 2014. The mine was sold to Cu-River Mining in December 2014 and subsequently re-opened. It extracted one million tonnes of ore in the first twelve months.
