= Port Augusta Town Hall =

Town hall in South Australia

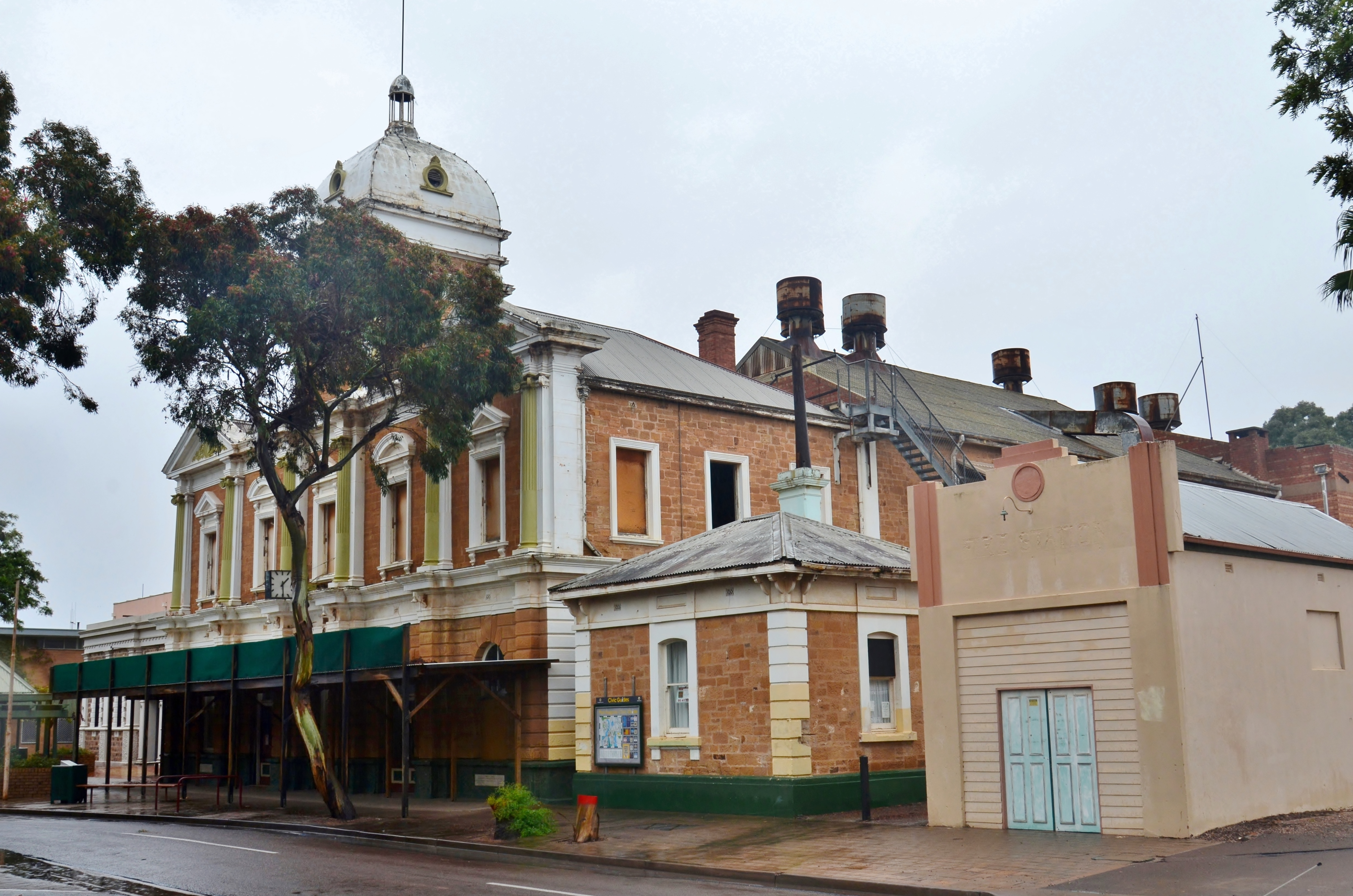
- The Town Hall in 2017
- Location: 54 Commercial Road; Port Augusta SA 5700
- Coordinates: 32°29′31″S 137°45′46″E
- Built: 1886-87
- Architect: Alfred Barham Black and H. E. Hughes
- Governing body: City of Port Augusta

South Australian Heritage Register
- Type: State Heritage Place
- Designated: 23 September 1982
- Reference no.: 16265

Register of the National Estate
- Type: Historic
- Designated: 21 March 1978
- Reference no.: 6917

The Port Augusta Town Hall is a heritage-listed former town hall at 54 Commercial Road, Port Augusta. It was Port Augusta's seat of local government from 1887 to 1983.

== History ==
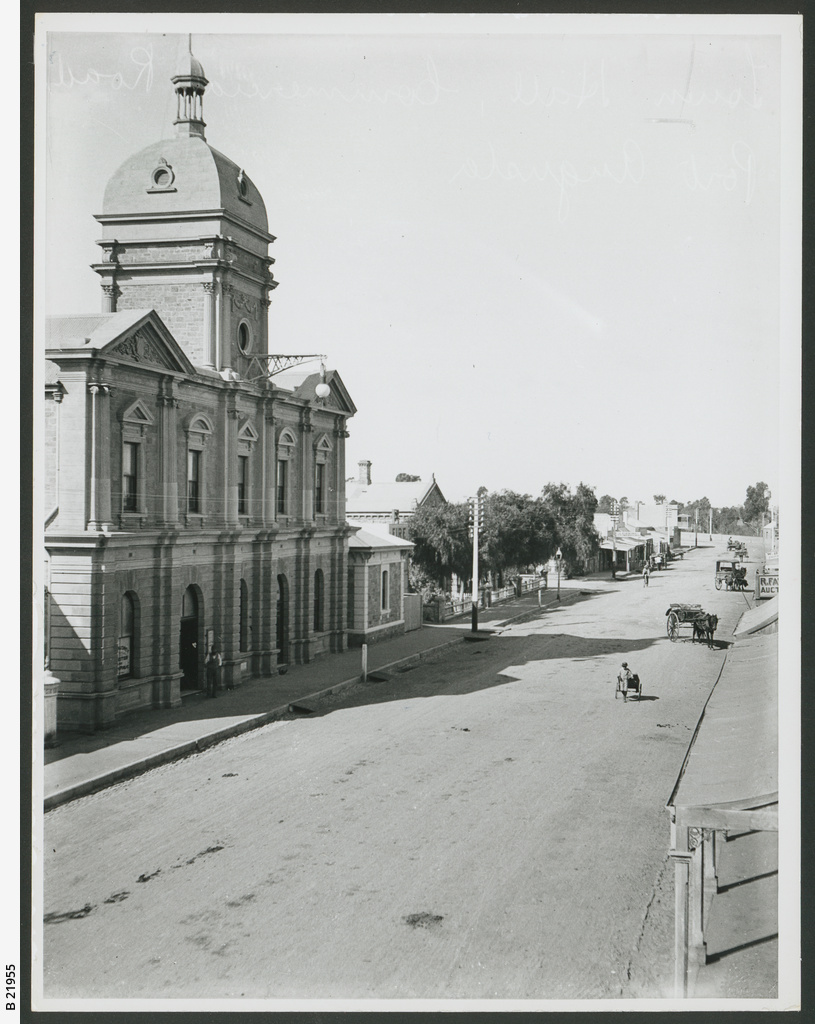
The Town Hall circa 1897

The town hall was built in 1886-87, to a design by Alfred Barham Black and H. E. Hughes. An earlier design by James Hill was condemned by architects. The design featured a large central auditorium, 75 feet by 45 feet with a stage. It was built by R. Honey, from stone quarried at Quorn. The foundation stone was laid in June 1886 by the wife of the mayor, J. C. Knipe. It was opened in May 1887 by Knipe's successor as mayor, David Drysdale.

The building was severely damaged by fire in 1944, with the main hall, gallery, mayor's parlour, supper room, stage, dressing and cloak rooms, and mothers' and babies' association all destroyed. The facade, council chamber and town council office were saved. It suffered a further wall collapse while being used as an open-air entertainment venue in 1945 while awaiting reconstruction. It was rebuilt in 1946 at a cost of £30,000, and opened in August by Governor Willoughby Norrie. The original facade was retained as part of the rebuilt town hall.

It was added to the South Australian Heritage Register in September 1982. It was also listed on the now-defunct Register of the National Estate.

In 1983, the City of Port Augusta vacated the building when the new Port Augusta Civic Centre was completed. It was used by community groups for many years. Much of the building remained disused and it became increasingly derelict over time. In 2007, a teenage boy was injured after falling through the building's roof.

In June 2015, it was placed up for sale by the state government. It was reported the previous month that the community tenants had been given one month's notice. At that time, the building was reported to have structural problems, including issues with asbestos and "substantial cracking in the walls due to movement of the original footing". It had previously been reported to have problems with subsiding side walls and a crumbling facade, which had necessitated the erection of a verandah to protect pedestrians.

Local state Liberal MP Dan van Holst Pellekaan has supported removing the heritage listing from all of the site except the facade, supporting retaining only the facade of the town hall amidst a general redevelopment of the site. It was reported in March 2016 that contracts for the sale of the building had been signed, with the contract to require development within two years of purchase. That settlement had not yet occurred. As of 2019, the building had been partially renovated by new owners Gulf Group. The Port Augusta Boxing Club returning to a renovated space in the building, with a wider masterplan still in negotiation.
