= Electricity Supply Industry Planning Council =

The Electricity Supply Industry Planning Council (ESIPC) was a South Australian government agency responsible for the effective operation of the electricity industry in South Australia. According to a statement on its website, the agency was established "to provide expert, independent advice to the South Australian Government and the Essential Services Commission of South Australia (ESCOSA) in relation to the state of the electricity supply industry in South Australia."

From 1 July 2009, ESIPC was amalgamated into the Australian Energy Market Operator.

== History ==
In December 1996, the Parliament of South Australia passed the Electricity Act 1996, a bill intended to put certain regulations on the electricity supply industry. The primary function of this act was to establish a planning council which would advise ESCOSA on the electricity industry. ESIPC was officially established in 1999, and it began operating in July 2000.

== Key responsibilities ==
According to Electricity Act 1996, ESIPC's key functions were:

- to develop overall electricity load forecasts; to review and report to the Minister and the Essential Services Commission of South Australia (ESCOSA) on the performance of the South Australian power system;
- to advise the Minister and the ESCOSA on matters relating to the future capacity and reliability;
- to prepare or review proposals for significant projects relating to the transmission network in South Australia;
- to advise the Minister and the ESCOSA, either on its own initiative or at the request of the Minister or the ESCOSA, on other electricity supply industry and market policy matters;
- to publish an annual review of the performance, future capacity and reliability of the South Australian power system;
- to carry out any functions appointed to the Planning Council under the National Electricity Code;
- to publish from time to time such information relating to the matters referred to above as the Planning Council considers appropriate;
- to perform any other function prescribed by regulation or assigned by or under any other Act.
