= Indiana Resources =

- Type: Public
- Traded as: ASX: IDA
- Industry: Mineral exploration
- Predecessor: IMX Resources
- Headquarters: Perth, Western Australia, Australia
- Website: indianaresources.com.au

Indiana Resources (formerly IMX Resources until 22 June 2016) is a dual-listed iron ore mining and base and precious metals exploration company based in Perth, Western Australia. The company was first listed on the Australian Stock Exchange on 17 August 1994. It changed its name to Indiana Resources Limited in 2016. When IMX's now-closed Cairn Hill mine commenced production in 2010 it became the first new South Australian iron ore mine in over a century. IMX was also the first Australian iron ore company to operate the rotainer bulk export system, which is now in use at a number of other sites around the country.

== Cairn Hill Mining Operation ==
IMX operated the Cairn Hill iron ore mine, located 55 km from Coober Pedy in South Australia. The product was shipped to China. Cairn Hill was a joint venture between IMX Resources (51%) and Sichuan Taifeng (49%).

The Cairn Hill Mining Operation was commissioned in May 2010 and commenced production in December 2010. It was closed in 2014. IMX shifted its focus to the Mount Woods Magnetite Project.

== Nachingwea Regional Exploration Project ==
IMX owns and operates the highly prospective Nachingwea Regional Exploration Project in south-east Tanzania, which includes the Ntaka Hill Nickel Sulphide Project. Nachingwea is a large tenement package, located approximately 200 kilometres from the port of Mtwara, with the potential to host multiple mineralised systems. Recent exploration has proven occurrences of high-grade and disseminated nickel and copper sulphides, gold and graphite.

== Mount Woods Magnetite Project, South Australia ==
IMX is actively exploring its Mt Woods Magnetite Project in South Australia, where it has identified the Snaefell Magnetite Deposit and a number of other substantial magnetite exploration targets. IMX is seeking to develop a 1.8-3.5Mtpa mining project at Snaefell utilising infrastructure from the now-closed Cairn Hill mine, and is presently seeking a cornerstone investor willing to fund the project development costs. IMX retains a pipeline of strategic investments and a portfolio of base and precious metal exploration assets in Australia and southern Africa.
