= Telford Cut =

Former mine in South Australia

- Location within South Australia Location within Australia
- Location: Leigh Creek, South Australia, Australia; 30°29′00″S 138°25′00″E
- Products: sub-bituminous coal
- Opened: 1943
- Closed: 2015
- Company: Electricity Trust of South Australia (1948–1999); Alinta Energy (1999?–2015)

Telford Cut was an open-cut coal mine, now closed, in the Leigh Creek Coalfield in South Australia. For the 72 years between its opening in 1943 and its closure, the mine supplied sub-bituminous coal to fire power stations first in Adelaide then, from 1954, Port Augusta. Production ceased in November 2015 but stockpiled product was transported to Port Augusta until the last power station closed down in May 2016.

== Coal mine ==
The open cut mine operation extracted low-grade, sub-bituminous coal that was transported 250 km by rail to power stations outside Port Augusta on the east side of Spencer Gulf. The coal occurs in several nested bowl-shaped seams, each several metres thick. The coalfield at Leigh Creek was operated at first by the Electricity Trust of South Australia then by Alinta Energy, and produced over 2.5 million tonnes a year of coal. Alinta energy also operated the power stations at Port Augusta; they were the last coal-fired electricity generators in South Australia, and the only users of coal from Leigh Creek.

=== Exploration ===
In 1888, John Henry Reid discovered coal-bearing shale during the sinking of a railway dam in the Leigh Creek area (Henry Brown, Government Geologist confirmed the find in his visit to Leigh's Creek in February 1889). This discovery led to a geological examination of the area by a government geologist and the establishment of underground workings. No 1 shaft, sunk by the Leigh Creek Coal Mining Company, was abandoned on striking a heavy flow of water. A new shaft was sunk in 1892 but only small quantities of coal were extracted for experimental purposes and operations ceased in 1894.

=== Development ===
It was not until 1940 when coal supplies became critically low because of the Second World War that Leigh Creek coal was considered again. The deposits seemed extensive and extracting the coal by open cut methods was considered feasible. Exploratory boring started in 1941 and plans were made to develop the first open cut mine. Excavation started in 1943 under the control of the Engineering & Water Supply Department. It was apparent that the electricity supply industry would be the largest user of Leigh Creek coal so control of the coalfield was transferred to the Electricity Trust of South Australia (ETSA) in 1948.

ETSA ordered boilers capable of burning Leigh Creek coal for the Osborne Power Station near Port Adelaide and, after thorough investigations, decided to establish a power station at Port Augusta to burn Leigh Creek coal exclusively. Playford A Power Station was built in the 1950s, followed by Playford B Power Station in the 1960s. The combined A and B plants, with a total generating capacity of 330 megawatts, were named in recognition of the then South Australian Premier, Sir Thomas Playford.

The use of large excavating machines and efficient mining equipment at Leigh Creek, together with the rebuilding of a railway line between Leigh Creek and Port Augusta by the Commonwealth Railways, resulted in economic production and delivery of coal to the power station. Pacific National provided the coal freight service from 2001.

=== Expansion ===
In the mid 1970s it was decided to build a 500 megawatt station at Port Augusta, called the Northern Power Station. That decision meant enlarging the coalfield using new methods to extract deeper coal, increasing production, building a retention dam to prevent possible flooding of the field and diverting the main highway around the coalfield. The Northern Power Station, alongside Playford A and B, was commissioned in 1985. Because the existing town was located within the coal basin, a new town was built south of the coalfield and the new Leigh Creek became occupied in 1980.

Since the early 1990s, more changes occurred in Leigh Creek. Massive restructuring of mining operations resulted in the reduction of a workforce of over 750 to about 200. The township also became a lot smaller. The population dropped from about 2500 in 1987 to less than 700 today. The loss of residents also resulted in the loss of many services. Whilst most workers at the coalfields make a good income, the high cost of communication and services drastically reduce the disposable income. Schooling at Leigh Creek has become a bigger problem than ever before. Reasonable education is available for younger students in the primary school. For high school students, the meagre subject choice has made education at the Leigh Creek Area School not the ideal option for many students. A simple medical procedure may require a trip to Adelaide, which means a round trip of about 1200 km.

== Rail transport ==
Coal was originally transported by the 1067 mm (3 ft 6 in) narrow gauge Central Australia Railway (CAR) that went in and out of the Flinders Ranges via Hawker (315 metres (1033 feet) above sea level) and Quorn (293 metres (961 feet)). However, this railway was not designed to handle frequent heavy loads. Instead of upgrading the line it was decided to build a heavier, standard-gauge line via the plains to the west of the ranges, which would not incur significantly higher construction costs and would not be subject to washaways. This, the Marree line, from the outskirts of Port Augusta, opened to Telford Cut in May 1956 and to Marree in July 1957; the extension beyond the mine was justified by cattle traffic from Marree.

Although the line was built to handle coal traffic, Marree provided an advantage of moving further north the point at which passengers to and from Alice Springs had to transfer between a modern, air-conditioned train (on the new standard gauge track) and the original Ghan (on the narrow-gauge CAR). The change-of-gauge role ended 23 years later, when the Adelaide–Darwin rail corridor (a standard gauge line) via Alice Springs – routed well to the west of the CAR – was completed in 1980, rendering the CAR redundant.

In 1987, the terminus of the Marree line was pulled back to Telford Cut, where a balloon loop was built to simplify train operations.

The railway ceased operation after the power station closed in May 2016.

== Closure ==
On 11 June 2015, Alinta Energy announced their intent to cease operating the Leigh Creek coal mine beyond March 2018, closing it along with the related Playford B and Northern power stations, and warned that closure would be sooner should business conditions worsen further.

On 30 July 2015, Alinta Energy announced that the closure dates of all three facilities were to be brought forward by 12 months; the company intended not operate the generating plant past March 2017 and could shut it down as early as March 2016. The closure date for the Port Augusta power stations was later delayed until 8 May 2016.

On 7 October 2015, it was confirmed that mining operations would cease on 17 November 2015. After that date, stockpiled coal was railed to Port Augusta until the power station closed in May 2016.

== Remediation ==
Following closure of the mine, Alinta was required to remediate the site that had been mined for over 70 years. An initial priority was to ensure that any remaining coal could not spontaneously ignite. This was achieved by battering the steep mine sides down to shallower angles, and covering any potential coal deposits with at least two metres of inert earth.

=== Reactivation ===
After the closure, an application for underground coal gasification was made for the site. The Adnyamathanha community opposes the project.

== Township ==
The nearby town of Leigh Creek supported the mine during its operation.
