= Northern Power Station (South Australia) =

Power station in Port Paterson, South Australia

- Country: Australia
- Location: Port Paterson, South Australia
- Coordinates: 32.5429°S 137.7874°E
- Status: Demolished
- Commission date: 1985
- Decommission date: May 2016
- Owners: Alinta Energy; Electricity Trust of South Australia
- Operator: Alinta Energy

Thermal power station
- Primary fuel: Coal
- Turbine technology: Steam turbine

Power generation
- Units operational: 0
- Units decommissioned: 2 × 260 MW
- Nameplate capacity: 520 MW

External links
- Website: alintaenergy.com.au/assets/generation/flinders/

Northern Power Station was located at Port Paterson, South Australia about 6 kilometres (3.7 mi) south of the city centre of Port Augusta. It was coal powered with two 260 MW steam turbines that generated a total of 520 MW of electricity. It was operated and maintained by Alinta Energy and was commissioned in 1985. Northern received coal by rail from the Telford Cut coal mine, 280 kilometres (170 mi) to the north. The plant ceased electricity production in May 2016 and decommissioned and demolished over the following few years.

== Emissions ==
=== Air ===
Carbon Monitoring for Action estimated that this power station emitted 3.62 million tonnes of greenhouse gases each year as a result of burning coal. Other air-borne emissions were reported annually to the National Pollution Inventory. As of 2012-13, from greatest to smallest quantity, airborne emissions included: sulfur dioxide, oxides of nitrogen, hydrochloric acid, particulate matter, carbon monoxide, volatile organic compounds, manganese, mercury, chromium, boron, chlorine, zinc, nickel, copper, lead and others.

=== Marine ===
Northern Power Station drew cooling water from Upper Spencer Gulf and returned it to the sea at an elevated temperature. The water was returned 7 °C warmer than the original intake water. The flow rate was 47 m^{3} per second. Its outfall channel is intended to be used by Sundrop Farms to disperse desalination brine from a proposed seawater desalination plant to create freshwater for a greenhouse, expected to be completed in 2016.

Additional marine emissions included (from largest to smallest quantities): boron, fluoride, arsenic, manganese, chromium, nickel and mercury.

== Closure and alternative uses ==
Despite being the lowest marginal cost fossil fuel generator in South Australia, Northern's economic viability was progressively eroded as wind and solar generation increased in South Australia. During the operation of carbon pricing in Australia under the Clean Energy Act, Northern reduced operation to seasonal summer-only operation.

In recent years its long-term future has been subject to much consideration, including life extension and complete replacement. In 2013, Alinta Energy announced that it was investigating developing a new low-grade coal deposit which could extend the working lives of both Northern and adjacent Playford B power stations until the year 2030. Concept level proposals have been discussed for the replacement of the plant with either a gas-fired, a concentrated solar thermal plant or a nuclear power plant.

On 11 June 2015, Alinta Energy announced its intent to permanently close the power station by March 2018, along with the related Playford B Power Station, and the Telford Cut coal mine that supplies them both with fuel. This was updated on 30 July 2015 to bring the closure dates of all three facilities forward by 12 months, with closure to occur between March 2016 and March 2017.

On 7 October 2015, Alinta Energy announced that Northern and Playford B would close around 31 March 2016. Alinta Energy shut off the Northern Power Station on 9 May 2016.

A few months after the shutdown, South Australia experienced a major storm in late September 2016 which damaged electricity distribution infrastructure and tripped out several wind farms and other generators. It resulted in a state-wide blackout for a few hours, and the power was off in some areas for a couple of days. Federal Resources Minister Matt Canavan said large energy users and interstate power operators had discussed the reopening of the Northern Power Station but this was dismissed by the South Australian Government.

The power stations were demolished and the 1068ha site rehabilitated, including saltbush cover over the ash pond. Replanting was completed in May 2019, but challenged by drought. The site was sold to Cu-River Mining to develop a trans-shipping port for iron ore, grain and other commodities.

A 270 MW / 2,160 MWh battery energy storage system is scheduled for the site by 2026.

== Fly ash playa and health concerns ==
With the permanent closure of the Playford and Northern power stations at Port Augusta, dampening flows of water across the adjacent fly ash playa ceased. This allowed the fly ash, which contains crystalline silica, to become airborne. On several occasions in 2016 and 2017, plumes of the fine grey fly ash powder became visible rising from the power station site and blew into the town of Port Augusta, concerning residents and impacting air quality.

In February 2017, topsoil application trials were underway and liquid odour suppressant was being applied periodically to the flyash dam.

Flyash Australia collected, processed and sold flyash from the Northern Power Station. The company, which is a joint venture between Boral and Cement Australia Pty Ltd, delivered flyash directly to its customers or via its distribution centre in Regency Park, Adelaide. It now imports flyash to South Australia.
