= Playford B Power Station =

Former power station in South Australia

- Country: Australia
- Location: Port Paterson, South Australia
- Coordinates: 32°32′20″S 137°46′55″E
- Status: Demolished
- Commission date: 1963
- Decommission date: 2016
- Operator: Alinta Energy

Thermal power station
- Primary fuel: Sub-bituminous coal
- Turbine technology: Steam turbine

Power generation
- Units operational: 0
- Nameplate capacity: 240 MW

External links
- Website: alintaenergy.com.au/wa/about-us/power-generation/flinders

Playford B Power Station was located at Port Paterson, South Australia about 5.5 kilometres (3.4 mi) south of the city centre of Port Augusta. It was coal powered with four 60 MW steam turbines that generated a total of 240 MW of electricity. Playford B received coal by rail from the Telford Cut coal mine, 280 km to the north and drew cooling water from Spencer Gulf, returning it to the sea at an elevated temperature. Commissioned in 1963, it was co-located with the older Playford A Power Station and the larger, newer Northern Power Station. Playford B was mothballed in 2012 and its permanent closure was announced by operator Alinta Energy in October 2015. Prior to being mothballed, it primarily operated in the summer, when electricity demand peaks.

== Emissions ==
=== Air ===
Carbon Monitoring for Action estimates this power station emitted 1.77 million tonnes of greenhouse gases each year as a result of burning coal. The Australian Government announced the introduction of a Carbon Pollution Reduction Scheme commencing in 2010 to help combat climate change. It was expected to impact on emissions from power stations. The National Pollutant Inventory provides details of other pollutant emissions, but, as at 23 November 2008, not CO_{2}.

=== Marine ===
The power station drew seawater from Upper Spencer Gulf for cooling and discharged it back into the Spencer Gulf 6.6 °C warmer than the original intake water temperature. The rate of flow was 14.5 m³ per second. In addition to thermal pollution, other marine discharges include (from greatest to smallest): fluoride, boron, arsenic, manganese, chromium, copper, nickel and mercury.

== Closure ==
The plant was mothballed in 2012 with Alinta Energy citing market conditions. Though not stated explicitly, the primary causes are likely to be flat or declining demand and increasing penetration of renewables such as wind and rooftop solar PV. In the financial year 2012-13, the plant did not generate electricity but was in a status of active storage, on a potential 90-day recall. No emissions were reported to the National Pollution Inventory that year.

With the closure of Playford B imminent, the Australian Government came under pressure from the local community through a community vote and a national campaign to replace Playford and eventually Northern with concentrated solar thermal power generation technology. This campaign brought together diverse groups including the Australian Youth Climate Coalition under the name Repower Port Augusta.

On 11 June 2015, Alinta Energy announced its intent to permanently close the power station by March 2018, along with the related Northern Power Station, and the Leigh Creek coal mine that supplied them both with fuel.

On 30 July 2015, Alinta Energy announced it was bringing the closure dates of all three facilities forward by 12 months, and intended to no longer operate them past March 2017 and could shut them down as early as March 2016.

On 7 October 2015, Alinta Energy announced the permanent closure of Northern and Playford B around 31 March 2016. The closure date was pushed back to 8 May 2016. Demolition of both stations and site remediation work were expected to take 18 to 24 months to complete.

The power stations were demolished and the 1068ha site rehabilitated, including cover over the ash pond. This was completed in May 2019.

== Fly ash playa and health concerns ==
With the permanent closure of the Playford and Northern power stations at Port Augusta, dampening flows of water across the adjacent fly ash playa ceased. This allowed the fly ash, which contains crystalline silica, to become airborne. On several occasions in 2016 and 2017, plumes of the fine grey fly ash powder became visible rising from the power station site and blew into the town of Port Augusta, concerning residents and impacting air quality.

In February 2017, topsoil application trials were underway and liquid odour suppressant was being applied periodically to the flyash dam.
