= Beltana Station =

Sheep station in South Australia

Coordinates: 30°41′14″S 138°09′24″E

Location in South Australia

Beltana (or Beltana Station) is a pastoral lease in the Australian state of South Australia which operates as a sheep station. Established in 1854, it now covers an area of 1,574 square kilometres (608 sq mi) on land located between Lake Torrens in the west and the Flinders Ranges in the east, about 475 kilometres (295 mi) north of the state capital of Adelaide.

== History ==
The area was first established for pastoralism by John Haimes in 1854 and then surveyed by John McDouall Stuart in 1855. In 1862 the property was acquired by Robert Barr Smith along with the flock of 17,705 sheep that the property was supporting.

Thomas Elder took over lease no. 370 in 1862 forming Beltana Station and until the early 20th century there were as many as 60 living on the station. Beltana Pastoral run for many years was the head station of the Beltana Pastoral Co. The station ran livestock, and a camel breeding programme for work on the Australian Overland Telegraph Line between Adelaide and Darwin, exploring and its own use. It provided living quarters for the "Afghan" cameleers who managed the camels.

=== 21st century ===
On 26 April 2013, the land occupying the appropriate extent of the Beltana pastoral lease was gazetted by the Government of South Australia as a locality under the name Beltana Station. The word "station" was added to the locality’s name to distinguish it from the bounded locality and the government town of Beltana.

On 18 Oct 2017, the station with an area at the time of 1,541 square kilometres (595 sq mi) was sold at auction for A$8.4 million to South Australian pastoralist and Yadlamalka Station owner Andrew Doman. The property holds up to 8,500 livestock and offers 4WD driving tracks and accommodation. Paul and Karen Ellis of Camel Treks Australia relocated to Beltana Station in 2018. As of 2018, it covers an area of 1,574 square kilometres (608 sq mi) on land located between Lake Torrens in the west and the Flinders Ranges in the east, about 475 kilometres (295 mi) north of the state capital of Adelaide.

=== Heritage listing ===
The historic Beltana Station Homestead is listed on the South Australian Heritage Register.

== See also ==
- List of ranches and stations
