= Essential Services Commission of South Australia =

The Essential Services Commission of South Australia (ESCOSA) is the independent economic regulator established by the State Government of South Australia, to regulate prescribed essential utility services supplied by the electricity, gas, water, ports and rail industries.

== History ==
ESCOSA was established under the Essential Services Commission Act 2002 (ESC Act), which came into effect on 12 September 2002. It is the same body corporate as the former South Australian Independent Industry Regulator (SAIIR), which was previously responsible for some of the ESCOSA's regulatory functions.

== Functions ==
Under the ESC Act, the functions of the ESCOSA are to:

- regulate prices and perform licensing and other functions under relevant industry regulation Acts;
- monitor and enforce compliance with and promote improvement in standards and conditions of service and supply under relevant industry regulation Acts;
- make, monitor the operation of, and review from time to time, codes and rules relating to the conduct or operations of a regulated industry or regulated entities;
- provide and require consumer consultation processes in regulated industries and assist consumers and others with information and other services;
- advise the Minister on matters relating to the economic regulation of regulated industries, including reliability issues and services standards;
- advise the Minister on any matter referred by the Minister;
- administer the ESC Act;
- perform functions assigned to the Commission under this or any other Act;
- in appropriate cases, to prosecute offences against this Act or a relevant industry regulation Act.
