= Leigh Creek, South Australia =

Town in rural South Australia

Leigh Creek
- Town
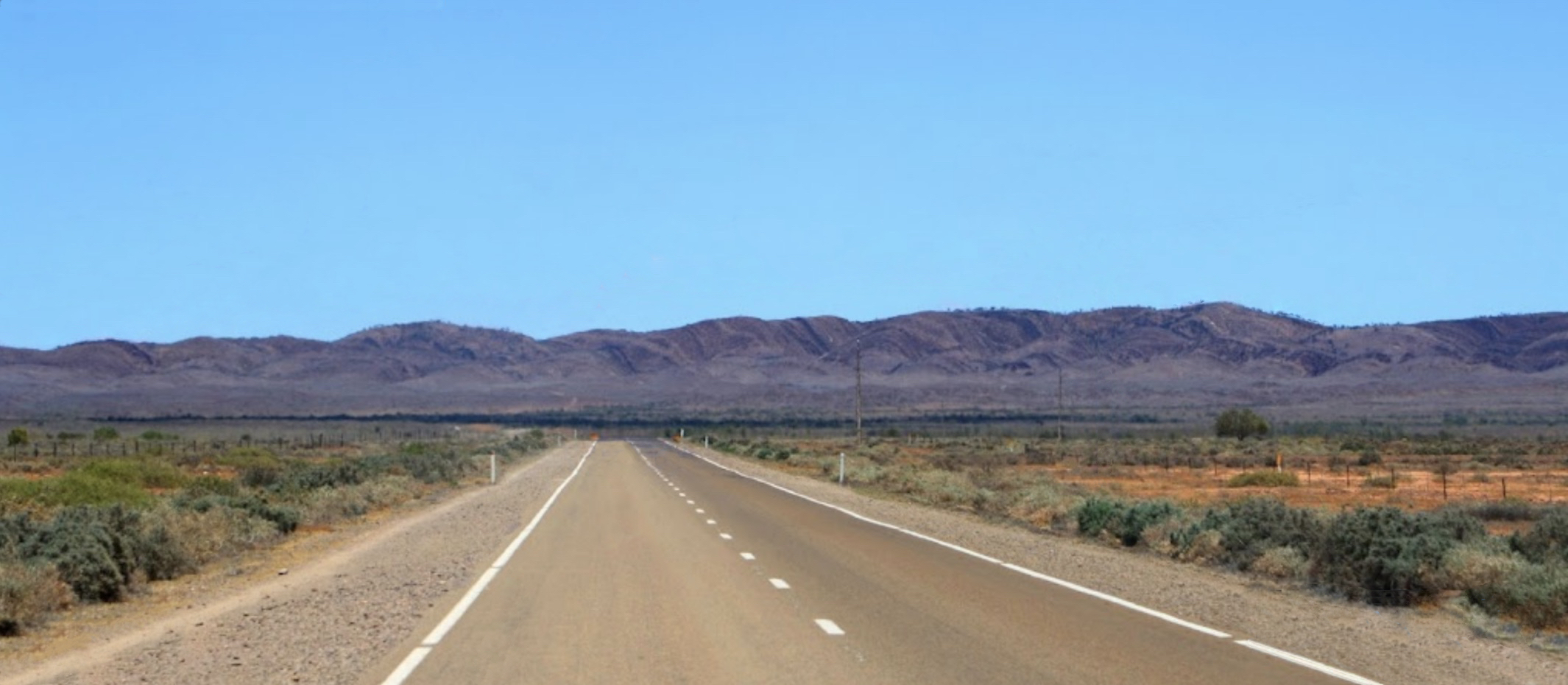
- Hills north of the town, as seen from The Outback Highway

- Coordinates: 30°35′S 138°24′E
- Country: Australia
- State: South Australia
- Region: Far North
- LGA: Outback Communities Authority

Government
  - State electorate: Stuart
  - Federal division: Grey

Population
  - Total: 91 (SAL 2021)
- Time zone: UTC+9:30 (ACST)
  - Summer (DST): UTC+10:30 (ACDT)
- Postcode: 5731
- Mean max temp: 26.3 °C (79.3 °F)
- Mean min temp: 12.8 °C (55.0 °F)
- Annual rainfall: 230.1 mm (9.06 in)
Localities around Leigh Creek
Myrtle Springs	Myrtle Springs	Copley
Puttapa	Leigh Creek	North Moolooloo
Puttapa	Puttapa; North Moolooloo	North Moolooloo

Leigh Creek is a former coal-mining town in eastern central South Australia. At the 2016 census, Leigh Creek had a population of 245, a 55% decrease from 550 in the previous census in 2011.

Situated to the west of the northern Flinders Ranges, the current town is 13 kilometres (8.1 mi) further south than the original town—it was moved to allow for the expansion of the mine and the establishment of the Leigh Creek Retention Dam. Construction of the new town commenced in 1979, by 1980 the first home was occupied, and the old town was fully relocated and inundated by 1982. As a result, most facilities and buildings in the town are only a little over thirty years old, and with relatively modern designs.

The mine and associated railway station are named Telford. It is located on the Marree railway line.

== History ==
The area was named Leigh's Creek after its first settler, Harry Leigh, in 1856. Coal was discovered and small quantities mined from 1888 from an underground mine. The town to support the mine at that time was called Copley, after William Copley, an MP and Commissioner of Crown Lands. However the coal was not mined in a significant commercial manner until 1943 in an effort to make South Australia more self-sufficient for its energy needs, with less dependence on New South Wales. The premier Thomas Playford saw the need to be seen not to rely on interstate energy if he was to attract business to South Australia.

== Coal mine ==
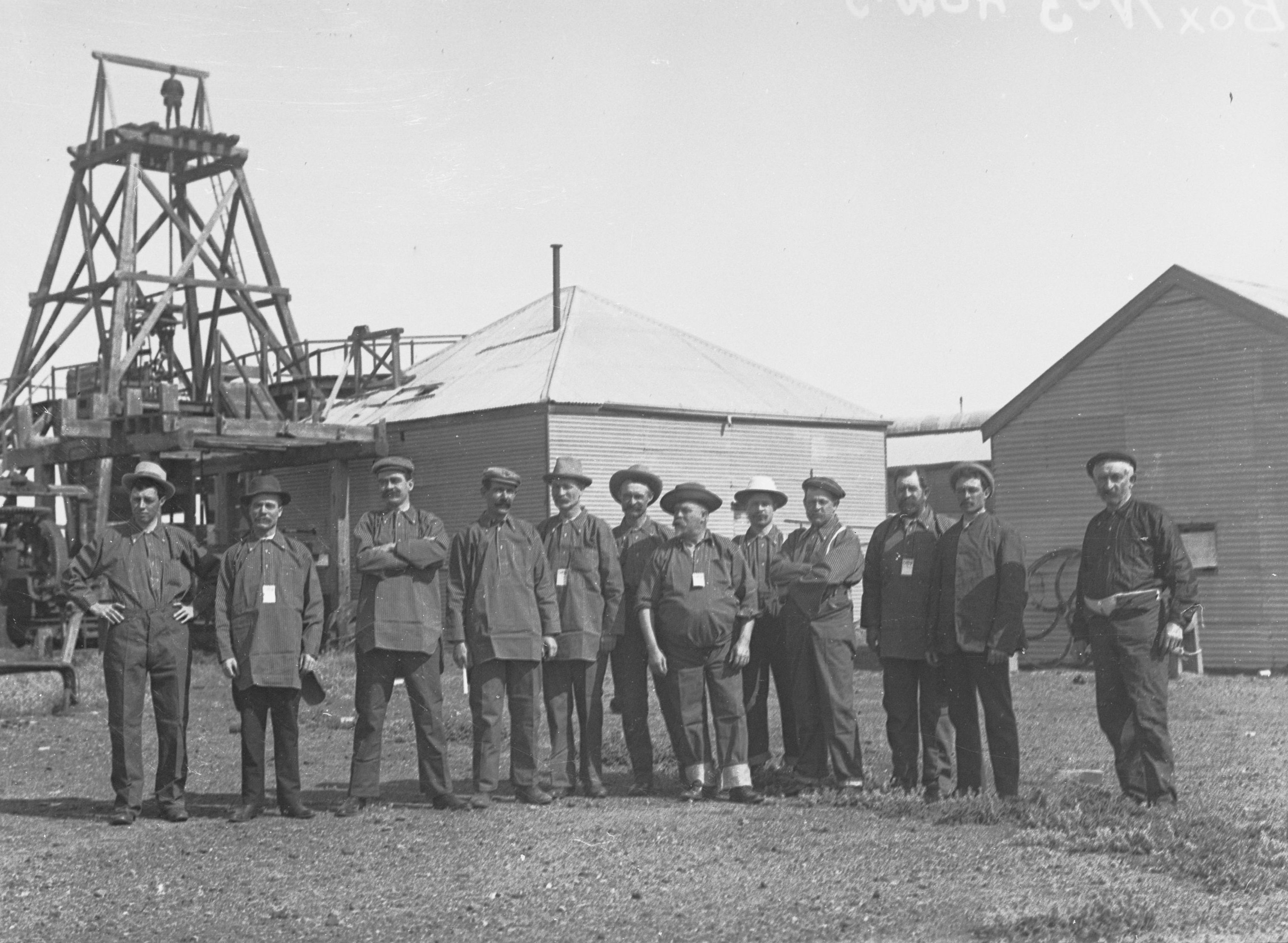
Inspection of Leigh Creek coalfield by a parliamentary party, August 1913

The former open cut mine operation was for low-grade, sub-bitumenous black coal which is frequently referred to as hard brown coal or just brown coal. It was transported 250 km by rail to power stations outside Port Augusta on the east side of Spencer Gulf. The coal occurs in several nested bowl-shaped seams, each several metres thick. The coalfield at Leigh Creek was operated by Alinta Energy and produced over 2.5 million tonnes (2,500,000 long tons; 2,800,000 short tons) a year of coal. Alinta Energy also operated the power stations at Port Augusta which were the only remaining coal-fired generators in South Australia, and the only users of coal from Leigh Creek.

Leigh Creek Retention Dam
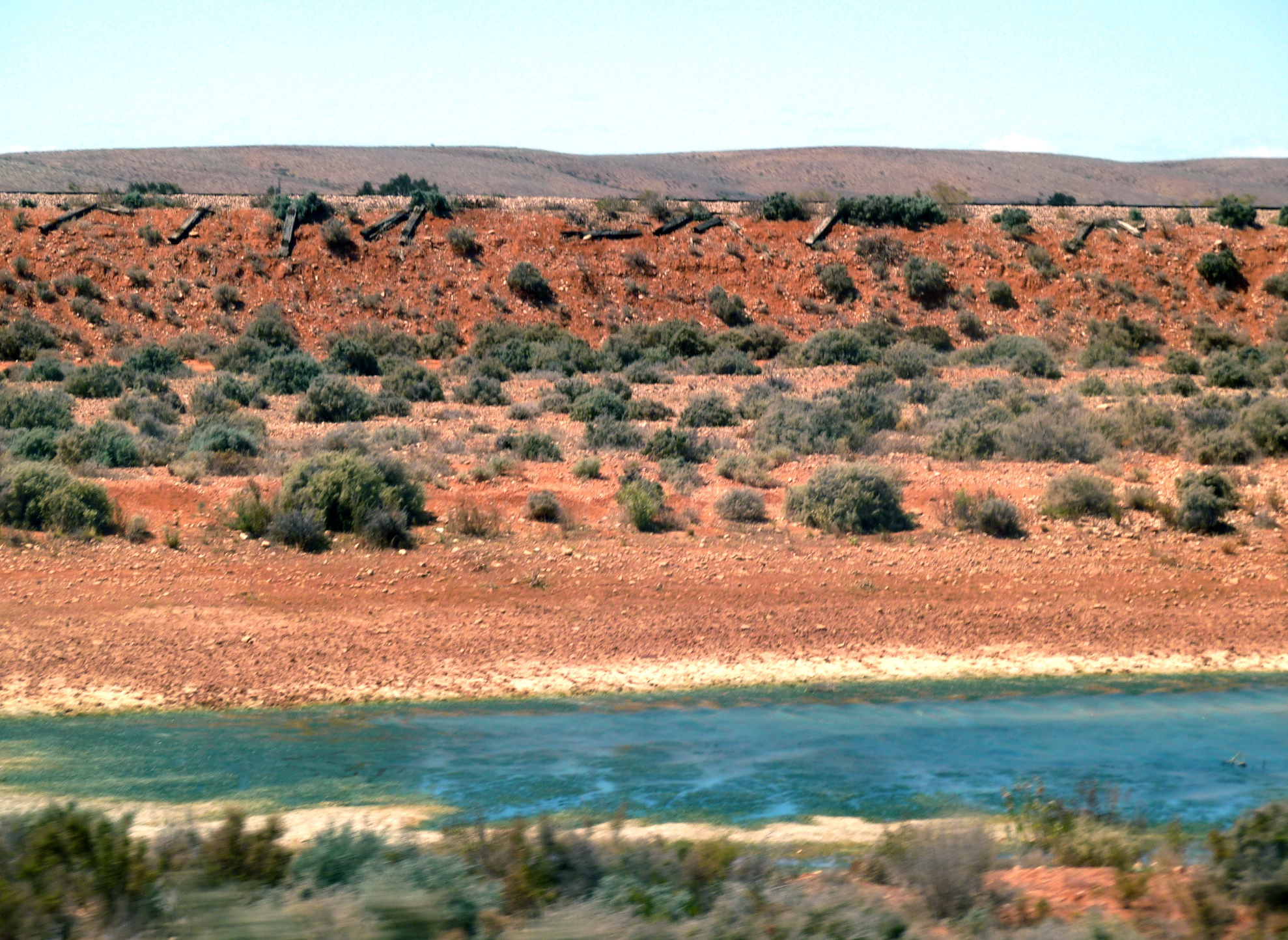
- Most likely the dam, in 2012
- Interactive map of Leigh Creek Retention Dam
- Country: Australia
- Location: Copley, South Australia
- Coordinates: 30°30′56″S 138°23′46″E
- Purpose: Flood control
- Status: Decommissioned
- Opening date: 1981
- Built by: Tripodi Constructions
- Owner: Government of South Australia
- Operator: ETSA Corporation

Dam and spillways
- Type of dam: Earth fill dam
- Impounds: Leigh Creek
- Height (foundation): 24 m (79 ft)
- Length: 1,924 m (6,312 ft)
- Dam volume: 670×10^{3} m^{3} (24×10^{6} cu ft)
- Spillway type: Uncontrolled
- Spillway capacity: 220 m^{3}/s (7,800 cu ft/s)

Reservoir
- Total capacity: 16,700 ML (13,500 acre⋅ft)
- Catchment area: 160 km^{2} (62 sq mi)
- Surface area: 343 ha (850 acres)
- Normal elevation: 220 m (720 ft) AHD

=== Downsizing and mine closure ===
Since the early 1990s, more changes occurred in Leigh Creek. Massive restructuring of mining operations resulted in the reduction of a workforce of over 750 to about 200. The township also became a lot smaller. The population dropped from about 2500 in 1987 to less than 250 in the year 2016.

On 30 July 2015, Alinta Energy announced that the closure dates of all three facilities would be brought forward by 12 months, with an end-date of March 2017, and that they may shut them down as early as March 2016. On 7 October 2015, it was confirmed that the Leigh Creek mining operations would cease on 17 November 2015.

== Leigh Creek Retention Dam ==
The Leigh Creek Retention Dam is a decommissioned earth-filled embankment dam across the waterway, Leigh Creek, located near the hamlet of Copley, approximately 5 kilometres (3.1 mi) northeast of the town of Leigh Creek. The dam was established in 1981 by ETSA Corporation primarily for flood mitigation, and to support the operations of the coalfields. Its establishment resulted in the relocation of the town of Leigh Creek.

The earth-filled dam wall is 24 metres (79 ft) high and 1,924 metres (6,312 ft) long, the longest dam wall in South Australia. When full, the reservoir has capacity of 16,700 megalitres (13,500 acre⋅ft) and covers 343 hectares (850 acres), drawn from a catchment area of 160 square kilometres (62 sq mi). The uncontrolled spillway has a flow capacity of 220 cubic metres per second (7,800 cu ft/s).

Following the closure of the coalfields, the dam was decommissioned and, after community consultation, was remediated as a wildlife refuge for fish, shrimp and native aquatic snails. The spillway was re-engineered and a diversion channel was constructed to allow more water flow to return to the surrounding northern catchments following times of heavy rain. As of 2026, the former dam was a popular location for bird watching.

== Subsequent use of the former mine site ==
In 2015 the Leigh Creek Energy Project (LCEP) was announced. Proposed by the ASX-listed company NeuRizer, formerly listed as Leigh Creek Energy, the project intended to extract gas from Leigh Creek's coal seams by drilling injection and extraction wells and igniting the coal underground using a process known as in-situ coal gasification. The company proposed that the gas would then be exported to Australia's eastern states via existing pipeline networks. An additional plant to produce ammonium nitrate fertilizer and explosives for use in the mining sector was also announced, to be built adjacent to the coal gasification plant. By 2021, the project was re-engineered primarily focused on the production of urea, as a fertiliser, called the NeuRizer Urea Project (NRUP). The revised project faced community opposition; and by 2024 had stalled as a result of changes to the Environment Protection and Biodiversity Conservation Act 1999 (Cth).

== Climate ==
Climate data for Leigh Creek Airport (1991–2020 averages, extremes 1982–present)
Month	Jan	Feb	Mar	Apr	May	Jun	Jul	Aug	Sep	Oct	Nov	Dec	Year
Record high °C (°F)	48.2 (118.8)	45.4 (113.7)	42.4 (108.3)	37.8 (100.0)	32.1 (89.8)	28.4 (83.1)	26.7 (80.1)	33.1 (91.6)	37.7 (99.9)	41.1 (106.0)	46.0 (114.8)	46.2 (115.2)	48.2 (118.8)
Mean daily maximum °C (°F)	36.3 (97.3)	34.9 (94.8)	31.4 (88.5)	26.7 (80.1)	21.2 (70.2)	17.3 (63.1)	17.2 (63.0)	19.4 (66.9)	23.9 (75.0)	27.5 (81.5)	31.2 (88.2)	33.6 (92.5)	26.7 (80.1)
Mean daily minimum °C (°F)	21.3 (70.3)	20.6 (69.1)	17.4 (63.3)	13.2 (55.8)	8.7 (47.7)	5.6 (42.1)	4.8 (40.6)	6.1 (43.0)	9.6 (49.3)	12.8 (55.0)	16.4 (61.5)	18.9 (66.0)	12.9 (55.3)
Record low °C (°F)	11.0 (51.8)	10.3 (50.5)	6.7 (44.1)	2.2 (36.0)	−0.7 (30.7)	−1.7 (28.9)	−2.4 (27.7)	−1.2 (29.8)	0.9 (33.6)	2.5 (36.5)	6.1 (43.0)	8.6 (47.5)	−2.4 (27.7)
Average rainfall mm (inches)	22.5 (0.89)	30.8 (1.21)	13.6 (0.54)	15.6 (0.61)	13.9 (0.55)	16.3 (0.64)	11.7 (0.46)	13.9 (0.55)	19.5 (0.77)	16.3 (0.64)	16.7 (0.66)	17.0 (0.67)	207.8 (8.19)
Average rainy days (≥ 0.2 mm)	3.8	2.9	2.8	2.9	3.7	5.3	5.5	4.6	4.0	4.1	4.2	3.6	47.4

== In popular culture ==
- Leigh Creek Road is referred to in the John Schumann song of the same name on his 1993 album True Believers.
- It features in the 2022 movie, Gold starring Zac Efron.

== See also ==
- Ikara–Flinders Ranges National Park
- List of reservoirs and dams in South Australia
