= Port Augusta =

Port Augusta Goordnada
- City
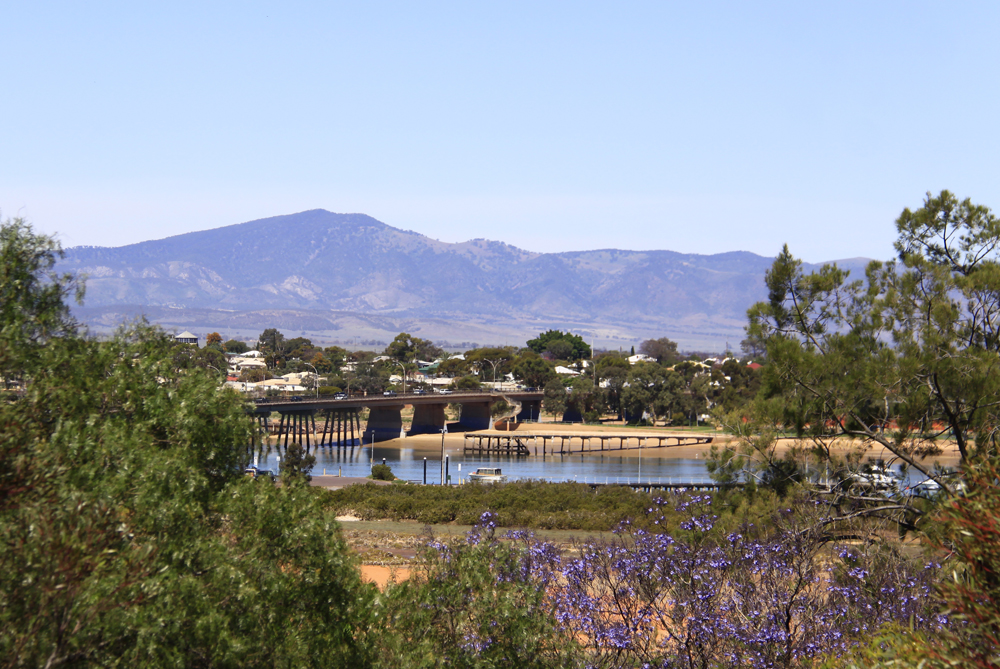
- View across Spencer Gulf to Mount Brown

- Coordinates: 32°29′33″S 137°45′57″E
- Country: Australia
- State: South Australia
- LGA: City of Port Augusta
- Location: 310 km (190 mi) from Adelaide via; 470 km (290 mi) from Ceduna via; 540 km (340 mi) from Coober Pedy via
- Established: 1852

Government
  - State electorate: Giles
  - Federal division: Grey (O'Donoghue)

Population
  - Total: 12,788 (UCL 2021)
- Postcode: 5700
- Mean max temp: 26.3 °C (79.3 °F)
- Mean min temp: 12.2 °C (54.0 °F)
- Annual rainfall: 214.1 mm (8.43 in)

Port Augusta (Goordnada in the revived indigenous Barngarla language) is a coastal city in South Australia about 310 kilometres (190 mi) by road from the state capital, Adelaide. Most of the city is on the eastern shores of Spencer Gulf, immediately south of the gulf's head, comprising the city's centre and surrounding suburbs, Stirling North, and seaside homes at Commissariat Point, Blanche Harbor and Miranda. The suburb of Port Augusta West is on the western side of the gulf on the Eyre Peninsula. Together, these localities had a population of 13,515 in the 2021 census.

Formerly a seaport, the city supports regional agriculture and services many mines in the South Australian interior to its north. A significant industry was electricity generation until 2019, when its coal-burning power stations were shut down. A solar farm opened in 2020.

== History ==
Port Augusta is part of Aboriginal Australians' Nukunu country, in which the local language is Barngarla. The last speaker of the language died in 1964, but successful efforts have been made to revive it based on a 3500-word dictionary compiled in the 1840s by German Lutheran pastor Clamor Wilhelm Schürmann. Its original Barngarla name is Goordnada.

It is a natural harbour, which was proclaimed on 24 May 1852 by Alexander Elder (brother of Thomas Elder) and John Grainger, having discovered it while aboard the Government schooner Yatala, captained by Edward Dowsett. The port was named after Augusta Sophia, Lady Young, the wife of the Governor of South Australia, Sir Henry Edward Fox Young. Lady Young was the daughter of Charles Marryat Snr., who had been a slaveholder in the British West Indies. Her brother was the Anglican minister Dean of Adelaide Charles Marryat.

== Flora and fauna ==
Marine species include resident species and migrating visitors. Occasional sightings are made of whales, sunfish, swordfish and turtles.

== Demographics ==
The city and its surrounds had a population of 13,515 in the 2021 census. It was therefore the fourth largest urban area outside of Adelaide after Mount Gambier, Whyalla and Port Lincoln. 83.4% of residents were born in Australia and 20.8% were Aboriginal or Torres Strait Islander. The most prevalent employment was community and personal service workers (17.7%), professionals (14.9%), technicians and trades workers (14.0%), labourers (13.1%), clerical and administrative workers (11.1%), sales workers (9.3%), machinery operators and drivers (9.3%), and managers (8.3%). The unemployment rate was 6.5% (South Australia: 5.4%). The median weekly household income was A$1277 per week.

== Transport ==
Port Augusta is at the head of Spencer Gulf, a natural barrier to land transport, leading to the city being considered to be the "crossroads of Australia", the junction of major road and rail links.

=== Road ===
Port Augusta is located at the eastern end of the Eyre Highway to Perth and at the northern end of the Augusta Highway to Adelaide. It is situated at the southern end of the Stuart Highway to Darwin. Virtually all road traffic across southern Australia passes through Port Augusta across the top of Spencer Gulf.

Twice-daily coach services operate between Port Augusta, other country centres and Adelaide.

=== Rail ===
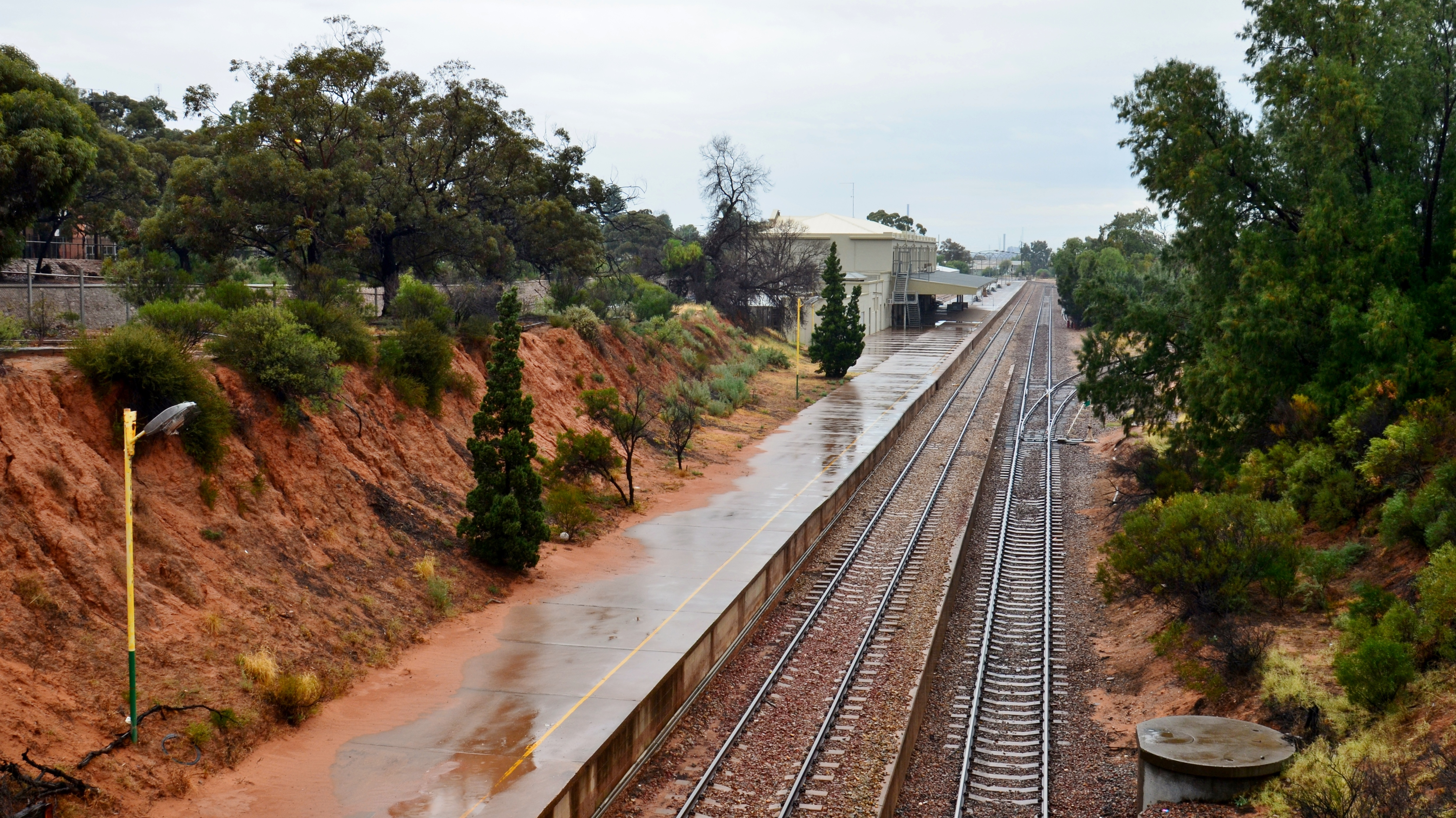
Port Augusta railway station

In 1878, the town became the southern terminus of a proposed north–south transcontinental line headed for Darwin 2500 km (1600 mi) away. As part of its commitments undertaken at Federation, the federal government took over this 1067 mm (3 ft 6 in) narrow-gauge railway in 1911 and named it the "Central Australia Railway" in 1926. In 1929, it was extended to its last terminus at Alice Springs.

Between 1913 and 1917, a 2000 km (1200 mi) long, east–west transcontinental railway, the Trans-Australian Railway, was built from Port Augusta to Kalgoorlie in Western Australia. It was built to 1435 mm (4 ft 8 1/2 in) standard gauge as part of a long-term plan to harmonise gauges between the mainland states. The choice created a break of gauge at Port Augusta until the standard gauge track was extended to Port Pirie in 1937. The last component of the all-through standard gauge line from Adelaide to Darwin was only completed in 2003.

Port Augusta is a stopping place of two long-distance "experiential" train services: the east-west Indian Pacific transcontinental service and The Ghan service between Adelaide and Darwin.

The not-for-profit Pichi Richi Railway, established in the 1970s on the southernmost section of the Central Australia Railway (CAR) at Quorn, was not connected to Port Augusta after the CAR closed in 1980. An ambitious project to build a line from Stirling North to the centre of Port Augusta was completed in 2001 and now provides half-day and full-day heritage railway journeys on selected dates from March to November.

=== Aviation ===
Port Augusta Airport, 6 kilometres (4 miles) from the city, handles about 16,000 "fly-in fly-out" passengers a year who work at many mines in the north of South Australia. As of 2023, no other flights were available at the airport. Adelaide Airport is located 309 kilometres (192 miles) south of Port Augusta.

== Climate ==
Port Augusta has a hot desert climate (Köppen: BWh), with hot summers, mild winters and minimal precipitation year-round. Some authors define it as a hot semi-arid climate (BSh). Temperatures vary throughout the year, with average maxima ranging from 34.1 °C (93.4 °F) in January to 18.0 °C (64.4 °F) in July, while average minima fluctuate between 19.5 °C (67.1 °F) in January and 4.6 °C (40.3 °F) in July. Mean annual rainfall is very low: 221.6 mm (8.72 in), spread between 72.2 precipitation days. There are 142.1 clear days and 92.4 cloudy days annually. Extreme temperatures have ranged from −4.5 °C (23.9 °F) on 3 August 2014 to 50.0 °C (122.0 °F) on 30 January 2026. Port Augusta has desert vegetation, although the city maintains with governmental aid with some plants adapted to aridity. Port Augusta is regarded as a desert environment by the local government.

Climate data for Port Augusta (32º30'36"S, 137º43'12"E, 14 m AMSL) (2001–2024 normals and extremes, 3 pm humidity 1962–1997)
Month	Jan	Feb	Mar	Apr	May	Jun	Jul	Aug	Sep	Oct	Nov	Dec	Year
Record high °C (°F)	50.0 (122.0)	48.1 (118.6)	43.2 (109.8)	40.3 (104.5)	32.2 (90.0)	29.6 (85.3)	26.9 (80.4)	32.8 (91.0)	38.4 (101.1)	42.9 (109.2)	46.3 (115.3)	48.5 (119.3)	50.0 (122.0)
Mean daily maximum °C (°F)	34.1 (93.4)	33.1 (91.6)	30.7 (87.3)	26.6 (79.9)	21.5 (70.7)	18.1 (64.6)	18.0 (64.4)	20.0 (68.0)	24.1 (75.4)	27.0 (80.6)	30.0 (86.0)	32.1 (89.8)	26.3 (79.3)
Daily mean °C (°F)	26.8 (80.2)	26.0 (78.8)	23.8 (74.8)	19.8 (67.6)	15.1 (59.2)	12.0 (53.6)	11.3 (52.3)	12.7 (54.9)	16.3 (61.3)	19.5 (67.1)	22.6 (72.7)	24.7 (76.5)	19.2 (66.6)
Mean daily minimum °C (°F)	19.5 (67.1)	18.8 (65.8)	16.8 (62.2)	12.9 (55.2)	8.6 (47.5)	5.9 (42.6)	4.6 (40.3)	5.4 (41.7)	8.5 (47.3)	11.9 (53.4)	15.2 (59.4)	17.3 (63.1)	12.1 (53.8)
Record low °C (°F)	11.7 (53.1)	6.8 (44.2)	6.6 (43.9)	4.2 (39.6)	−1.9 (28.6)	−4 (25)	−4.1 (24.6)	−4.5 (23.9)	0.0 (32.0)	2.2 (36.0)	6.9 (44.4)	7.7 (45.9)	−4.5 (23.9)
Average precipitation mm (inches)	15.3 (0.60)	18.4 (0.72)	11.9 (0.47)	19.9 (0.78)	16.4 (0.65)	24.1 (0.95)	15.8 (0.62)	15.2 (0.60)	18.3 (0.72)	18.9 (0.74)	21.7 (0.85)	25.8 (1.02)	221.6 (8.72)
Average precipitation days (≥ 0.2 mm)	3.6	2.5	3.3	4.2	7.1	11.3	10.6	8.3	5.6	5.5	5.7	4.5	72.2
Average afternoon relative humidity (%)	36	36	39	41	48	53	51	45	40	37	35	37	42
Average dew point °C (°F)	11.5 (52.7)	11.9 (53.4)	11.0 (51.8)	8.4 (47.1)	7.6 (45.7)	6.4 (43.5)	5.2 (41.4)	4.3 (39.7)	4.7 (40.5)	6.0 (42.8)	7.7 (45.9)	10.1 (50.2)	7.9 (46.2)
Source: Bureau of Meteorology (2001–2024 normals and extremes, 3 pm humidity 1962–1997)

== Economy ==
=== Electricity generation ===
From the mid-1920s, the town was supplied with direct current electricity, which changed to alternating current in 1948.

Electricity was generated at the Playford B (240 MW) and Northern power stations (520 MW) from brown coal mined at Leigh Creek, 250 km to the north. The only coal-fired electricity generating plants in South Australia, in 2009 they produced 33% of the state's electricity, but over 50% of the state's CO_{2} emissions from electricity generation.

Playford B has not been operational since 2012. In October 2015, Alinta Energy announced the permanent closure of both Northern and Playford B in early 2016. The Northern Power Station went offline in May 2016.

In 2016, a local community group was lobbying for assistance to replace the coal-fired plants with a solar thermal power station. The premier of South Australia, Jay Weatherill announced in August 2017 that construction would begin in 2018 and was expected to be completed in 2020. The Aurora Solar Thermal Power Project is expected to cost A$650M to build, including a A$110M loan from the Federal Government, and deliver 150MW of electricity. SolarReserve has a contract to supply all of the electricity required by the state government's offices from this power project.

=== Arid-zone horticulture ===
Separately, Sundrop Farms has a combined solar power tower, greenhouse and desalination plant which is used to produce tomatoes near the old power station site. It opened in October 2016 and produces 39MW of thermal energy from over 23,000 mirrors and a 127 metres (417 ft) tower, used for heating, electricity, and desalination to irrigate tomatoes in greenhouses. Sundrop has a 10-year contract to supply Coles Supermarkets with at least 15,000 tonnes of truss tomatoes per year.

=== Tourism ===
Port Augusta has been able to capitalise on the growing eco-tourism industry due to its proximity to the Flinders Ranges. The Pichi Richi Railway is a major drawcard, connecting Port Augusta to Quorn via the Pichi Richi Pass.

Within Port Augusta is the City of Port Augusta's Wadlata Outback Centre, providing tourists with an introduction to life in the Australian outback. The centre recorded over 500,000 visitors in 2006. North of the town, on the Stuart Highway, is the Australian Arid Lands Botanic Garden, a unique and award-winning garden, opened in 1996, which "showcases a diverse collection of arid zone habitats in a picturesque setting of more than 250 hectares". The gardens have a cafe/restaurant with views across the saltbush plains to the escarpment of the Flinders Ranges. The PACC annual report shows more than 100,000 people visited the gardens in 2006.

Southwest of town is the El-Alamein army base.

=== Proposed multi-commodity port ===
In February 2019, the site of the former Playford power stations was sold by Alinta Energy to Cu-River Mining as a prospective port development site. The company intended to construct a transshipment facility suitable for the export of iron ore, wheat and other commodities.

== Media ==
Radio stations that broadcast to Port Augusta are:

- ABC North and West SA on 639 AM (Regional)
- ABC NewsRadio on 102.7 FM (National)
- Radio National on 106.7 FM (National)
- ABC Classic on 104.3 FM (National)
- 5AU on 97.9 FM (Community)
- Umeewarra Radio on 89.1 FM (Aboriginal-owned community radio)

Television coverage in the city is provided by the ABC, SBS, GTS/BKN (7, 9 and 10) and Foxtel.

The major publication of the town is The Transcontinental, a weekly newspaper that was first issued in October 1914 and continues to be located on Commercial Road. In 1971, a brief experiment, known as the Northern Observer (7 July 1971 – 30 August 1971), occurred when The Transcontinental and The Recorder from Port Pirie were published under a combined title in Port Pirie.

Historically, the town published the Dispatch (1877–1916), which, as was common at the time, evolved through a series of name changes: Port Augusta Dispatch (18 August 1877 – 6 August 1880); Port Augusta Dispatch and Flinders' Advertiser (13 August 1880 – 17 October 1884); Port Augusta Dispatch (20 October 1884 – 16 March 1885); and, Port Augusta Dispatch, Newcastle and Flinders Chronicle (18 March 1885 – 21 April 1916). For a short period, due to the short-lived discovery of gold at Teetulpa, a sister publication Teetulpa News and Golden Age (1886–1887) was printed by the Dispatch.

Another publication, the Port Augusta and Stirling Illustrated News (1901), was printed briefly in the town by James Taylor, but was curtailed so he could focus on his printing business.

== Politics ==
=== State and federal ===
2006 state election
Labor	62.3%
Liberal	30.7%
Family First	3.0%
Greens	2.3%
Democrats	1.3%
Independent	0.3%

2007 federal election
Labor	53.99%
Liberal	31.4%
Family First	4.47%
Greens	3.86%
National	3.32%
Independent	1.69%
Democrats	1.27%

2025 federal election
Labor	24.93%
Liberal	24.39%
Independent (Anita)	18.97%
Greens	12.47%
One Nation	8.94%
National Party	4.64%
Family First	3.25%
Trumpet of Patriots	2.71 %

Since the 2024 redistribution, Port Augusta is in the state electoral district of Giles. In federal politics, the city is part of the division of Grey, and has been represented by Liberal MP Tom Venning since 2025. Grey is held with a margin of 4.64%. The results shown are from the largest polling station in Port Augusta – which is located at Port Augusta TAFE college.

=== Local ===
Port Augusta is in the City of Port Augusta local government area. The City of Port Augusta is believed to have had the longest serving mayor in Australia, Joy Baluch, who died after 30 years of service on 14 May 2013. The council is based at the Port Augusta Civic Centre; prior to 1983, it operated out of the now-disused Port Augusta Town Hall.

== Heritage listings ==
Port Augusta has a number of heritage-listed sites, including:

- Beauchamp Lane: Port Augusta Waterworks
- Beauchamp Lane: Beatton Memorial Drinking Fountain
- Beauchamp Lane: Gladstone Square Bandstand
- 9 Church Street: St Augustine's Anglican Church, Port Augusta
- Commercial Road: Old Port Augusta railway station
- 52 Commercial Road: Port Augusta Institute
- 54 Commercial Road: Port Augusta Town Hall
- 34 Flinders Terrace: Port Augusta School of the Air
- 1 Jervois Street: Port Augusta Courthouse
- Stirling Street: Port Augusta railway station
- off Tassie Street: Port Augusta Wharf
- 12 Tassie Street: Bank of South Australia, Port Augusta

== See also ==
- Point Paterson Desalination Plant
- The Sundowners (1960), partly filmed on location in Port Augusta
- List of extreme temperatures in Australia
