= Copley railway station, South Australia =

Railway station in Copley, Australia

Copley
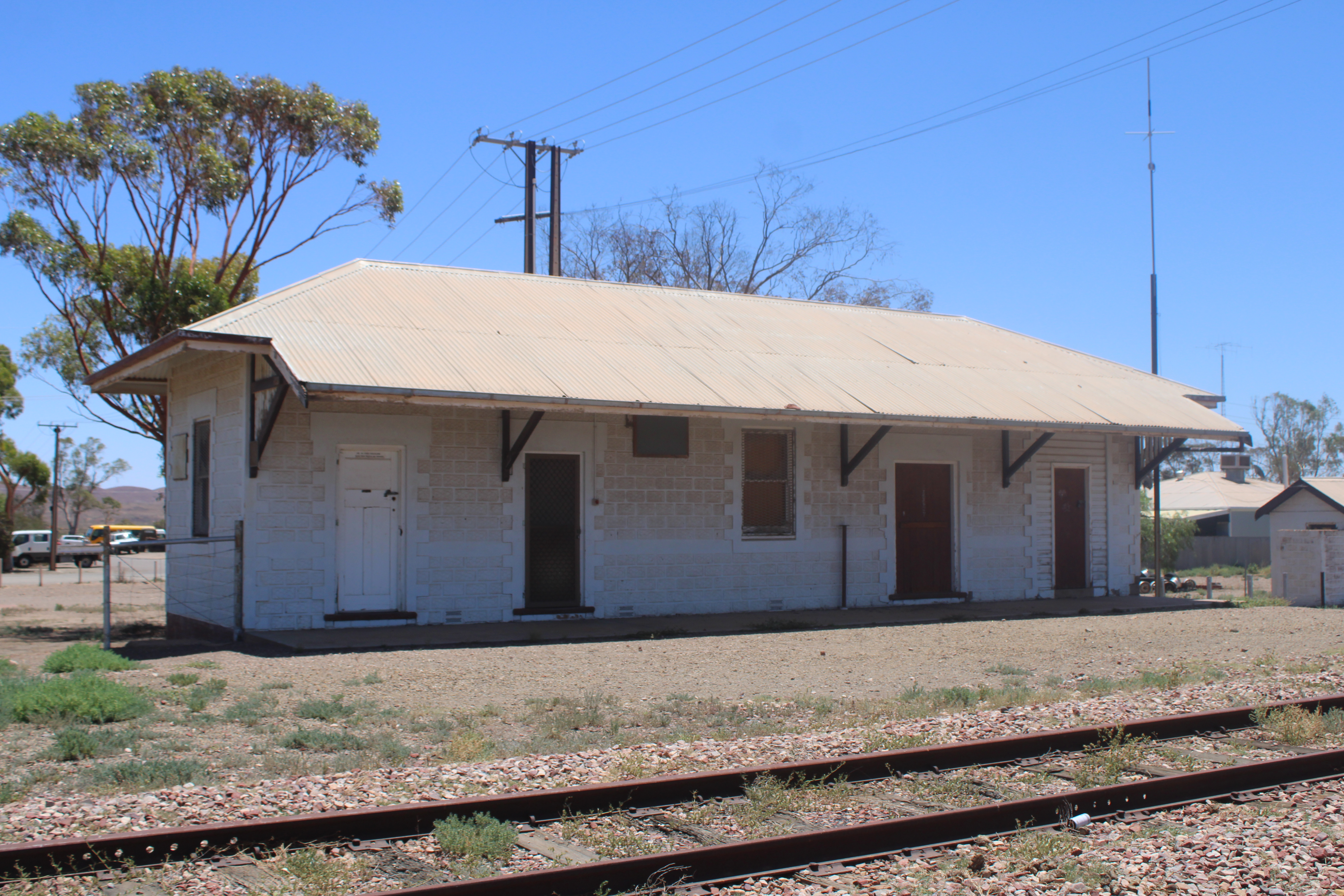
- The station building at Copley railway station in January 2021.

General information
- Coordinates: 30.5541°S 138.4244°E
- Operator: South Australian Railways 1882–1926; Commonwealth Railways1926–1975; Australian National 1975–1987
- Lines: Central Australia Railway, Marree railway line
- Distance: 596 kilometres from Adelaide
- Platforms: 1

Construction
- Structure type: Ground

Other information
- Status: Closed

History
- Opened: 1881 - 1882
- Closed: Mid 1990s
- Rebuilt: 27 July 1957
- Former names: Leigh Creek

Services
Preceding station	Commonwealth Railways	Following station
Puttapa towards Port Augusta	Central Australia Railway	Farina towards Alice Springs
Puttapa towards Stirling North	Marree railway line	Farina towards Marree
Location

Copley railway station was located on the Central Australia Railway, and later the Marree railway line serving the small South Australian outback town of Copley.

== History ==
=== Early history ===
The Copley railway station was opened between 1881 and 1882 as Leigh Creek railway station during the construction of the railway from Port Augusta to Government Gums (now Farina). It was located south of Telford railway station. The town of Leigh Creek was built next to Telford railway station to support the coal mine, while the town of Copley was built next to Leigh Creek railway station. This prompted the renaming of the station to Copley in 1916.

=== Conversion to standard gauge ===
Following the decision to construct two Power Stations at Port Augusta, fed by coal trains from Leigh Creek, it was recognised that the existing narrow gauge railway line would not be capable of handling the new traffic. Construction of a new standard gauge railway began in 1952, opening to Leigh Creek in 1956 and Marree in 1957. Copley received a new brick station building similar to those at Telford and Marree, and a goods platform. Copley was one of the places where the 2 lines crossed over.

=== Decline and closure ===
Regular passenger services through the town ceased when The Ghan was rerouted via Tarcoola. However, a mixed goods service continued operating to Marree until 1985, when this was replaced by a goods-only service. The service was curtailed to Copley in June 1987 and stopped operating in the mid-1990s. Leaving the Leigh Creek coal train as the only movement through the station until its cessation in 2016, though it did not service Copley.

=== Present day ===
Today, the standard gauge station building, goods platform, and water column survive. The line from Stirling North to Telford Cut remains intact, and Flinders Power handed the line back to the state government in 2017.
