= Yudnamutana, South Australia =

Yudnamutana
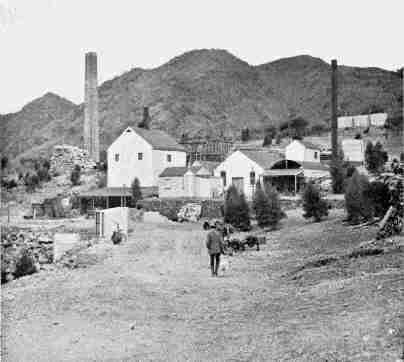
- Copper smelters of Yudnamutana in 1910

- Coordinates: 30°10′0″S 139°17′0″E
- Country: Australia
- State: South Australia
- Location: 16 km (9.9 mi) North West of Arkaroola; 700 km (430 mi) North of Adelaide
- Established: 1862-1865 and 1903-1912 or 1930s? (Note: Dates vary in the sources - see article body.)

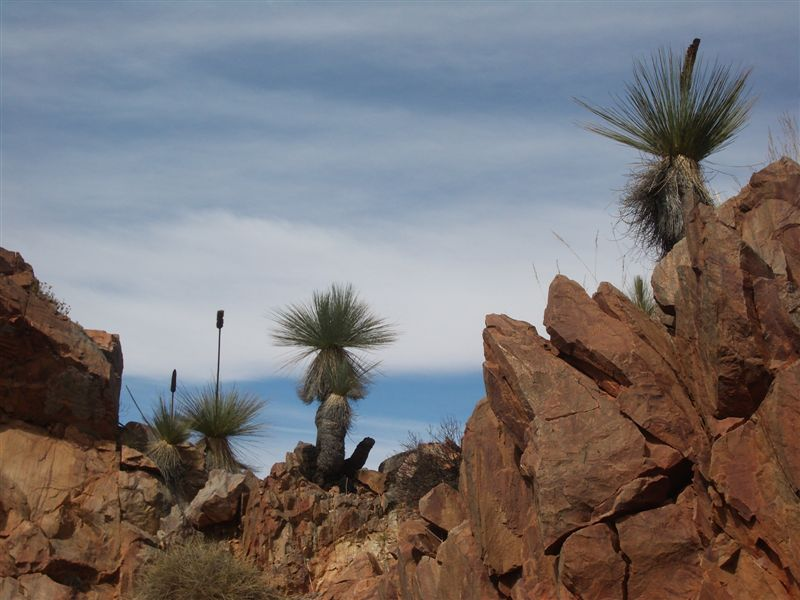
Exotic outback vegetation on the crests east of Yudnamutana.

Yudnamutana (/jədnəˌmuːˈtɑːnə/ yəd-nə-moo-TAH-nə), also referred to as Yuda, is a historic mining valley in the northern Flinders Ranges of South Australia. Copper was mined there between 1862 and 1865 and again from 1903 to 1912, but has been abandoned since. It is located at Mount Freeling, northwest of Arkaroola on the edge of the wilderness sanctuary.

== History ==
=== Indigenous people ===
This area was inhabited by the Adnyamathanha people of Aboriginal Australians for millennia (up to 49,000 years) before the arrival of Europeans.

=== European settlement ===
This area was first settled by pastoralists in the 1950s. Mount Freeling pastoral lease was established 1870.

Prospectors followed soon afterwards, hoping to find another copper deposit similar to that found at Burra.

== Mining ==
In 1859 a copper deposit was found by A. Frost and H. Gleeson. Yudnamutana was the site of an early South Australian copper mine, which also became known as Yuda. First mined in 1862, it reached fame in Adelaide shortly afterwards when a block of ore weighing 4 tonnes (3.9 long tons) was paraded through the streets. Copper concentrates were hauled to Port Augusta in drays by animals along rough tracks – a distance of about 300 kilometres (190 miles). This limiting factor affected the company's profitability. A drought in 1869 forced the closure of the mine (Note: Mindat.org says 1867 closure.) because not enough water was available for animals that worked at the mine. 1862-1865 and 1903-1912

Another attempt was made at mining the site at the start of the 20th century. Transport was less costly this time – by dray for only 100 kilometres (62 miles) to the Central Australia Railway at Farina, then by train. The mine's proprietors tried to further reduce the cost of transport by instigating a road train to Farina railway station in 1909. However, the rough terrain and mechanical breakdowns soon ended the scheme.

A small smelter was constructed at Farina in 1909 or 1910, but it closed after only a few experiments, and was demolished in 1938.

One source reports that the mine itself finally closed by 1912; another says that it was worked by Flinders Copper Mining Company between 1914 and 1918; a third says that it was worked sporadically up until the 1930s.

All that remains of this settlement are two large boilers, some mine shafts, some dugouts and the cemetery.

== Location and description ==
The valley is located on Mount Freeling Station. It is situated on the divide between the basins of Lake Eyre, Lake Frome, and Lake Blanche.

The site is accessible by four-wheel drive from the south. A hike on Mawson Plateau that takes 7-10 days, starting via Mount Freeling Station, passing the Mount Fitton Station ruin and the mine site, is described on the Adelaide Bushwalkers website . (Note any hiking on Mt Freeling Station must be approved by contacting them directly prior to arrival)

The northern pass hosts black rocks of magnetite. Other minerals at Yuda include azurite, malachite, quartz, and others.
