= Marree railway station =

Railway station in Marree, Australia

Marree
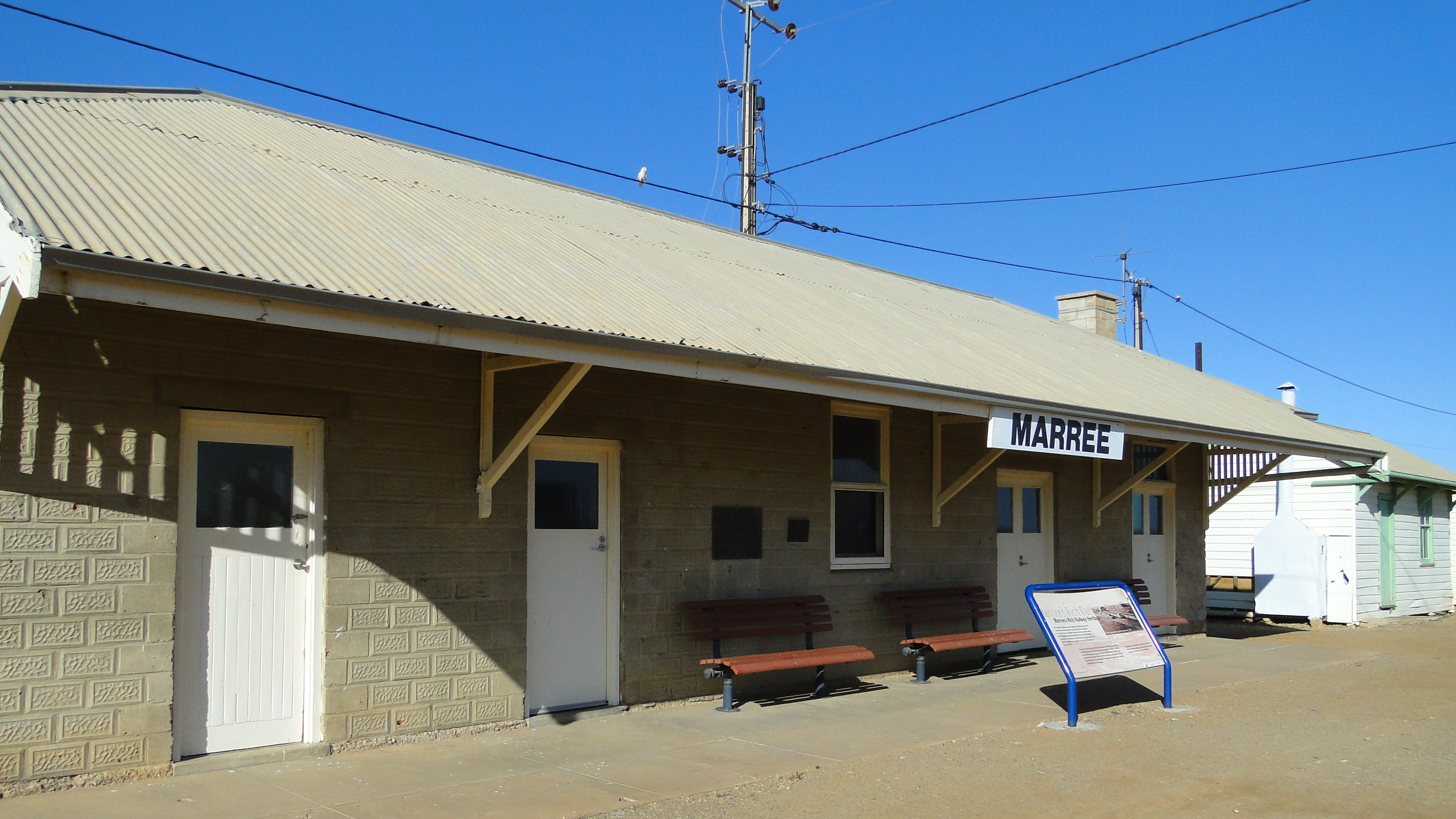
- The former Marree railway station building, with an explanatory sign outside, in 2013

General information
- Coordinates: 29.38°S 138.03°E
- Operator: South Australian Railways 1884–1926; Commonwealth Railways 1926–1975; Australian National 1975–1987
- Lines: Central Australia Railway, Marree railway line
- Distance: 709 kilometres from Adelaide
- Platforms: 2 (1 island)

Construction
- Structure type: Ground

Other information
- Status: Closed

History
- Opened: 7 February 1884
- Closed: 10 June 1987
- Rebuilt: 27 July 1957
- Former names: Hergott Springs

Services
Preceding station	Commonwealth Railways	Following station
Farina towards Port Augusta	Central Australia Railway	Callanna towards Alice Springs
Farina towards Stirling North	Marree railway line	Terminus
Location

Marree railway station was located on the Central Australia Railway, and later the Marree railway line serving the small South Australian outback town of Marree.

== History ==
=== Early history ===
Marree station opened on 7 February 1884 at what was then known as Hergott Springs as the terminus of the Central Australia Railway when it was extended from Farina. The line was extended to Coward Springs on 1 February 1888. The town and railway station were renamed as Marree in 1917. In 1891, the line was extended north to Oodnadatta, ultimately reaching Alice Springs in 1929.

=== Conversion to dual gauge ===
On 27 July 1957, Marree became a dual-gauge junction station, when the extension of the standard gauge line was opened originally to convey coal from Telford Cut to Stirling North since the capacity of the flood-prone, lightly constructed narrow gauge line from Port Augusta was inadequate for tonnages required to serve the new Playford A Power Station near Port Augusta, being extended to Marree to cater for cattle traffic. The narrow gauge line south of Marree remained operational until the standard gauge line was completed. As part of the new standard gauge line, the station was rebuilt with a new brick station building similar to those at Copley and Telford, an island platform to serve standard gauge trains on one side and narrow gauge trains on the other, and a goods shed and platform for standard gauge trains.

=== Decline and closure ===
The narrow gauge trains north of Marree ceased when a new standard gauge line opened from Tarcoola to Alice Springs in 1980, replacing the Central Australia Railway in its role as the line to Alice Springs. This led to the cessation of regular passenger services to Marree, but passengers were still able to travel there via mixed goods trains until 1985 when the service was replaced with a goods only train. A farewell train was operated to Marree using a set of Bluebird railcars on 9 May 1987. The line was officially closed on 10 June 1987 and removed in 1993.

=== Present day ===
Located at the station are the station building (housing a museum); the 250-metre (820-foot) passenger platform with 1067 mm (3 ft 6 in) narrow-gauge track on one side and 1435 mm (4 ft 8 1/2 in) standard-gauge track on the other; water tanks; some other structures; and extensive rail tracks in the railway yard. Two NSU class diesel-electric locomotives (NSU57, NSU60) and two wagons, owned by the Marree Progress Association, are located at the station. The former 3-kilometre (1.9-mile) turning loop, with cattle yards and a 200-metre (660-foot) freight platform still intact, are to the west of the station.

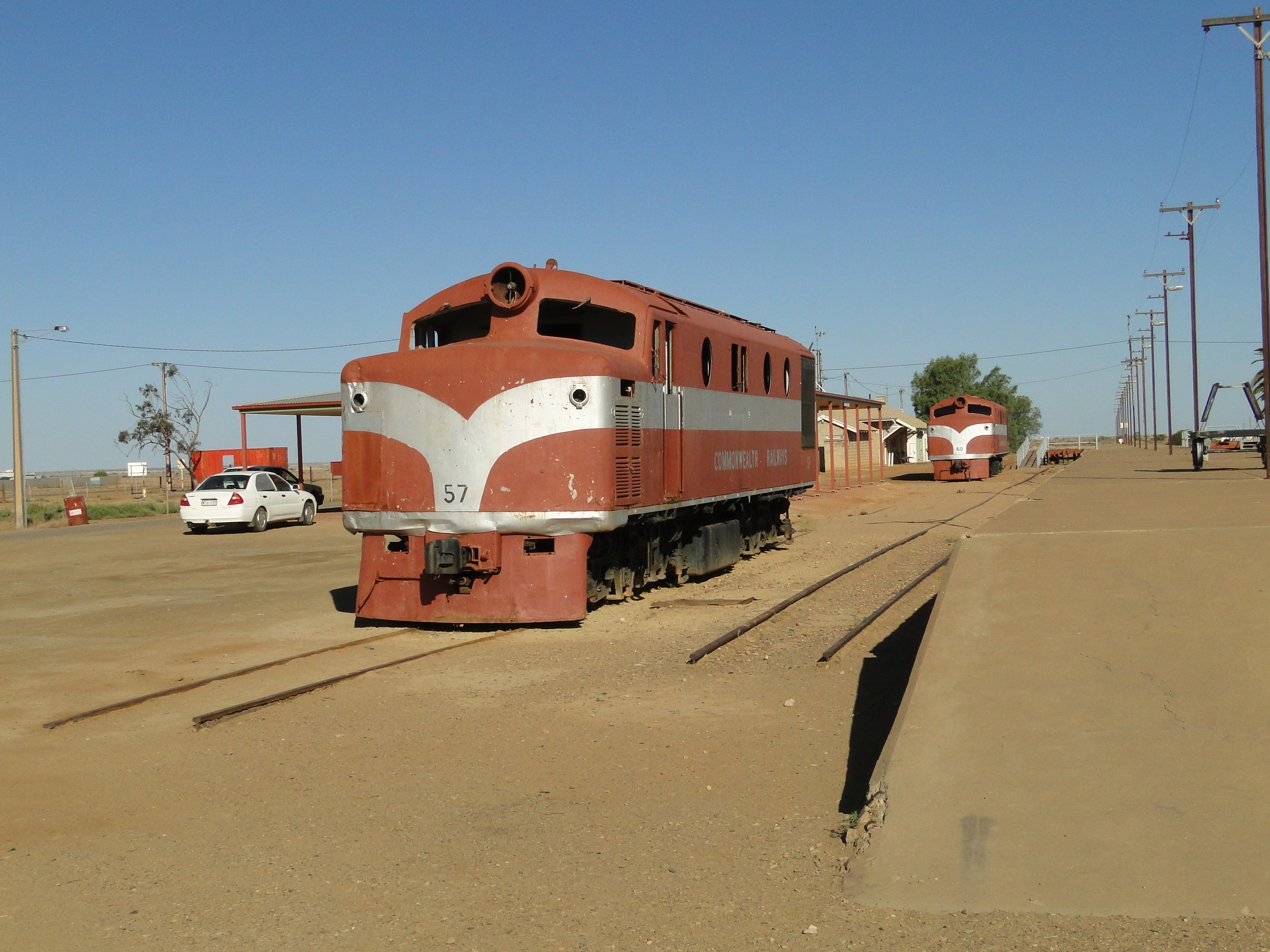
From 1954 until they were retired in 1987, Commonwealth Railways NSU class diesel-electric locomotives did the lion's share of work on the Central Australia Railway. Two of them, NSU57 and NSU60, are displayed at Marree in this 2013 scene.
