= Charlotte Somerfield =

Australian pioneer and entrepreneur

Charlotte Bridget Somerfield (née Jung; 1870–1946) is a Central Australian pioneer and entrepreneur. She and her husband had the mail contract for deliveries by camel between the railhead at Oodnadatta and Alice Springs between 1921 and 1926.

== Early life ==
Jung was born on 28 November 1870 to Bridget, an Irish Catholic immigrant from County Clare, and Carl, a German-Prussian immigrant. They lived at Blackwood Flat in the Hundred of Caroline via Mount Gambier in southeast South Australia. Carl was a shoemaker and wine merchant. She was one of three girls, however her mother also had three children from a former marriage.

Jung's father Carl was the first man hanged in the Mount Gambier goal on 10 November 1871 for the murder of a bailiff, Thomas Garroway. His body is interred in the walls. Charlotte was only a year old.

By the 1890s, Charlotte was working as a domestic servant at Farina on the northern railway line in far north South Australia. Now a ghost town, it had been established in 1882 as a farming centre and railhead for wool and cattle. It was here she met her future husband John Somerfield, a labourer. They were married on 23 June 1895.

In around 1901 they moved down to Mount Gambier. Like her mother before her, Charlotte’s marriage was to have tragic consequences. In 1915, John was kicked in the chest by a horse and died eventually two years later from an Aortic Aneurism. Charlotte was left widowed with nine children, the youngest only three years old (she had also had another child that had died only six days old).

== Life in the Northern Territory ==
At the age of 51, Charlotte made a courageous sea change. She packed up and left Mount Gambier with some of her ten children and journeyed to Old Crown Point just over the South Australian border into the Northern Territory. Here she joined her former brother-in-law William Somerfield, the older brother of her dead husband John. They were married on 14 May 1921 at the Police Residence at Oodnadatta, the end of the railway line from Adelaide.

William Ephraim Somerfield was known as “Eph” or “Unk,” short for Uncle as he was certainly uncle to Charlotte’s children. In the past he had been a teamster, carting wool and supplies along the famous Strezlecki Track and had also tried his luck as a miner and drover at the Arltunga goldfields in the Northern Territory. It may have been a marriage of convenience as Charlotte needed a father for her children; William needed a mother for his two young children, Elsie Bridget (Tooli) and Harold Paul (Sikki). Their dead mother had been an Arunta woman known as Annie.

The family worked on the mail contract for deliveries between the railhead, Oodnadatta and the Telegraph Station and post office at Alice Springs. Old Crown Point was the halfway stopover point. Using camels, the trip would take three weeks each way. They also ran a general store at Old Crown Point supplying the surrounding cattle stations, the Lutheran mission at Hermannsburg and passersby with stores and provisions.

Life was harsh and isolated in this far off outback region during the early 1920s and is illustrated best by the circumstances surrounding the tragic death of Charlotte’s 13-year-old daughter Mary Ellen known as Nellie. On 1 March 1925 the young girl died of a hole in the heart. A family story tells that a table was cut up to make the coffin because there was no other wood available. She was buried at Old Crown Well, and her grave is on the Northern Territory Register of Isolated or Lone Graves.

== Later life ==
The family moved back to Mount Gambier approximately a year after Nellie’s death, perhaps motivated by the isolation and recent tragedy. The use of motor vehicles was increasing and the railway was being extended to Alice Springs which would put an end to the need for deliveries by camels and donkey.

In 1943 Charlotte moved in with her son John and family in Mount Gambier following the death of husband William Ephraim. She was remembered by the family as being “a very stern old lady who used to get up and say ‘time for bed’... she always wore black.” She died in 1946 and is buried at Lake Terrace Cemetery with her first husband John.
