= Central Australia Railway =

Former Australian narrow-gauge railway line

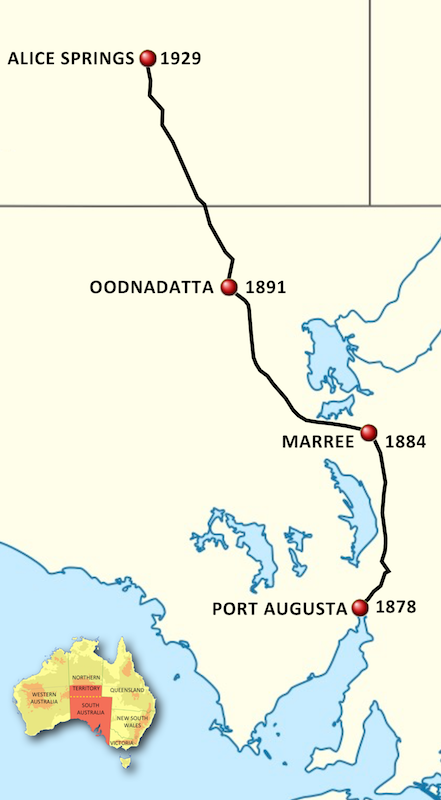
- Route and principal completion dates

Overview
- Status: Partially closed and removed, remaining section used by the Pichi Richi Railway
- Termini: Stirling North near Port Augusta; Alice Springs

Service
- System: South Australian Railways 1878–1917; South Australian Railways on behalf of Commonwealth Railways 1917–1926; Commonwealth Railways 1926–1975; Australian National (CR's successor agency) 1975–1981
- Operator(s): South Australian Railways; Commonwealth Railways (became Australian National)

History
- Opened: Port Augusta–Marree: 1884; Marree–Oodnadatta: 1891; Oodnadatta–Alice Springs: 1929
- Closed: 1981

Technical
- Line length: 1,241 km (771 mi)
- Track gauge: 1,067 mm (3 ft 6 in); 1,435 mm (4 ft 8 1/2 in) standard gauge from 1957 to 2016 (new route Port Augusta–Marree)

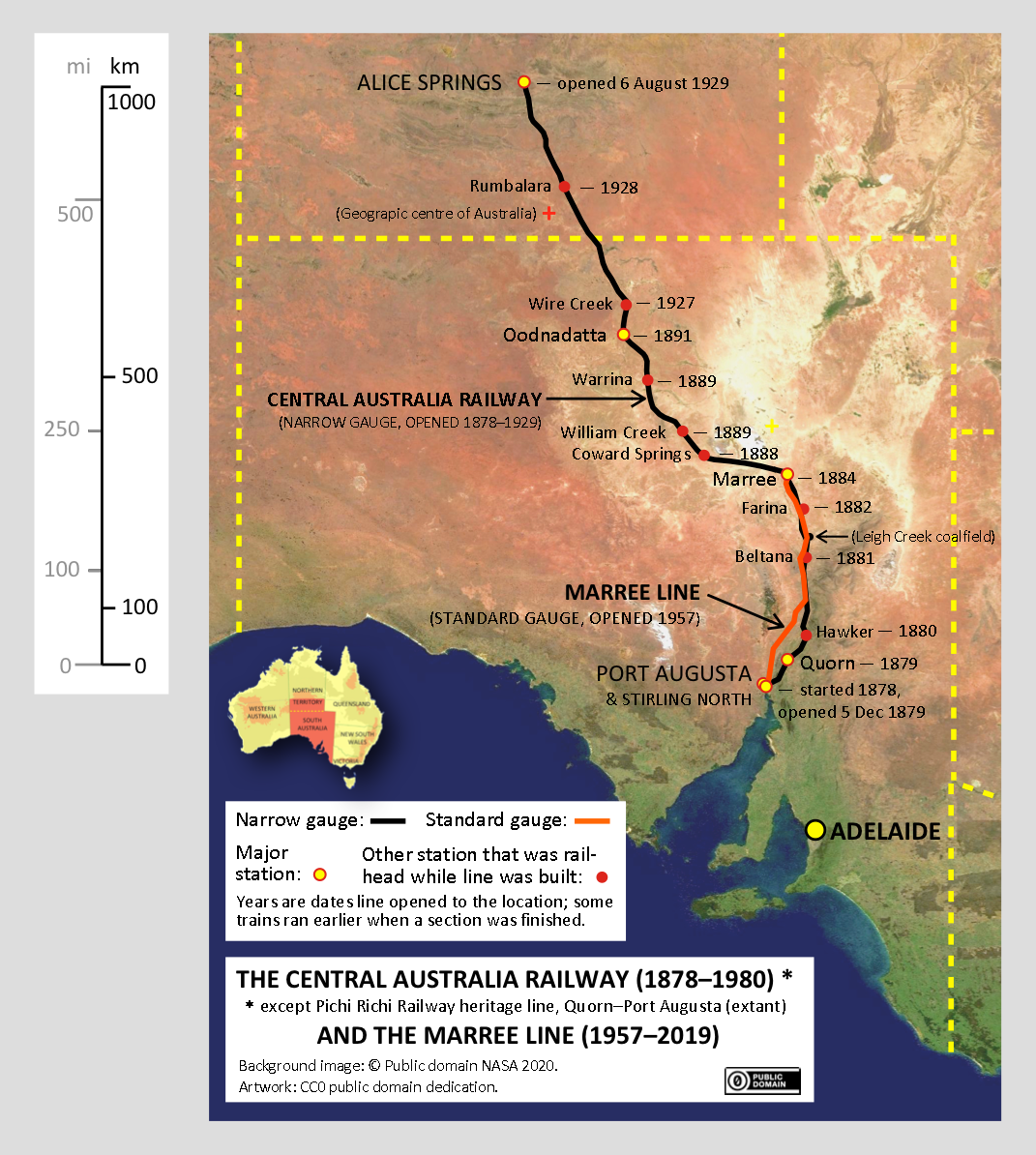
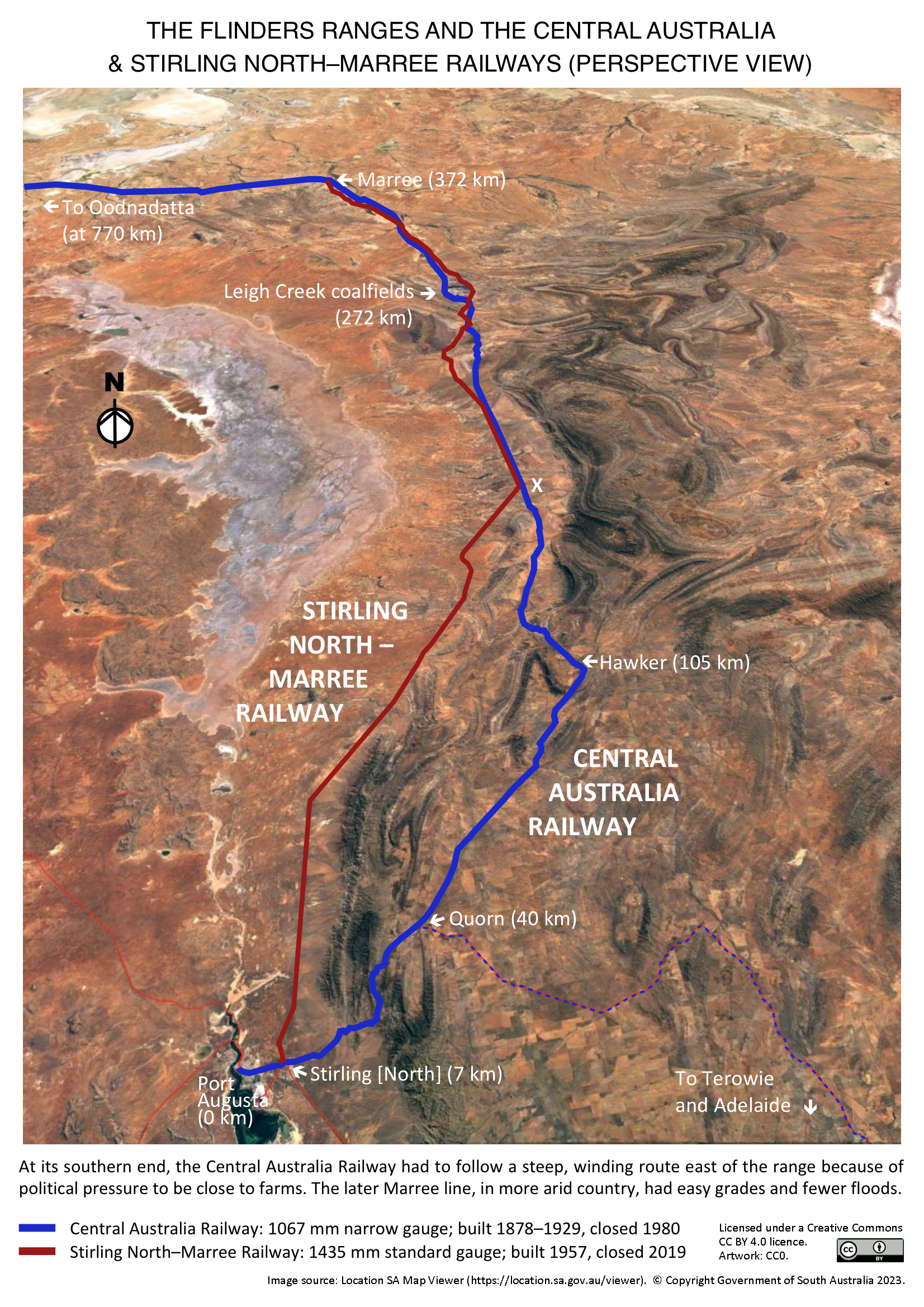

The former Central Australia Railway, which was built between 1878 and 1929 and dismantled in 1980, was a 1241 km (771 mi) 1067 mm narrow gauge railway between Port Augusta and Alice Springs. A standard gauge line duplicated the southern section from Port Augusta to Maree in 1957 on a new nearby alignment. The entire Central Australia Railway was superseded in 1980 after the standard gauge Tarcoola–Alice Springs Railway was opened, using a new route up to 200 km to the west. A small southern section of the original line between Port Augusta and Quorn has been preserved and is operated as the Pichi Richi Railway.

== Naming ==
The line became known as the Central Australia Railway when the Commonwealth Railways took it over from the South Australian Railways in 1929. Before then, it was known by several names, in part because the northern end point had not been determined, funding being intermittent. Government acts and the press used a number of terms prior to construction including:

- Port Augusta Railway
- Northern Railway
- Great Northern Railway
- Port Augusta to (far) North Railway.

After construction, railway was referred to as:

- Port Augusta-Oodnadatta railway
- North–South Railway in possible anticipation to extend the line to Darwin.

It has also often been referred to as the Great Northern Railway in the 1890s and into the twentieth century. The most southern part of the line between Port Augusta and Quorn is now referred to as the Pichi Richi Tourist Railway.

Another colloquial name used was The Ghan, after the passenger train that utilised the line. It is suggested that The 'Ghan name is in recognition of the Afghan Cameleers that plied their trade in the area well before the railway; however, see The Ghan (Etymology) for alternatives. This colloquial term for the railway appears to have been widely in use from at least the early 1930s; it may have been in use prior to this. The new Adelaide–Darwin railway line initially used The New Ghan as a trading name. It has now reverted to The Ghan, relegating the original line name colloquially as The Old Ghan.

== History ==
Timeline of the Great Northern Railway / Central Australia Railway
Year	Date	Event
1853		First recorded wagon (hauled by bullocks) through Pichi Richi Pass.
1854		Town of Port Augusta surveyed.
1854	18 May	Goolwa to Port Elliot horse-drawn railway opens.
1854		South Australian Government begins program of railway construction.
1856	19 April	Adelaide to Port Adelaide line opens.
1857	5 October	Adelaide–Gawler line opens.
1857		Surveyor-General Goyder inspects construction of the road through Pichi Richi Pass.
1862		Act of Parliament passed, offering land grants in exchange for constructing a railway north from Port Augusta. Goyder advises that a railway through Pichi Richi Pass is "not practical".
1863		Control of the Northern Territory is handed from New South Wales to South Australia.
1864		SA Parliament passes the Waste Lands Act granting licences to squatters on northern pastoral lands.
1865–1866		Severe drought in SA.
1865		Goyder defines the boundary of arable land in SA.
1869		Government passes the Strangways Act allowing credit to purchase farming land in the north of SA.
1870	29 August	Adelaide and Burra Railway opens.
1870		Government offer of land in return for constructing northern railway.
1870		Survey for Port Augusta and Northern Railway looking at alternative routes. Completion of Overland Telegraph Line to Darwin.
1873–1877		Boom agricultural years in Mid-North.
1877		Construction starts on the Port Augusta and Government Gums Railway. Equipment stockpiled at Port Augusta.
1878	18 January	Official "turning of the first sod" of the Port Augusta and Government Gums Railway at Port Augusta by state governor Sir William Jervois.
1879	19 June	First shipment by rail from Quorn to Port Augusta.
1879	15 December	Line opens from Port Augusta to Quorn.
1880	28 June	Line opens from Quorn to Hawker.
1880–1882		Drought conditions cause crop failures in Willochra area.
1881	1 July	Railway opens to Beltana.
1882	18 April	First train arrives at Farina (previously named Government Gums).
1882	17 May	Official opening of the Port Augusta and Government Gums Railway and Terowie to Quorn Railway at Quorn by Governor Sir William Jervois.
1884	13 January	Hawker Railway Station burns down. Replaced by current stone station building.
1884	7 February	Railway extended to Hergott Springs by contractors Moorhouse, Robinson and Jesser.
1885–1891		Deviations constructed in Pichi Richi Pass to ease curves.
1887		Public meeting in Adelaide called for bridges at Strangways Springs and Peake Creek to be purchased locally rather than cheaper English bridges. Cost difference was £11,944 v. £8145.
1888	1 February	Railway extended to Coward Springs by Engineer-in-Chief South Australia, using unemployment relief labour.
1889	1 June	Railway extended to William Creek. More sharp curves in Pichi Richi Pass eased by deviations.
1889	1 November	Railway extended to Warrina by SA Government unemployment relief scheme.
1891	7 January	Railway extended to Oodnadatta by SA Government unemployment relief scheme.
1891–1892		Severe recession in Australia.
1892	17 December	Y class loco no. 141 is allocated to the Northern Division of the SAR. (It was later modified to a Yx class and is now at the Pichi Richi Railway.)
1904	2 May	Tenders called for extension of railway from Oodnadatta to Pine Creek, Northern Territory. The contract was not signed: the federal government blocked the employment of Chinese labourers.
1911	1 January	South Australia hands the Northern Territory to the Commonwealth Government, including the Great Northern Railway. The South Australian Railways continues to provide trains and staff for the time being, with the Commonwealth bearing losses and liabilities.
1911	January	Loco Y141 derails near Brachina due to washout, killing the driver.
1912	14 September	Construction starts on the Trans-Australian Railway from Port Augusta to Kalgoorlie.
1914	28 March	Boiler of Y class locomotive explodes at Cudmore Hill near Port Augusta.
1914	28 July	World War I starts.
1917	17 October	Opening of the Trans-Australian Railway.
1918		Hergott Springs renamed as Marree.
1918	11 November	End of World War I. Global influenza pandemic follows.
1921	4 June	SAR rolling stock, including the "Coffee Pot", sold to Commonwealth Railways.
1923		Sleeping car introduced between Terowie and Marree. An SAR employee at Quorn jokingly names the train to Oodnadatta The Afghan Express, which is eventually shortened to The Ghan.
1925	June	Delivery of the first two NM class steam engines (NM15 and 16).
1926	1 January	Commonwealth Railways takes over operation of the Great Northern Railway and names it the Central Australia Railway.
1926		Alternative routes considered for extension to Stuart.
1926		Algebuckina bridge strengthened for NM class locos. Deviation used, but soon damaged twice by flood waters.
1927	21 January	34-kilometre (21-mile) line built from Oodnadatta to Wire Creek, which becomes construction base for the 439-kilometre (273-mile) extension to Stuart.
1928	23 December	Opening of line to Rumbalara railhead.
1929	2 August	Line completed to Stuart. First passenger train hauled into Stuart by NM35 on 6 August.
1929		Commonwealth Railways changes name of Stuart railway station to Alice Springs.
1930	17 January	Finke River bridge destroyed by floodwaters. Traffic suspended for seven weeks until March 1930. Deviation built downstream.
1930		Completion of mechanical engineering workshops at Port Augusta.
1937	26 July	Standard-gauge line between Port Pirie and Port Augusta completed.
1938		Major flooding north of Oodnadatta. Railway closed for several weeks.
1939	3 September	World War II commences.
1942		New loco shed and Kennicott water treatment plant constructed at Quorn. New sheds also built at Marree, Oodnadatta and Alice Springs.
1943	19 February	Head-on collision at Strangways between two freight trains. No fatalities.
1944	11 May	Crash near Copley. Freight train hauled by NM25 runs into the rear of troop train; four soldiers killed.
1944		Leigh Creek coal trains start. Coal goes via Quorn (narrow gauge) then Terowie to Adelaide (broad gauge).
1945	September	World War II ends.
1946		Major flooding. Food dropped by air to stranded Ghan.
1949		Ghan sleeping car service suspended due to coal shortages.
1949	15 December	Commonwealth Railways commissioner recommends construction of a standard-gauge railway from Stirling North to Leigh Creek.
1951		Diesel-electric locos ordered (NSU class).
1951	27 August	Construction commences on Brachina to Leigh Creek standard-gauge line.
1952	4 July	Royal Commission report recommends Brachina to Stirling North route west of the Flinders Ranges for new standard-gauge line, bypassing Quorn and Hawker.
1954		Playford power station opens at Port Augusta. Narrow-gauge coal trains operate through Pichi Richi Pass.
1954	June	Arrival of first NSU diesel locos.
1954	24 June	First diesel-hauled Ghan departs Quorn hauled by NSU 51 and 52.
1954	November	Arrival of first NDH "Gloucester" railcars to operate Port Augusta to Marree passenger service.
1955	14 February	Destruction of Hookina Bridge by floodwaters.
1955	28 May	Standard-gauge line to Brachina completed. "Piggyback" trains commence on 4 June for coal and cattle trains (until 25 June 1956).
1956	17 May	Standard-gauge line completed to Leigh Creek coalfield.
1956	10 July	New schedule has southbound Ghan passengers transferring to standard-gauge railcars at Brachina.
1956	13 August	Last narrow-gauge Ghan through Pichi Richi Pass. Passengers travel by standard-gauge train from Port Augusta to Copley. Copley becomes transfer station for freight and passengers.
1956	4 October	Narrow-gauge line Hawker to Copley closed. Rails then lifted.
1957	29 June	Standard-gauge railhead reaches Marree.
1957	27 July	Official opening of the standard-gauge line to Marree.
1958	26 March	Narrow-gauge line between Copley and Marree closed. Rails then lifted. Marree becomes transfer station between standard-gauge and narrow-gauge lines.
1961		Pedirka sandhills deviation completed.
1965	24 April	First NT class diesel-electric locos in service. All were later transferred to Darwin; they returned south after the North Australia Railway closed in 1976.
1967	February & March	Severe flooding. Low-level Finke River bridge destroyed.
1968		Saltia bridge in Pichi Richi Pass hit by over-height truck.
1969	29 January	Last passenger service to Quorn from Terowie.
1970	8 January	Last regular freight service between Quorn and Hawker.
1970	November	Survey of Tarcoola to Alice Springs line commences.
1971	28 April	NJ diesel-electric locomotives introduced. NJ1 named Ben Chifley.
1972	17 September	Stirling North to Hawker line officially closed.
1973	July	Pichi Richi Railway Preservation Society formed.
1974		Second low-level bridge at Finke destroyed by floodwaters.
1974	20 July	First steam-hauled train on the new Pichi Richi Railway.
1975	12 April	Construction commences on Tarcoola to Alice Springs line. First sod turned by Prime Minister Gough Whitlam at Tarcoola.
1975	1 July	Commonwealth Railways becomes Australian National Railways (ANR), a new federal government agency.
1978	1 April	ANR takes over the South Australian Railways and Tasmanian Government Railways.
1980	9 October	Tarcoola–Alice Springs line opens; first standard-gauge train northward.
1980	25 November	Last narrow-gauge Ghan from Marree to Alice Springs. Locos NJ3 and NJ6.
1980	11 December	First standard-gauge Ghan to Alice Springs.
1980	December	Last revenue train to Oodnadatta.
1981	17 October	Last train on Peterborough–Quorn line, by Steamtown Peterborough.
1982		Rails between Alice Springs and Marree removed.
1987	10 June	Standard-gauge line from Leigh Creek to Marree closed and rails lifted.
1995	4 June	Standard-gauge line between Adelaide and Melbourne opens.
2001	17 July	Construction commences on Alice Springs–Darwin line.
2001	September	Pichi Richi Railway extended to Port Augusta.
2003	18 September	Standard-gauge line reaches Darwin.
2004	3 February	First standard-gauge Ghan arrives at Darwin from Adelaide.
2007	19 January	Wirreanda Creek bridge at Gordon destroyed by floodwaters.
2013		Abminga railway station area listed in state heritage list.
2016	27 April	Last coal train from Leigh Creek to Port Augusta.
2016	May	Port Augusta power stations closed and demolished. Port Augusta to Leigh Creek railway mothballed.

=== Initial proposal ===
From the proposal for a line heading north of Port Augusta to turning the first sod in 1878 took 18 years and the process was referred to by the press as one "which has so far failed to extend itself out of the region of nebulous ideas.".

The key issues reported at the time were as follows.

==== Cost benefits ====
Significant debate about the cost delayed and eventually altered the final design. The costs were significant for the South Australian colony and there was rigorous debate over that period. Mineral extraction was touted as the key benefit, with farming and passenger traffic deemed by many as being uneconomic alone although others suggest the key products were 'wool, station stores, and copper' in that order. The cost per kilometre was set in the Acts which precluded more expensive options.

==== Gauge and maximum speed ====
There was fierce debate about the gauge of the line, the maximum weight to be carried and maximum speed as all three dictated the cost.

==== Route and end point ====
A multitude of routes and end-points were nominated with over a dozen potential routes explored, most of these to the north. End points that were discussed included Government Gums (Farina, South Australia (320 km), Yudnamutana, South Australia (390 km) and Beltana (232 km). The 1867 Act stated that the line would be 200 miles from Port Augusta. Newspapers of the time did mention extending the line to Port Darwin although this was not gazetted in Parliament.

==== Funding: public or private sector ====
The South Australian Railways, as the agent of the colonial government, wanted to build the line, and there were others who thought that investors, predominantly from the United Kingdom, would offer better value for money. The South Australian Railways developed a trial called the Northern Extension Railway to Burra to test the engineering capabilities.

== Legislation ==
The following Acts were passed by the parliament of South Australia and, after federation in 1901, the Australian parliament.

Parliamentary Acts associated with the Central Australia Railway
Year	Act	Juris-diction	Key provisions
1862	The Northern Railway Act 1862	SA	Carriage of passengers, merchandise and produce between Port Augusta and some point (not less than 100 miles) northwards.; First 20 miles to be completed in two years, remainder in five years.; Speed was to be a "rate of not less than eight miles an hour for the whole distance travelled, including stoppages (luggage trains excepted)".; Propulsion was to be either horse or steam locomotive.; Two passenger and two goods trains were to be provided at least twice a week, one way, for the entire length.; All military, police, and other forces, when proceeding on duty, and all public mails and public stores, or stores belonging to a public department, were to be conveyed in the ordinary trains free of charge.; in the event of war or civil commotion, the whole of the resources of the railway were to be placed at the disposal of the government at the charges actually incurred.; The company would be entitled to a grant of the land traversed by the railway for a breadth of two chains, and to grants of contiguous blocks of land up to 20 square miles at the rate of two square miles for every mile traversed by the railway.
1864	The Port Augusta and Northern Railway Act 1864	SA	Similar to the 1862 Act.; Purpose was "to encourage the formation of railways northwards from Port Augusta, or Port Paterson, with a branch line between those ports".; Land grant increased to four square kilometres with some limitations.
1864	The Sale of Railways Act 1864	SA	Authorised SA Government to sell any railway or tram line; reflected lack of commitment to financing railways in South Australia.
1867	The Port Augusta and Northern Railway Act 1867	SA	Length of railway was extended to at least 200 miles from Port Augusta; costs "shall not exceed 3750 pounds for every mile"; land grants removed.; Gauge "shall be five feet and three inches".; Horse drawn or steam engine propulsion were still alternatives.
1876	Port Augusta and Government Gums Railway Act 1876	SA	Gauge set to narrow gauge "three feet six inches"; cost was not to exceed 3750 pounds per mile.; Passenger trains not to exceed 20 miles per hour; other trains, 14 miles per hour.; Route defined between Port Augusta and Government Gums (Farina).
1883	Palmerston and Pine Creek Railway Act 1883	SA	Specified a narrow gauge of "three feet six inches" for the Palmerston and Pine Creek railway (i.e., what was to become the northern part of the Central Australia Railway).
1902	The Transcontinental Railway Act 1902	SA	Authorised construction of a railway from Oodnadatta, South Australia to Pine Creek.
1907	The Northern Territory Surrender Act 1907	SA	Paved the way for annexing the Northern Territory to the new federal Australian Government from South Australia.; Authorised South Australia's transferring the Central Australia Railway and Palmerston and Pine Creek Railway to the federal Australian Government.
1910	Northern Territory Acceptance Act 1910	Cth	Federal legislation to confirm the 1907 Act. Specified a line from Port Darwin to be constructed to meet the Port Augusta (Central Australia) Railway at the South Australian border and be referred to as The Transcontinental Railway. No start or completion date included.
1949	Railway Standardization (South Australia) Agreement Act 1949	Cth	Authorised a Commonwealth–SA agreement for railway gauges in SA to be converted to standard gauge on grounds of defence and development of Australia, facilitation of interstate trade and commerce, and to secure maximum efficiency and economy in railway operation – financed 70 per cent Commonwealth, 30 per cent SA. In a supplementary provision in the Schedule, the Commonwealth undertook to standardise the Central Australia Railway and North Australia Railway and to build a new standard-gauge railway to close the Alice Springs–Birdum gap.
1950	Brachina to Leigh Creek North Coalfield Railway Act 1950	Cth	Authorised an agreement between the Commonwealth and SA for the federal government to construct a railway "as soon as practicable" from Brachina to Leigh Creek North Coalfield; acknowledged that the limited capacity of the narrow-gauge line to transport coal to the impending Port Augusta power station necessitated a standard-gauge railway. (The Act provided only for 60 per cent of the required distance from the coalfield to Port Augusta; objection by the South Australian Government to the alignment of routes further south led to a royal commission being appointed.)
1950	Port Augusta to Alice Springs Railway (Alteration of Route) Act 1950	Cth	Appointed a royal commission to investigate which of two routes were more suitable for the construction of a standard gauge railway between Stirling North and Brachina. Specific factors ordered to be taken into account included the proposed conversion to standard gauge of the railway from Port Augusta to Alice Springs; the cost of construction, maintenance and comparative economics of the respective routes; the probability of increased tonnage of coal hauled from Leigh Creek and the consequential financial results on the cost of constructing and operating railways on the respective routes. Consideration of "any break-of-gauge station required at the northern terminus of the standard gauge line" was explicitly excluded.
1952	Stirling North to Brachina Railway Act 1952	Cth	Authorised the Commonwealth Railways to construct a standard-gauge railway from Stirling North to Brachina. Specified that the total cost of this railway and the previously authorised Brachina to Leigh Creek North Coalfield railway, including the cost of rolling stock, was not to exceed 11 million pounds. (This Act provided for the remaining 40 per cent of the distance from the coalfield to Port Augusta, the SA Government having accepted the findings of the royal commission, causing a delay of 24 months.)
1954	Leigh Creek North Coalfield to Marree (Conversion to Standard Gauge) Act 1954	Cth	Authorised the standard-gauge line to be extended to Marree, subject to agreement by the SA Government. Specified that the total cost of this railway and the two railways previously authorised was not to exceed 12.241 million pounds.
1974	Tarcoola to Alice Springs Railway Act 1974	Cth	Approved an agreement between the Australian Government and the Government of South Australia to build a standard-gauge line, well to the west of the Central Australia Railway, from the existing Trans-Australian Railway at Tarcoola to Alice Springs. Stipulated maximum expenditure of $145 million.
1997	Alice Springs to Darwin Railway Act 1997	SA	Committed South Australian Government funding up to $125 million (plus $25 million if necessary for contingencies, and $26.5 million to underwrite any loans) to the Alice Springs to Darwin railway. Included the South Australian and Northern Territory governments' acknowledgement of various mutual obligations.

== Construction ==
Design, construction, as well as a hiatus, occurred in four periods distinct under both South Australian and Federal Australian Governments over a fifty-year period.

=== Initial design and route ===
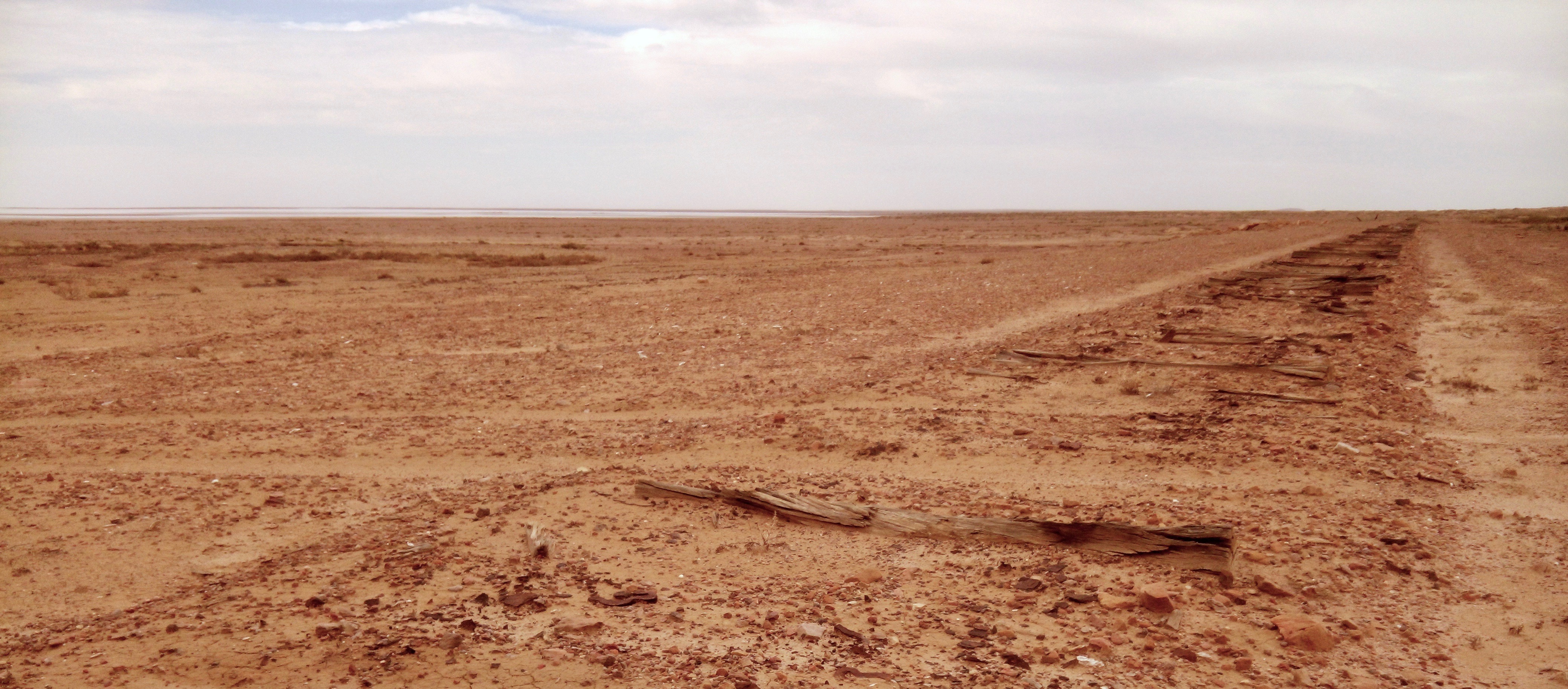
Remaining trackbed of the Central Australia Railway near Lake Eyre South after the rails were lifted in 1981. Much of the 1241 km (771 mi) railway was laid on bare earth without ballast.

Around 1871, there was general agreement between Robert C. Patterson, Assistant Engineer (report writer), H. C. Mais, (Engineer-in-Chief) and Surveyor General. George Goyder (creator of the Goyder line of rainfall) about the length and route of the railway. All three could not see going further north than Beltana (232 km) due to rain fall and environment, The two options out of Port Augusta were the Western Plains and the Pichi Richi routes. The Pichi Richi route, while more expensive, offered access to the farmland to the west.

An extensive permanent survey was conducted circa 1876 and the final route mapped to Government Gums due to the water available at the terminus. The length was to be "198 miles 66.92 chains", and the route consisted of "no less than 64 bridges, ranging in length from 20 feet to 740 feet, 470 flood-openings from 10 to 40 feet wide, 550 culverts from 2 feet 6 inches to 10 feet wide, 61 pipe-drains, and 14 water courses".

=== Initial build to Farina (Government Gums) ===
The first sod was turned at Port Augusta on 18 January 1878 and took until 1882 to reach Government Gums (320 km), 1884 Maree (372 km), 1888 Coward Springs (501 km) and finally Oodnadatta in 1891 (770 km). Construction was by South Australian Railways as a 1,067 mm (3 ft 6 in) narrow gauge railway.

=== Cessation of work ===
Between 1891 and 1926, the railway line was not extended. Discussion occurred about whether the existing line should be extended or a 1435 mm (4 ft 8 1/2 in) standard-gauge railway from Tarcoola should be initiated. The South Australian Railways were transferred to the Australian federal government on 1 January 1911, but because the federal government at that stage did not possess a railway department, the South Australian Railways continued running the service until 1 January 1926. In 1926, Commonwealth Railways took over the running and commenced planning for extending the railway line north.

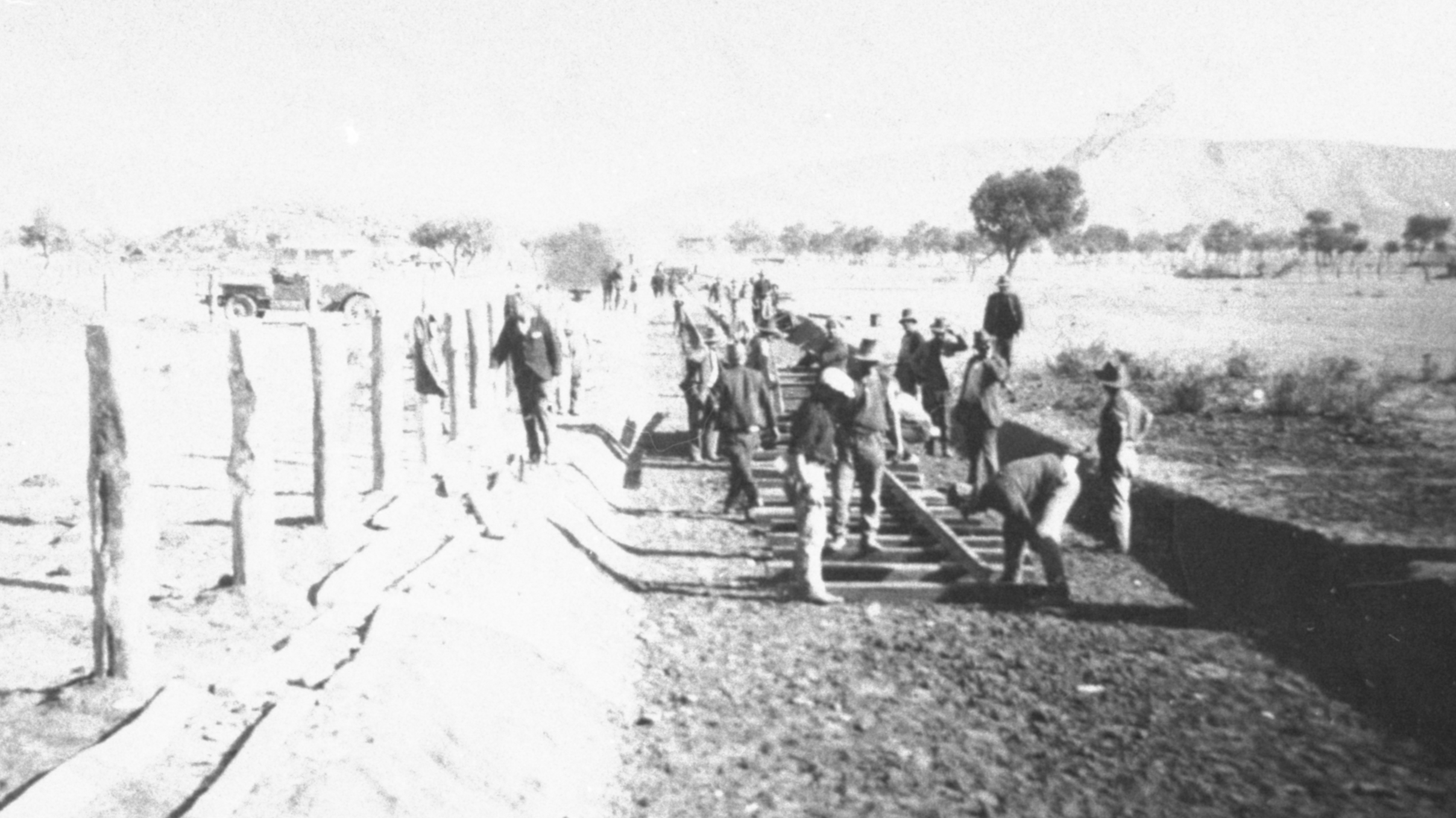
Work on the final section leading into Alice Springs, 1929

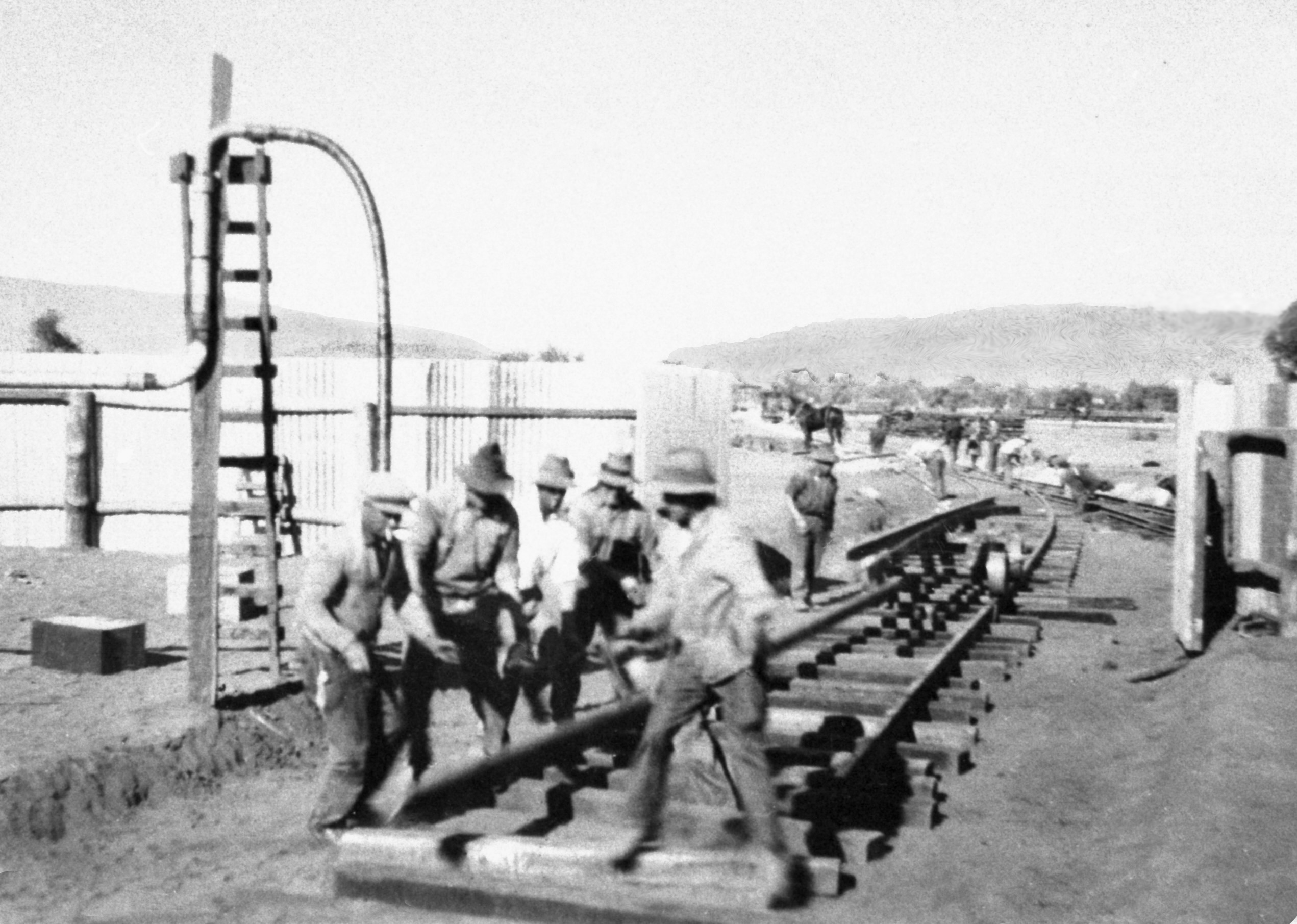
Work on the final section, where is connected to the Shell Depot in Alice Springs, 1929

=== Completion from Oodnadatta to Alice Springs ===
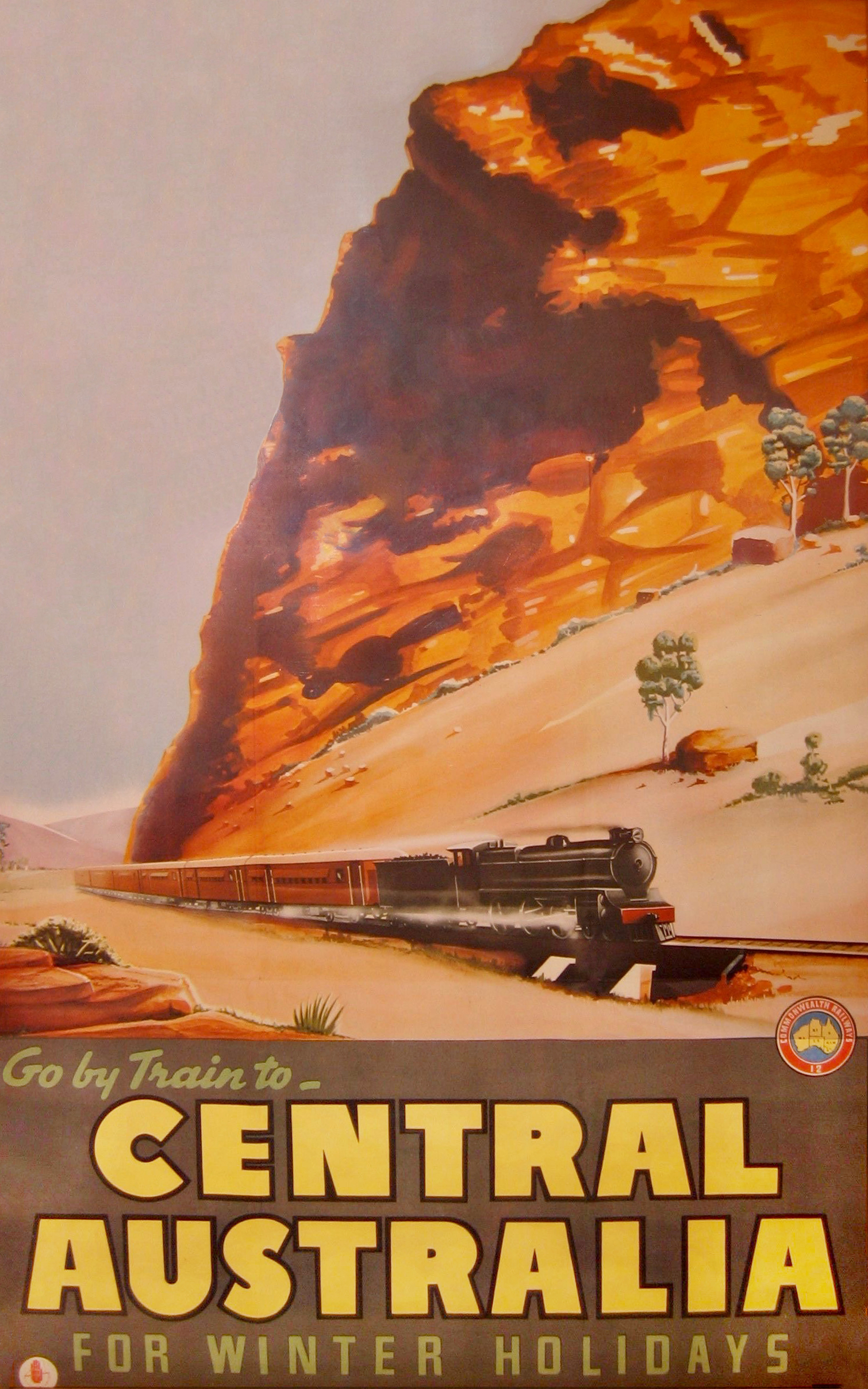
A Commonwealth Railways poster of the 1940s advertising train travel to winter holidays in Central Australia. The scene is Heavitree Gap, or Ntaripe in the Arrernte language, 3.5 km (2 mi) south of Alice Springs railway station. Both the size of the cliff and the speed of the train bore no connection with reality.

Extending the line from Oodnadatta to Alice Springs commenced around 1926 and was completed on 6 August 1929.

The Northern Territory Act (Cth 1910) required the building of a north–south railway although no date was specified. Two unballasted routes were shortlisted with a standard gauge line from Kingoonya to Alice Springs estimated at 4.5m pounds and the 1.7m pound narrow gauge extension from Oodnadatta to Alice Springs. The 270 miles 65 chain extension was passed after a number of debates in Federal Parliament.

Railway workers were paid 5 pounds, 8 shillings a week and a request for this to be raised to 6 pounds per week was refused by Sir John Quick in the Federal Arbitration Court on 11 March 1927.

The first train consisted of 12 carriages including Mail and Fruit vans. There were 60 first class and 60 second class passengers and left on 5 August 1929 however an official ceremony to be attended by the Prime Minister was cancelled due to the cost of running a special train.

== Operations ==
=== Conditions ===
The tortuously curving narrow-gauge line between Marree and Alice Springs was notoriously prone to delays, often caused by flash floods washing away bridges and tracks. Some track was laid on sand without ballast, and wood sleepers were used, serving as food for termites, causing unstable tracks.

=== Floods ===
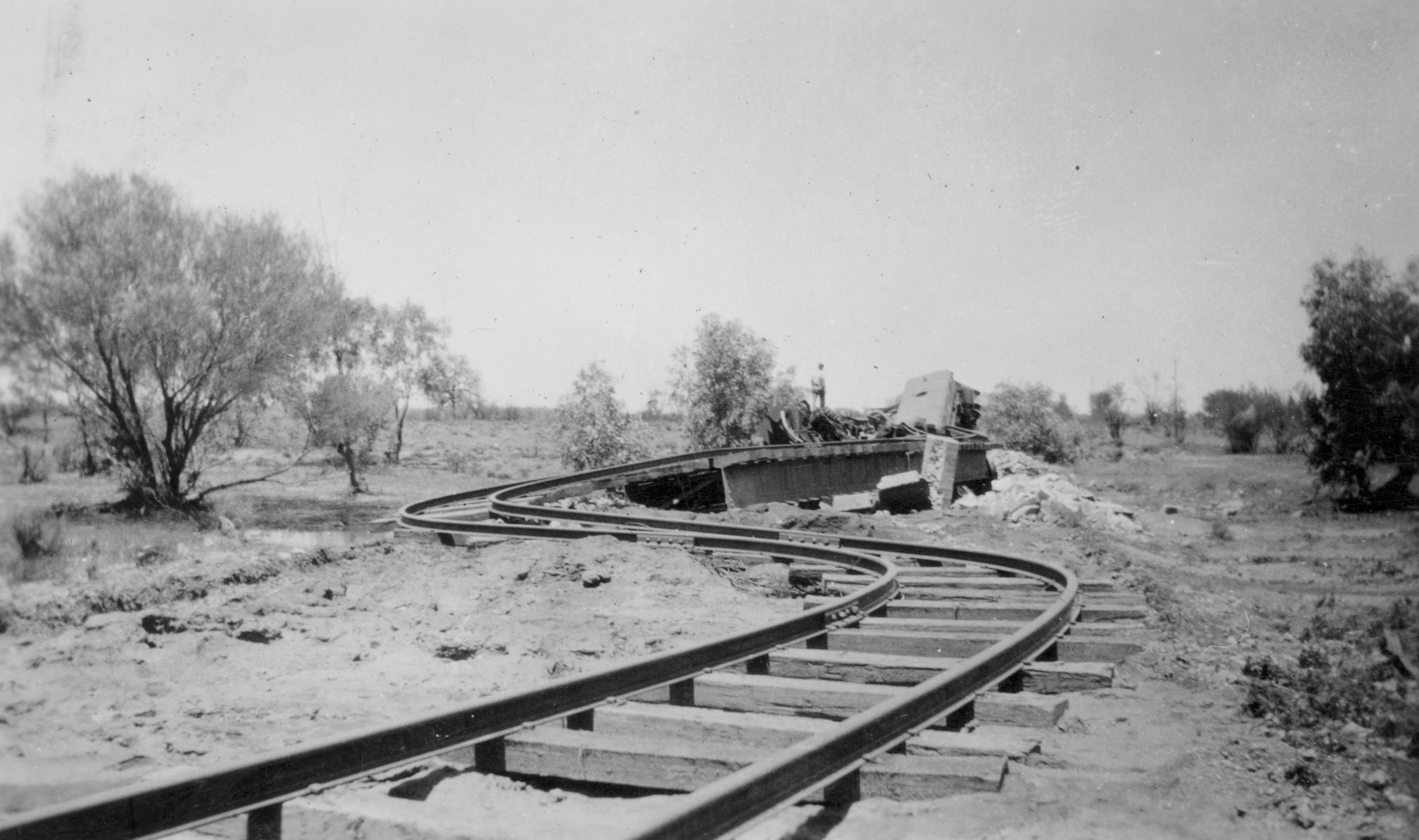
An example of the severity of floods on the railway in 1937: this bridge was displaced by tens of metres/yards

The choice of route through the most arid regions of Australia was influenced above all by the need for water for steam locomotives. Since time immemorial, Aboriginal people had followed a chain of artesian springs and waterholes to sustain them when carrying ochre from the Far North of South Australia to trading places in the south. The explorer John McDouall Stuart followed a similar route during several expeditions between 1858 and 1862. The route taken by the Overland Telegraph ten years later, to which Stuart is believed to have given attention during his travels, was very similar. When the railway route was surveyed, it was hardly surprising that it followed the reliable sources of water. The downside – an endless source of frustration for the railway maintainers – was that washouts occurred at some locations almost every year. When heavy rains fell inland in New South Wales and Queensland, gigantic "flash floods" came down normally dry riverbeds; bridges, embankments and other earthworks gave way under the onslaught. All but the largest bridge were severely damaged or washed away entirely, and miles of track were washed out – almost every year at some locations.

Flood events on the Great Northern Railway / Central Australia Railway
Date	Location	Event
1882 – March	Flinders Ranges	Washouts throughout
1889 – January	Farina to Marree	Washouts throughout
1890 – January	Hawker to Beltana	Washouts throughout
1903 – December	Farina	Washouts delay trains in the Farina area
1904 – February	North of Parachilna	Track washed away; two days' delay
1911 – February	Brachina	Train entered the creek south of station after rains. Driver of locomotive Y141 killed.
1914 – January	Entire line	Major washouts throughout
1915	Brachina	Bridge destroyed
1917 – January	Entire line	Washouts
1918 – January	Near Bopeechee	Line cut by floodwaters
1919 – February	Farina to Marree	Washouts
1926 – March	Copley to Farina; Oodnadatta region; Algebuckina	Widespread rain caused damage in various parts of Central Australia. A deviation at Algebuckina River was washed out twice while the bridge was being strengthened.
1929 – December	Throughout, especially Marree and northward	More than 450 miles (720 kilometres) of track damaged by heavy rain after a seven-year drought; "unparalleled in the history of the railway"
1930 – February	Quorn to Marree; Finke and northward	Services suspended 17 January to 6 March after some Finke River bridge piers were carried away and others were damaged. A deviation was put in place to run the line over the river bed.
1930 – October	Oodnadatta to Alice Springs	Many washouts
1931 – April		Many washouts; Hookina Creek bridge damaged by logs
1932 – March	Finke	River crossing closed for 6 days
1933 – November		Damage at various locations
1935 – January		Damage at various locations
1935 – October	Quorn to Parachilna, Ilbunga to Blood's Creek	Washouts
1936 – January	Boolcunda Creek bridge	Bridge badly damaged; track closed for 8 days
1936 – February	Camel Creek near Rodinga; Margaret Creek bridge	Rodinga: a locomotive and three wagons used in repairing tracks after recent floods dived nose-first into Camel Creek after the bridge was undermined. Margaret Creek bridge washed out; large pigsty constructed. Alice Creek bridge destroyed.
1936 – March	Finke	16 people were marooned at Finke River railway crossing, which was 4 feet (1.2 metres) under water; ten washaways were to the south
1936 – May	Willochra to Gordon	Washouts
1937 – February	Willochra	Track subsides, derailing locomotive NM33
1937 – December	Willochra to Beltana	Washouts
1938 – February	Damage at more than 100 locations north of Edward's Creek	Marree Mixed stranded due to flooding further north. Major flooding north of Oodnadatta. Floodwaters nearly 16 feet (4.9 metres) over rails and 2.4 kilometres (1.5 miles) wide at Peake Creek. Finke River 7 feet (2.1 metres) over rails.
1939 – January, February	Hawker, Farina, Finke	Trains held; no train to Alice Springs for 34 days causes food shortage
1939 – June		Flood damage at numerous locations
1940 – January	Oodnadatta to Alice Springs	Washouts
1940 – February	Finke	Finke River floods
1941 – March	Finke	River crossing closed
1944 – February		Severe flooding
1946 – January	Bundooma; Hookina to Parachilna	Washouts caused by 6.8 inches (170 millimetres) of rain; line closed for three weeks, food dropped by air
1946 – February		Railway closed for 23 days. Marree Mixed stranded. The Peake, Alberga, Stevenson, Hamilton and Finke rivers flooded. Food dropped by air.
1947 – February, March	Beresford; Ewaninga to Alice Springs	Alice Springs train marooned at Beresford
1949 – May		Heavy rain and washouts
1950 – February, March	Brachina, Commodore; Farina to Marree	No trains for 3 weeks Quorn to Marree; shortage of coal from Telford Cut coalfields shortages disrupted power supplies
1950 – March	Brachina to Curdimurka	Alberga and Hamilton Rivers flood, making 180 mi (290 km) of line impassable; a coal train was among the trains stranded
1950 – June	Alberga	Alberga and Hamilton Rivers flood
1953 – January	Oodnadatta to Finke	Trains delayed several days
1954 – October	Finke to Bundooma	Numerous washouts
1955 – February	Hookina	Numerous washouts between Willochra and Nilpena. Hookina bridge destroyed. Deviation built in two weeks, then also washed away in July and October 1956.
1956 – July	Pedirka–Ilbunga; Hookina	Railway closed for two days; Hamilton River (Pedirka) and Stevenson Creek (Ilbunga) flooded. Hookina River flood delayed traffic for 36 hours, then another 36 hours five days later. Further floods on 16 October washed the deviation track away and because a new standard-gauge line had been built it was never restored.
1960 – December	Ewaninga	Washaways; track damaged
1961 – April	Finke	Services delayed for 12 days
1963 – May	Oodnadatta area	The Ghan was held up for nearly a week by floods described as "the worst since 1938", and 114 of the 140 passengers were eventually flown from Oodnadatta to Alice Springs on five special flights.
1963 – June	Marree to William Creek; Peake Creek; Alberga River	Extensive flooding and damage. Ghan stuck at William Creek with loco derailed. Ghan passengers airlifted from Oodnadatta.
1967 – February, March	North of Oodnadatta	Major flooding in many locations; track breached in more than 32 places. Low-Level Finke bridge again destroyed. Line closed for 27 days.
1968		Services suspended for three weeks
1974 – January to April	North of Oodnadatta; Lake Eyre	Heavy rains. All roads into Alice Springs closed. Low-level bridge at Finke destroyed. Line closed from 13 January to 16 March. No passenger services until 1 April. Lake Eyre, normally dry, flooded to its deepest in recorded history. On the southern shore of Lake Eyre South, levees were required and the railway was eventually rebuilt on a new embankment.
1981 (post-closure)	Abminga	Rail recovery train stranded at Abminga. Finke River flowing.
2007 (post-closure)	Gordon	Wirreanda Creek bridge destroyed

=== World War II ===
In 1944, it was reported that trains had increased on the line from the normal two a week to 56, whilst the North Australia Railway had increased from one a week to 147. Rolling stock, sidings, marshaling areas and water points for the steam engines were all key issues in increasing traffic on the line.

=== Diesel locomotives ===
The first diesel-electric locomotive entered service in June 1954. It was one of 14 locomotives ordered for both the Central and North Australia Railway. Built by the Birmingham Carriage and Wagon company, the locomotives had a maximum range of about 1130 kilometres (700 miles) and were designed to haul 330 long tons (300 tonnes) at 50 kilometres per hour (31 miles per hour) on level track.

== Film ==
Shortly before the closure of the narrow gauge line in 1980, BBC Television filmed an episode of the television series Great Railway Journeys of the World featuring the original route of the Ghan (and the infamously slow speed of the train).

== Decline, conversion to standard gauge and closure ==
After World War II, the railway line existence became questionable for a number of reasons:

- The railway had a history of extensive flood damage as the original steam engines required access to streams which were prone to floods.
- The track was narrow gauge and not ballasted and thus loads and speeds were both reduced, reducing the profitability of the line.
- Goyder's Line of rainfall (1865), excluding rains in 1865, 1872 and some other years, was shown as being highly accurate with communities and cropping lands north of his line being abandoned after long dry spells. The entire railway is north of this line.
- Trucks and roads were becoming more reliable and utilised in South Australia.
- The 1910 Northern Territory Acceptance Act mandating a railway line between Darwin and Adelaide requiring a standard gauge railway, which would need to be less susceptible to flooding than the existing route designed for diesel-electric engines rather than steam.
- Improved railway engineering and construction methods allowed for improved design.
- The standard gauge upgrade of the southern section of the line from near Port Augusta to Maree placed pressure on the remaining narrow gauge sections that remained opened due to transfer and maintenance costs.

=== Standard gauge line to Marree ===
In 1949, both South Australia and the Federal Government enacted the Railway Standardisation (South Australia) Agreement Act which looked at the upgrade of all lines to standard gauge, including the Central Australia Line. The act was more of an overarching statement rather than a commitment to complete all lines in a set order or time.

The Leigh Creek and Telford Cut Coalfields were first excavated in 1943 following a shortage of coal during World War II and between 1951 and 1954, discussions surrounded two route options to upgrade to standard gauge. Option B2 was upgrading the current line to Telford, the C option was the chosen option which was up to 32 km west of the current line. The South Australian and Federal governments bickered over by-passing the township of Quorn and it was only after a Royal Commission, that the Commonwealth Railways got their way with option C avoiding Quorn and the work commenced on the 255 km line.

The South Australian Government and agriculturists wanted to extend the standard gauge line a further 88 km to Marree. This would reduce the bruising of the cattle and shorten the time to market as well as increase the number of cattle that could be transferred. Transferring livestock at Telford was considered problematic with coal dust and machinery.

The federal minister of transport travelled to the area in mid-1954 and confirmed the extension from Telford Cut to Marree. The cost was set at 1,241,000 pounds, compared to 821,000 pounds to bring the existing line up to an acceptable level including ballasting and possible bridge replacement.

The Minister for Transport, Senator George McLeay and the Commonwealth Railways Commissioner, Mr. P. J. Hannaberry, both stated that they were "strongly in favour" to extend the standard gauge line all the way to Alice Springs in 1952. By April 1954, Hannaberry had changed his mind and stated it was "out of the question".

In 1957, the Marree Railway Line, the new standard gauge line from Stirling North (near Port Augusta) to Marree (372 km from Port Augusta) opened, replacing the existing line via Quorn. This was predominantly for coal to be transferred from the Leigh Creek and Telford Cut Coalfields to the power stations at Stirling North. The line was extended to Marree for cattle to be transported to market from the grazing plains, including around the Birdsville Track.

=== Closures ===
With the new standard gauge Marree Railway Line opened, the narrow gauge line began to close in sections:

- 1957: The section between Brachina (173 km) to Beltana (232 km) is closed in March
- 1957: The section between Leigh Creek (262 km) to Marree (372 km) is closed in July
- 1958: Beltana (232 km) to Leigh Creek (262 km) closed in July.
- 1972: Port Augusta (0 km) to Hawker (105 km) closed.
  - Some sections of the narrow-gauge line remain in operation as the Pichi Richi Railway and the section from Port Augusta to Stirling North was realigned and restored in 2000–2002.
- 1981: The entire narrow gauge line was closed with the section between Marree (372 km) and Alice Springs (1243 km) abandoned, replaced by Tarcoola-Alice Springs line standard gauge line.
- 1987: Standard gauge between Marree and Telford Cut closed.
- 2016: Stirling North-Telford Cut standard gauge line mothballed after power station and mine closure. On 3 December 2016, Chicago Freight Car Leasing Australia began storing wagons in the disused sidings at Stirling North. various rail operators including Bowmans Rail, Sydney Rail Services, One Rail Australia, Southern Shorthaul Railroad and Pacific National have operated trains to and from the sidings for desire or temporary storage of trains and wagons.
- 2018: For a short period between 28 February 2018 & 29 July 2018, Bowmans Rail were operating a section of the former Leigh Creek Line for a few kms to off-load containers used in the construction of the Bungala Solar Farm.
- 2023: Trains now run as required to CFCLA’s (now RailFirst Asset Management) Stirling North Yard including twice in 2023.

== Heritage trail, restoration and preserved sections ==
The old railway route is now a heritage trail.

In 1974, the newly formed Pichi Richi Railway Preservation Society commenced a restoration program, headquartered at Quorn at the picturesque southern end of the railway; Stirling North, near Port Augusta, was the other terminus. It progressively restored and operated the Pichi Richi Railway as a working museum, upgrading track and undertaking preservation of a wide range of South Australian Railways rolling stock and some locomotives, secured against deterioration in the former running sheds. Between 2000 and 2002, the line was extended 12 km (7 mi) to Port Augusta station, running alongside the standard gauge mainline for about half the distance.

In May 2016, traffic ceased on the standard gauge line between Telford Cut coal mine and Port Augusta after the power station at Port Paterson was shut down.

The Farina Restoration Project Group, whose members travel to the former town at agreed periods to work voluntarily, is restoring the small, now-deserted railway township of Farina.

== List of stations, stopping places and localities ==
Stations, stopping places and localities on the Central Australia Railway
For south-to-north sequence, read across. As an indication of settlement today, 2016 census populations of 100 or more are shown as [pop.]. Population figures of early years are not available. Compared with the final decades of the 20th century, the present-day population Port Augusta is higher; Stirling North much higher; Quorn lower; Marree and Oodnadatta much lower; Alice Springs lower.
Port Augusta [pop. 6560]	Port Augusta racetrack	Stirling North [pop. 2670]	Saltia
Woolshed Flat	Pichi Richi	Summit	Quorn [pop. 1230]
Willochra	Gordon	Wilson	Hawker [pop. 340]
Hookina (at Wonoka)	Mern Merna	Edeowie	Brachina
Commodore (originally Meadows)	Parachilna	Nilpena (originally Blackfellow's Creek)	Beltana
Puttapa	Copley (originally Leigh Creek) [pop. 320]	Telford	Lyndhurst
Farina (originally Government Gums)	Wirrawilla	Mundowdna	Marree (originally Hergott) [pop. 100]
Callanna	Wangianna	Alberrie Creek	Bopeechee
Lake Eyre	Stuart's Creek (Curdimurka)	Margaret Siding	Coward Springs
Beresford	Strangways Springs	Irrappatana	William Creek
Douglas	Anna Creek	Box Creek	Boorthanna
Duff Creek	Edward's Creek	Warrina	Peake Creek
Algebuckina	Mount Dutton	North Creek	Oodnadatta [pop. 200]
Todmorten	Wire Creek	Alberga	Macumba
Mount Sarah	Mount Rebecca	Pedirka	Mount Emery
Illbunga	Bloods Creek	Abminga	Wall Creek
Duffield	Crown Point	Finke (now Aputula) [pop. 170]	Musgrave
Rumbalara	Mount Squire	Engoordina	Bundooma
Maryvale	Rodinga	Deep Well	Ooraminna
Mount Polhill	Ewaninga	Mount Ertiva	MacDonnell
Heavitree	Alice Springs [pop. 24,750]	Alice Springs Abattoirs	

== See also ==
- Adelaide–Darwin railway line
- Marree railway line
- North Australia Railway
- Pichi Richi Railway
- The Ghan
