= Farina railway station =

Railway station in Farina, Australia

Farina
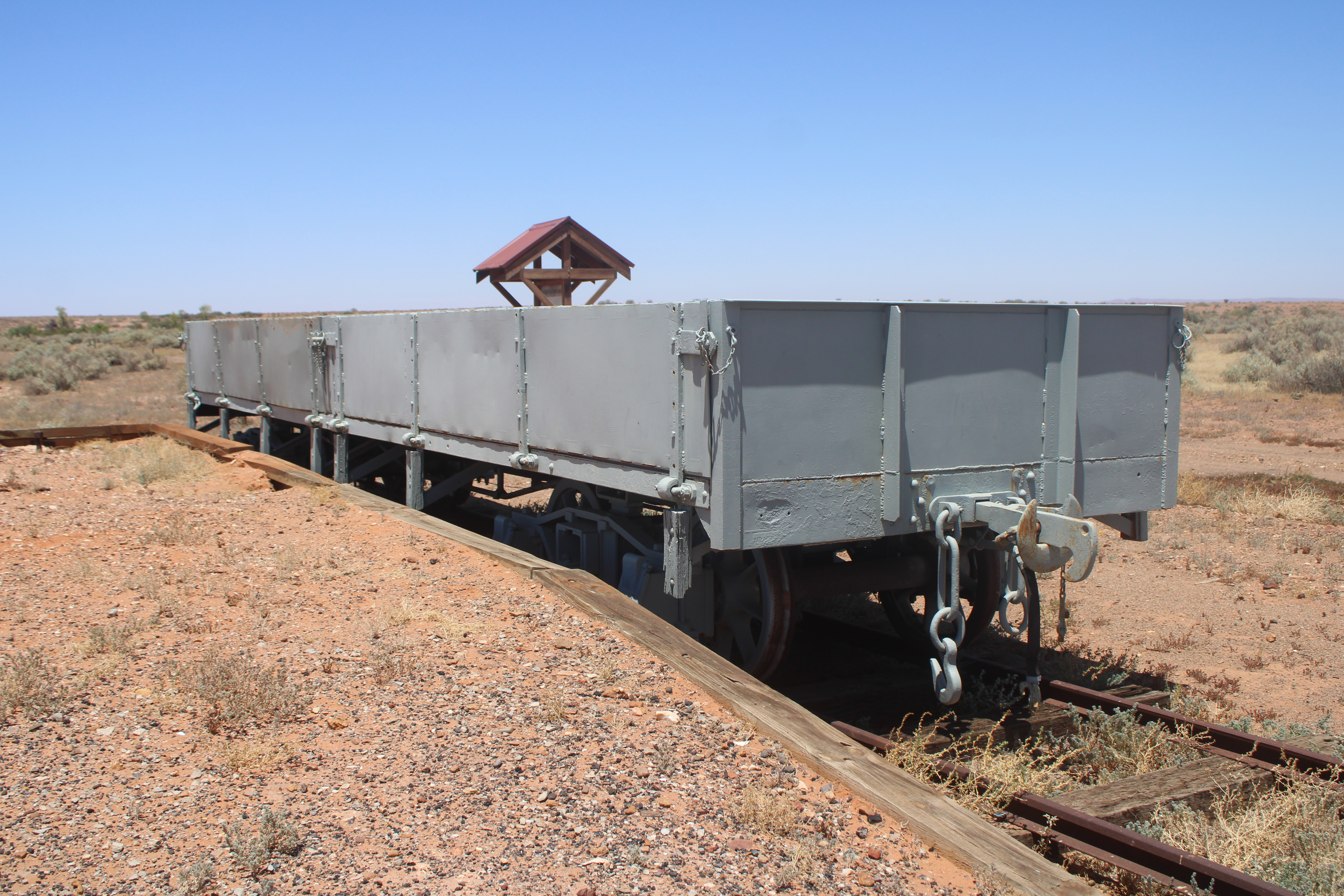
- A preserved narrow-gauge bogie open wagon next to the rebuilt goods platform at Farina in 2021

General information
- Location: Farina, South Australia
- Coordinates: 30.06°S 138.28°E
- Operator: South Australian Railways 1882–1926; Commonwealth Railways 1926–1975; Australian National 1975–1987
- Lines: Central Australia Railway 1884–1987; Marree railway line 1957–1987.
- Distance: 650 kilometres (400 miles) from Adelaide railway station
- Platforms: 1 (ground level)

Other information
- Status: Closed

History
- Opened: 22 May 1884
- Closed: 10 June 1987
- Rebuilt: 27 July 1957

Services
Preceding station	Commonwealth Railways	Following station
Copley towards Port Augusta	Central Australia Railway	Marree towards Alice Springs
Copley towards Stirling North	Marree railway line	Marree Terminus
Location

Farina railway station, in the South Australian outback, was completed in 1882 when the narrow-gauge Central Australia Railway progressed towards Marree. In 1957, a new standard-gauge line, called the Marree railway line, was constructed in parallel with the narrow-gauge line, which was closed in 1981; traffic ceased on the standard-gauge line in 2019.

== History ==
In 1878, construction commenced at Port Augusta on the Great Northern Railway, a lightly constructed line expected to be about 200 kilometres (120 miles) long, with the prospect of becoming a south–to–north transcontinental railway partly due to mineral discoveries in the Flinders Ranges and good rainfall in the Far North convincing farmers to settle there. Farina (known as Government Gums at the time) was picked as the terminus for the railway, though it was viewed by a lot of the general public as the first section of a railway to Darwin. The railway reached Quorn in 1879, Hawker in 1880, Beltana in 1881, and finally reached Government Gums in 1882. The Governor of South Australia, Sir William Jervois, declared the line to Government Gums open on 22 May 1882.

When the railway arrived, the township was re-named Farina (Latin: farina, ground wheat, flour) since the area was expected to be good for growing crops. However, the good rainfall experienced at the time ended a few years after settlement, putting an end to settlers' belief that crops could be sustained in the region because "Rain follows the plough". Despite the lack of crops, the railway helped carry other commodities, including sheep, wool, and cattle. Farina remained as the railhead for 2 years until the railway was extended to Marree in 1884, helping to transport more livestock and making Farina a through station. Farina boasted a livestock loading facility that saw thousands of sheep and cattle being loaded on to trains each year. However, after severe droughts and the closure of the nearby mineral mines, the town declined.

A new standard gauge line to Marree replaced the existing narrow gauge one in 1957, and for a short time, the town was one of the few where the 2 railways crossed over. Livestock continued to be loaded at Farina, though the town was eventually completely abandoned in 1980. Goods trains continued passing through the town until 1987, when the railway closed between Marree and Telford Cut. The last passenger train was a special tour by Train Tour Promotions using a set of Bluebird railcars on 9 May 1987. The railway was officially closed on 10 May 1987, and the line through Farina was removed in 1993.

== Present Day ==
Today, the Farina Restoration Group continues to conserve the ruins of the town and the railway. Markers have been placed within the town to show where the track once was, including where the SG and NG line once crossed. A SAR narrow gauge open wagon has been placed on a length of track adjacent to the former narrow gauge goods platform, and the sheep and cattle loading ramps on the standard gauge triangle have been rebuilt with SAR sheep and cattle wagons placed next to them. The water tank and a few railway buildings also remain at the site. The Farina Restoration Group eventually plans to rebuild the narrow gauge station building, which was a standard SAR design made out of wood. Planning is also underway to move locomotive NSU63, currently at the Steamtown Heritage Rail Centre in Peterborough, to Farina in the near future.
