= Marree railway line =

Mothballed heavy-haul railway in South Australia

Overview
- Termini: Stirling North; Marree
- Continues from: Trans-Australian Railway
- Continues as: Central Australia Railway

Service
- Operator(s): Commonwealth Railways

History
- Opened: 27 July 1957
- Closed: 27 April 2016

Technical
- Track gauge: 1,435 mm (4 ft 8 1/2 in) standard gauge

The Marree railway line is located in the Australian state of South Australia.

== History ==
As a result of the opening up of the Leigh Creek Coalfield in the late 1940s and capacity restrictions on the existing narrow gauge Central Australia Railway via the Flinders Ranges, Marree and Quorn, a new standard gauge line was built, opening on 17 May 1956 from Stirling North on the outskirts of Port Augusta to Telford Cut and on 27 July 1957 to Marree. The line was extended to Marree because of the volume of cattle traffic coming off the Birdsville Track.

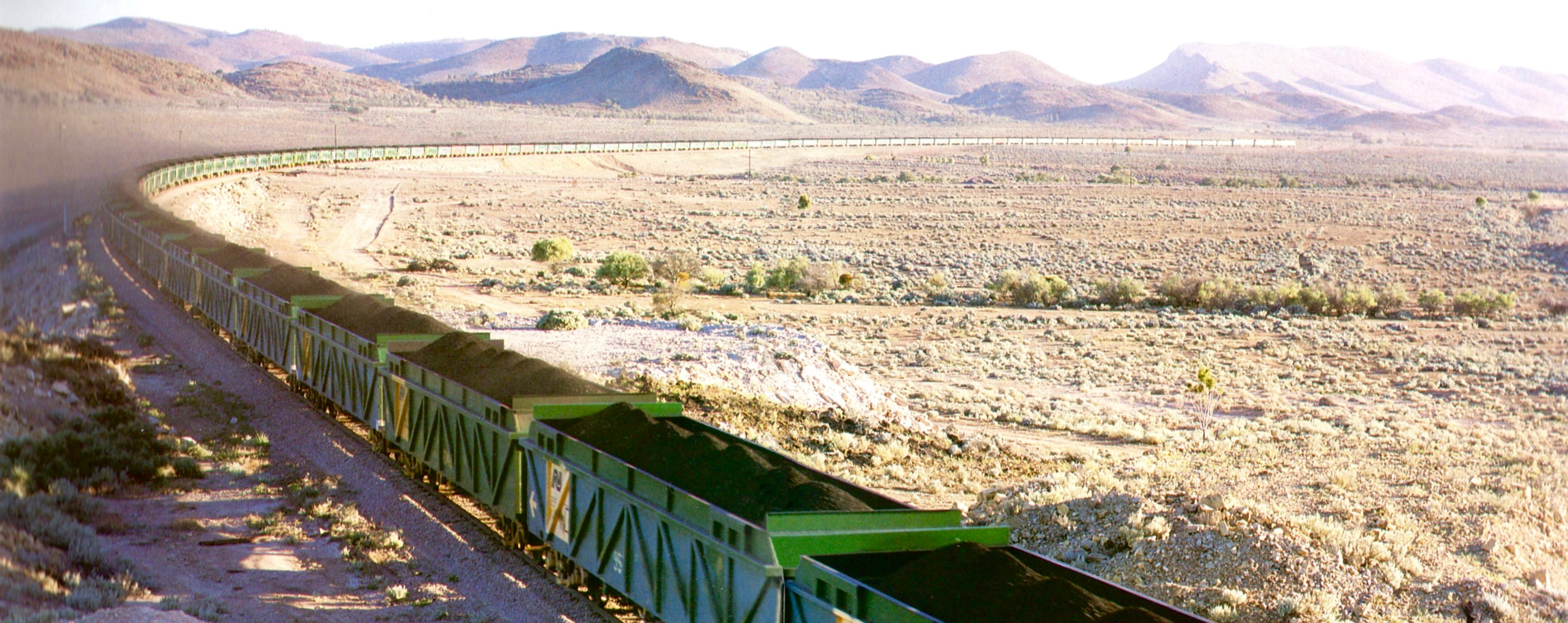
A 160-car coal train between Leigh Creek and Port Augusta in 1987

As well as freight trains, the new line was served by CB railcar services and The Ghan. The CB class was pulled from service in 1976 by Australian National Railways (ANR), leaving the standard gauge Ghan and a mixed train as the only passenger rail services on the line. Following the opening of a new line from Tarcoola to Alice Springs in 1980, the line became the only rail connection to Marree after the closure of the narrow gauge Central Australia Railway from Alice Springs, and The Ghan was rerouted to no longer go through Marree, leaving a mixed train as the only passenger service on the line. The mixed train was replaced with a goods only train in 1985, and the line was curtailed to its present terminus at Telford Cut on 10 June 1987. At Stirling North the line continues to the Northern Power Station via a balloon loop. With the impending closure of the power station, the last train ran on the line on 27 April 2016.

In 2017, control of the Leigh Creek railway line was transferred from Flinders Power to the state government's Department of Planning, Transport & Infrastructure. In March 2018, Bowmans Rail established a new intermodal rail terminal adjacent to the construction site for the Bungala Solar Power Farm about 12 km north of Port Augusta. As well as construction materials for the power station, the terminal was expected to handle about 2000 containers per year, though the terminal has not been used since completion of delivering materials to the solar power farm.

== Stations ==
Stations included the following: (from south to north):

- Northern Power Station
- Wikatana
- Neuroodla
- Brachina
- Parachilna
- Beltana
- Puttapa
- Copley
- Telford (Leigh Creek Coalfields)
- Lyndhurst
- Farina
- Marree
