= Coward Springs =

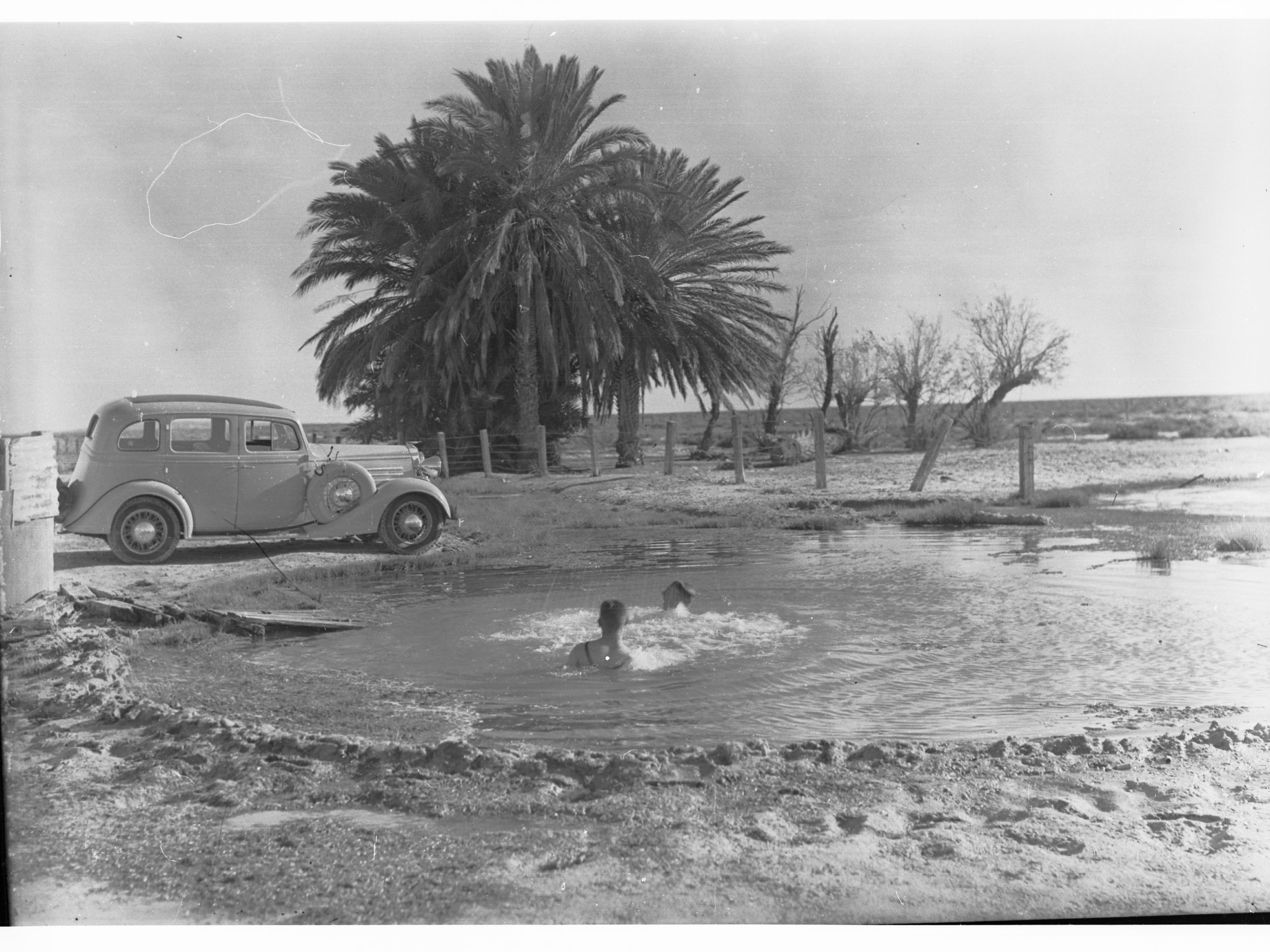
- Coward Springs, ca. 1935

- Coordinates: 29°24′04″S 136°48′42″E
- Country: Australia
- State: South Australia
- City: Stuarts Creek
- Location: 236 km (147 mi) east of Coober Pedy
- Established: 1858

Government
  - State electorate: Stuart
  - Federal division: Grey
- Elevation: 18 m (59 ft)
- Time zone: UTC+9:30 (ACST)
  - Summer (DST): UTC+10:30 (ACDT)

Coward Springs is a former railway station of the Central Australia Railway and associated settlement in the Far North region of South Australia, west of Lake Eyre South.

The name refers to a nearby mound spring, situated on the Oodnadatta Track adjacent to the Wabma Kadarbu Mound Springs Conservation Park. The site is within the locality of Stuarts Creek, 236 km (147 mi) from Coober Pedy and 216 km (134 mi) from Coober Pedy. A camping ground is at the site, where the attractions include two heritage-listed buildings, the original bore, date palms and tamarisk trees.

== Nomenclature and official status ==
The South Australian Commissioner of Police, Peter Warburton, named Coward Springs in 1858 after Corporal Thomas Coward. In 2019, Coward Springs's placename status was changed from "locality" to "mound spring".

== History ==
The South Australian government completed a 400-foot (120 m) borehole in 1886, from which water from the Great Artesian Basin rose 15 feet (4.6 m) above ground. The salty water corroded the bore head and casing, flowing uncontrolled to form a large pool and, by the 1920s, a wetland, in the dry gibber plain. It was reputed to be a popular place for local residents and – at a time when the railway's outback timetables had room for delays – train crews and passengers to cool off.

In 1993, the South Australian government redrilled and relined the bore, reducing the flow rate. The camping ground operators subsequently built a "natural spa" imitating the old pool, from which water was directed into the wetland.

The wetland created its own dynamics as an oasis providing water and food, shelter and breeding areas for a wide range of wildlife. As of 2008, the site was recorded as hosting 99 plant species, 126 bird species and numerous small native mammals, reptiles, aquatic and terrestrial invertebrates.

A school was opened in 1888, but it was closed in 1890. The Coward Springs Hotel, however, was licensed from 1887 to 1953. As trains pulled into the station, passengers were given directions to the "pub" and the "bath" for their choice of refreshment.

== Camping ground and heritage-listed place ==
As of 2020, Coward Springs was privately operated as a campground and heritage area. At the behest of the operators, the "Coward Springs railway site" was listed in the South Australian Heritage Register in 1998. The register cites the assets as:

a good example of an outback railway site in South Australia, being an important stopover for passengers travelling to Oodnadatta, as well as a stock and supply terminus. The date palms are a reminder of commercial ventures in the interior, and the tamarisk trees are examples of introduced species suitable for arid conditions. (Note: Tamarisk trees were declared a weed of national significance as a consequence of their spread, most dramatically and noticeably in central Australia, after floods of 1974 along the Finke River in the Northern Territory. Before then, the species had been present for many decades without much spread.)

There are two restored stone railway buildings (a stationmaster's house, in private use, and train crew quarters), (Note: The register refers to an "engine driver's cabin". However, such quarters, usually termed "barracks" by the South Australian Railways regardless of their size, were routinely used by three people – driver, fireman and guard – and occasionally a fitter or other employee, to rest at the end of their work shift.) two in-ground rainwater tanks, the original bore, date palms and tamarisk trees, also known as athel pines.

Although the date palms reputedly were planted by pioneering "Afghan" cameleers, they are in fact remnants of two acres of date palms (variety Deglet Noor) planted in 1898 as part of a South Australian government experimental plantation. Surviving date palms from this plantation still produce fruit.

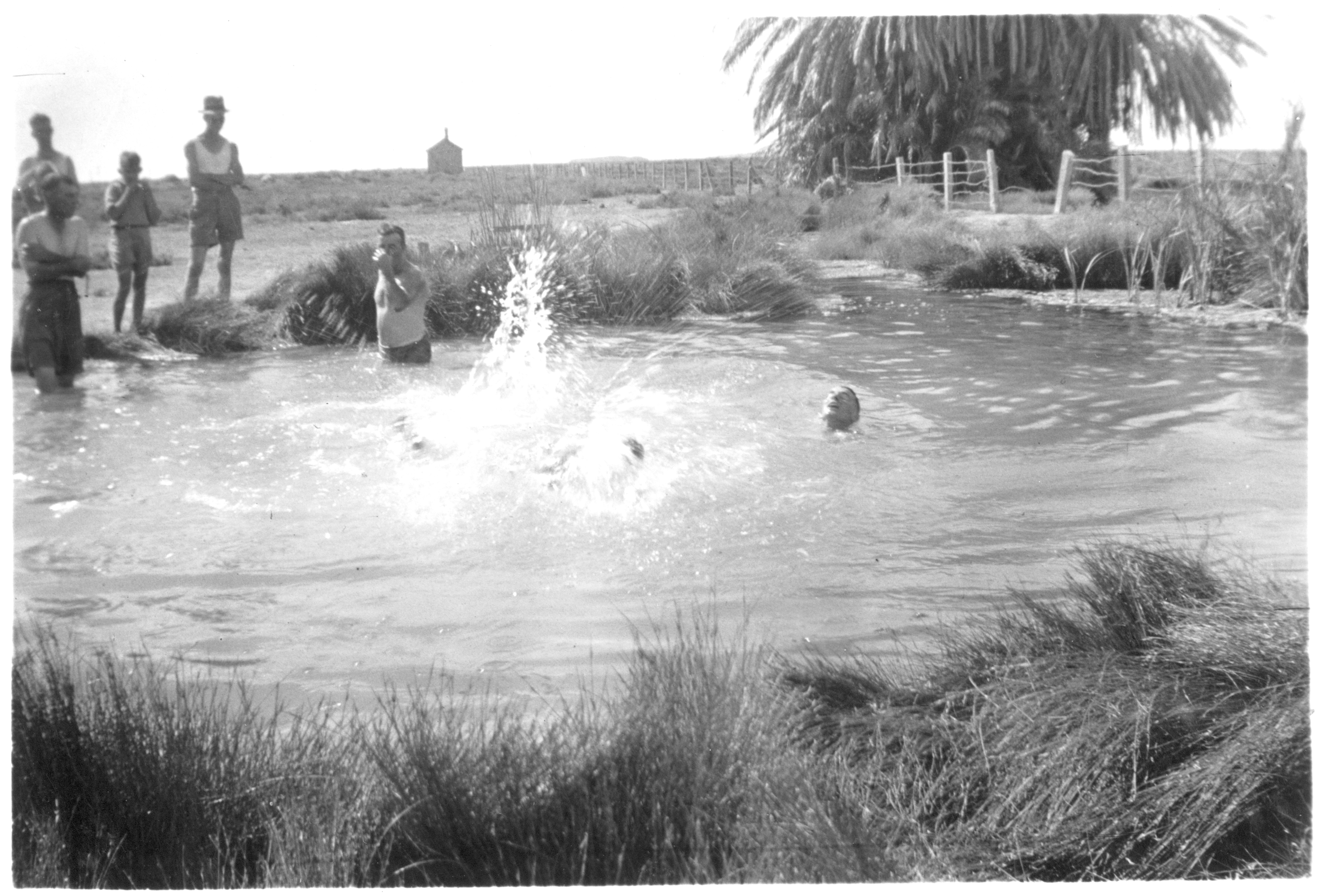
The waterhole at Coward Springs in 1940

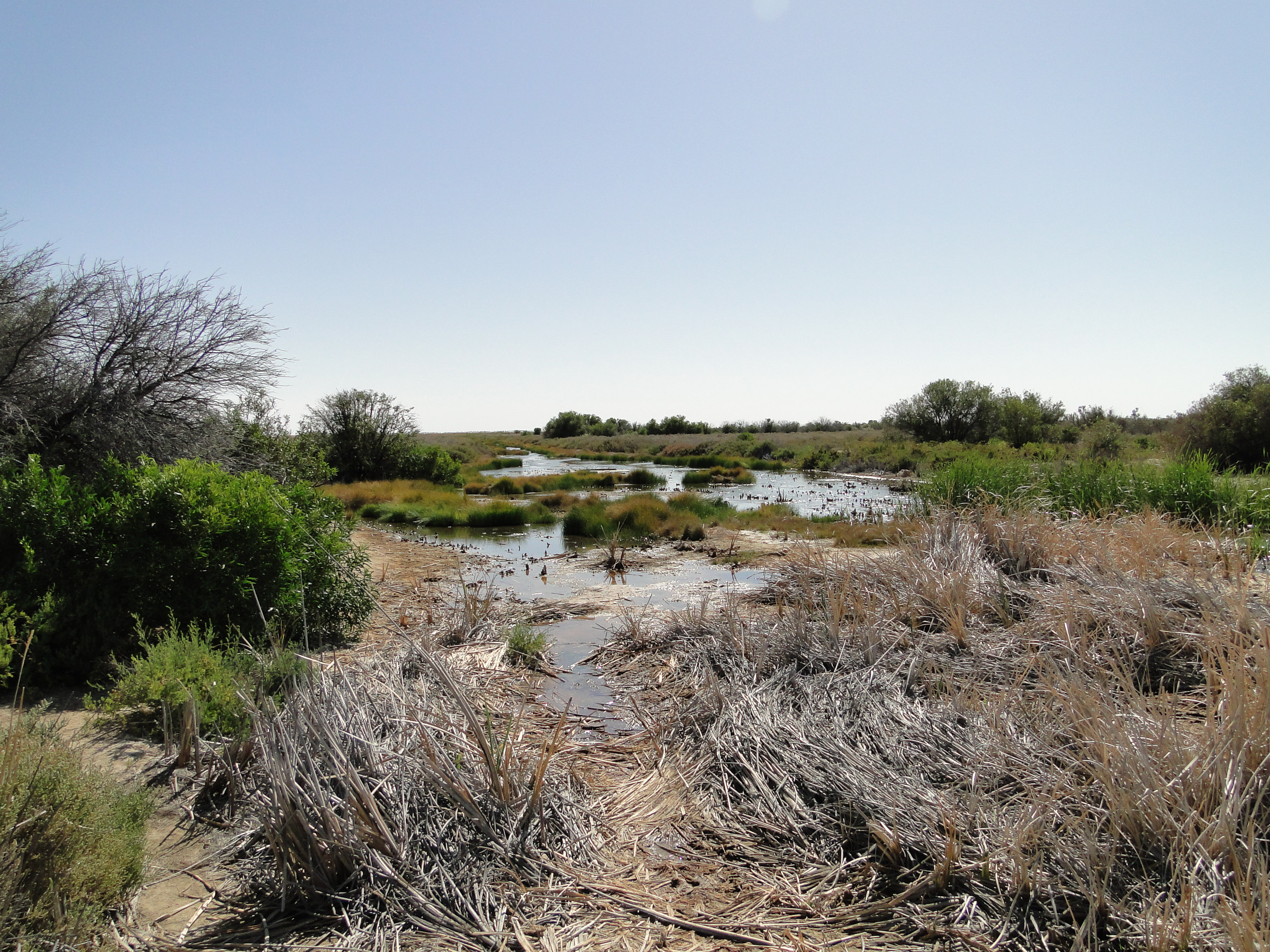
The wetlands

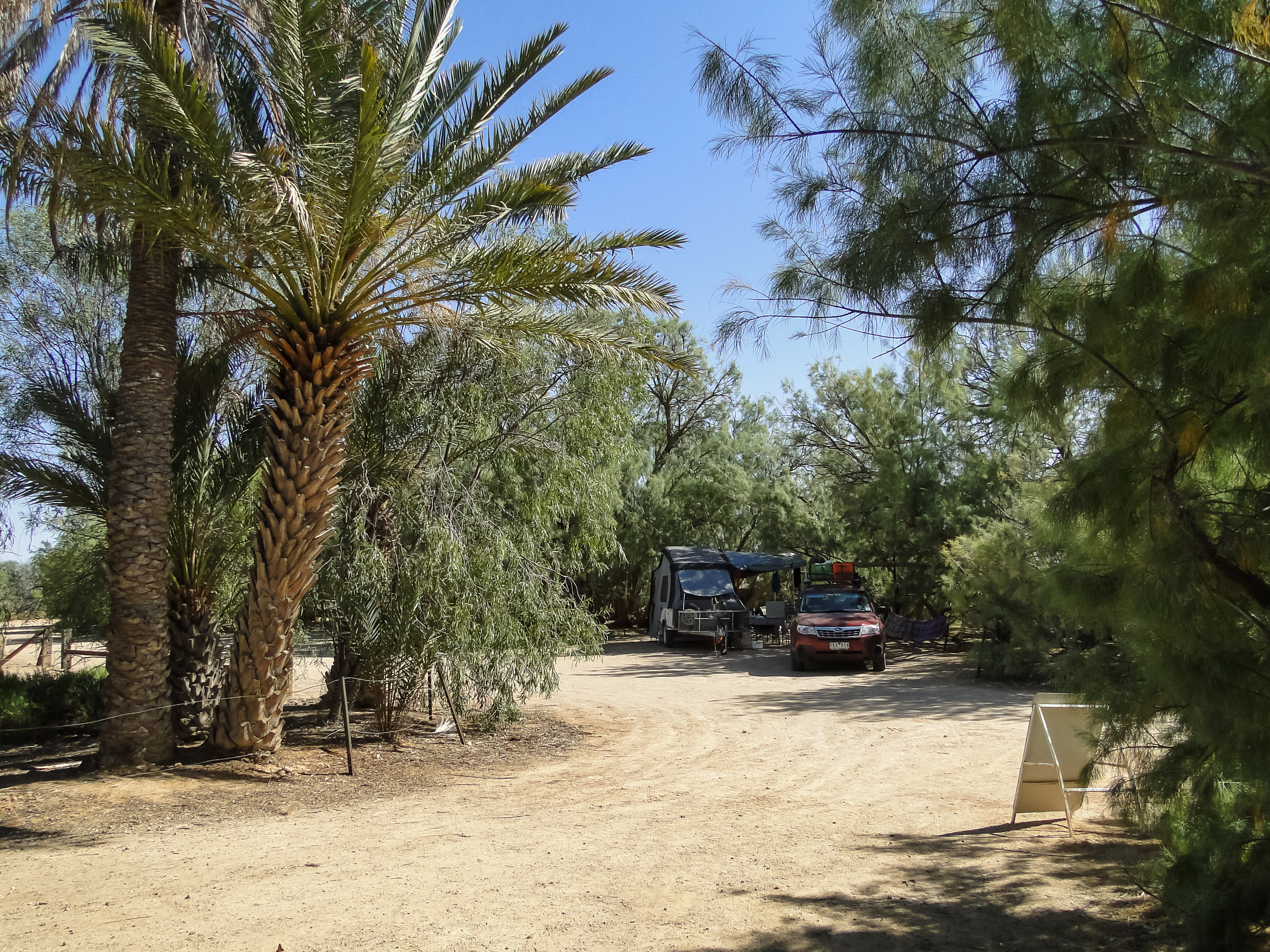
The camping area

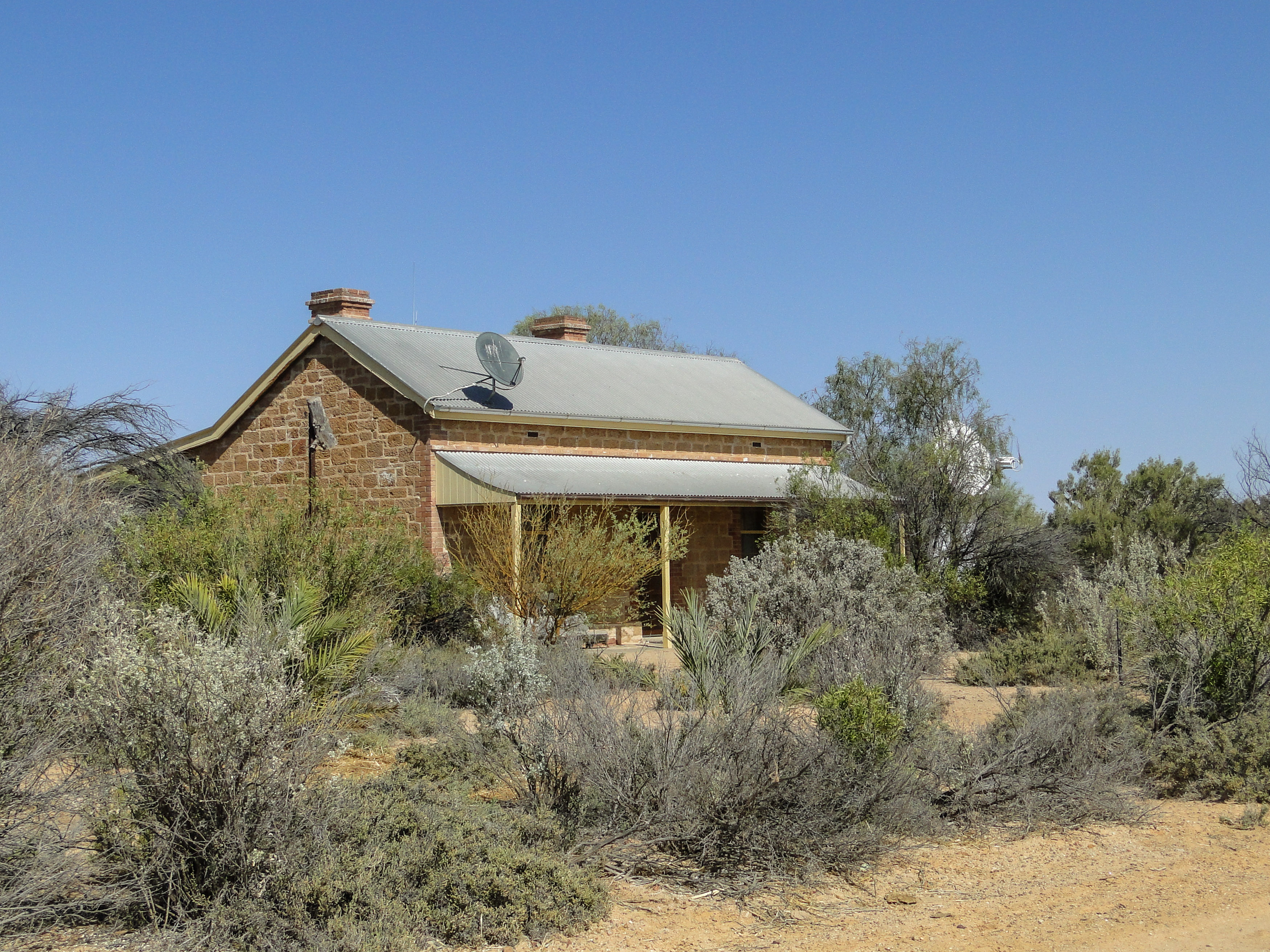
The restored former station master's house is also heritage-listed
