= Farina, South Australia =

Ghost town in South Australia

Farina
- Town
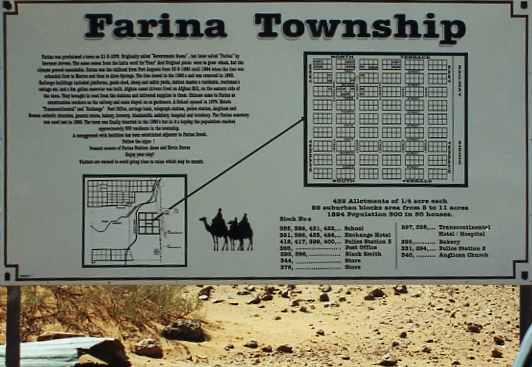

- Coordinates: 30°04′30″S 138°16′34″E
- Country: Australia
- State: South Australia
- Region: Far North
- LGA: Pastoral Unincorporated Area
- Location: 55 km (34 mi) S of Marree
- Established: 21 March 1878 (town); 29 May 1997 (locality)

Government
  - State electorate: Stuart
  - Federal division: Grey
- Elevation: 303 m (994 ft)

Population
  - Total: 15 (includes other localities in the "State Suburb of Farina") (2021 census) (Note: For the 2021 census, Farina's "Geography type: Suburbs and Localities" consisted of Farina and other localities within an area extending from the shore of Lake Torrens in the south to immediately north of Marree but not including Marree.)
- Time zone: UTC+9:30 (ACST)
  - Summer (DST): UTC+10:30 (ACDT)
- Postcode: 5733
- Mean max temp: 27.0 °C (80.6 °F)
- Mean min temp: 12.4 °C (54.3 °F)
- Annual rainfall: 164.2 mm (6.46 in)
Localities around Farina
Farina Station	Farina Station	Farina Station
Farina Station	Farina	Farina Station
Farina Station	Farina Station	Farina Station

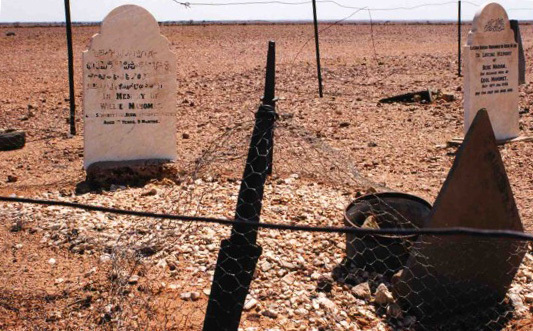
Islamic headstones facing Mecca in Farina's cemetery

Farina, formerly Farina Town and originally Government Gums, is an abandoned town in the Australian state of South Australia. The name also applies to an area of about 8500 square kilometres (3300 square miles) in which the town is located. At the 2006 census, 55 people lived in the larger area; by the 2021 census, the population had fallen to 15.

Farina sits within the arid Lake Eyre basin, 26 kilometres (16 mi) north of Lyndhurst and 55 kilometres (34 mi) south of Marree where the Oodnadatta Track and the Birdsville Track commence. It is 540 kilometres (340 miles) due north of the state capital, Adelaide in the days when the rail connection was narrow gauge to Port Augusta, the distance by rail was 657 kilometres (408 miles).

== History ==
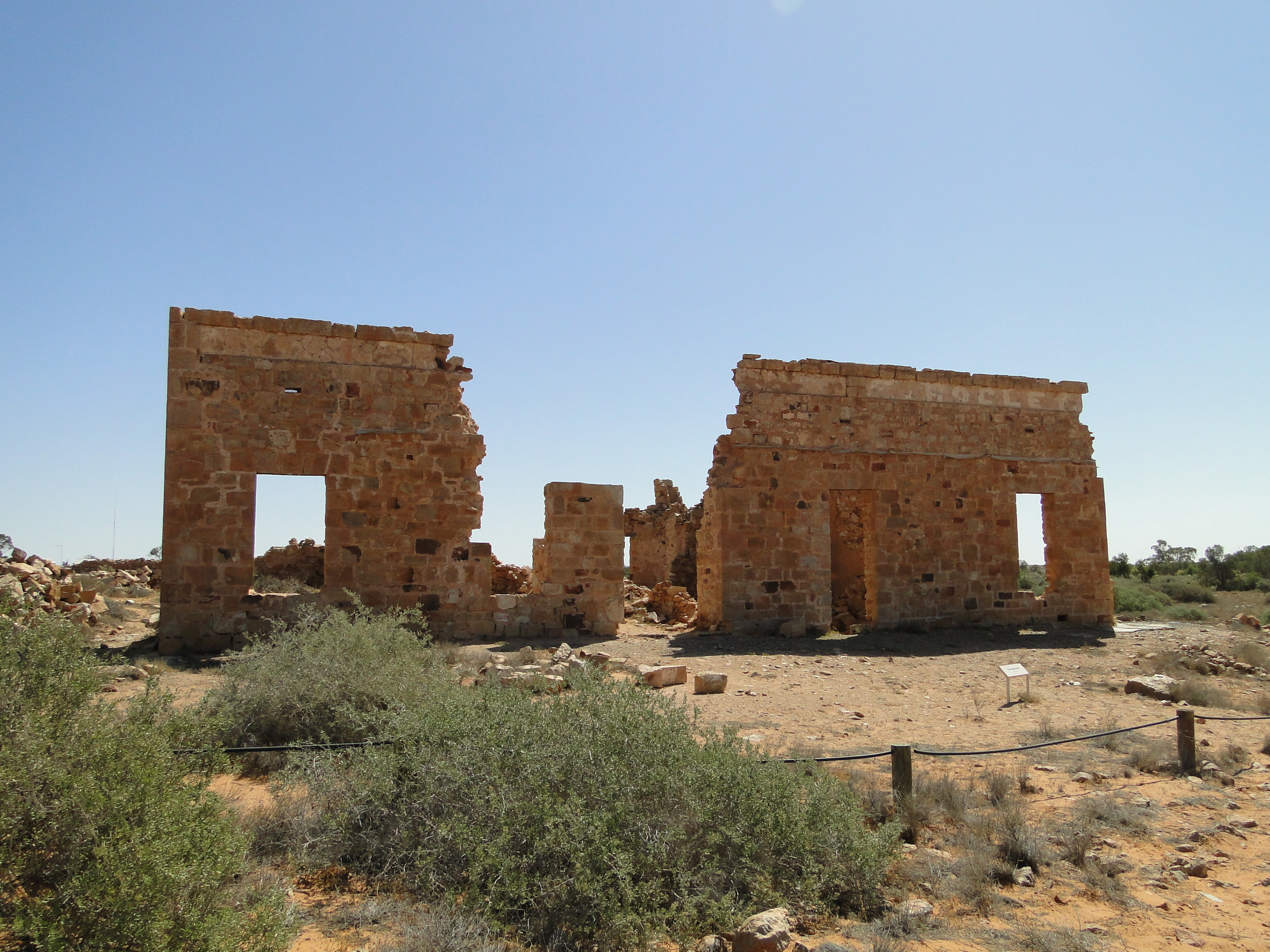
Ruins of the Exchange Hotel, Farina

In 1876, after a police trooper had been posted to the Government Gums, a "long neglected district", a deputation asked for a portion of the district to be allotted as a township so that a post office might be erected; that a telegraph station be opened; and that a weekly mail service from Beltana to the north-west be set up. The townsite, on a reserve surrounding Gums Waterhole, was surveyed and on 21 March 1878, Farina Town was proclaimed.

Originally called The Gums or Government Gums, Farina was settled in 1878 by optimistic farmers hoping that rain follows the plough. The town became a railhead in 1882, but the railway was extended to Marree in 1884. During the wet years of the 1880s, plans were laid out for a town with 432 quarter-acre (0.10 hectares) blocks. It was believed that the area would be good for growing wheat and barley, but normal rainfall proved to be nowhere near enough for that. Several silver and copper mines were opened in the surrounding area.

Farina grew to reach a peak population of about 600 in the late 19th century. In its heyday, the town had two hotels (the Transcontinental and the Exchange), an underground bakery, a bank, two breweries, a general store, an Anglican church, five blacksmiths, a school (1879–1957) and a brothel. In 1909, a 1,143-kilogram (2,520 lb) iron meteorite was discovered north-east of the town.

Today, little remains of the township, except for stone ruins, a seasonally operating underground bakery, and the elevated water tank of the former railway. The post office closed in the 1960s. The 1067 mm (3 ft 6 in) narrow-gauge Central Australia Railway closed in 1958.

The name Farina was adopted on 5 April 1979.

The town has not been inhabited since 1967, with the closest residents living at Farina station, visible to the west of the town. A bush camping area is maintained by the owners of Farina station.

In 2008, Farina Restoration Group was formed, and in May of that year, 30 people attended a 14-day restoration program at Farina. These efforts have included the repair of the bakery and the addition of informational signs.

Each winter the town also hosts a Farina vs the Rest of the World cricket match at the Farina Cricket Ground, a tradition dating back to 1983.

=== Cemeteries ===
The town's cemetery is a few kilometres away via a signposted track. Of interest is the Afghan corner of the cemetery, which contains several headstones with both English and Arabic inscriptions, plus several headstones without inscriptions, marking the resting place of former Farina residents of Afghan origin, who were involved in or connected with the camel trains which used to provide transport services before the railway was extended. In the Islamic tradition, all the gravestones face Mecca

=== First World War enlistments ===
During the First World War, 33 men who were born in Farina enlisted for the duration of the war and for four months after its end. All of them were volunteers. Of the total, five were killed in action, ten were wounded, and one died at sea en route to England. One of the youngest Farina residents to enlist was 15-year-old William James Denham Robinson, who used an alias of Charles Robison; he served in both world wars.

=== World War II ===
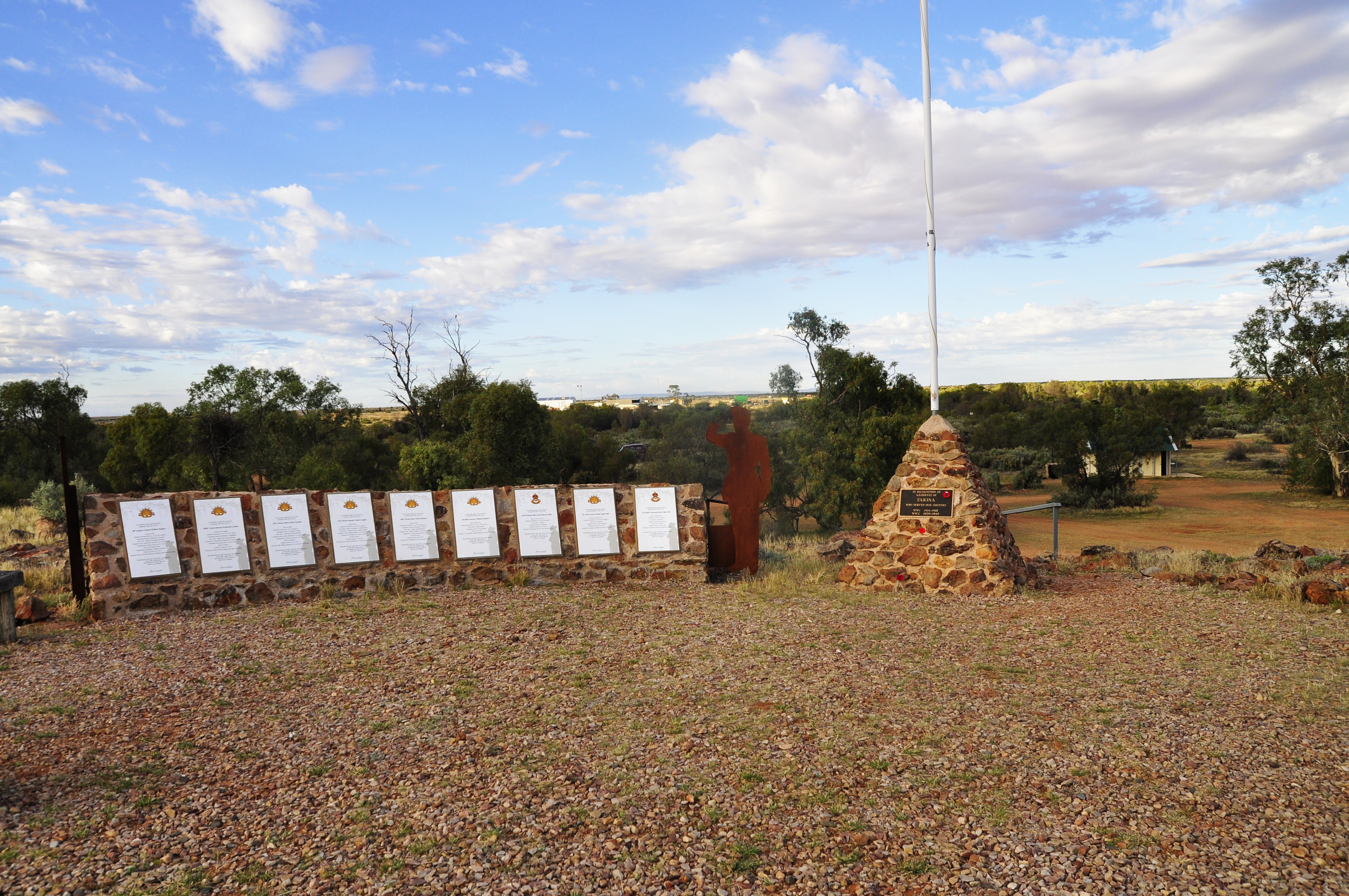
Farina war memorial

During World War II, 35 men born in Farina enlisted. Of those, nine served in the Royal Australian Air Force. The first man enlisted on 18 October 1939 and the last man on 15 March 1945. The youngest was 18 when he enlisted and the oldest was 45. Three men were killed in action and a fourth died during his service in the army. The last Farina man was discharged in October 1948.

== Climate ==
Farina has a hot desert climate, although a temperature station has not been in operation there since 1939.

Climate data for Farina 1889–1939 normals, rainfall 1879-2018
Month	Jan	Feb	Mar	Apr	May	Jun	Jul	Aug	Sep	Oct	Nov	Dec	Year
Record high °C (°F)	46.7 (116.1)	45.6 (114.1)	43.3 (109.9)	38.9 (102.0)	33.1 (91.6)	30.0 (86.0)	30.0 (86.0)	31.7 (89.1)	37.8 (100.0)	43.1 (109.6)	44.2 (111.6)	46.4 (115.5)	46.7 (116.1)
Mean daily maximum °C (°F)	35.5 (95.9)	35.4 (95.7)	32.0 (89.6)	26.5 (79.7)	21.6 (70.9)	17.7 (63.9)	17.3 (63.1)	19.8 (67.6)	23.7 (74.7)	27.9 (82.2)	31.9 (89.4)	34.5 (94.1)	27.0 (80.6)
Mean daily minimum °C (°F)	19.9 (67.8)	20.0 (68.0)	17.0 (62.6)	12.1 (53.8)	8.1 (46.6)	5.5 (41.9)	4.1 (39.4)	5.7 (42.3)	8.5 (47.3)	12.5 (54.5)	16.1 (61.0)	18.7 (65.7)	12.4 (54.3)
Record low °C (°F)	10.6 (51.1)	10.6 (51.1)	7.8 (46.0)	2.7 (36.9)	−1.4 (29.5)	−2.8 (27.0)	−3.8 (25.2)	−2.2 (28.0)	0.6 (33.1)	2.8 (37.0)	5.6 (42.1)	7.8 (46.0)	−3.8 (25.2)
Average precipitation mm (inches)	18.8 (0.74)	19.7 (0.78)	15.2 (0.60)	10.7 (0.42)	14.7 (0.58)	16.0 (0.63)	9.3 (0.37)	10.7 (0.42)	10.6 (0.42)	12.9 (0.51)	12.3 (0.48)	15.1 (0.59)	165.0 (6.50)

== See also ==
- Farina (disambiguation)
