= Lake Ngapakaldi to Lake Palankarinna Fossil Area =

Paleontological site in South Australia

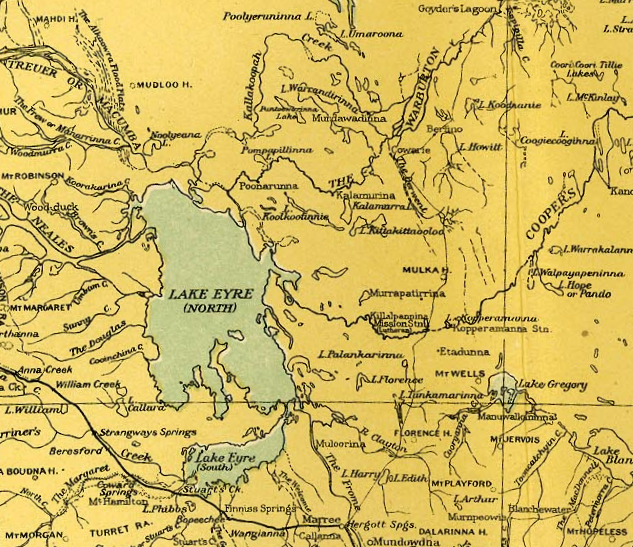
The lakes of the reserve lie to the right of Lake Eyre below the centre of the map

The Lake Ngapakaldi to Lake Palankarinna Fossil Area is a group of fossil sites in the Australian state of South Australia within the Tirari Desert in the north-eastern part of the state's Far North region. The group has an overall area of 35 square kilometres (14 sq mi) and is located about 70 kilometres (43 mi) east of Lake Eyre and about 100 kilometres (62 mi) north-north-east of Marree, off the Birdsville Track near Etadunna Station.

== Description ==
The area consists of four lakes grouped into two areas located about 40 kilometres (25 mi) apart. They are surrounded by extensive areas of sand dunes in a flat, arid landscape. The lake beds are largely unvegetated and usually dry. Low cliffs on the western margins of the lakes have produced a variety of Tertiary vertebrate fossils ranging in age from the late Oligocene to the Pleistocene.

=== Lakes Kununka, Ngapakaldi and Pitikanta ===
The following three lakes are located on the west side of the gazetted locality of Mulka with Lake Ngapakaldi being partly located within the locality of Lake Eyre:

- Lake Kununka 28°23′S 138°18′E
- Lake Pitikanta 28°21′S 138°18′E
- Lake Ngapakaldi 28°17′S 138°17′E

=== Lake Palankarinna ===
Lake Palankarinna 28°46′S 138°24′E is located in the gazetted locality of Etadunna on the west side of the Birdsville Track to the south of the other three sites. The lake is part of a reserve known as the "Lake Palankarinna Fossil Reserve", which consists of part of the western half of the lake bed and a parcel of land to the west.

== Status ==
The four sites are subject to a number of past and present heritage listings while one is located with a protected area:

- All four sites were listed as one entity on the now-defunct Register of the National Estate (No.5905) on 21 October 1980.
- Lakes Kanunka, Pitikanta and Ngapakaldi has been listed as state heritage places on the South Australian Heritage Register since 1997.
- Lake Ngapakaldi is also partly located within the Kati Thanda-Lake Eyre National Park.
- Lake Palankarinna and some adjoining land has been gazetted since 1954 as a "fossil reserve" under what is currently known as the Pastoral Land Management and Conservation Act 1989 in order to "prevent the exploitation for profit of these areas by non-scientists". The fossil reserve has also been listed as a "state heritage place" since 1993.

== See also ==
- List of fossil parks
