= Clayton Station, South Australia =

Clayton Station
- Town
- Coordinates: 29.31°S 138.44°E
- Country: Australia
- State: South Australia
- LGA: Unincorporated area
- Location: 60 km (37 mi) northeast of Marree; 445 km (277 mi) north of Port Augusta; 470 km (290 mi) south of Birdsville, Queensland

Government
  - State electorate: Stuart
  - Federal division: Grey
- Postcode: 5733
Localities around Clayton Station
Lake Eyre	Etadunna	Dulkaninna
	Clayton Station	Murnpeowie
Muloorina		Mundowdna

Clayton Station is a 1,000-square-mile (2,600 km^{2}) pastoral lease operating as a cattle station in far north South Australia.

== Geography ==
Clayton Station is located at the south end of the Birdsville Track. Clayton also provides a public camping ground.
