= Etadunna, South Australia =

Etadunna
- Suburb
- Coordinates: 28°45′38″S 138°30′32″E
- Country: Australia
- State: South Australia
- Region: Far North
- LGA: Pastoral Unincorporated Area
- Location: 684 km (425 mi) N of Adelaide; 108 km (67 mi) NE of Marree
- Established: 2013

Government
  - State electorate: Stuart
  - Federal division: Grey

Population
  - Total: 63 (shared) (2016 census) (Note: For the 2016 census, the locality of Etadunna was included in the Australian Bureau of Statistics division known as the 'State Suburb of Mungeranie' which also included the following localities (or parts of) and which all shared a population of 63 people - Clayton Station, the south-east part of Cowarie, Dulkaninna, the part of Lake Eyre located east of the lake of the same name, Muloorina, the west part of Mulka and the west part of Mungeranie.)
- Time zone: UTC+9:30 (ACST)
  - Summer (DST): UTC+10:30 (ACST)
- Postcode: 5733
- Mean max temp: 28.8 °C (83.8 °F)
- Mean min temp: 13.3 °C (55.9 °F)
- Annual rainfall: 161.8 mm (6.37 in)
Suburbs around Etadunna
| Lake Eyre | Lake Eyre; Mulka | Mulka |
| Lake Eyre | Etadunna | Strzelecki Desert |
| Lake Eyre | Clayton Station; Dulkaninna; Murnpeowie | Murnpeowie |
- Location; Adjoining localities

Etadunna is a locality in the Australian state of South Australia located about 684 kilometres (425 miles) north of the capital city of Adelaide and about 108 kilometres (67 miles) north-east of the town of Marree.

== Location and description ==
It is located within the federal Division of Grey, the state electoral district of Stuart, the Pastoral Unincorporated Area of South Australia and the state’s Far North region.

Etadunna consists of a landscape that is described as an “extensive dunefield interrupted by large claypans grading into a large playa complex of salt lakes with gypsum dunes, and surrounding plain with channels and dunes”.

The Birdsville Track passes through the locality from south to north, while the watercourse of Cooper Creek passes from east to west across its northern end. Features associated with the Cooper Creek watercourse include the northern end of Lake Gregory, which is located in the locality’s south-eastern corner.

The principal land uses within the locality are primary production and conservation, with the former being associated with the grazing of cattle and the latter concerning the Coongie Lakes wetland system on the locality’s east side.

Etadunna was located within an area shared with a number of adjoining localities which was surveyed during the 2016 Australian census in August 2016 and was found to have a population of 63 people.

== History ==
The locality name was gazetted on 26 April 2013 in respect to “the long established local name” which is derived from the pastoral lease called Etadunna Station.

== Places of cultural and natural heritage significance ==
Places of cultural and natural heritage significance either wholly or partly located within the locality include:

- the Coongie Lakes wetland system which part is located in the locality's north-east and which is listed as both a Ramsar and a DIWA wetland;
- the Killalpaninna Mission site and the Lake Palankarinna Fossil Reserve which are listed on the South Australian Heritage Register and;
- the "shipwreck" of the barge MV Tom Brennan which is listed as a historic shipwreck in South Australia.
