= Tirari Desert =

Desert in South Australia

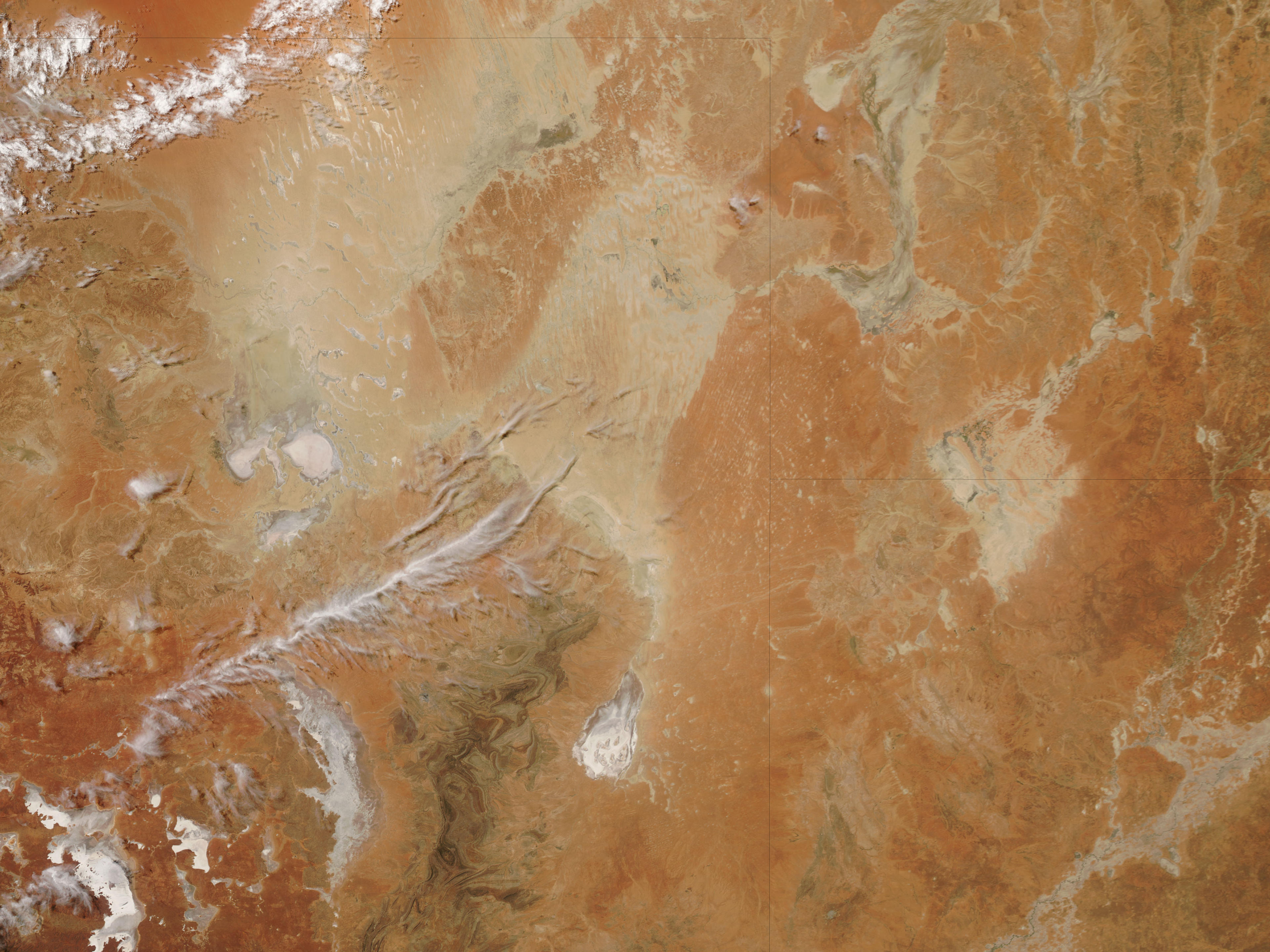
- NASA satellite image, 2006

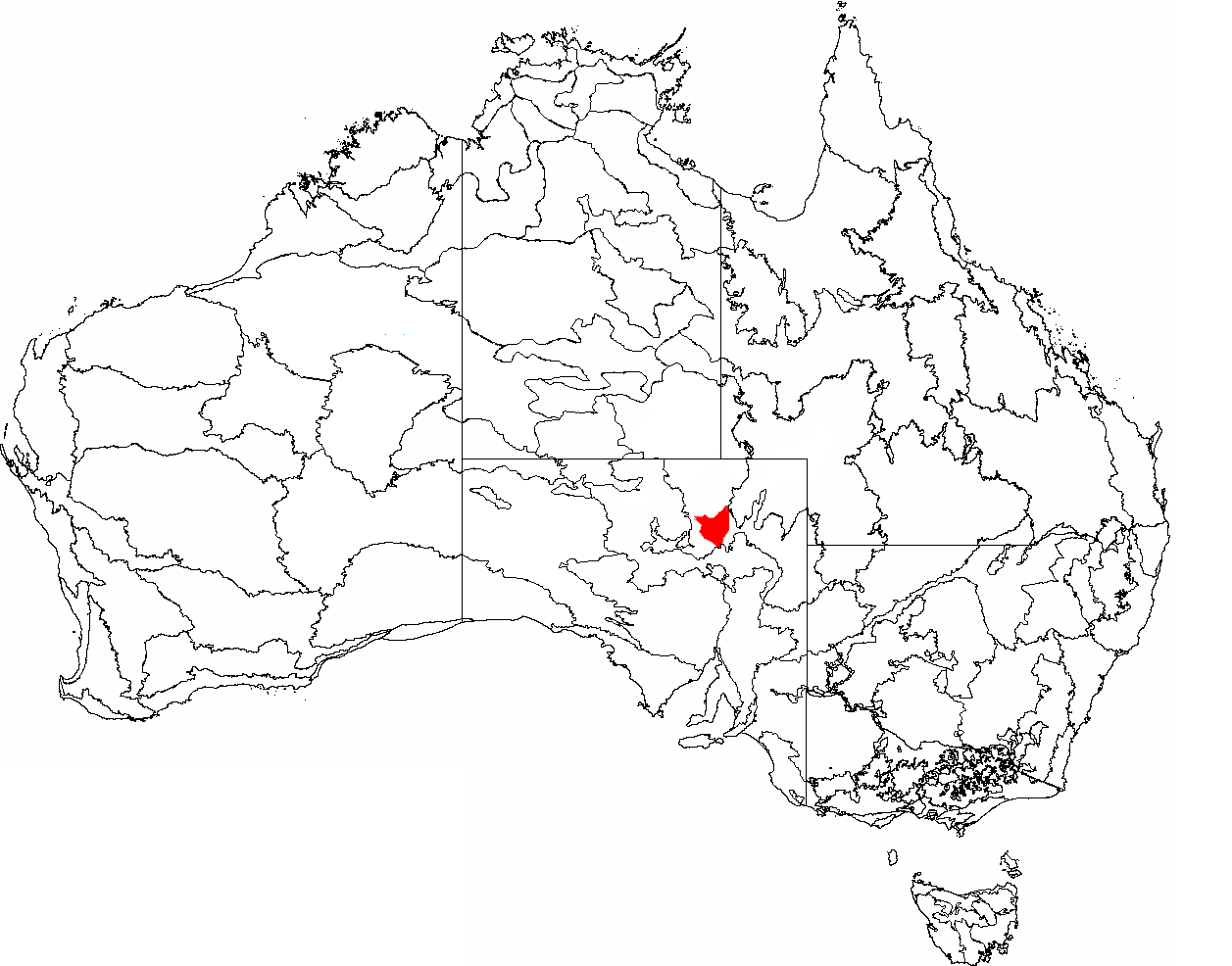
- This is a map of the Interim Biogeographic Regionalisation of Australia (IBRA), with state boundaries overlaid. The Tirari Desert region is shown in red.
- Area: 15,250 km^{2} (5,890 mi^{2})

Geography
- Country: Australia
- State: South Australia
- Region: Far North
- Coordinates: 28.37°S 138.12°E

The Tirari Desert is a 15,250 square kilometres (5,888 sq mi) desert in the eastern part of the Far North region of South Australia. It stretches 212 km from north to south and 153 km from east to west.

== Location and description ==
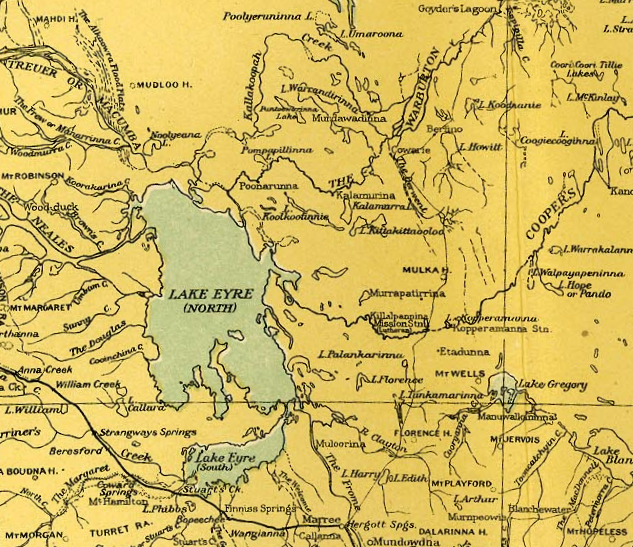
1916 map of Tirari Desert and environs. (Note:the desert is not labelled or delineated)

The Tirari Desert features salt lakes and large north–south running sand dunes. It is located partly within the Kati Thanda-Lake Eyre National Park. It lies mainly to the east of Lake Eyre North. Cooper Creek runs through the centre of the desert.

The adjacent deserts of the area include Simpson Desert which lies to the north while the Strzelecki Desert is to the east and the Sturt Stony Desert runs aligned with the Birdsville track to the north east.

The desert experiences harsh conditions with high temperatures and very low rainfall (mean annual rainfall is below 125 millimetres (4.9 in)).

=== Access and stations ===
The main vehicular access to the desert is via the unpaved Birdsville Track which runs northwards from Marree to Birdsville. The Mungerannie Hotel is the only location between the two towns that provides services.

The Tirari Desert region has a number of large cattle stations which are stopping points on the Channel Country aviation mail run.

Dulkaninna Station has been run by the same family for 110 years, has 2,000 cattle and breeds horses and kelpies. Etadunna Station to the north is a 1-million-acre (4,000 km^{2}) cattle station with 2500 cattle. The station environs include a number of heritage sites include Bucaltaninna Homestead ruins, the Woolshed ruins and Canny Trig Point (also known as Milner's Pile) and the state heritage-registered Killalpaninna Mission site.

Further north again is Mulka Station which also has a number of heritage sites including homestead ruins at Apatoongannie, Old Mulka and Ooroowillannie. The Mulka Store ruins is listed as a state heritage place on the South Australian Heritage Register.

== Vegetation ==
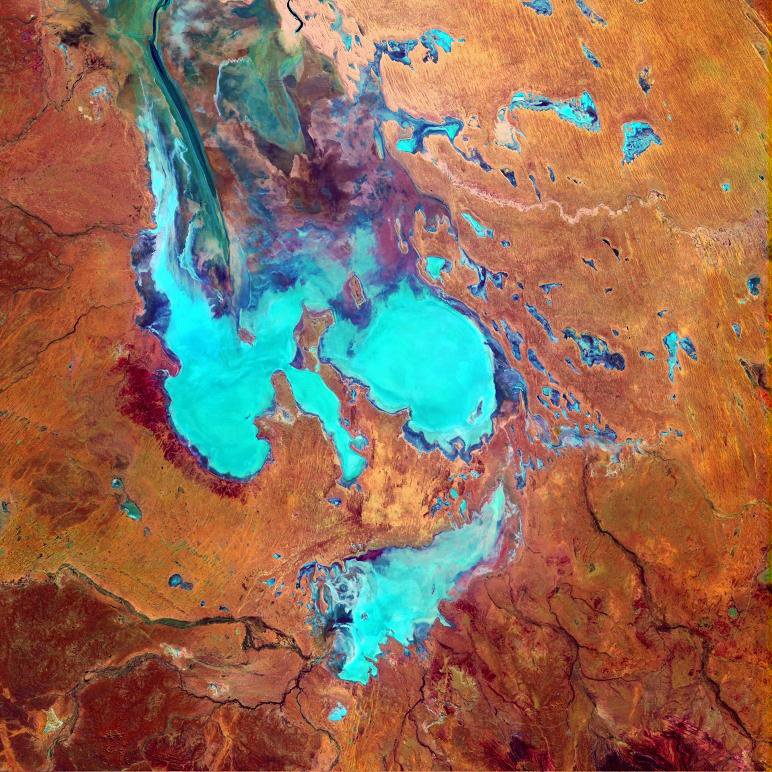
South-west parts of the Tirari Desert, 29 July 1999

The vegetation of the dunefields of the Tirari Desert is dominated by either Sandhill Wattle (Acacia ligulata) or Sandhill Cane-grass (Zygochloa paradoxa) which occur on the crests and slopes of dunes. Tall, open shrubland also occurs on the slopes. The otherwise sparsely vegetated dunefields become covered by a carpet of grasses, herbs and colourful flowering plants following rains.

The interdune soil types and hence the vegetation, varies with the dune spacing. Closer spaced dunes result in sandy valleys that have similar vegetation to the dune sides while widely spaced dunes are separated by gibber or flood plains, each supporting particular vegetation communities.

The vegetation on the floodplains varies with the capacity of the land to retain floodwaters, and the frequency of inundation. In drier areas, species including Old Man Saltbush (Atriplex nummularia), Cottonbush (Maireana aphylla) and Queensland Bluebush (Chenopodium auricomum) form a sparse, open shrubland, whereas swamps and depressions are frequently associated with Swamp Cane-grass (Eragrostis australasica) and Lignum (Muehlenbeckia florulenta).

The intermittent watercourses and permanent waterholes associated with tributaries of Cooper Creek support woodland dominated by river red gum (Eucalyptus camaldulensis) and coolibah (Eucalyptus coolabah).

As at 2008, the Tirari Desert is included in biogeographic regions (IBRA) SSD3: Dieri, part of the Simpson Strzelecki Dunefields (SSD) Region. The desert is also part of the Tirari-Sturt stony desert ecoregion.

== Fossils ==
The desert includes the Lake Ngapakaldi to Lake Palankarinna Fossil Area, a 3.5 square kilometres (1.4 sq mi) area on the now-defunct Register of the National Estate with significant Tertiary period vertebrate fossils.

== History ==
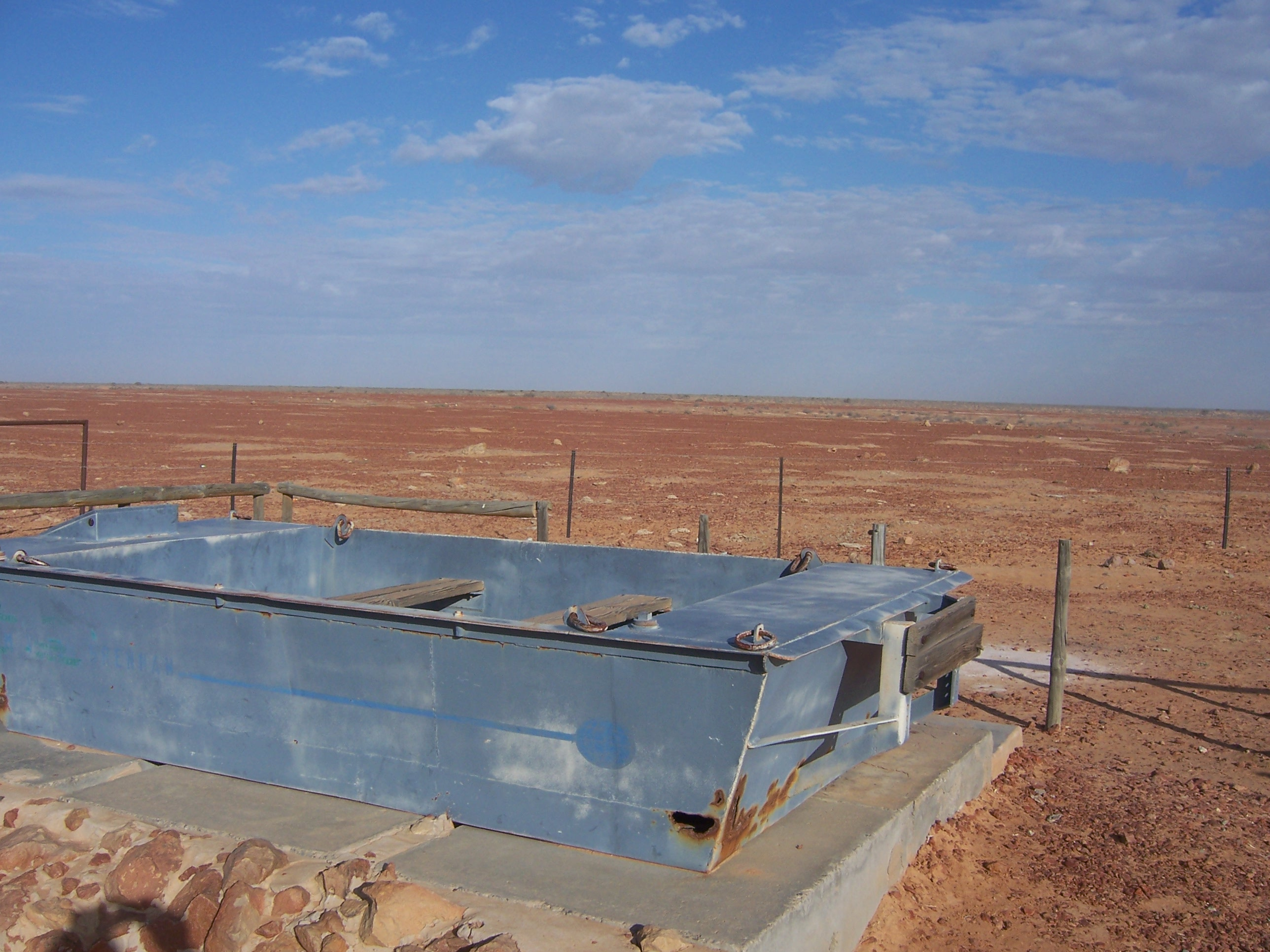
Tirarai Desert from Southern edge bank of Cooper Creek on Birdsville Track showing old punt for crossing during flood

The area was first explored by Europeans in 1866 and was previously settled by a small tribe of Aboriginals, the Tirari.

=== Dieri people ===
The Tirari Desert has been part of the Dieri people's native title claim. The Australian anthropologist Norman Tindale reported a small tribe now extinct which he referred to as the Tirari. They were located at the eastern shore of Lake Eyre from Muloorina north to Warburton River; east to Killalapaninna. Tindale disagreed with the earlier findings of Alfred William Howitt that these people were a horde of the Dieri as the language spoken was different from Dieri. Since Tindale's work was published, much of the data relating to Aboriginal language group distribution and definition has undergone revision since 1974. Tindale's focus was to depict Aboriginal tribal distribution at the time of European contact.

=== Missions ===
In the 1860s two Aboriginal missions were established near the Cooper Creek crossing of the Birdsville Track. The Moravians established a short-lived mission at Lake Kopperamanna in 1866. This was closed in 1869 due to drought conditions and poor relations with the local indigenous community.

Bethesda Mission was established by German Lutherans at nearby Lake Killalpaninna around the same period and, after also being abandoned for a short time, was re-established and by the 1880s it resembled a small town with more than 20 dwellings including a church. At this time, it had a population of "several hundred aborigines and a dozen whites". Primarily financed by sheep grazing, the mission closed in 1917 due to the effects of drought and rabbit plagues. Currently, there is little evidence of the settlement other than a small cemetery and some remnant timber posts. The mission remains are listed on the South Australian Heritage Register as the Killalpaninna Mission Site.

=== European exploration ===
On an 1866 expedition to determine the northern limit of Lake Eyre, Peter Egerton Warburton approached the desert from the west and followed the upstream course of what is now known as the Warburton River, but which he incorrectly believed was Cooper Creek. In 1874 another expedition, led by James William Lewis, again followed the river upstream to the Queensland border, retracing the route on the return journey and then headed south to the Kopperamanna mission. Subsequently, they followed the course of Cooper Creek to conduct a survey of the east shore of Lake Eyre. Lewis, in a later account of his expedition, said of the lake "I sincerely trust I may never see it again; it is useless in every respect, and the very sight of it creates thirst in man and beast."

== See also ==
- Deserts of Australia
- Lake Eyre Basin
- List of deserts by area
