= Etadunna =

Etadunna may refer to:

- Etadunna, South Australia, the gazetted locality named for the station
- Etadunna Airstrip, an airfield in South Australia
- Etadunna Formation, a geological formation found in Queensland - refer Baru
- Etadunna Station, a pastoral lease in northeastern South Australia
