= Dulkaninna =

Pastoral lease in South Australia

Coordinates: 29.0186°S 138.461945°E

Location in South Australia

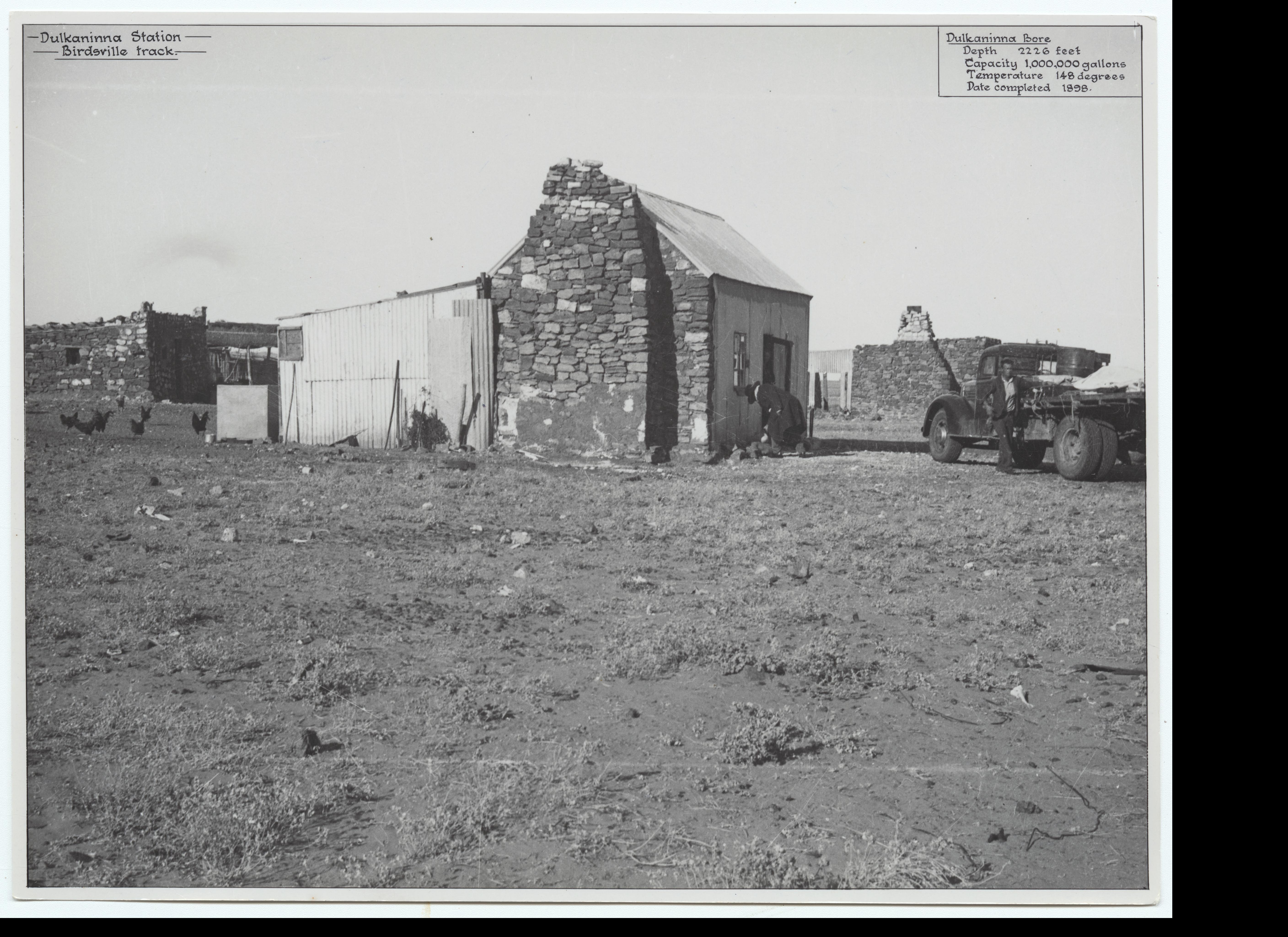
Dulkaninna Station, ca 1930

Dulkaninna Station is a pastoral lease that once operated as a sheep station but now operates as a cattle station in outback South Australia.

It is along the Birdsville Track approximately 84 kilometres (52 mi) north of Marree at the southern end of the Tirari Desert. The property is composed of a variety of land systems including gibber plains, black soil flood plains, sand-hill country, table land country and creek systems. Lake Gregory is in the north-east corner of the property. It shares a boundary with Clayton Station to the south-west, Murnpeowie to the south-east and Etadunna Station to the north.

The property occupies an area of 2,000 square kilometres (772 sq mi) and runs beef cattle; it is a certified organic producer. The Bell family own the property and have down so for over 110 years. The property runs a herd of Poll Hereford crossed with Black Angus and also breeds stock and quarter horses.

Geological surveys were conducted in the area in 1885 with bores also being sunk in the area at the same time.

Once part of the Mundowdna run that was owned by Sidney Kidman, a 255 square miles (660 km^{2}) block called Dulkaninna North East, was resumed by the Department of Lands in 1896, and the lease was acquired by George William Barrett. In 1914 the property was owned by Messrs Sinclair, Scott and Company with both sheep and cattle being run at the station.

The property was abandoned in 1920. By 1923 the property was owned by the Avon Downs Pastoral Company. The Bell family acquired the property in 1933. In 1935 the property was suffering a dry spell with D. D. Bell, the owner, intending to start breeding horses at Dulkaninna again. Bell had a pedal wireless installed in the homestead at some time prior to 1929.

George Bell, who had arrived at the station at age 13, died after in 2007 at age 87 after working the 2,000 square kilometres (772 sq mi) for all of his working life. His son Daryl took over the property.

The land occupying the extent of the Dulkaninna pastoral lease was gazetted by the Government of South Australia as a locality in April 2013 under the name 'Dulkaninna'.

== See also ==
- List of ranches and stations
