= Lake Eyre, South Australia =

Lake Eyre South Australia
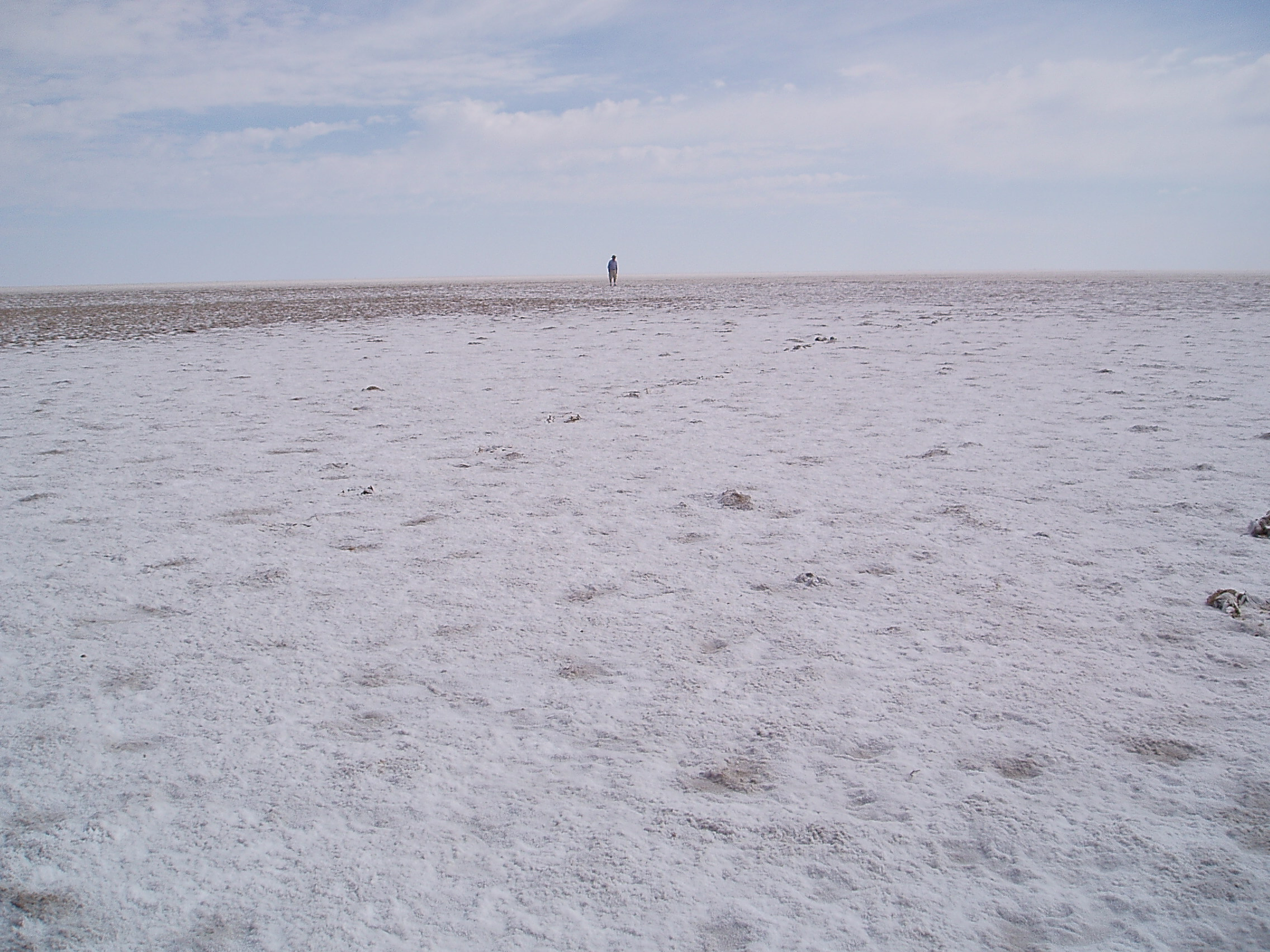
- Salt Crust on Lake Eyre gives way to slippery mud

- Coordinates: 28.537°S 137.497°E
- Population: no data available (2016 census)
- Established: 2013
- Postcode(s): 5733
- Time zone: ACST (UTC+9:30)
  - Summer (DST): ACST (UTC+10:30)
- Location: 718 km (446 mi) north of Adelaide; 134 km (83 mi) north of Marree
- LGA(s): Pastoral Unincorporated Area
- Region: Far North
- State electorate(s): Stuart
- Federal division(s): Grey
Mean max temp	Mean min temp	Annual rainfall
28.8 °C; 84 °F	13.3 °C; 56 °F	161.8 mm 6.4 in
Suburbs around Lake Eyre:
Anna Creek	Kalamurina	Kalamurina
Anna Creek	Lake Eyre	Mungeranie; Mulka; Etadunna; Clayton Station
Anna Creek; Stuarts Creek	Stuarts Creek; Callanna; Muloorina	Muloorina
- Footnotes: Location; Coordinates; Climate; Adjoining localities

Lake Eyre is a locality in the Australian state of South Australia located about 718 kilometres (446 miles) north of the state capital of Adelaide and 134 kilometres (83 miles) north of the town of Marree and which is associated with the occasional body of water known as Lake Eyre.

The locality was established on 26 April 2013 in respect to “the long established local name.” Its name is derived from the former Lake Eyre National Park.

The locality covers the full extent of Lake Eyre including islands within the lake’s extent, the Hunt Peninsula at the southern coast of the northern part of the lake and land on the lake’s east side.

The principal land use within the locality is conservation with its full extent being occupied by the following protected areas - the Elliot Price Conservation Park and the Kati Thanda-Lake Eyre National Park.

Lake Eyre is located within the federal Division of Grey, the state electoral district of Stuart, the Pastoral Unincorporated Area of South Australia and the state’s Far North region.

== See also ==
- Murrili meteorite
