= Lake Gregory (South Australia) =

Salt lake in South Australia

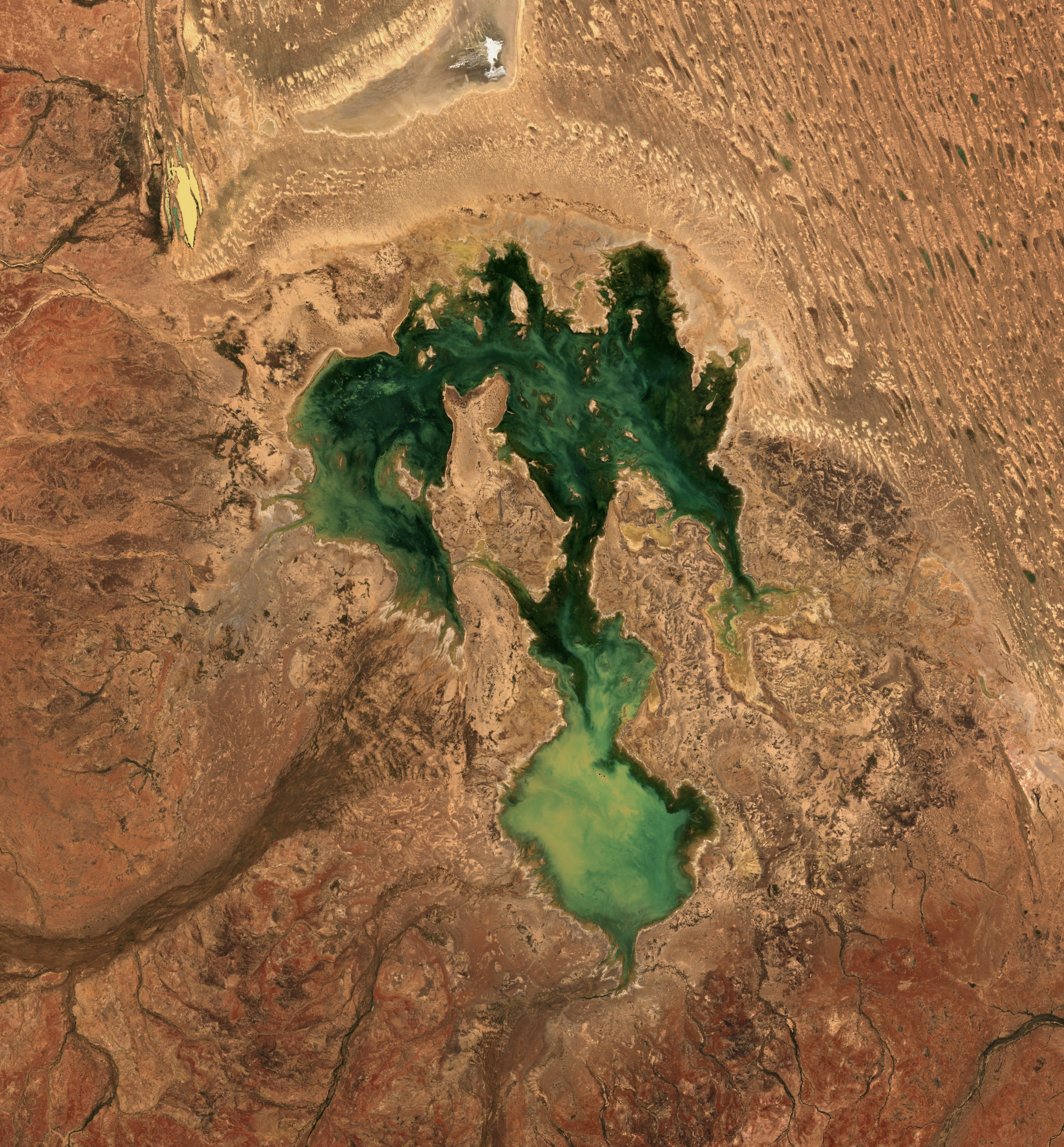
- Sentinel-2 image (2022)

- Location in South Australia
- Location: Dulkaninna, Etadunna and Murnpeowie
- Coordinates: 28°54′40″S 139°01′15″E
- Type: Salt lake
- Primary outflows: Evaporation
- Basin countries: Australia
- Designation: DIWA wetland
- Max. length: 26 kilometres (16 mi)
- Max. width: 14 kilometres (9 mi)
- Surface area: 290 square kilometres (113 mi^{2})

Lake Gregory is a salt lake in the Far North region of South Australia. The lake lies to the west of Lake Blanche; to the east the Birdsville Track runs in between it and Lake Eyre.

== Hydrology ==
Lake Gregory is fed by local rainfall and by overflows from Lake Blanche to its east. It was filled in 1974, 1984 and 1990.

== Natural history ==
The lake is located within the boundaries of the 'Strzelecki Creek Wetland System', a DIWA wetland, and the Strzelecki Desert Lakes Important Bird Area.

== History ==
It is named after the explorer Augustus Charles Gregory, who first passed by it in 1858. Originally Lake Eyre was named Lake Gregory by B. H. Babbage, but the names were modified by Governor Richard Graves MacDonnell, who preferred to name the former after the famous explorer who first investigated the region twenty years prior, Edward John Eyre.

== Economy ==
The lands around the lake are used for pastoralism, with both sheep and cattle grazing the surrounding plains. Dulkaninna Station is located near the south west corner of the lake.

== See also ==
- List of lakes of Australia § South Australia
