= Ptilotus parvifolius =

Scientific classification
- Kingdom: Plantae
- Clade: Tracheophytes
- Clade: Angiosperms
- Clade: Eudicots
- Order: Caryophyllales
- Family: Amaranthaceae
- Genus: Ptilotus
- Species: P. parvifolius

Binomial name
- Ptilotus parvifolius (F.Muell.) F.Muell.

Synonyms
- Ptilotus parvifolius (F.Muell.) F.Muell. var. parvifolius; Trichinium parvifolium F.Muell.; Ptilotus parvifolius var. laetus auct. non Benl: Benl, G. (1970) p.p.; Ptilotus parvifolius var. laetus auct. non Benl: Benl, G. in Jessop, J.P. & Toelken, H.R. (ed.) (1986) p.p.

Species of plant

Ptilotus parvifolius, commonly known as shrubby fox-tail, is a species of flowering plant of the family Amaranthaceae and is endemic to South Australia. It is a rounded, widely branched, spiny, glabrous shrub, with narrowly egg-shaped leaves, sometimes with the narrower end towards the base, and spikes of pinkish or pinkish-purple flowers.

== Description ==
Ptilotus parvifolius is an intricately and widely branched, spiny shrub that typically grows to a height of 30 cm (12 in) and has glabrous, pale brown, striated stems. The leaves are more or less sessile, egg-shaped, sometimes with the narrower end towards the base, 15–55 mm (0.59–2.17 in) long, 0.5–2 mm (0.020–0.079 in) wide, with a few scattered hairs on the lower surface. The flowers are borne in short spikes with ten to twenty flowers on a rachis usually up to 20 mm (0.79 in) long. There are leathery, golden brown bracts 3.0–3.5 mm (0.12–0.14 in) long and bracteoles 4–5.3 mm (0.16–0.21 in) long at the base of the flowers. The perianth is 11–12 mm (0.43–0.47 in) long and pink to pinkish-purple, the two outer tepals 1 mm (0.039 in) longer than the inner tepals. The stamens are 4.5–6.5 mm (0.18–0.26 in) long and there are three hairy staminodes, the ovary is mostly glabrous and the style is eccentric and straight, 6–7 mm (0.24–0.28 in) long.

== Taxonomy ==
This species was first formally described in 1859 by Ferdinand von Mueller, who gave it the name Trichinium parvifolium in the Report on the plants collected during Mr Babbage's expedition into the north- western interior of South Australia in 1858, from a specimen collected near Stuart's Creek. In 1868, Ferdinand von Mueller transferred the species to Ptilotus as P. parvifolium in his Fragmenta Phytographiae Australiae. The specific epithet (parvifolium) means 'small-leaved'.

== Distribution and habitat ==
Ptilotus parvifolius grows in skeletal soil on scree slopes, flats and drainage lines on the edges of salt lakes, between Lake Eyre South, Lake Torrens and Woomera, in South Australia.
