= Kati Thanda–Lake Eyre National Park =

National park in South Australia

Kati Thanda-Lake Eyre National Park
- IUCN category VI (protected area with sustainable use of natural resources)
- Location within South Australia
- Location: South Australia
- Nearest city: Marree
- Coordinates: 28°22′13″S 137°22′51″E
- Area: 13,488.37 km^{2} (5,207.89 sq mi)
- Established: 31 October 1985
- Governing body: Arabana aboriginal people DEW
- Website: Official website

Kati Thanda-Lake Eyre National Park, formerly known as Lake Eyre National Park, is a protected area in the Australian state of South Australia. It is located 697 km north of the state capital of Adelaide within the gazetted locality of Lake Eyre. It contains both the north and south sections of Lake Eyre as well as sections of the Tirari Desert.

The national park was gazetted as a national park under the National Parks and Wildlife Act 1972 (SA) on 31 October 1985. It protects dry desert landscapes, the nation's largest salt lake, Kati Thanda-Lake Eyre, and the lowest point on the mainland. At this time, restrictions were put on activities allowed in the park, "including swimming, driving off designated tracks, boating and landing aircraft". The national park is classified as an IUCN Category VI protected area.

In 2012, the national park became subject to a co-management agreement between the Arabana people and the Department of Environment, Water and Natural Resources (now Department for Environment and Water). The national park almost encloses Elliot Price Conservation Park, which covers the Hunt Peninsula and Brooks Island, within and around the northern section of the lake. It was established as South Australia's first arid zone conservation zone. It was named after Elliot Price, from the nearby Muloorina Station. There is limited vehicle access to the park.

The national park was renamed as Kati Thanda-Lake Eyre National Park on 14 November 2013.

When a new management plan was adopted in February 2025 after a period of public consultation that attracted over 230 responses, additional restrictions were added by the Department for Environment and Water, owing to concerns about environmental damage to the fragile salt crust of the lake and surrounding vegetation and ecosystem. Another concern is the potential danger to visitors, who may venture to the middle of the lake, where there is no mobile phone coverage, and find themselves disorientated if their vehicle becomes bogged or their vessel malfunctions.

== See also ==
- Protected areas of South Australia
- Lake Eyre Basin
