= The Happy Hippopotamus =

- Genre: drama play
- Running time: 30 mins (8:00 pm – 8:30 pm)
- Country of origin: Australia
- Language: English
- Home station: 2UW
- Starring: Bruce Stewart; Alexander Archdale
- Recording studio: Sydney
- Original release: March 2, 1953

The Happy Hippopotamus is a 1953 Australian radio play that aired as an episode of The Rola Show.

It was a rare Australian play of the 1950s that touched on aboriginal themes.

== Premise ==
According to ABC Weekly it was the "story of a scientific expedition that went to Kati Tanda (Lake Eyre) to try to capture a huge animal the blacks said would come there to die. When the party found it they were amazed, but only Jack Barton and Kathy Wells could see it as it really was, a creature of the past, piteous in its life of loneliness and terror, stumbling and half blind."
