= Dhirari =

Aboriginal Australian people

The Dhirari (or Dirari or Tirari) were an indigenous Australian people of the Far North of South Australia. They are not to be confused with the Diyari people, though the Dirari/Dhirari language (now extinct) was a dialect of the Diyari language.

== Name ==
Some confusion arose when, in 1904, the ethnographer A. W. Howitt confused this distinct, if small, tribe with their neighbours, the Diyari, suggesting it was a name for a horde of the latter. The German missionary Otto Siebert testified in 1936 that the Tirari's speech differed from Diyari language.

== Country ==
Norman Tindale estimated their tribal lands as covering roughly 4,500 square miles (12,000 km^{2}). They dwelt around the eastern shore of Lake Eyre, running northwards from Muloorina to the Warburton River. Their eastern frontiers were at Killalapaninna.

== History of contact ==
The Tirari were extinct by the time of Tindale's writing (1974). Their name is memorialized in the toponym denoting part of the land they occupied, Tirari Desert.

== Sources ==
- Howitt, Alfred William (1904). The native tribes of south-east Australia (PDF). Macmillan.
- Strehlow, C. (1910). Leonhardi, Moritz von (ed.). Die Aranda- und Loritja-Stämme in Zentral-Australien Part 3 (PDF). Joseph Baer & Co.
- Tindale, Norman Barnett (1974). "Tirari (SA)". Aboriginal Tribes of Australia: Their Terrain, Environmental Controls, Distribution, Limits, and Proper Names. Australian National University Press. ISBN 978-0-708-10741-6.
