= Cowarie Station =

Pastoral lease in South Australia

Coordinates: 27.70203°S 138.33585°E

Location in South Australia

Cowarie Station, most commonly known as Cowarie, is a pastoral lease that operates as a cattle station in north east South Australia.

The property is located 216 kilometres (134 mi) north of Marree and 225 kilometres (140 mi) south west of Birdsville. The Diamantina River merges with the Mulligan River on Cowarie forming the Warburton River which continues to flow to the south west and into Lake Eyre.

== History ==
The lease was initially granted for 21 years to William Benjamin Rounsevell starting on the last day of 1875, covering an area of 400 square miles (1,036 km^{2}) and named Cowarie after a nearby hill. The name is Aboriginal in origin and is the name for marsupial rat common to the area. Many other leases in the area were also soon taken up leading to much greater traffic along the Birdsville track and a post office opened at Cowarie in 1877.

Sidney Kidman in partnership with his brother Sackville acquired Cowarie in 1895, the first property acquired by the Kidmans who went on to build the largest cattle empire seen in Australia.

The station was managed by Sharon Oldfield in 1999 and occupied an area of 3,937 square kilometres (1,520 sq mi). The same year Oldfield won the commonwealth Bank Ibis award for rural productivity in recognition of her work with wildlife management and conservation on the property.

In 2009 the station was running a mixture of shorthorn and Santa Gertrudis cattle which benefitted from the floodwaters flowing down the Diamantina River that reached the station that year.

== Mirra Mitta Bore ==
The bore was sunk in 1903 as part of the governments plan to sink bores along the Birdsville-Marree stock route in order to provide a permanent water supply. The bore is over 1,000 metres (3,281 ft) deep and is popular stopping place along the Birdsville Track. The bore site consists of a horizontal pipe from the head of a bore, discharging hot artesian water in a circular pond about 5 metres (16 ft) in diameter. The waters then flow along a bore drain.

== See also ==
- List of ranches and stations
