= Elliot Price Conservation Park =

Protected area in South Australia

- IUCN category Ia (strict nature reserve)
- Location within South Australia
- Location: South Australia, Lake Eyre
- Nearest city: Marree
- Coordinates: 28°46′44″S 137°18′10″E
- Area: 634.53 km^{2} (244.99 sq mi)
- Established: 9 November 1967
- Governing body: Department for Environment and Water

Elliot Price Conservation Park, formerly the Elliot Price Wilderness National Park, is a protected area in the Australian state of South Australia located in the gazetted locality of Lake Eyre with its southern boundary being located about 90 kilometres (56 miles) north west of Marree.

The land first received protected area status as the Elliot Price Wilderness National Park established on 9 November 1967 under the National Parks Act 1996. On 27 April 1972, the national park was reconstituted as the Elliot Price Conservation Park under the National Parks and Wildlife Act 1972.

It occupies land on the Hunt Peninsula and on Brooks Island at the southern end of Lake Eyre as well as some adjoining land which is subject to inundation during periodic flooding. It is immediately adjoined on its west, north and east sides by the Kati Thanda-Lake Eyre National Park. As of 2013, the conservation park is closed to public access.

In 1980, the conservation park was described as follows:

Elliott Price Conservation Park encompasses Hunt Peninsula, a long tongue of land jutting 40km northwards into Lake Eyre north, between Madigan Gulf and Jackboot Bay. The surface of the peninsula consists largely of limestone partly covered in its southern parts by a thin layer of wind-blown sand. Parts of the peninsula are occupied by saltpans or depressions similar to the bed of Lake Eyre itself. The limestone forms prominent cliffs in places along the shoreline. Elsewhere the cliffs are eroded and in places sand hummocks are stabilised by nitre bush. Preserves important area of ungrazed arid wilderness, providing benchmark against which effects of range land grazing can be compared. Rare plant species Cassia nemophila, C. oligophylla, Goodenia mitchellii, Grevillea nematophylla and Frankenia foliosa and uncommon bird species Tyto longimembris (grass owl) and Amytornis barbatus (grey grass-wren) occur. Named after Elliott Price who offered to surrender his pastoral lease on the area for purposes of conservation.

The conservation park is classified as an IUCN Category Ia protected area. In 1980, it was listed on the now-defunct Register of the National Estate.
