= Marree Mosque =

Former mosque in Marree, South Australia, Australia

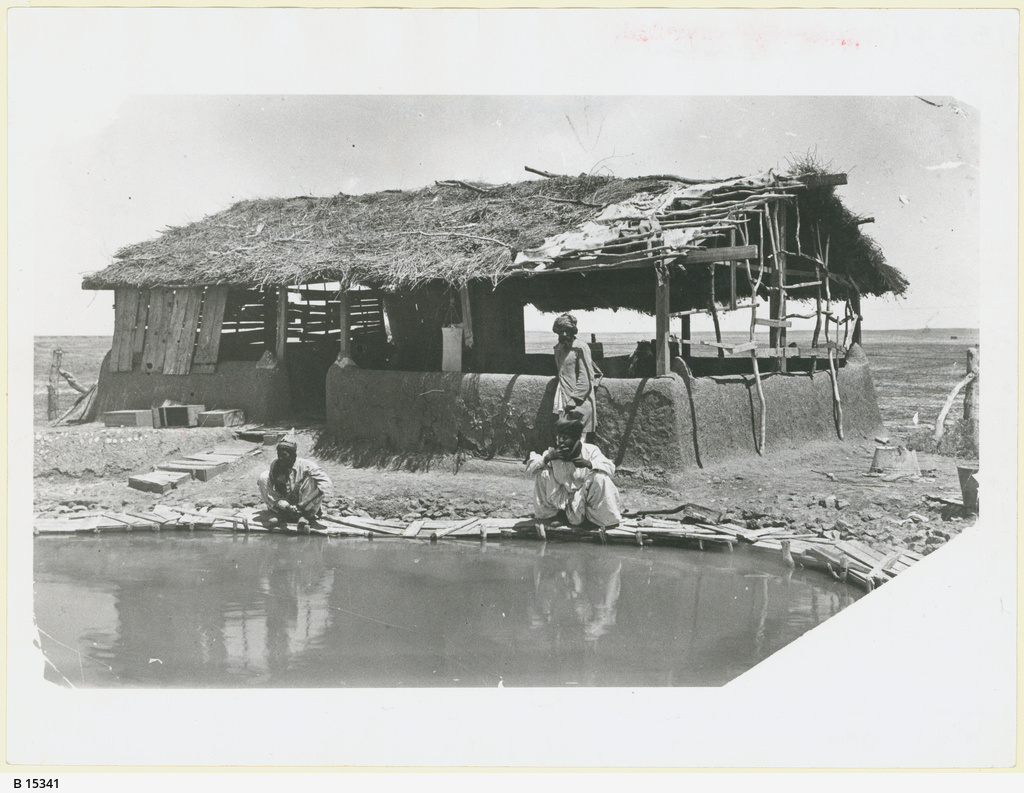
- The Mosque at Hergott Springs. The pool in the foreground was used by worshippers for washing their feet before entering the Mosque.

- Location in South Australia

Religion
- Affiliation: Islam (former)
- Ecclesiastical or organizational status: Mosque (former)
- Status: Abandoned

Location
- Location: Marree, South Australia, Australia
- Interactive map of Marree Mosque
- Coordinates: 29°39′05″S 138°03′47″E

Architecture
- Founder: Abdul Kadir
- Completed: c. 1882

The Marree Mosque is a former mosque located in Marree, South Australia, Australia.

== History ==
The mosque was completed in c. 1882 (some sources indicate as early as 1861), by members of the South Australian Afghan community. These "Afghans" were generally Muslims from then-British India, although some came from Afghanistan and the Middle East. They worked as cameldrivers and breeders in the region. Figures indicate an approximation that 3,000 "Ghans" were involved in this type of work until it was overtaken by the car and train in the 1930s.

The mosque was constructed by camel breeder Abdul Kadir, owner of Wangamanna Station. Another cameleer, Mullah Assim Khan, became imam of the Marree mosque in the early 20th century. The town had two mosques for some time, before the northern one was abandoned around 1910. Another report indicates that a mosque was deliberately demolished in 1956 by its elderly caretaker, Syed Goolamdeen, who could no longer maintain it.

As of 2003, it was reported in one source that the descendants of the Afghans in Marree have rebuilt the mosque. However, a heritage survey funded by the Australian and South Australian governments and which was conducted from April 2001 to June 2002 reveals that the mosque no longer exists apart from an area of prepared ground and post stubs, and the nearby remains of an enclosure for camels. The report of the heritage survey which was published in 2002 reports that a "replica mosque" had been built within the Marree township. A tourist map published in 2018 shows a mosque within a park called the "Afghan Camellier Park" (sic) located within the alignment of the former Central Australia Railway which passed through the town.

== See also ==
- History of Islam in Australia
- List of mosques in Australia
- List of first mosques by country
