= Mundowdna Station =

Pastoral lease in South Australia

Coordinates: 29.733°S 138.232°E

Location in South Australia

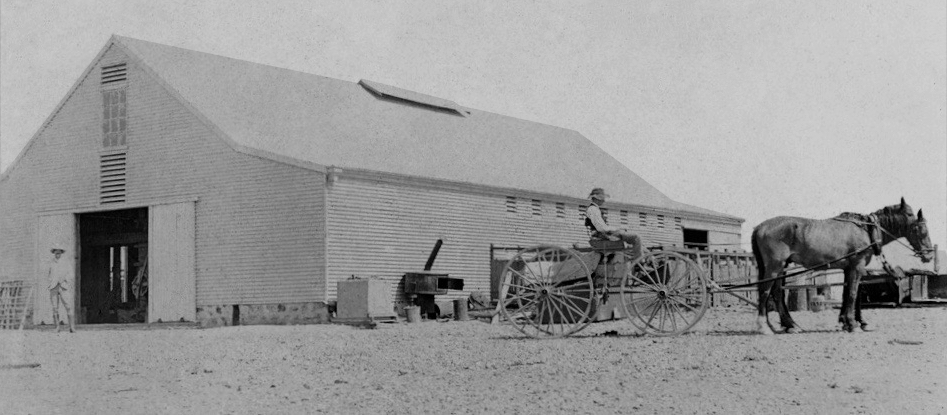
Mundowdna Woolshed ca. 1897

Horse drawn buggy outside a stone building at Mundowdna Station ca. 1898

Mundowdna Station, most commonly known as Mundowdna, is a pastoral lease that operates as a cattle station in north east South Australia.

It is situated about 20 kilometres (12 mi) south east of Marree and 62 kilometres (39 mi) north of Lyndhurst along the Frome River.

== History ==
The lease for a run was first taken out in 1859 by T. and A. Matthews.

The name of the station is Aboriginal in origin and is taken from a water hole found in the area. The Governor of South Australia visited the area during a severe drought in 1859. E. Chapman established Mundowdna in 1860. Shortly afterwards the property, along with neighbouring St. Stephen's Pond were owned by the Matthews brothers, who complained about Aboriginal people killing their stock in 1863.

Edgar Chapman was in possession of Mundowdna in 1880 and had it stocked with cattle, selling 600 head in two lots at the Adelaide market. Chapman advertised to auction the property in 1883 when it was stocked with 4500 head of cattle and 150 horses and took up an area of 1,212 square miles (3,139 km^{2}). Presumably the property sold, and was owned by Edward Russell in 1886, who kept it until at least 1893. By 1896 the property was owned by Frank Whyte. The property was still owned by John Whyte and his nephew Frank Whyte in 1891 and was about 800 square miles (2,072 km^{2}) in area. Cattle and sheep had both been stocked on the property to this time.

In 1904 the property was put up for auction following the dissolution of a partnership where one partner, John Whyte, died. Mundowdna was offered along with neighbouring Lake Torrens station. Together the leases occupied an area of approximately 1,260 square miles (3,263 km^{2}) and were stocked with 15,000 sheep, 65 horses and 18 cattle. The bidders included Sidney Kidman but the property was sold to Mr. W. Leslie Whyte for the sum of £10,700 along with all plant and stock. The Messrs Whyte and Co. put up the property for sale later the same year along with about 10,000 sheep on 638 square miles (1,652 km^{2}). The property was not sold until later, in 1906, when it was purchased by Sidney Kidman. Kidman acquired the property as it lies at the southern end of the Birdsville Track and close to the railway terminus at Marree.

The property was struck by drought in 1908 and Kidman had his store cattle sent north by rail on a special train to The Peake to find feed and water.

Over 2,000 horses were destroyed at Mundowdna over seven months in 1925 after horse-breeding had become unprofitable.

In 1930 the station received its best rain for 20 years, with 2.67 inches (68 mm) falling over a short period. Creeks were running and dams were full after the drought-breaking falls.

The station currently occupies an area of 2,200 square kilometres (849 sq mi) and is owned by the Litchfield family, who also own nearby Wilpoorinna Station. The family arrived in the area in 1958 and raise Santa Gertrudis cattle for the local beef market as well as merino sheep. Recently Dorper sheep have been introduced to produce salt bush mutton.

The land occupying the extent of the Mundowdna Station pastoral lease was gazetted as a locality by the Government of South Australia on 26 April 2013 under the name "Mundowdna".

== See also ==
- List of ranches and stations
