= Stuarts Creek, South Australia =

Remote locality in South Australia

Stuarts Creek
- Town
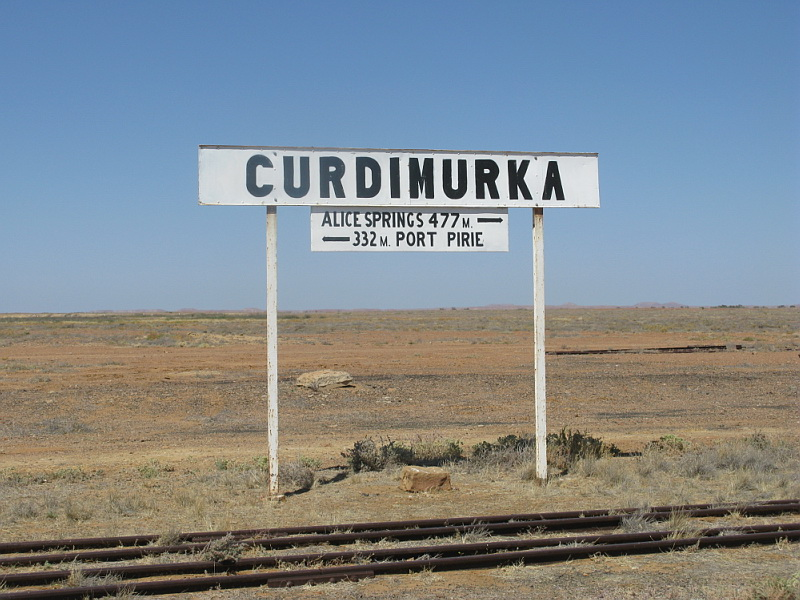
- Sign at Curdimurka rail siding, on the former Central Australia Railway at Stuarts Creek (2012)

- Coordinates: 29°37′52″S 137°02′56″E
- Country: Australia
- State: South Australia
- Region: Far North
- LGA: Pastoral Unincorporated Area
- Established: 26 April 2013

Government
  - State electorates: Giles; Stuart
  - Federal division: Grey

Population
  - Total: 0 (2016 census)
- Time zone: UTC+9:30 (ACST)
  - Summer (DST): UTC+10:30 (ACDT)
- Postcode: 5720
- Mean max temp: 29.1 °C (84.4 °F)
- Mean min temp: 14.0 °C (57.2 °F)
- Annual rainfall: 142.2 mm (5.60 in)
Localities around Stuarts Creek
Lake Eyre; Anna Creek	Lake Eyre	Lake Eyre
Anna Creek; Billa Kalina	Stuarts Creek	Lake Eyre; Callanna; Witchelina; Mulgaria
Parakylia	Roxby Downs Station	Andamooka Station

Stuarts Creek is a remote locality in the Australian state of South Australia in the states's Far North region. The name and boundaries were formalised on 26 April 2013, named after Stuart Creek Station, in respect of the long-established local name. It includes the former settlement of Coward Springs. The Wabma Kadarbu Mound Springs Conservation Park lies in the north-west of the locality.

The Central Australia Railway (on which the renowned passenger train, The Ghan, operated) ran through Stuarts Creek, with former stations or sidings at Coward Springs, Margaret, and Stuart Creek (later Curdimurka) all within its current boundaries. The railway remnants at Coward Springs and Curdimurka are listed on the South Australian Heritage Register.

The 2016 Australian census reported that Stuarts Creek had no people living within its boundaries.

Stuarts Creek is located within the federal division of Grey, the state electoral districts of Giles and Stuart and the Pastoral Unincorporated Area of South Australia.

== Heritage listings ==
Stuarts Creek has a number of heritage-listed sites, including:

- Coward Springs Railway Site
- Mount Hamilton Station Site
- Curdimurka Railway Siding Complex
- Tertiary Silcrete Fossil Flora, Stuarts Creek

== See also ==
- Marree, South Australia#Climate, nearest weather station
