= Mungeranie, South Australia =

Mungeranie South Australia
- Coordinates: 28°01′7.28″S 138°39′48.02″E
- Population: 14 (SAL 2021)
- Time zone: ACST (UTC+9:30)
  - Summer (DST): ACDT (UTC+10:30)
- Location: 204 km (127 mi) N of Maree
- LGA(s): Pastoral Unincorporated Area
- State electorate(s): Stuart
- Federal division(s): Grey

Mungeranie or Mungerannie, comprising Mungerannie Hotel and Mungerannie Station, is a homestead on the Birdsville Track in northeastern South Australia. Located 204 kilometres (127 mi) north of Marree, South Australia and 313 kilometres (194 mi) south of Birdsville, Queensland the hotel is the only fuel and supplies depot on the Birdsville Track. The name "Mungeranie" is Aboriginal for "big ugly face".

The homestead and airstrip 500 metres (1,640 ft) away comprise the pastoral station. The separately owned Mungerannie Hotel is on adjacent freehold land. Mungaranie stands on the edge of the Sturt Stony, Tirari, Simpson and Strzelecki Deserts, nestled beside the Derwent Creek. A permanent waterhole fed by an artesian bore from the Great Artesian Basin has established a local wetlands which provides a habitat for 110 bird species. The annual rainfall in the area is 130.6 mm (5.14 in).

Richard Forbes Sullivan opened a depot and hotel at the present site along the Birdsville track in 1886 to supply shepherds, drovers and travellers. In 1888 William Crombie took up a block nearby to rest horses and water cattle. By 1889 Robert Rowe took over the store and in 1901 the government sunk a bore to supply permanent water.

A cattle station and a police station were established in 1903, a school was built in 1915 and in 1920 Mungerannie was the head office of the Great Northern League which sought the creation of the separate state of Brachina. The cattle station was also once part of the Cowarie and Kanowna runs.
