= Etadunna Airstrip =

Airport in Australia

- IATA: ETD; ICAO: YEDA

Summary
- Location: Etadunna, South Australia
- Coordinates: 28°44′39″S 138°35′23″E

Map
- Location in South Australia

Runways
Direction	Length		Surface
Direction	ft	m	Surface
17/35	3,904	1,190	Dirt
09/27	3,805	1,160	Dirt

Etadunna Airstrip (IATA: ETD, ICAO: YEDA) is a locally owned, public airstrip in South Australia.

== Facilities ==
There are two runways active at the airstrip:

- Runway 1 is the main runway with a length of 1190 m (3904 ft) with an approximate heading of 17/35.
- Runway 2 is the secondary runway which has a length of 1160 m (3805 ft) with an approximate heading of 09/27.

== See also ==
- List of airports in South Australia
