= Muloorina =

Pastoral lease in South Australia

Coordinates: 29°14′22″S 137°54′20″E

Location in South Australia

Muloorina is both a pastoral lease that operates as a cattle station and a formal bounded locality in South Australia. The name and boundaries of the locality were created on 26 April 2013 after the long-established local name.

The property is situated approximately 48 kilometres (30 mi) north of Marree and 156 kilometres (97 mi) east of William Creek. It is located on the edge of Lake Eyre, and Frome Creek runs through a portion of the station.

The station currently occupies an area of 4,000 square kilometres (1,544 sq mi) and runs both sheep and cattle.

The property was established some time prior to 1880 on Tirari tribal land. By 1938 it was owned by Stan and Elliot Price and was under the management of Ellery Talbot. The property was flooded in 1938 when Frome Creek broke its banks.

In 1964, Donald Campbell and his 500 strong entourage stayed at the 800-square-kilometre (309 sq mi) property when he set the land speed record on the dry Lake Eyre in his car, Bluebird.

The historic Lake Harry Date Plantation Site is located at Muloorina and listed on the South Australian Heritage Register.

== See also ==
- List of ranches and stations
