= Murnpeowie =

Pastoral lease in South Australia

Coordinates: 29.594°S 139.051°E

Location in South Australia

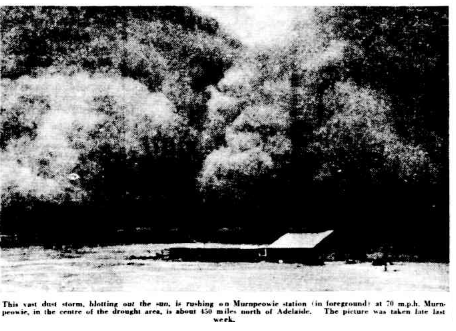
Dust storm over homestead in 1952

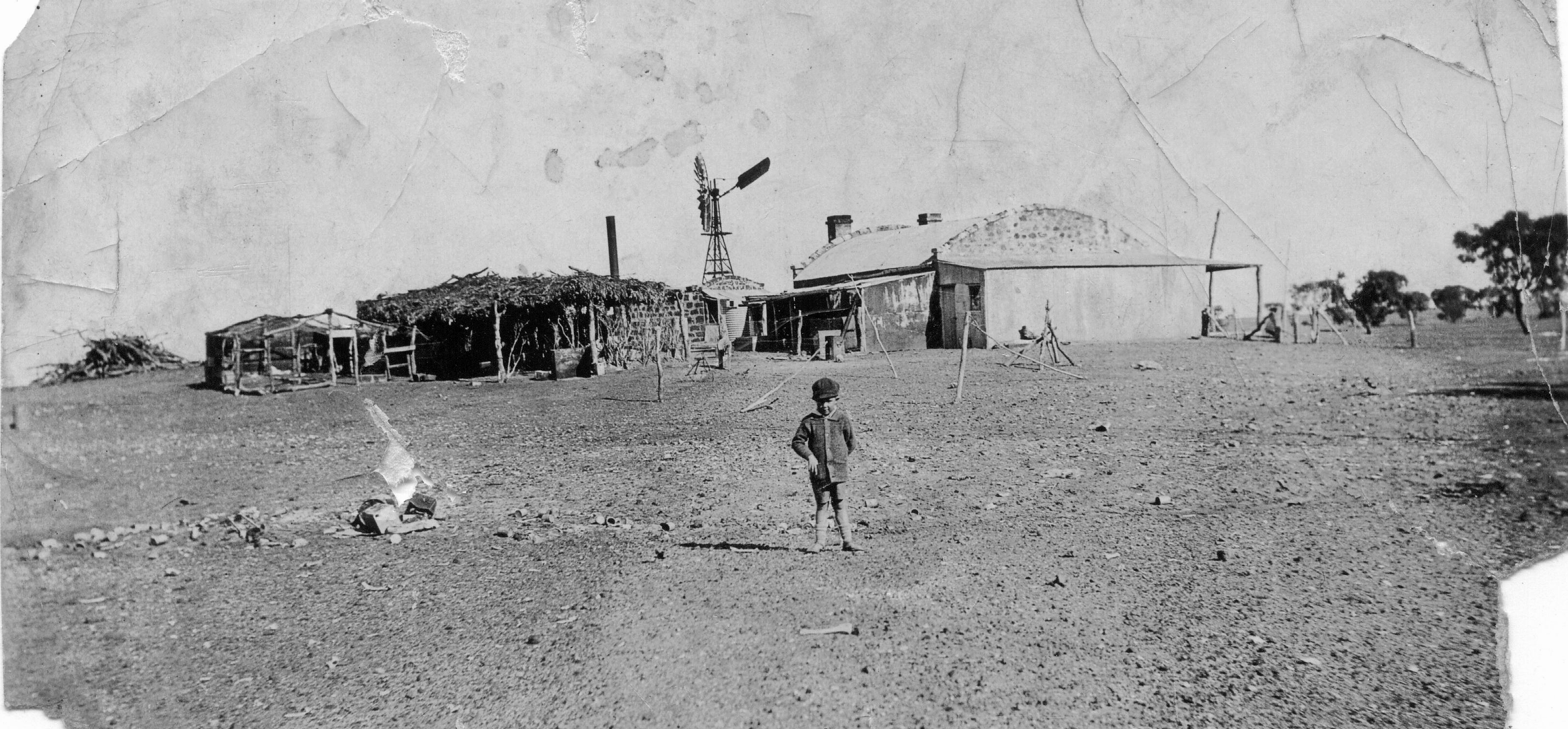
Murnpeowie Station c.1926

Murnpeowie or Murnpeowie Station is a pastoral lease in outback South Australia. The pastoral lease once operated as a sheep station but now operates as a cattle station. The land occupying the extent of the pastoral lease was gazetted as a locality by the Government of South Australia on 26 April 2013, with the name "Murnpeowie".

It is located approximately 96 kilometres (60 mi) east of Marree and 102 kilometres (63 mi) north east of Lyndhurst. The area is composed of gibber plains that support dense stands Mitchell grass and saltbush.

The unusual name is Aboriginal in origin and means place of the bronzewing pigeon.

Leases in the area were taken up by John Baker in 1857, with more added through the 1860s. Baker was surrounded by leases held by Thomas Elder. When Baker died in 1872, Elder consolidated all of the runs into a single entity of approximately 4,000 square miles (10,360 km^{2}) named Blanchewater Horse Station, with a carrying capacity of 20,000 head. The homestead was constructed in the 1880s, the woolshed in 1890. Both buildings had stone walls and round iron roofs. By 1894, the station was shearing 106,000 sheep, yielding 2,400 bales of wool. In 1909, a total of 120,000 sheep were shorn at Murnpeowie. The Blanchewater Homestead Ruins are listed on both the South Australian Heritage Register and the former Register of the National Estate.

In 1910, boundary riders at the station discovered a meteorite. The 2,520-pound (1,143 kg) stone was thought to be a rock until the men struck it with a hammer and were amazed by the bell-like sound they heard. A small sample was sent to the School of Mines for analysis and once confirmed the meteorite was donated.

In 1920, the property was carrying 90,000 sheep. By 1924, the station was approximately 4,000 square miles (10,360 km^{2}) in size and was stocked with about 70,000 sheep. By 1935 the 3,500 square miles (9,065 km^{2}) was carrying 60,000 sheep.

The area was struck by drought and then huge dust storms in 1952. The property was purchased in 1998 by David and Nell Brook, who have stocked the property with Poll-Hereford cattle. The family holdings are certified organic and include Adria Downs and Cordillo Downs stations, encompassing a total area of 30,000 square kilometres (11,583 sq mi).

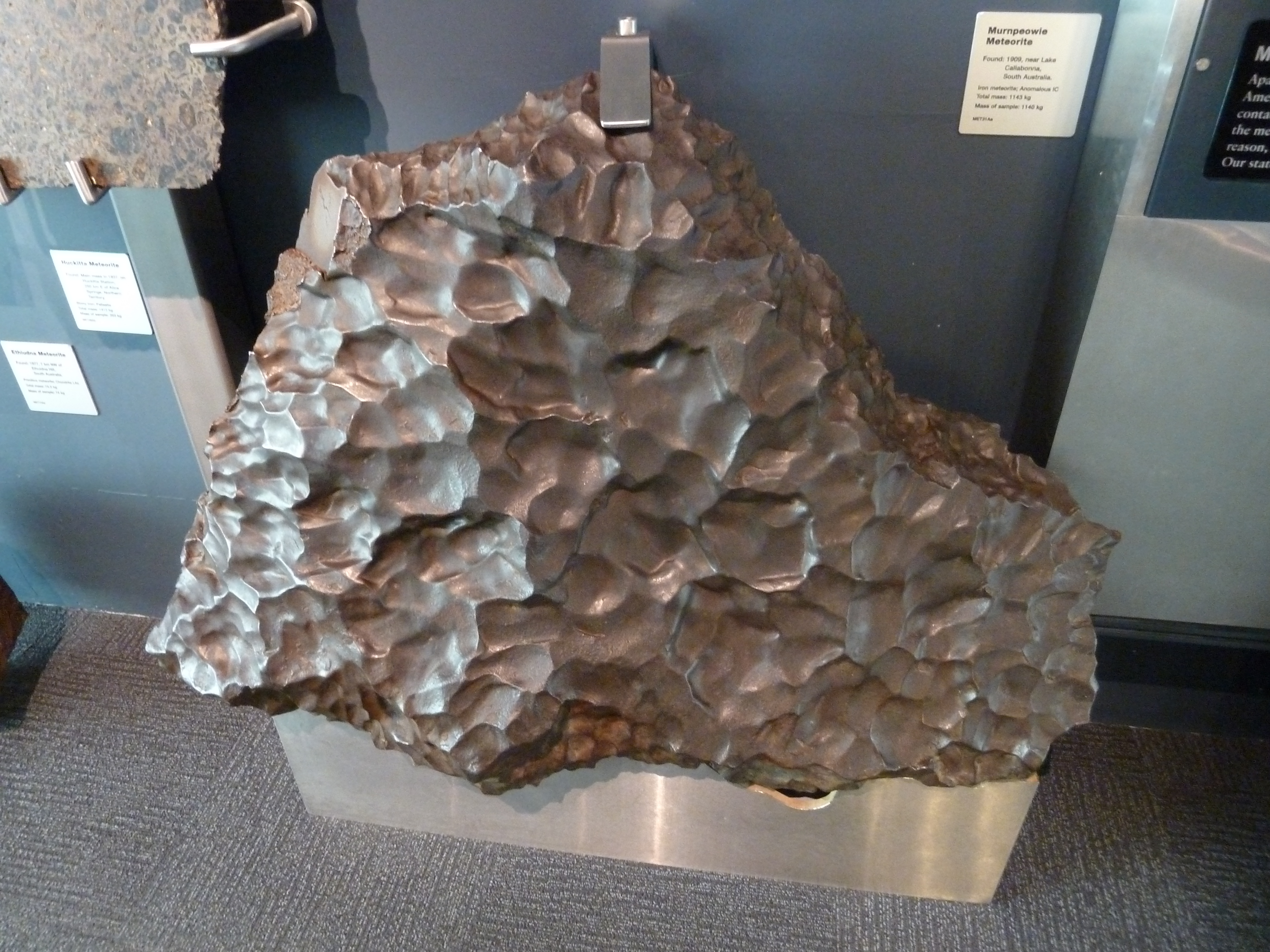
Murnpeowie meteorite in the South Australian Museum

== IBRA biogeographic subregion ==
Murnpeowie is also the name of an IBRA subregion (STP03), an area of 2,910,385 hectares (7,191,720 acres) in the Stony Plains IBRA biogeographic region.

== Historic Photographs ==
https://commons.wikimedia.org/wiki/File:Norman_Gray,_Mt_Hopeless_station_(now_Murnpeowie),_South_Australia_c._1926.jpg

== See also ==
- List of ranches and stations
