= Etadunna Station =

Pastoral lease in South Australia

Coordinates: 28°45′33″S 138°30′36″E

Location in South Australia

Etadunna is a pastoral lease in the Australian state of South Australia located in the gazetted locality of Etadunna and which is operating as a cattle station.

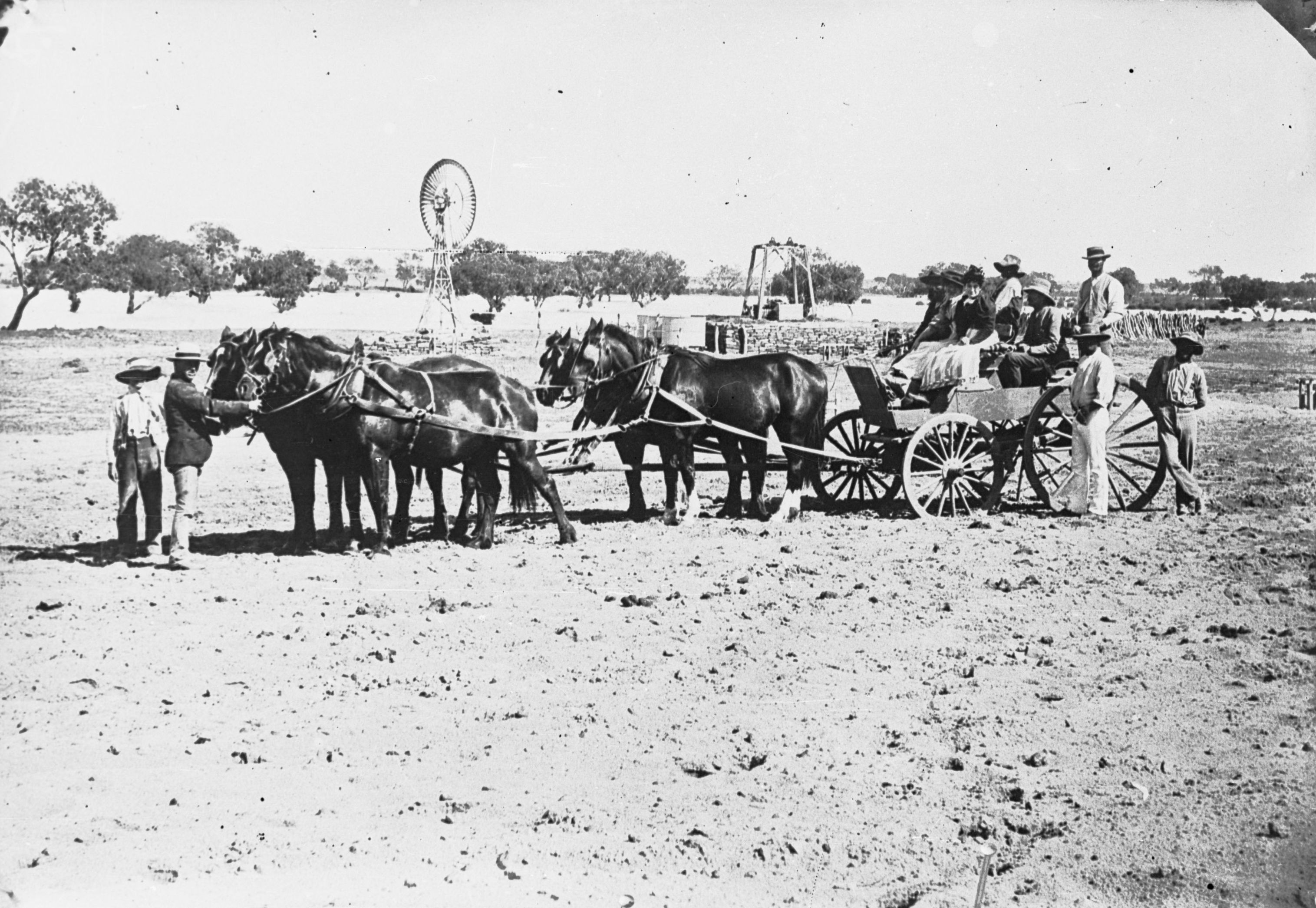
Mail coach running between Kopperamanna and Queensland border, c. 1905

In about 1867, German Lutheran missionaries J. F. Gossling and E. Homann, Brother Johann Ernst Jacob and lay-helper Hermann Heinrich Vogelsang (1832–1913), established Bethesda Mission at Lake Killalpaninna, which was extended to include two outstations, Kopperamanna, on the shore of Lake Kopperamanna, and Etadunna nearly twenty kilometres to the east of Bethesda.

In 1872 Kopperamanna was listed as a postal town and remained so for many years. However, in July the police station was closed and troopers transferred to other postings.

In 1885 a shearing shed was built at Etadunna and five years later an artesian bore was sunk at Kopperamanna and the mission was able to collect fees from passing drovers, adding to the missionaries' income, which came mainly from donations and the sale of wool.

During the 1897 season more than 28,000 sheep were shorn at the Etadunna shed, which had sixteen stands, eight for native shearers and eight for the whites. More than 22,000 sheep died soon after because of a severe drought.

During the time of the First World War, life began to turn as there was much distrust and so the mission was closed.

Eric Oldfield, whose family were by now well established in the area, bought up the lease of 6,216 square kilometres (2,400 sq mi) now called Etadunna Station, in 1945. Eric's son Bryan and his wife Kath took over Etadunna when Eric decided to take up Mungerannie Station further up the track.

The land occupying the extent of the Etadunna pastoral lease was gazetted as a locality in April 2013 under the name "Etadunna".

== See also ==
- List of ranches and stations
