= Kati Thanda–Lake Eyre =

Endorheic lake in South Australia

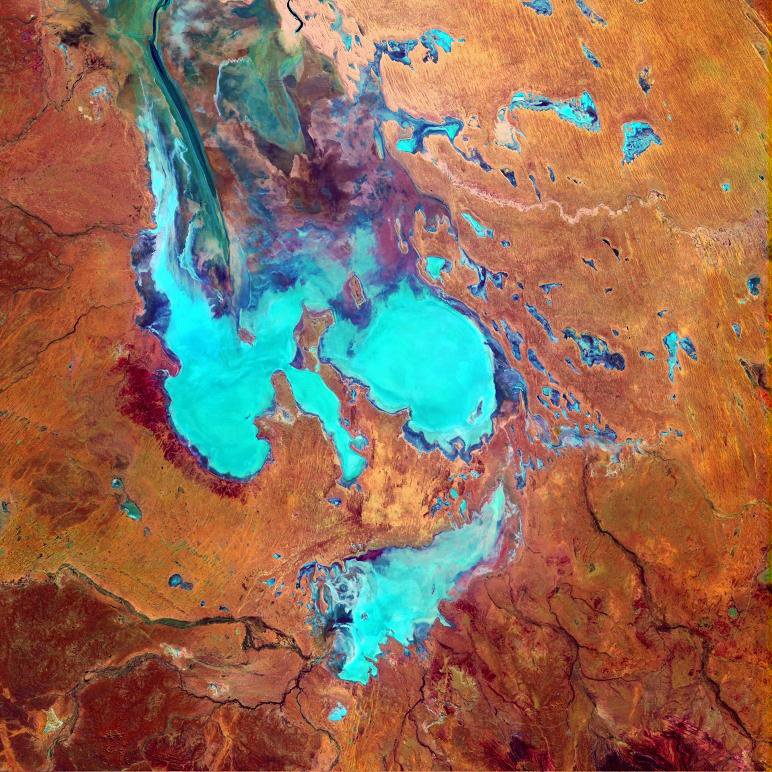
- Composite Landsat 7 satellite image in 1999 using shortwave infrared, near-infrared, and blue wavelengths

- Location within South Australia

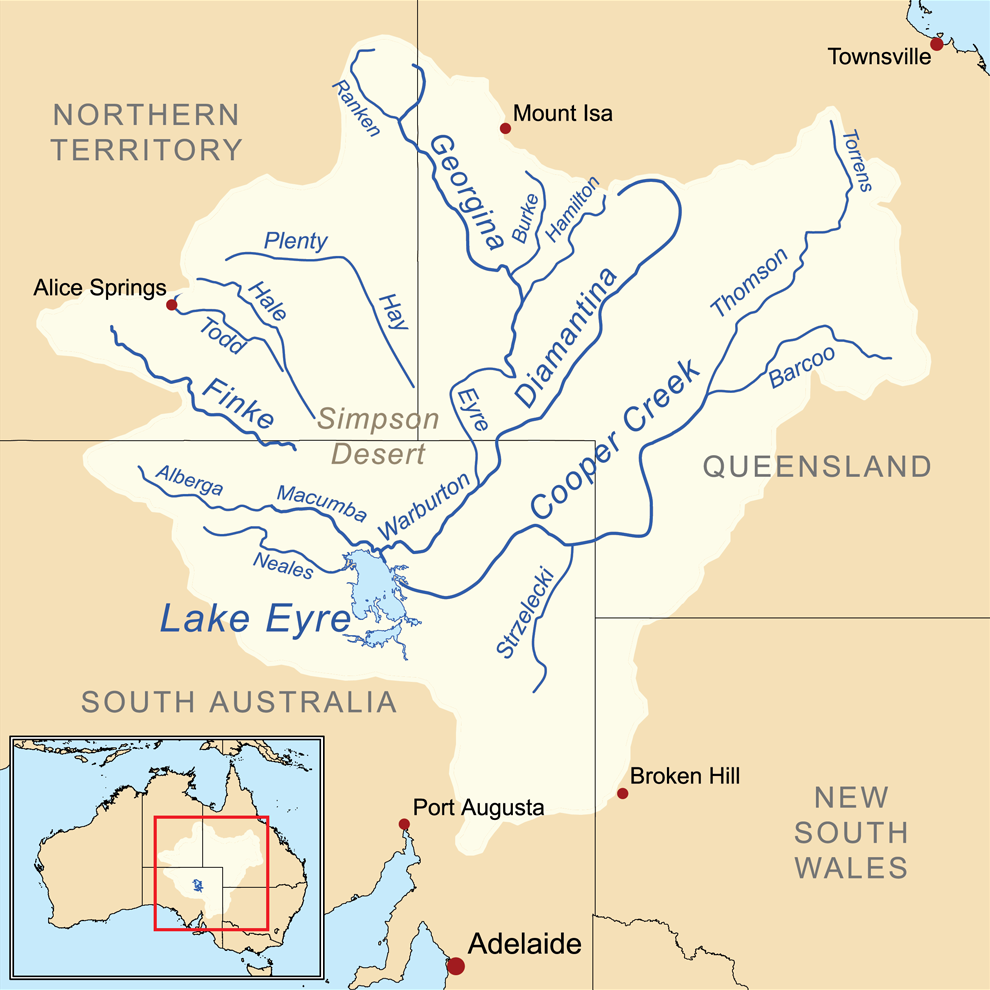
- Map of the Lake Eyre basin
- Location: Far North, South Australia
- Coordinates: 28°40′S 137°20′E
- Lake type: Ancient lake, Endorheic
- Primary inflows: Warburton River
- Basin countries: Australia
- Surface area: 9,500 km^{2} (3,668 sq mi) (max)
- Average depth: 1.5 m (5 ft) (every 3 years), 4 m (13 ft) (every decade)
- Surface elevation: −9 m (−30 ft) (shoreline when full); −15 m (−49 ft) (lowest point when empty)

Lake Eyre (/ɛər/ AIR), officially known as Kati Thanda–Lake Eyre, is an endorheic lake in the east-central part of the Far North region of South Australia, some 700 km (430 mi) north of Adelaide. It is the largest ephemeral endorheic lake on the Australian continent, covering over 9,000 km^{2} (3,500 sq mi). The shallow lake is the depocentre of the vast endorheic Lake Eyre basin, and contains the lowest natural point in Australia, at approximately 15 m (49 ft) below sea level. The lake is most often empty, filling mostly when flooding occurs upstream in Channel Country, but almost always partially. On the rare occasions that it fills completely (only three times between 1860 and 2025), it is the largest lake in Australia, covering an area of up to 9,500 km^{2} (3,668 sq mi). When the lake is full, it has the same salinity as seawater, but becomes hypersaline as the lake dries up and the water evaporates. To the north of the lake is the Simpson Desert.

The lake was named in honour of Edward John Eyre, the first European to see it in 1840. It was officially renamed in December 2012 to include its Aboriginal name in the Arabana language, Kati Thanda, in accordance with a policy of dual naming. The native title over most of the lake and surrounding region is held by the Arabana people, with the eastern portion allocated to the Dieri people.

The lake is one of the most important sites for waterbirds in Australia, and was the location of several attempts at creating a land speed record in the 1960s. The lake is covered by two protected areas: the Elliot Price Conservation Park (a small area, gazetted 1967) and the much larger Kati Thanda–Lake Eyre National Park surrounding it (gazetted 1985). When it was declared a national park, covering an area of 13,488.37 km^{2} (5,207.89 sq mi), restrictions were put on the activities of visitors to the park, including swimming, boating, off-track driving, and landing aircraft.

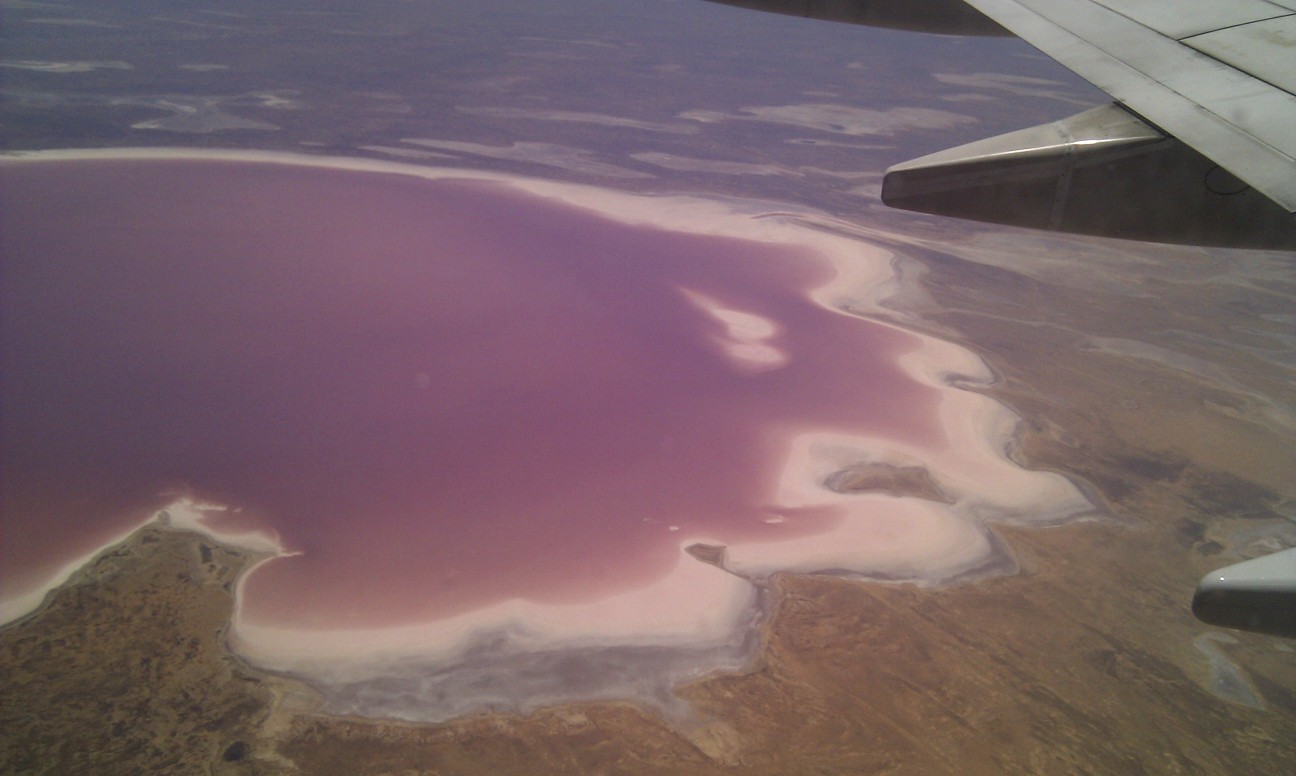
Kati Thanda–Lake Eyre seen from an aircraft in November 2011, showing pink colouration from algae

== History ==
=== Pre-colonial and colonial history ===
The lake lies mostly within the traditional lands of the Arabana people, for whom it holds deep spiritual significance in their Dreaming stories. The Dieri people have long ties to the eastern portion of the lake. Kuyani are the Traditional Owners of the Southern end of Lake Eyre and surroundings and also hold significant song and story lines on their Land.

In the 1860s, explorer Peter Egerton-Warburton wrote that the lake was dry, and "terrible in its death-like stillness and the vast expanse of its unbroken sterility". British geologist John Walter Gregory wrote in his 1906 book on central Australia that while the lake was sometimes described as "a fertile land of lakes", others called it a "desert of the worst type". He recognised its importance in the natural science of the continent: "For Lake Eyre, with its coasts and estuaries, was once the living heart of Australia".

=== Land speed record attempts ===
Kati Thanda–Lake Eyre has been a site for various land speed record attempts on its salt flats, similar to those found in the Bonneville Salt Flats, especially those by Donald Campbell with the Bluebird-Proteus CN7, in 1963 and 1964.

On 17 July 1964 in the CN7 on the Lake Eyre salt flats, Campbell set a land speed record of 403.10 mph (648.73 km/h) for a four-wheeled vehicle (Class A). Campbell was disappointed with the record speed, as the vehicle had been designed for 500 mph (800 km/h).

=== Naming and ownership ===
The lake was named by early colonists in South Australia in honour of Edward John Eyre, the first European to see it in 1840. It was officially renamed in December 2012 to include its Aboriginal name, Kati Thanda, in accordance with a policy of dual naming.

Native title over the lake and much of the surrounding region is held by the Arabana people since a Federal Court ruling in 2012. Native title is held by the Dieri people over the eastern portion of the lake.

== Protected area status ==
=== Statutory ===
The extent of the lake is covered by two protected areas declared by the Government of South Australia: the Elliot Price Conservation Park (a small area, gazetted November 1967) and the much larger Kati Thanda–Lake Eyre National Park (covering 13,488.37 km^{2} (5,207.89 sq mi) gazetted October 1985) which surrounds the conservation park on three sides.

As part of the gazetting of the national park under the National Parks and Wildlife Act 1972 (SA) in 1985, restrictions were put on activities allowed in the park, "including swimming, driving off designated tracks, boating and landing aircraft". When a new management plan was adopted in February 2025 after a period of public consultation that attracted over 230 responses, additional restrictions were added by the Department for Environment and Water, owing to concerns about environmental damage to the fragile salt crust and surrounding vegetation and ecosystem, which could last for years. Another concern is the potential danger to visitors, who may venture to the middle of the vast, remote lake, where there is no mobile phone coverage, and find themselves disorientated if their vehicle becomes bogged or their vessel malfunctions. There is rarely enough water to sail a boat on the lake, but in 2000, the Lake Eyre Yacht Club was established in the town of Marree, whose commodore Bob Backway was a critic of the restrictions.

=== Non-statutory ===
==== Wetlands ====
Lake Eyre is on the list of wetlands of national importance known as A Directory of Important Wetlands in Australia.

==== Important bird area ====
Lake Eyre has been identified by BirdLife International as an Important Bird Area (IBA) known as the Lake Eyre Important Bird Area, because, when flooded, it supports major breeding events of the banded stilt and Australian pelican, as well as over 1% of the world populations of red-necked avocets, sharp-tailed sandpipers, red-necked stints, silver gulls and Caspian terns.

== Geography ==
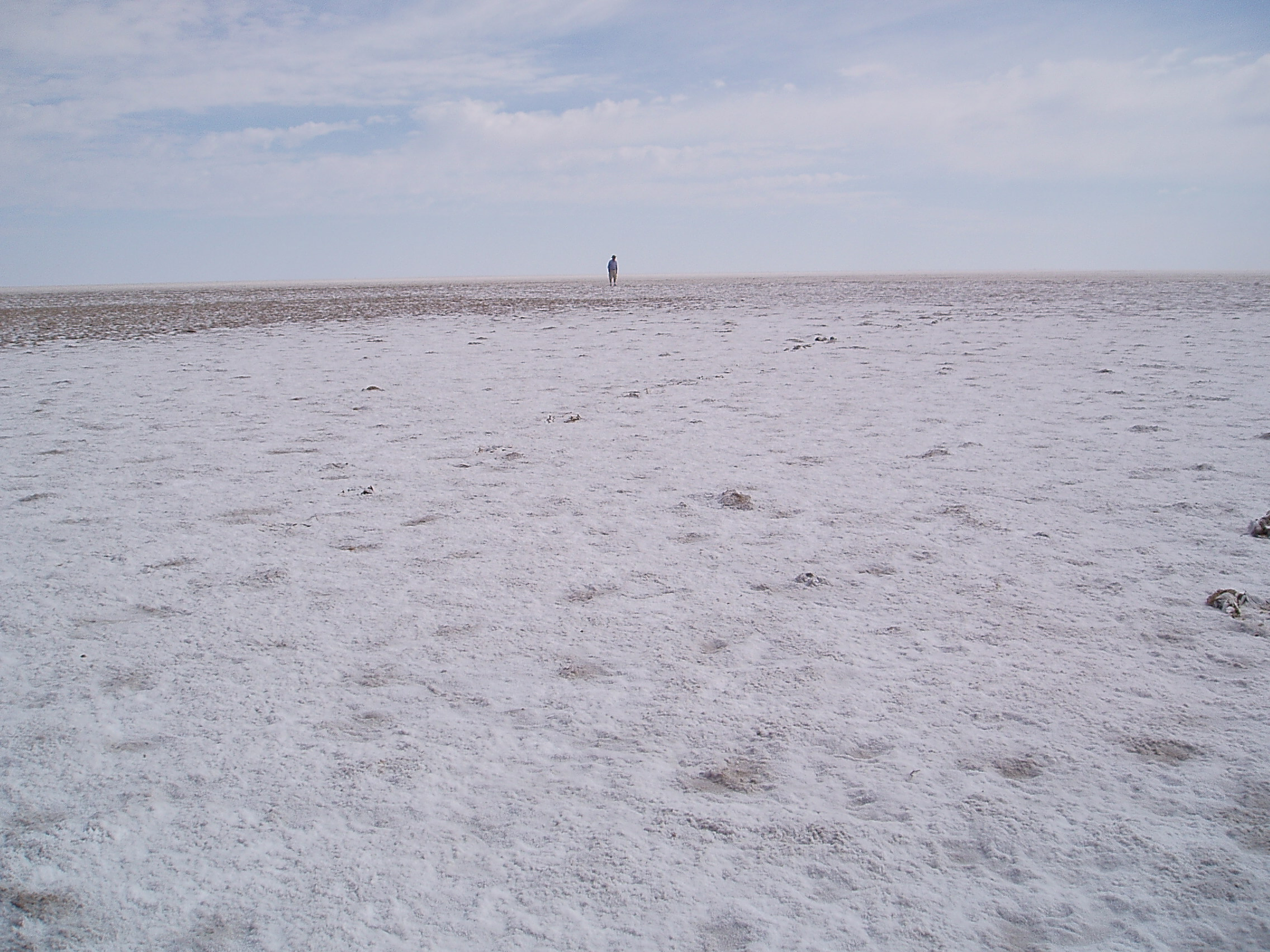
Kati Thanda–Lake Eyre salt crust

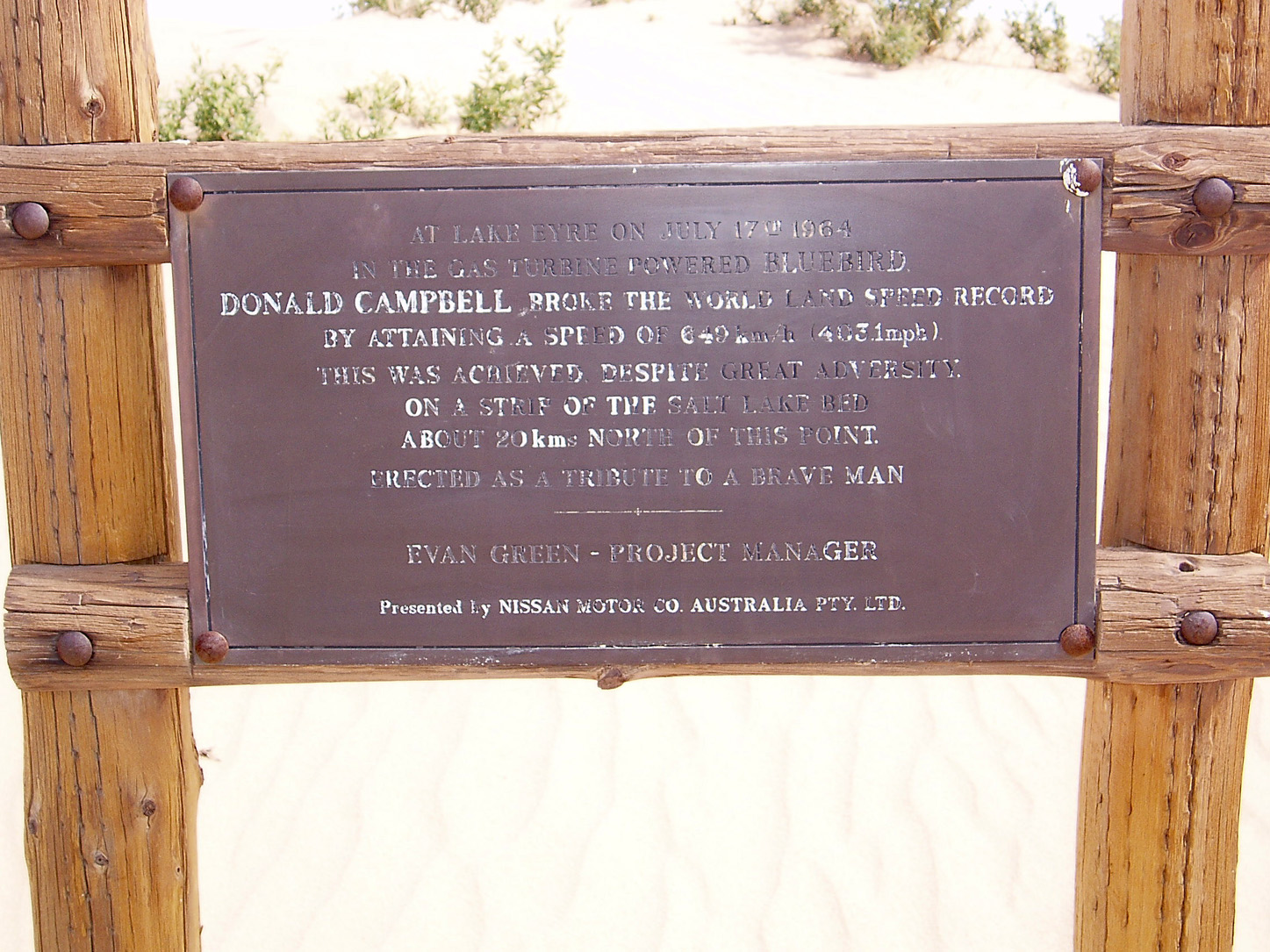
Campbell plaque at Level Post Bay

Kati Thanda–Lake Eyre is in the deserts of central Australia, in northern South Australia. It is located around 700 km (430 mi) north of Adelaide, and 400 km (250 mi) from the nearest point of the South Australian coastline. Marree is located at the northern end of The Outback Highway at the junction of the Oodnadatta and Birdsville Tracks. William Creek, the closest town to the lake, is 200 km (120 mi) away along the unsealed Oodnadatta Track, and still over 60 km (37 mi) from the edge of the lake. Halligan Bay is one of only a few public lookouts. The lake covers over 9,000 km^{2} (3,500 sq mi).

The Lake Eyre Basin is a large endorheic (internally draining) system surrounding the lakebed, the lowest part of which is filled with the characteristic salt pan caused by the seasonal expansion and subsequent evaporation of the trapped waters. Even in the dry season, there is usually some water remaining in Kati Thanda–Lake Eyre, normally collecting in over 200 smaller sub-lakes within its margins. The lake was formed by aeolian processes after tectonic upwarping occurred to the south subsequent to the end of the Pleistocene epoch. Stretching across around 15 per cent of the Australian landmass, including parts of South Australia, the Northern Territory, Queensland, and a small part of New South Wales, the Kati Thanda-Lake Eyre Basin is one of the largest endorheic systems in the world.

During the rainy season, rivers from the north-east part of the Lake Eyre Basin—in outback (south-west and central) Queensland—flow towards the lake through the Channel Country. The amount of water from the monsoon determines whether water will reach the lake and, if it does, how deep the lake will get. The average rainfall in the area of the lake is 100 to 150 millimetres (3.9 to 5.9 in) per year.

Within the lake is the lowest natural point in Australia, at approximately 15 m (49 ft) below sea level. The −15 m (−49 ft) altitude usually attributed to Kati Thanda–Lake Eyre refers to the deepest parts of the lake floor, in Belt Bay and the Madigan Gulf. The shoreline lies at −9 m (−30 ft). The lake is the area of maximum deposition of sediment in the Lake Eyre Basin.

Lake Eyre is divided into two sections which are joined by the Goyder Channel. These are known as Lake Eyre North, which is 144 kilometres (89 mi) in length and 65 kilometres (40 mi) wide, and Lake Eyre South, which measures 65 by 24 kilometres (40 by 15 mi). The salt crusts are thickest—up to 50 cm (20 in)—in the southern Belt Bay, Jackboot Bay, and Madigan Gulf sub-basins of Lake Eyre North.

== Salinity and flooding ==
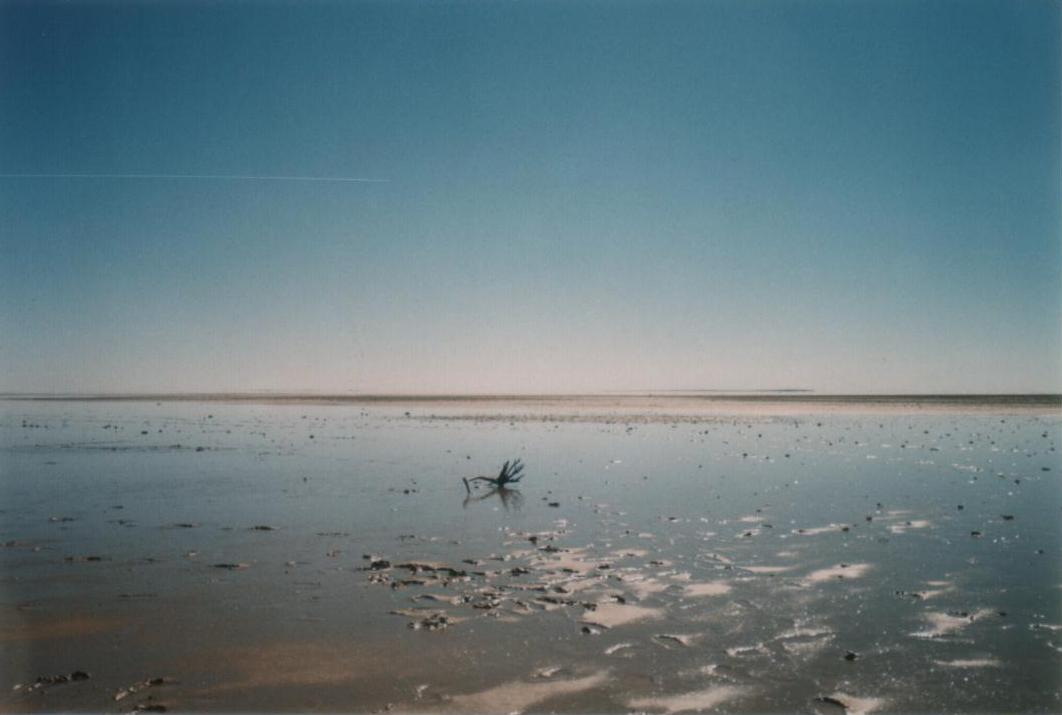
Kati Thanda–Lake Eyre south, when flooded

The salinity in the lake increases as the 450 mm (18 in) salt crust dissolves over a period of six months of a major flood, resulting in a massive fish kill. When over 4 m (13 ft) deep, the lake is no saltier than the sea, but salinity increases as the water evaporates, with saturation occurring at about a 500 mm (20 in) depth. The lake takes on a pink hue when saturated, due to the presence of beta-carotene pigment caused by the alga Dunaliella salina.

=== Flooding proposals ===
Since 1883, proposals have been made to flood Lake Eyre with seawater brought to the basin via a canal or pipeline (such as the Bradfield Scheme). The purpose was, in part, to increase evaporation and thereby increase rainfall in the region downwind of an enlarged Lake Eyre. The added rainfall has been modelled as small. Due to the basin's low elevation below sea level and the region's high annual evaporation rate (between 2,500 and 3,500 millimetres (98 and 138 in)), such schemes have generally been considered impractical, as it is likely that accumulation of salt deposits would rapidly block the engineered channel. At a rate of 1 cm (0.39 in) evaporation per day, a 3 m (9.8 ft) viaduct flowing a 0.5 m/s (1.6 ft/s) would supply enough water to create a 100 km^{2} (39 sq mi) sea. If brine water were not sent back to the ocean, it would precipitate 90,000 long tons (91,000 t) of salt every year.

=== Natural floods ===
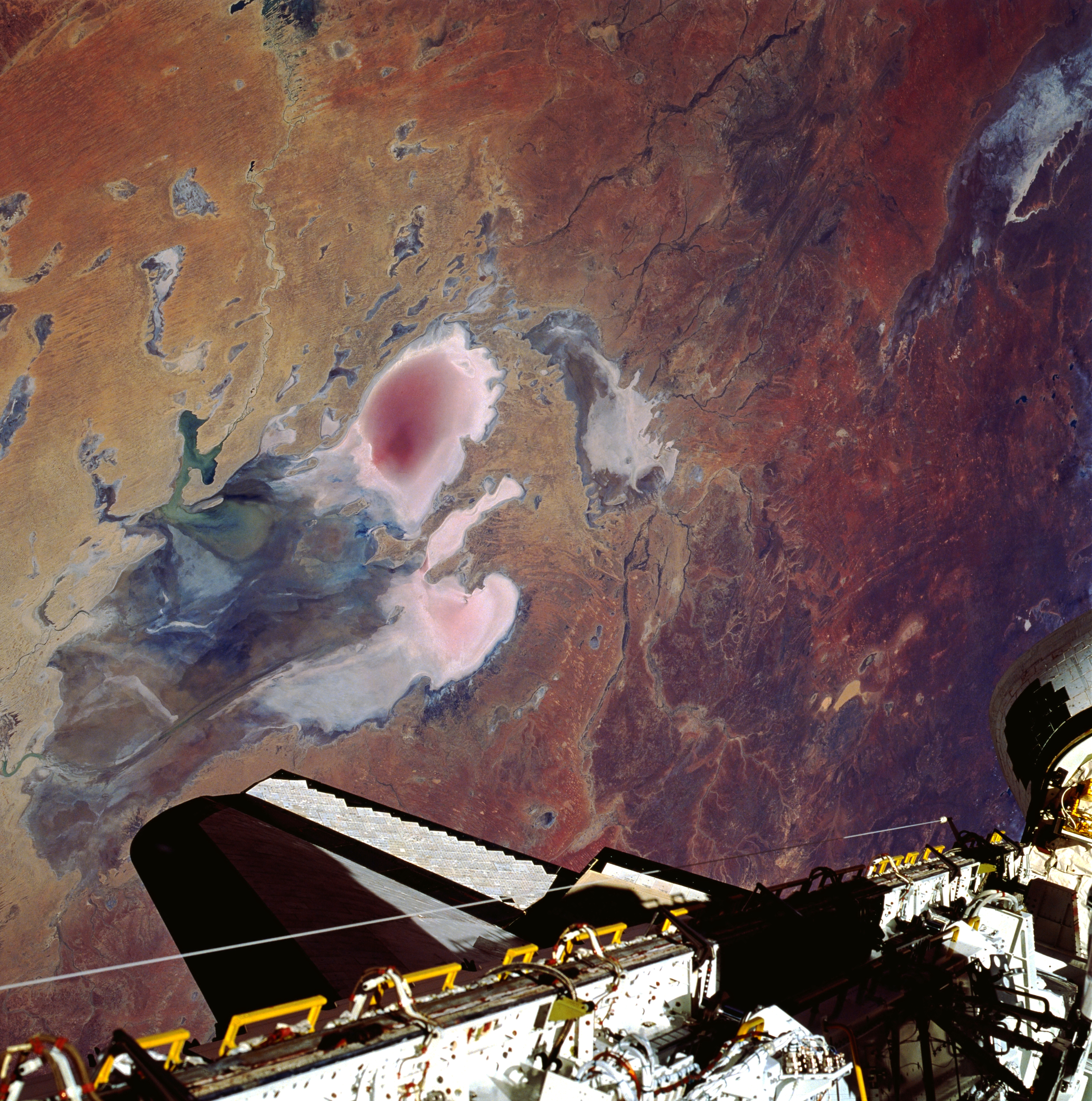
Lake Eyre in December 1990, as seen from the Space Shuttle Columbia

Typically a 1.5 m (5 ft) flood occurs every three years, a 4 m (13 ft) flood every decade, and a fill or near fill a few times a century. The water in the lake soon evaporates, with a minor or medium flood drying by the end of the following summer. Most of the water entering the lakes arrives via Warburton River. In strong La Niña years, the lake can fill. Since 1885, this has occurred in 1886–1887, 1889–1890, 1916–1917, 1950, 1955, 1974–1977, and 1999–2001, with the highest flood of 6 m (20 ft) in 1974. According to the National Parks and Wildlife Service South Australia, the lake has only been completely filled to capacity three times between 1860 and June 2025.

==== 1974 ====
In 1974, the largest recorded historical lake filling in nearly 200 years occurred. By July and August of that year, the colour was reported to be as blue as the ocean, and thousands of pelicans and seagulls arrived to feast on the fish brought into the lake by the floods.

==== 1989 ====
In 1989 the lake reached a depth of 3.6 m (12 ft).

==== 2007 ====
Torrential rain in January 2007 took about six weeks to reach the lake but only placed a small amount of water into it.

==== 2009 to 2011 ====
The 2009 Lake Eyre flood peaked at 1.5 m (5 ft) deep in late May, which is a quarter of its maximum recorded depth of 6 m (20 ft). 9 km^{3} (2 cu mi) of water crossed the Queensland–South Australian border with most of it coming from massive floods in the Georgina River. However, owing to the very low rainfall in the lower reaches of these rivers (contrasting with heavy rainfall in the upper catchments), the greater proportion soaked into the desert or evaporated en route to the lake, leaving less than 4 km^{3} (0.96 cu mi) in the lake, which covered an area of 800 km^{2} (309 sq mi), or 12% of the total. As the flood did not start filling the lake's deepest point (Belt Bay) until late March, little bird life appeared, preferring instead to nest in the upper reaches of the Lake Eyre Basin, north of Birdsville, where large lakes appeared in January as a result of monsoonal rain.

The high rainfall in summer 2010 sent flood water into the Diamantina, Georgina, and Cooper Creek catchments of the Lake Eyre basin, with the Cooper Creek reaching the lake for the first time since 1990. The higher rainfall prompted many different birds to migrate back to the area for breeding.

Heavy local rain in early March 2011 in the Stuart Creek and Warriner catchments filled Lake Eyre South, with Lake Eyre North about 75 per cent covered with water firstly from the Neales and Macumba Rivers, and later from the Warburton River.

==== 2015 to 2016 ====
In late 2015, water began flowing into Lake Eyre following heavy rain in the north-east of the state.

==== 2019 ====
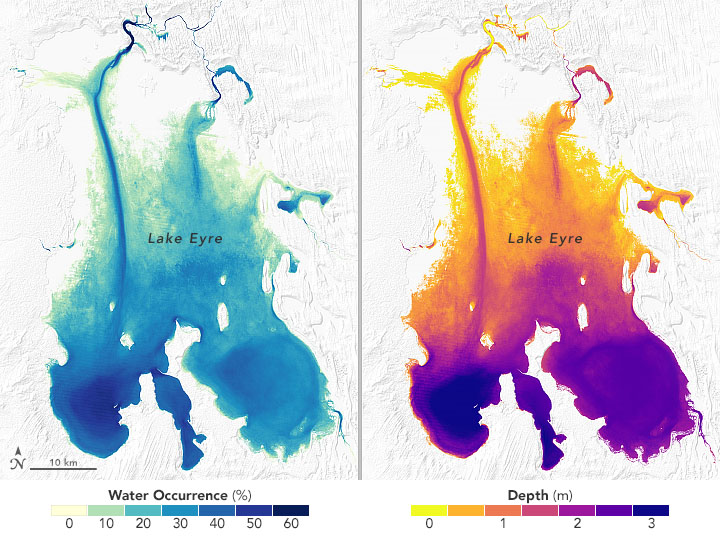
Map of the shape and depth (bathymetry) of the lake, 2020

In late March 2019, floodwaters began arriving as a result of torrential rains in northern Queensland in January. In the past, the water had taken anywhere from three to 10 months to reach the lake, but this time it arrived in two. The first flooding would be closely followed by another surge, following rains produced by Cyclone Trevor. Traditional owners and graziers agree that it is essential that the river run its course and should not be harvested during floods, as any interference in the natural systems could damage the ecosystem.

==== 2025 ====
In April 2025 it was predicted that floodwaters from Queensland in late March, combined with local rainfall pre-filling parts of the lake, would result in the lake reaching its deepest levels in 15 years some time around late May to June. Upstream river levels have been higher than in previous flood events, with Birdsville reaching 8.75 metres (28.7 ft) on Wednesday 9 April (higher than the 8.15 m in 2019), and Windorah recording flood levels approaching 1974's heights, that being Australia's wettest year on record. On 30 May 2025, the floodwaters were said to be the highest seen in Channel Country, and making their way into Kati Thanda. However, South Australia has had severe drought since 2024, and locals think that the lake is unlikely to reach the peak reached in 1974.

A new management plan for the national park was adopted in February 2025, which placed further restrictions on activities on and around the lake, already restricted under the 1985 gazetting of the lake as a national park.

== Flora and fauna ==
Phytoplankton in the lake includes Nodularia spumigena and a number of species of Dunaliella.

When recently flooded, the lake is almost fresh, and native freshwater fish, including bony bream (Nematolosa erebi), the Lake Eyre Basin sub-species of golden perch (Macquaria ambigua) and various small hardyhead species (Craterocephalus spp.) can survive in it. Macroinvertebrates and other crustaceans, form in the river systems and are brought down with the floodwaters.

=== Birds ===
The lake is one of the most important sites for waterbirds in Australia. Birds such as pelicans and banded stilts are drawn to a filled lake from southern coastal regions of Australia, and from as far afield as Papua New Guinea. During the 1989–1990 flood, it was estimated that 200,000 pelicans, 80% of Australia's total population, came to feed and roost at Lake Eyre. Scientists are presently unable to determine how such birds appear able to detect the filling of the lake, even when hundreds or thousands of kilometres away from the basin.

== Yacht club ==
The Lake Eyre Yacht Club, headquartered in Marree, comprises a dedicated group of sailors who sailed on the lake's floods in 1997, 2000, 2001, 2004, 2007 and 2009. A number of 6 m (20 ft) trailer sailers sailed on Kati Thanda–Lake Eyre in 1975, 1976, and 1984, when the flood depth reached 3–6 m (9.8–19.7 ft). In July 2010 The Yacht Club held its first regatta since 1976 and its first on Lake Killamperpunna, a freshwater lake on Cooper Creek. The Cooper had reached Kati Thanda–Lake Eyre for the first time since 1990. It is estimated that these waters reach Lake Eyre roughly 8 years in 100.

When the lake is full, a notable phenomenon is that around midday the surface can often become very flat. The surface then reflects the sky in a way that leaves both the horizon and water surface virtually impossible to see. The commodore of the Lake Eyre Yacht Club stated that sailing during this time has the appearance of sailing in the sky.

== See also ==
- Lake Torrens
- List of lakes by area
- List of lakes of Australia
- List of bodies of water by salinity
- List of prehistoric lakes
- List of places on land with elevations below sea level
- List of extreme points of Australia
- Pluvial lake
