= Birdsville Track =

Track in South Australia and Queensland, Australia

Birdsville Track South Australia–Queensland
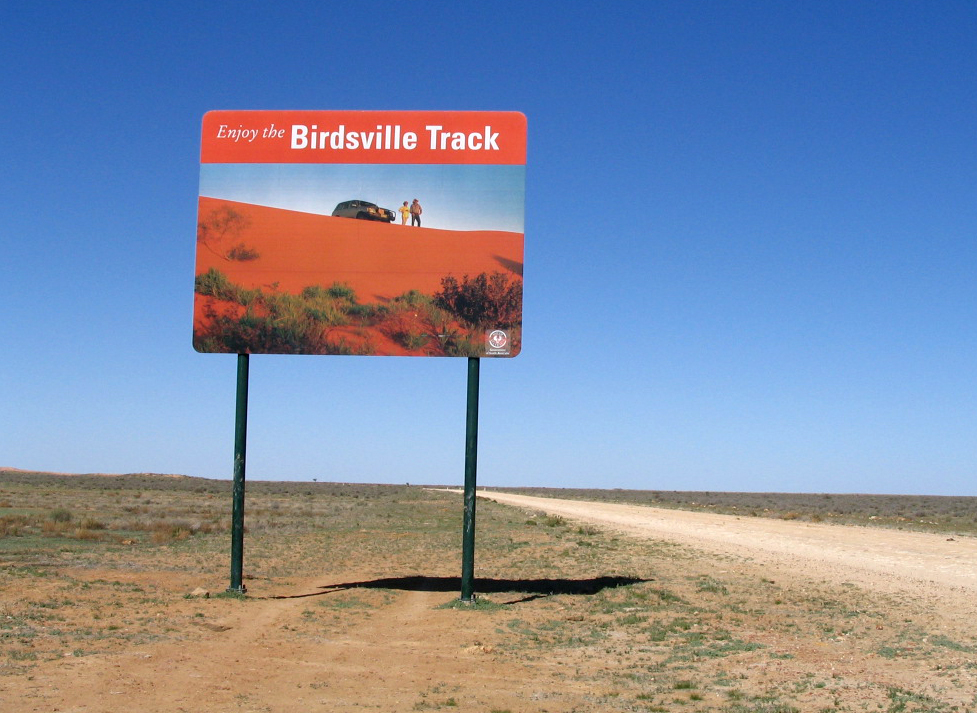
- A sign at the northern end of the Birdsville Track
- Birdsville Track route (blue and white)

General information
- Type: Track
- Length: 517 km (321 mi)

Major junctions
- North end: Eyre Developmental Road; Birdsville, Queensland
- Birdsville Developmental Road
- South end: Oodnadatta Track; The Outback Highway; Marree, South Australia

Location(s)
- Region: Far North

Restrictions
- Permits: not required
- Fuel supply: Mungeranie 28°01′7.28″S 138°39′48.02″E
- Facilities: Mungeranie 28°01′7.28″S 138°39′48.02″E

The Birdsville Track is an outback road in Australia. The 517-kilometre (321 mi) track runs between Birdsville in south-western Queensland and Marree, a small town in the north-eastern part of South Australia. It traverses three deserts along the route, the Strzelecki Desert, Sturt Stony Desert and Tirari Desert.

Originally the track was of poor quality and suitable for high-clearance four-wheel drive vehicles only, but it is now a graded dirt road and a popular tourist route. It is also used by cattle trucks carrying livestock. The track passes through one of the driest parts of Australia, with an average rainfall of less than 100 mm annually. The area is extremely barren, dry and isolated. Travellers should carry water and supplies in case of emergencies.

== History ==
The track was opened in the 1860s to walk cattle from northern Queensland and the Northern Territory to the nearest railhead in Port Augusta, which was later moved to Marree. The pioneering drover credited with establishing the track was Percy Burt. Burt set up a store at Diamantina Crossing, today known as Birdsville, and used the path to bring cattle out of the Channel Country to the railhead at Marree that was completed in 1883. This stock route was at least 1,000 km shorter than the alternative path to Brisbane.

By 1916 enough bores had been sunk into the Great Artesian Basin along the route that the movement of stock was much easier and safer than in earlier years. Bores were drilled at 40 km intervals.

An isolated store along the track operated for several decades from the Mulka Station. The Mulka Store Ruins are listed in the South Australian Heritage Register.

Over the years the Birdsville track became one of the country's most isolated and best-known stock routes, as well as a mail route made famous by outback legend Tom Kruse. Tom Kruse and the track were immortalised in The Back of Beyond, the 1954 documentary film made by John Heyer. Kruse's services ceased in 1963, replaced by an air service from Adelaide that started in 1970.

In 2006, as part of the Year of the Outback, the Australian Governor-General, Michael Jeffery, travelled along the track in a 5-day event.

The route was earmarked to be signed as part National Route 83 in the original plan of National Routes. It was to start in southern SA before travelling north through to far-north QLD. The route was never fully signed, the Birdsville Track being still largely unsealed.

During the COVID-19 pandemic, the track experienced a boost in popularity among drivers taking the route to avoid New South Wales and possible quarantine.

== Today ==
Up until the 1930s only stock and camel trains would take the Birdsville track. Today, it has become a very popular track. As a result, the track is reasonably well maintained and generally fairly smooth. However like any outback track, its condition can change, especially after rain. Large stretches of the track can still be destroyed by flash flooding and drifting sand.

In dry conditions, a shorter route at the northern end depicted on maps as the "Inside track" saves 35 kilometres in distance. Other than this, the road has no major intersections.

Fuel, supplies and facilities, including a hotel, can be found on the track at the Mungeranie station, 204 km from Marree and 313 km from Birdsville. It is linked with the Strzelecki Track via the Walkers Crossing Track, which is closed in summer and only traversable in dry weather.

== Major junctions ==
State	LGA	Location	km	mi	Destinations	Notes
Queensland	Diamantina	Birdsville	0	0.0	Eyre Developmental Road (National Route 83) – Bedourie, Boulia, Mount Isa	Northern terminus of track
Queensland	Diamantina	Birdsville	4	2.5	Birdsville Developmental Road – Windorah, Quilpie, Charleville	
State border			13	8.1	Queensland – South Australia border	
South Australia	Outback Communities Authority	Mungeranie	314	195	Mungeranie Roadhouse	
South Australia	Outback Communities Authority	Marree	517	321	Oodnadatta Track (north) – William Creek, Oodnadatta; The Outback Highway (south) – Lyndhurst, Hawker	Southern terminus of track
Route transition

== In popular culture ==
The miniseries Alice to Nowhere and the book by Evan Green on which it is based, are largely set on the Birdsville Track. The show heavily features a mail truck which may have been based on the Leyland Badger driven by Tom Kruse.

== See also ==
- Highways in Australia
- List of highways in Queensland
- List of highways in South Australia
