= Marree, South Australia =

Marree
- Town
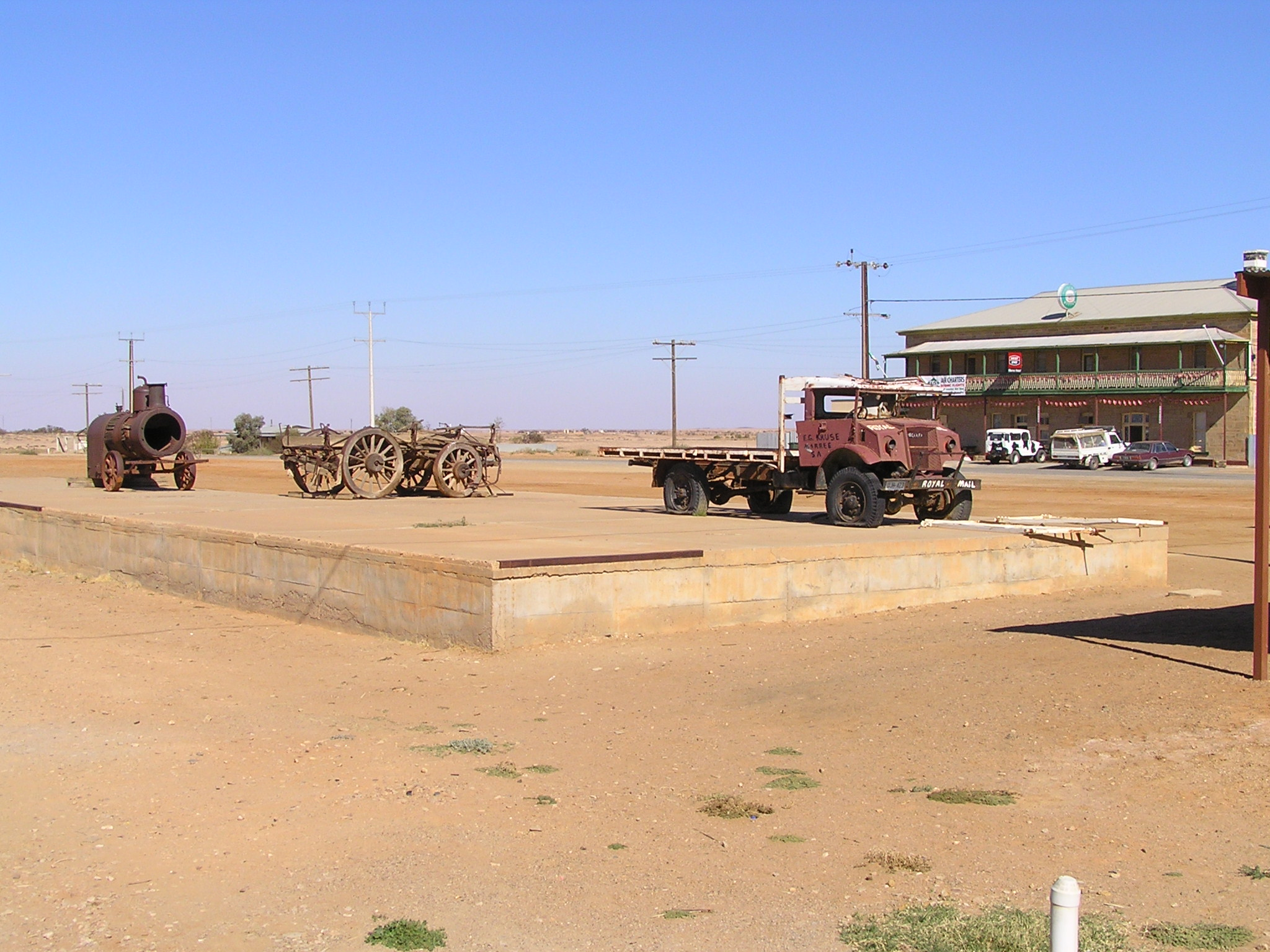
- Marree Hotel and Tom Kruse's 4×4 truck

- Coordinates: 29°38′57″S 138°03′49″E
- Country: Australia
- State: South Australia
- Region: Far North
- LGA: Pastoral Unincorporated Area
- Location: 589 km (366 mi) north of Adelaide; 519 km (322 mi) south of Birdsville; 345 km (214 mi) south-east of Oodnadatta
- Established: 20 December 1883 (town); 29 May 1997 (locality)

Government
  - State electorate: Stuart
  - Federal division: Grey
- Elevation airport: 50 m (160 ft)

Population
  - Total: 65 (SAL 2021)
- Time zone: UTC+9:30 (ACST)
  - Summer (DST): UTC+10:30 (ACST)
- Postcode: 5733
- Mean max temp: 29.2 °C (84.6 °F)
- Mean min temp: 14.0 °C (57.2 °F)
- Annual rainfall: 144.7 mm (5.70 in)
Localities around Marree
Callanna	Marree Station	Marree Station
Callanna	Marree	Marree Station
Callanna	Callanna; Marree Station	Callanna
- Locations; Adjoining localities

Marree (/mɑːˈriː/ mah-REE, formerly Hergott Springs) is a small town located in the north of South Australia. It is located 589 kilometres (366 mi) north of Adelaide at the junction of the Oodnadatta Track and the Birdsville Track, 49 metres (161 ft) above sea level. Marree is an important service centre for the large sheep and cattle stations in north-east South Australia as well as a stopover destination for tourists travelling along the Birdsville or Oodnadatta Tracks.

The area is the home of the Dieri Aboriginal people. The major areas of employment are mining, agriculture and accommodation services.

The town was home to Australia's first mosque, which was made of mud brick and built by the Afghan cameleers employed at Marree's inception. At the turn of the 20th century the town was divided in two, with Europeans on one side and Afghans and Aboriginals on the other.

== History and etymology ==
The first European to explore the area was Edward John Eyre, who passed through in 1840. In 1859, explorer John McDouall Stuart visited the area together with the German botanist and accomplished bushman Joseph Herrgott, who discovered the springs which Stuart named after him. Herrgott had previously taken part of B. H. Babbage's expedition to Lake Torrens. He died two years afterwards in 1861; he was 36 years old.

Initially the area was known as Herrgott (or Hergott) Springs, with the town's post office given the name Hergott Springs after surveying of the town in 1883. The town was also recognised as Hergott Springs in the 1911 census. In that year the District Trained Nursing Society sent Clara Winifred Howie to establish a nursing facility in Hergott Springs.

The town's name was changed to Marree in 1917 due to anti-German sentiment during World War I.

Marree Hotel and Marree Fettlers' Cottages are listed on the South Australian Heritage Register.

The movie The Rover, starring Guy Pearce and Robert Pattinson, was filmed in Marree in January 2013. Parts of The Inbetweeners 2, a 2014 British comedy film set in Australia, were filmed in Marree. Scenes from Last Cab to Darwin, starring Michael Caton, were filmed in Marree in May 2014. Jan Palo, a local identity, had a non-speaking part filmed in his home, the old butcher's shop.

== Early transportation and telegraphy ==
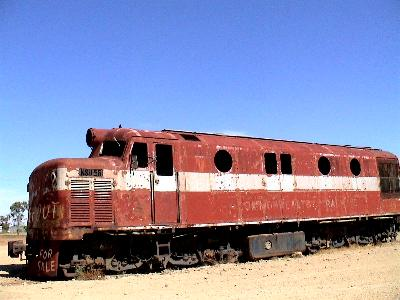
Former Commonwealth Railways NSU-class locomotive at Marree railway station

The Central Australia Railway reached the town in 1883 and the first train ran to the railway station in January 1884. The South Australia Post and Telegraph Department established a telegraph and post office in Maree in June 1884.

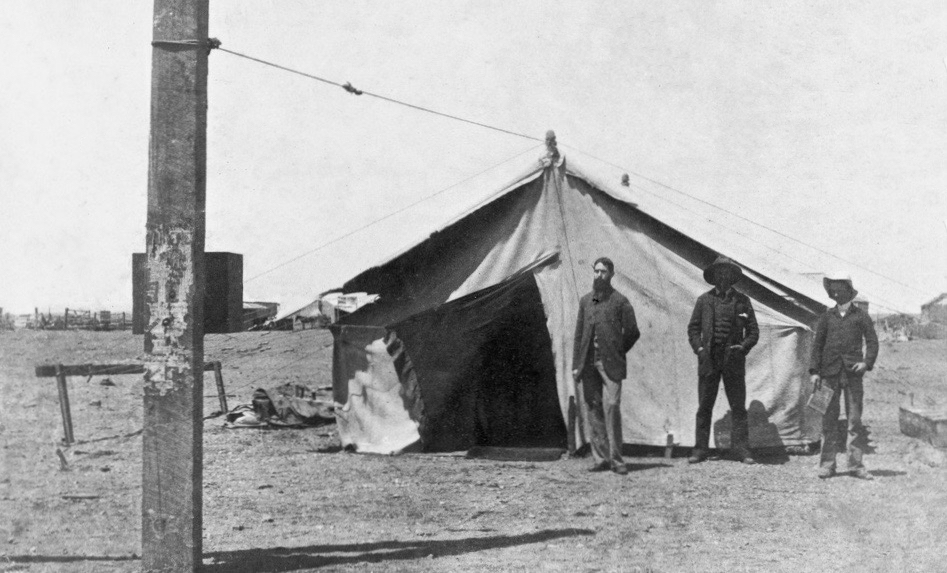
Maree Post Office and Telegraph Station, 1884. Charles Arthur O'Brien, on left

It operated in a canvas tent, until a more permanent structure was built. The first station master was James Arthur O'Brien (born 1863) who held the post from 1884 to 1901.

The town became a major railhead for the cattle industry. The railway was extended north from the town in stages, reaching Alice Springs in 1929. It was on the route of the passenger train which became known as The Ghan. In 1957, a standard-gauge line was built south from Marree on a flatter alignment to facilitate the movement of coal from the Leigh Creek Coalfield to Port Augusta. That made Marree a break of gauge on The Ghan service because the remainder of the line was still narrow gauge. In 1980 the narrow gauge line from Marree to Alice Springs closed when the Adelaide–Alice Springs line was rebuilt much further west. In 1987 the standard gauge line to Marree was closed north of the coal mine and the town lost its railway connection completely.

Marree was also the home of Tom Kruse, one of the men who drove the mail trucks from Marree to Birdsville in Queensland, a distance of some 700 kilometres. This route crosses some of the most challenging sandy and stony desert country in Australia, and it was a remarkable feat for fully loaded trucks to make the run at all. A collection of hundreds of photographs, documents and memorabilia from Kruse's Birdsville mail run are on display at the Marree Hotel.

== Marree Man ==
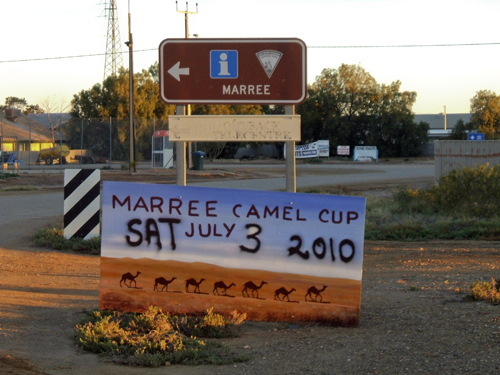
Marree's Camel Cup

The name "Marree" was referred to briefly around the world when in 1998, a chalk figure recently etched into the landscape 60 km west of Marree was discovered, dubbed the "Marree Man". Calls were made to turn it into a state icon but the unimpressed local population preferred to let it fade naturally back into the landscape.

== Governance ==
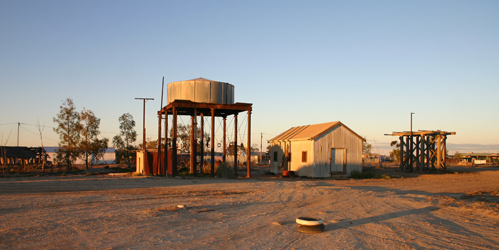
Derelict infrastructure of the former Central Australia Railway in 2010

Marree is located within the federal Division of Grey, the state electoral district of Stuart, the Pastoral Unincorporated Area of South Australia and the state's Far North region. In the absence of a local government authority, the community in Marree receives municipal services from a state government agency, the Outback Communities Authority.

== Demographics ==
As of the 2021 census, the population of Marree was 65, with 12 families and 85 private dwellings. The town reported a higher male population than average, with 55.0% of residents being male and 45.0% being female. The median age was 52, well above average. The median weekly household income was $485, which is well below average even by regional standards.

The ancestral makeup of Marree is a mixture of European and Indigenous residents alongside some descendants of Afghan cameleers. In 2021, there were six reported ancestries: English (36.9%), Aboriginal (33.8%), Australian (16.9%), Irish (9.2%), Afghan (6.2%) and Scottish (4.6%). While the census reported four people (6.2% of Marree's population) claiming Afghan ancestry, community estimates claim that up to 10 residents (15.3% of the town's population) are descended from Afghan cameleers.

Due to its isolation and very small population, Marree lacks any substantial modern immigration. 73.8% of the town's residents reported being born in Australia, while 6.2% reported being born in England. Reflecting the presence of families with multi-generational lineage in Australia, 70.8% had Australian-born mothers and 64.6% had Australian-born fathers, while 7.7% had English-born mothers and 4.6% had English-born fathers. English is the only first language spoken in the town.

The majority of Marree is irreligious, with 53.8% of the town's residents reporting having "no religion", making the town less religious than the South Australian state and Australian national averages. A town without any active churches, a below-average total of 23.1% of the population reported being Christian, with 7.7% being non-denominational, 6.2% belonging to the Uniting Church in Australia (UCA) and 4.6% each being Anglican and Catholic. Despite the town's Afghan history and the former presence of two mosques, including the historic Marree Mosque (the first mosque to have ever been built in Australia), there are no Muslims living in the town today.

== Climate ==
Like much of inland Australia, Marree experiences a subtropical desert climate (Köppen: BWh); with very hot summers and mild winters; as evidenced by its position in the Tirari Desert. Temperatures above 40.0 °C (104.0 °F) have been recorded in every month from October to April. Marree is one of the driest Australian settlements, only receiving around 144.7 mm (5.70 in) of highly erratic rainfall. Precipitation falls on around 33.4 days annually, and is extremely erratic year-round.

Climate data for Marree Aero (29.66°S 138.07°E, 50 m (160 ft) m AMSL) (1998-2025 data)
Month	Jan	Feb	Mar	Apr	May	Jun	Jul	Aug	Sep	Oct	Nov	Dec	Year
Record high °C (°F)	49.8 (121.6)	47.3 (117.1)	45.9 (114.6)	39.7 (103.5)	32.6 (90.7)	30.0 (86.0)	29.8 (85.6)	37.3 (99.1)	39.3 (102.7)	42.2 (108.0)	47.5 (117.5)	48.0 (118.4)	49.8 (121.6)
Mean daily maximum °C (°F)	38.9 (102.0)	37.2 (99.0)	34.0 (93.2)	28.9 (84.0)	23.2 (73.8)	19.4 (66.9)	19.5 (67.1)	22.1 (71.8)	26.6 (79.9)	30.2 (86.4)	33.6 (92.5)	36.3 (97.3)	29.2 (84.5)
Mean daily minimum °C (°F)	23.1 (73.6)	22.0 (71.6)	19.1 (66.4)	14.2 (57.6)	9.1 (48.4)	5.7 (42.3)	5.0 (41.0)	6.7 (44.1)	10.6 (51.1)	14.2 (57.6)	17.8 (64.0)	20.6 (69.1)	14.0 (57.2)
Record low °C (°F)	13.0 (55.4)	12.7 (54.9)	8.7 (47.7)	5.0 (41.0)	1.3 (34.3)	−2.4 (27.7)	−1.2 (29.8)	−1.6 (29.1)	2.7 (36.9)	5.2 (41.4)	7.9 (46.2)	11.0 (51.8)	−2.4 (27.7)
Average precipitation mm (inches)	18.4 (0.72)	22.5 (0.89)	12.0 (0.47)	9.4 (0.37)	7.5 (0.30)	11.5 (0.45)	4.7 (0.19)	6.5 (0.26)	10.7 (0.42)	12.1 (0.48)	15.0 (0.59)	14.1 (0.56)	144.7 (5.70)
Average precipitation days (≥ 0.2 mm)	2.7	2.5	2.0	2.1	2.5	3.2	2.5	2.7	2.6	3.1	4.1	3.4	33.4
Average afternoon relative humidity (%)	16	22	21	24	32	39	37	30	23	19	20	19	25
Average dew point °C (°F)	5.2 (41.4)	7.4 (45.3)	5.3 (41.5)	4.5 (40.1)	4.3 (39.7)	4.0 (39.2)	2.8 (37.0)	1.5 (34.7)	1.2 (34.2)	0.6 (33.1)	3.1 (37.6)	4.0 (39.2)	3.7 (38.6)
Source: Bureau of Meteorology (humidity 1991-2010 normals)

The original weather station collected data from 1885 to 2015, and is still open. Measurements are now taken from the airport 1.6 km (0.99 mi) away.

Climate data for Marree (29.65°S 138.06°E, 49 m (161 ft) AMSL) (1885-2015 data)
Month	Jan	Feb	Mar	Apr	May	Jun	Jul	Aug	Sep	Oct	Nov	Dec	Year
Record high °C (°F)	49.4 (120.9)	47.9 (118.2)	46.1 (115.0)	40.1 (104.2)	34.0 (93.2)	30.1 (86.2)	29.6 (85.3)	35.0 (95.0)	39.5 (103.1)	43.7 (110.7)	47.4 (117.3)	49.0 (120.2)	49.4 (120.9)
Mean daily maximum °C (°F)	38.0 (100.4)	36.8 (98.2)	33.9 (93.0)	28.5 (83.3)	23.2 (73.8)	19.6 (67.3)	19.1 (66.4)	21.5 (70.7)	25.8 (78.4)	29.5 (85.1)	33.3 (91.9)	36.1 (97.0)	28.8 (83.8)
Mean daily minimum °C (°F)	21.4 (70.5)	21.1 (70.0)	18.0 (64.4)	13.3 (55.9)	9.0 (48.2)	6.0 (42.8)	5.0 (41.0)	6.4 (43.5)	9.8 (49.6)	13.4 (56.1)	16.9 (62.4)	19.6 (67.3)	13.3 (56.0)
Record low °C (°F)	10.0 (50.0)	10.6 (51.1)	7.8 (46.0)	2.8 (37.0)	0.0 (32.0)	−2.8 (27.0)	−2.8 (27.0)	−1.4 (29.5)	−1.1 (30.0)	1.0 (33.8)	7.2 (45.0)	10.2 (50.4)	−2.8 (27.0)
Average precipitation mm (inches)	17.3 (0.68)	21.5 (0.85)	14.3 (0.56)	11.0 (0.43)	13.3 (0.52)	13.6 (0.54)	9.9 (0.39)	9.1 (0.36)	10.6 (0.42)	12.9 (0.51)	11.8 (0.46)	16.4 (0.65)	161.7 (6.37)
Average precipitation days (≥ 0.2 mm)	2.3	2.2	1.9	1.9	2.5	3.0	2.6	2.5	2.4	2.8	2.7	2.5	33.4
Average afternoon relative humidity (%)	21	26	25	31	39	44	41	34	29	25	23	21	30
Average dew point °C (°F)	8.6 (47.5)	10.4 (50.7)	8.6 (47.5)	7.4 (45.3)	6.7 (44.1)	5.7 (42.3)	4.0 (39.2)	3.1 (37.6)	3.8 (38.8)	4.5 (40.1)	5.7 (42.3)	7.3 (45.1)	6.3 (43.4)
Source: Bureau of Meteorology (1885-2015 data)
