= Oodnadatta Track =

Outback road in South Australia

Oodnadatta Track South Australia
- The Oodnadatta Track (depicted in blue)
- Coordinates: 27.307941°S 133.625212°E (Northwest end); 29.651424°S 138.071497°E (Southeast end)

General information
- Type: Track
- Length: 614 km (382 mi)

Major junctions
- Northwest end: Stuart Highway; Marla, South Australia
- Birdsville Track
- Southeast end: The Outback Highway; Marree, South Australia

Location(s)
- Region: Far North

Restrictions
- Permits: not required
- Fuel supply: Oodnadatta 27.548684°S 135.448297°E; William Creek 28.906615°S 136.338789°E; Marree 29.645566°S 138.063621°E
- Facilities: Airstrips, charters at all towns, UHF Radio repeaters with 100 km range on various channels provide emergency contact with locals. Swimming pools and police stations at Oodnadatta and Marla

The Oodnadatta Track is an unsealed 614 km (382 mi) outback road in the Australian state of South Australia, connecting Marla in the north-west via Oodnadatta to Marree in the south-east. Along the way, the track passes the settlements of Oodnadatta and William Creek, the southern lake of the Kati Thanda-Lake Eyre National Park, and mound springs known as Freeling Springs, Strangways Springs, and The Bubbler and Blanche Cup (Wabma Kadarbu Mound Springs).

Some maps show Oodnadatta Track as route D95, which, under the extended Australian alphanumeric road numbering system, belongs to a D road, a category distinct from a C road. However, the D95 is not signposted, as the Department for Infrastructure and Transport has a policy of not marking unsealed roads.

== History ==
The track follows a traditional Australian Aboriginal trading route. Along the track are numerous springs feeding water from the Great Artesian Basin, the most accessible examples being the mound springs near Coward Springs, now in the Wabma Kadarbu Mound Springs Conservation Park. Later, because of the availability of water, the route was chosen for the steam-train powered Central Australia Railway, the original route of The Ghan.

It was also the route taken by the explorer John McDouall Stuart on his third expedition in 1859. Remnants of the many railway sidings and bridges, the ruins of railway buildings, and Overland Telegraph Line repeater stations are located along the track – some of the best preserved are at the Coward Springs Campground – complete with a natural artesian spa and the abandoned Curdimurka railway siding.

Angle Pole (27°30′13″S 135°24′57″E) is the point near Oodnadatta where the direction of the telegraph line changed to a more northerly direction. It is near the Peake cattle station, also known as "The Peake", or Freeling Springs. The ruins of Peake telegraph station exist on the station today. Nearby Peake Creek was named after Edward John Peake by John McDouall Stuart in June 1859, hence Peake Station, which was acquired by Kidman Holdings in 1898.

The track was named by Adam Plate of the Oodnadatta Progress Association in about 1980, to form a trilogy of unsealed tourist routes with the Birdsville and Strzelecki Tracks nearby. This road has no major intersections.

== Route ==
The Oodnadatta Track heads southeast from Marla to Oodnadatta, and then roughly follows the former Central Australia Railway further southeast, until meeting The Outback Highway (which is sealed) at Marree. The road's surface has been well maintained in recent years.

In dry weather, the track is passable to most vehicles and caravans. A four-wheel drive (4x4) vehicle gives a more comfortable journey, and is essential for driving the track during and after rain. Since the track is unsealed, the Government of South Australia recommends that users check whether it is open before departure.

== Major junctions ==
Oodanadatta Track is entirely contained within the Outback Communities Authority local government area.

Location	km	mi	Destinations	Notes
Marla	0	0.0	Stuart Highway (A87) – Port Augusta, Coober Pedy, Alice Springs	Northwestern terminus of track
Oodnadatta	214	133	Kempe Road – Coober Pedy	
Callanna	546	339	Borefield Road – Olympic Dam, Roxby Downs	
Marree	614	382	Birdsville Track – Birdsville	
Marree	614	382	The Outback Highway – Lyndhurst, Hawker	Southeastern terminus of track
Route transition

== Gallery ==
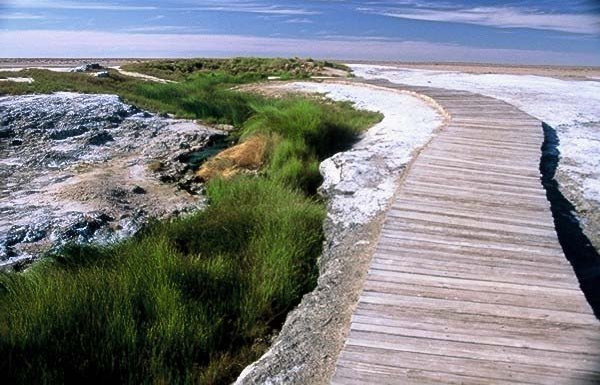
Mound Springs on the Oodnadatta Track

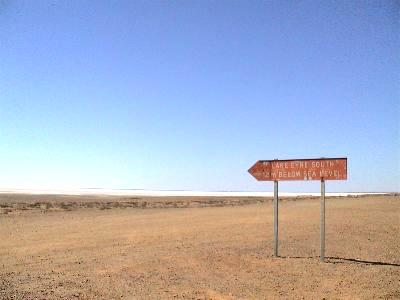
Lake Eyre South from the Oodnadatta Track

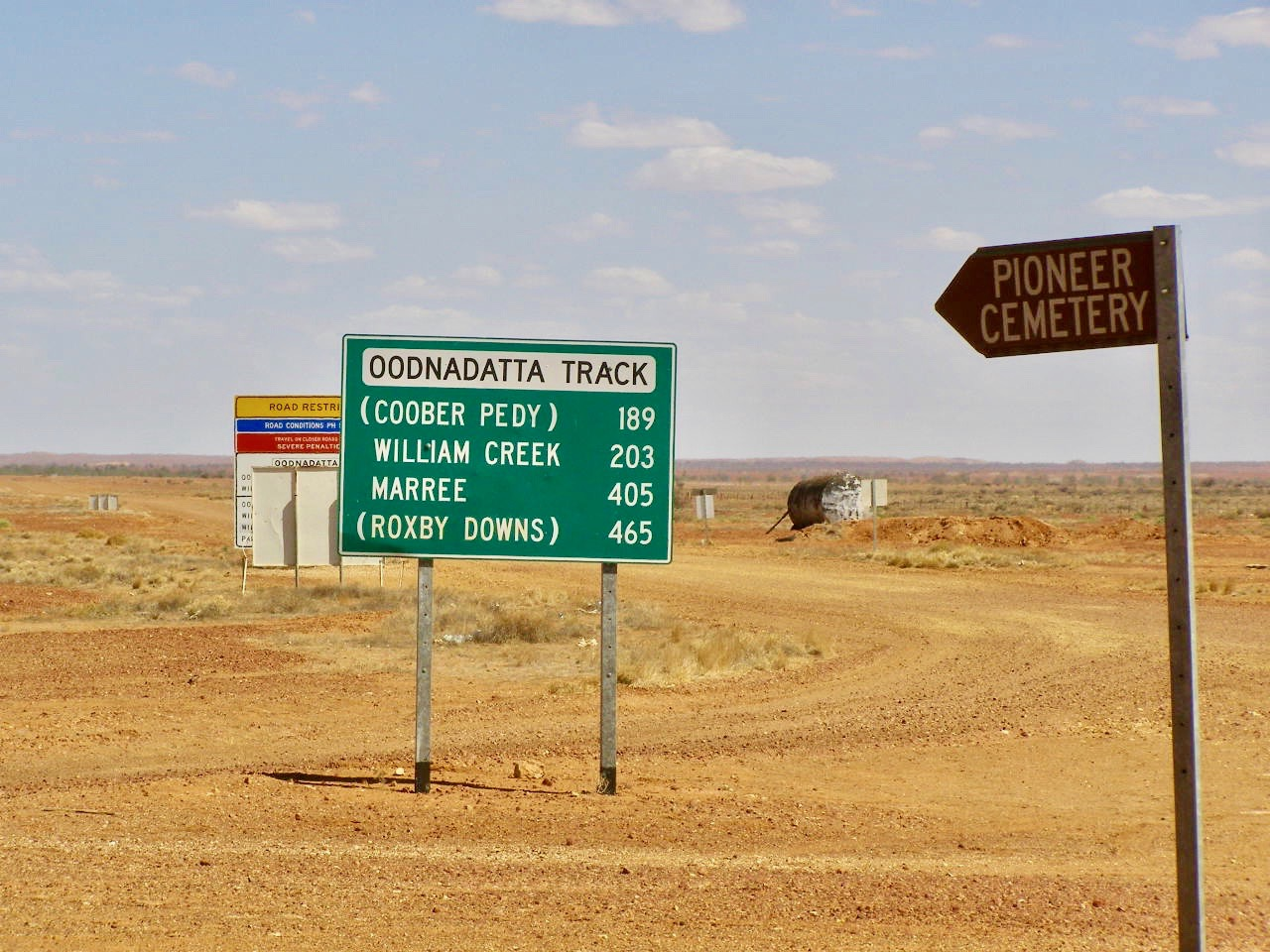
Road signs at Oodnadatta

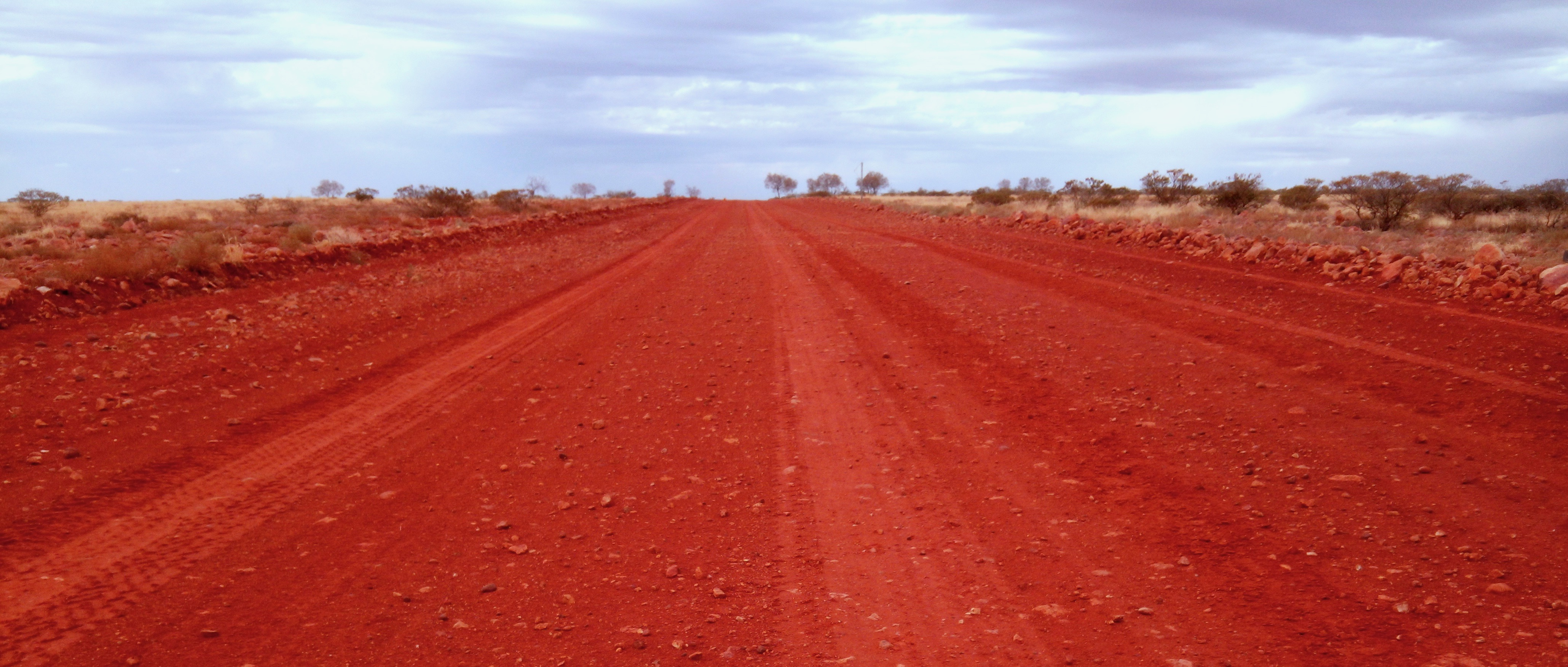
The Oodnadatta Track heading north from Oodnadatta

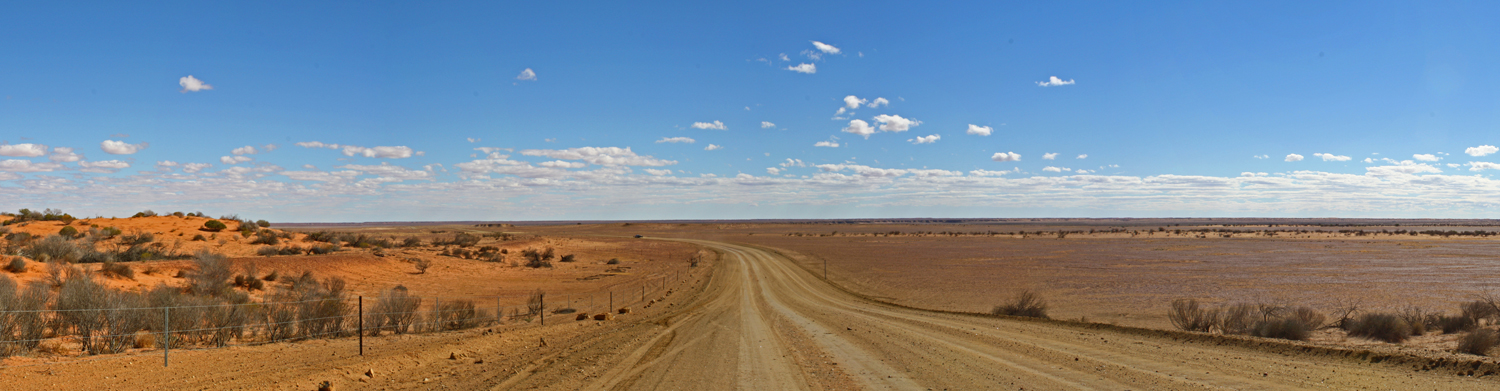
The Oodnadatta Track from a slight rise in the road

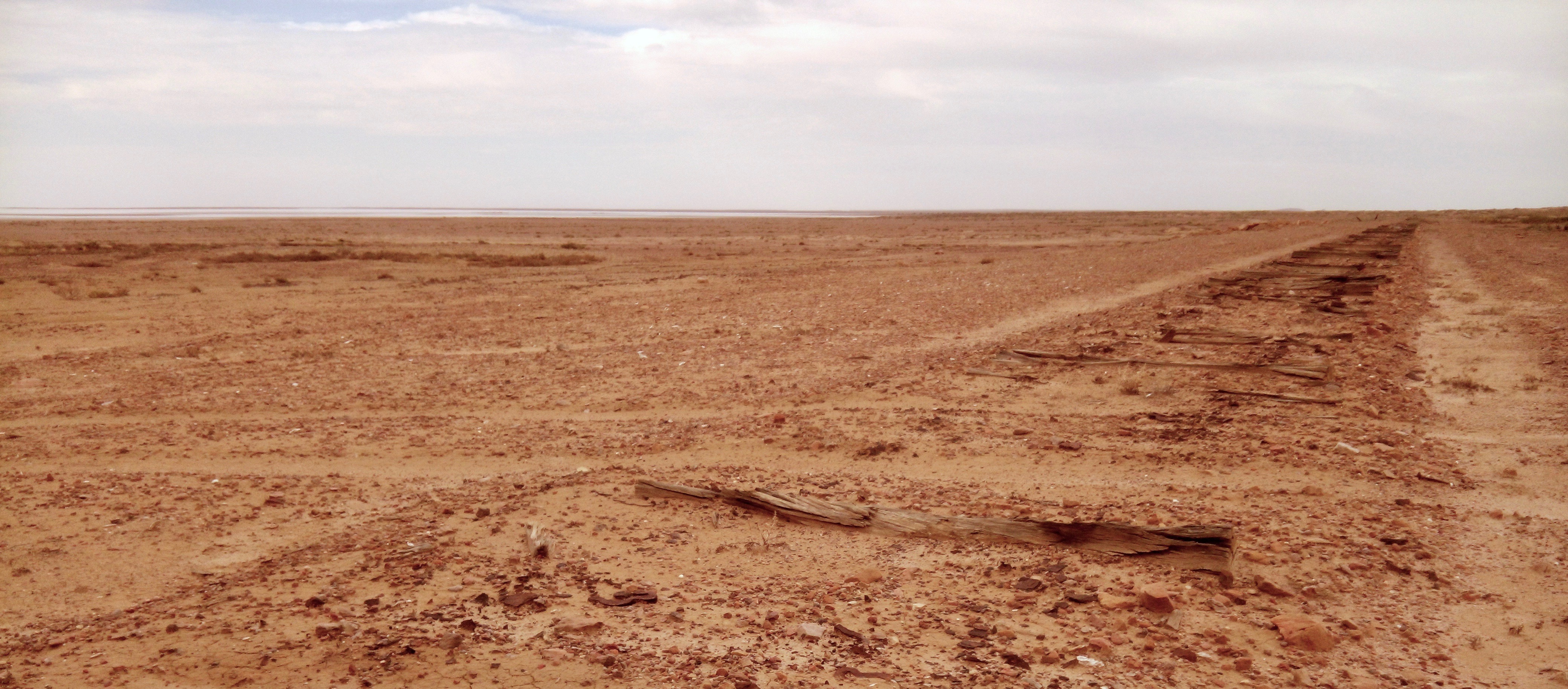
Trackbed of the former Central Australia Railway – the "old Ghan" line – near Lake Eyre South (left distance)

== See also ==
- Highways in Australia
- List of highways in South Australia
