= Anna Creek =

Anna Creek may refer to:

- Anna Creek Station, a homestead in Australia
- Anna Creek (Montana), a stream in Montana
