= John Warren (Australian politician) =

Member of the South Australian Legislative Council for the North-Eastern District
- In office 1888–1912

Personal details
- Born: 3 September 1830 Coxton Farm, Elgin, Scotland
- Died: 13 September 1914 (aged 84)
- Occupation: Pastoralist, suffragist

John Warren (3 September 1830 – 13 September 1914) was an Australian pastoralist and politician. He was a member of the South Australian Legislative Council from 1888 to 1912, representing North-Eastern District.

== Biography ==
Warren was born the son of John Warren Snr at Coxton Farm, near Elgin, Morayshire, Scotland. His father emigrated to South Australia in 1838, perhaps on the same boat as his friend Thomas Hogarth. The son followed four years later and joined his parents at Mount Crawford. Warren joined Hogarth in developing a pastoral lease at Strangways Springs until the death of Hogarth, then around 1882 another lease near the Australian Overland Telegraph Line with Hogarth's sons.

In 1852 he went to the Victorian gold fields for a brief period. On his return to South Australia he became chairman of Mt Crawford District Council.

Warren married Margaret Hogarth on 11 December 1863, six months after the death of his mother, Lydia Campbell Warren (ca.1785 – 1 June 1863). They had 12 children, including:

- John Campbell Warren, who married Lillie May Dale on 4 August 1892
- Alexander Blair Warren (18 May 1868 – 17 January 1909) married Isabella Gertrude Andrews on 20 August 1907. Isabella was a daughter of Walter Boyd Tate Andrews (1823-1899)
- Elliot D. C. Warren, who married Marjory Dale Hood on 27 April 1910
- Francis Dunbar Warren (his youngest son), who co-owned a pastoral station called Finniss Springs. Francis married Arabana woman Laura Paralta, with whom he had seven children, and around 100 Aboriginal people camped on his land. In 1939 the United Aborigines Mission established a church, school, and other facilities alongside to the station, where Aboriginal families could live together, find employment on the station, and where the children were taught in both traditional and European ways.

Warren's sister Jane married William Bakewell on 20 April 1844.

Warren was an enthusiastic member of the voluntary militia, which he joined in 1861. He was presented with the Imperial long service medal and was captain of the Williamstown Company until it was disbanded, when he was appointed acting captain attached to the Gawler Mounted Infantry. He was an expert marksman and almost never missed a parade, but was never promoted. Warren was also a prominent member of the Church of England.

Warren took an active interest in the development of the Northern Territory, and as early as 1862 was largely interested in a sheep station on the route of the transcontinental telegraph line, which station he carried on in partnership with his brothers-in-law (the Messrs. Hogarth).

== Politics ==
In 1884 he contested the Assembly seat of Barossa, but was unsuccessful. In 1888 he sat for the Legislative Council for the North-Eastern district as a colleague of Henry Ayers and was successful. He was reelected at the end of his term in 1896 and continued to represent his district until 1912, when he quit politics. He was by then almost totally blind, having injured his eyes in an explosion.

Warren was supportive of women's right to vote and felt that women of property should be allowed to vote. In 1891 he introduced a Bill to grant universal suffrage for South Australian women but it did not pass. Similar legislation was successful three years later.

== Recognition ==
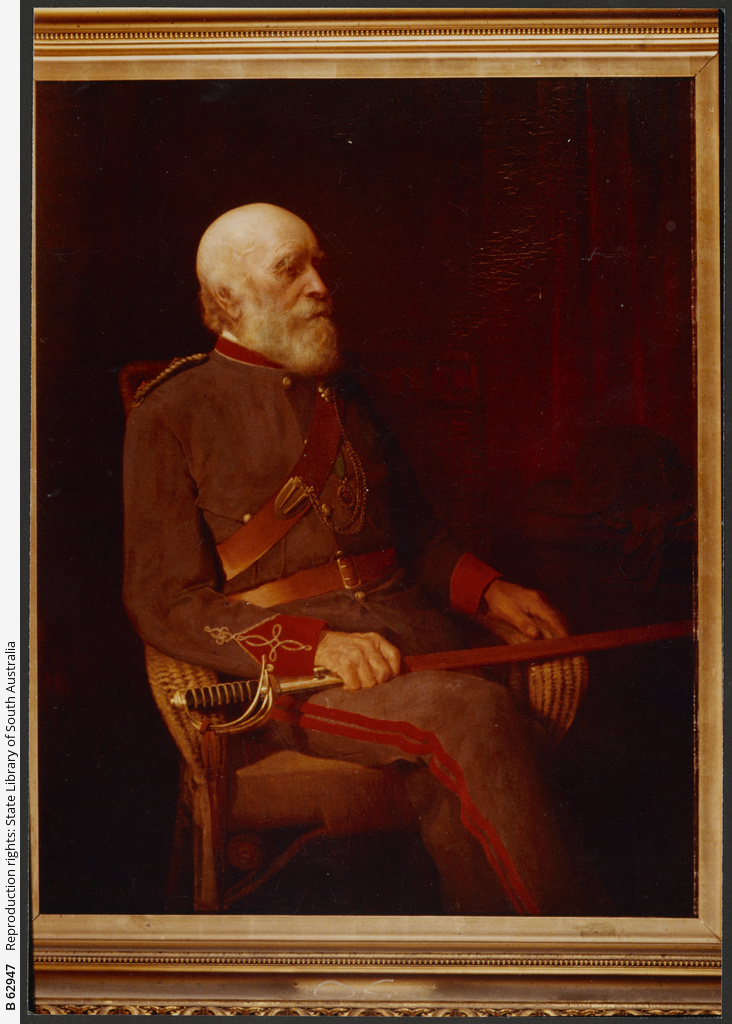
John Warren of Springfield, Williamstown. State Library of South Australia B-62947

On 4 November 1912, after his retirement from the Legislative Council, he was presented with an oil painting of himself done by G. A. J. Webb. That painting is now held by the Art Gallery of South Australia.

The Warren Reservoir, a water storage facility near Mount Crawford, and the Hundred of Warren on the Eyre Peninsula were named for him.
