= Thomas Hogarth (politician) =

Australian politician

Thomas Hogarth (8 September 1815 – 1 September 1893) was a politician in the early days of the Colony of South Australia.

== History ==
Thomas Hogarth was born in Dalry, Ayrshire, Scotland, and emigrated with his brother John to South Australia on the Delhi, arriving in December 1838. He was for a time farming at the Black Forest with William Bowman and with Robert Patterson. He worked at roadmaking and flour-milling, then the manufacture of agricultural implements (and much later was involved with John Ridley in improvements to his reaper). His brother John died a few months after arriving in Australia.

He ran Strangways Springs station with his son-in-law John Warren MLC, then around 1850 began farming on the Gawler Plains, near Smithfield, South Australia.

He was elected to the Legislative Council in 1866 and was reelected when his term elapsed in 1873, finally retiring in 1885 when his second 12-year term expired.

He was a prominent supporter of the Gawler Agricultural Society and the Royal Agricultural Society and was appointed to the Diseases in Cereals Commission in 1867.

He died at his home, Blair Place, Smithfield.

== Family ==
He married Jean Smith (ca.1820 – 2 February 1911); among their five sons and three daughters were:

- Margaret Hogarth (17 Feb 1843 - 10 Aug 1927) married John Warren jnr. on 11 December 1863
- John Hogarth (28 Jul 1844 – 5 Jan 1920) was manager of Strangways Springs for 26 years
- William Hogarth (8 Sep 1846 – 30 Jan 1912) married Belle Bowman (ca.1855 – 29 November 1892), daughter of William Bowman on 28 April 1881. He was manager of Elder, Smith and McCulloch's Momba Station near Bourke, New South Wales.
- Thomas Hogarth (31 Aug 1850 – 5 Oct 1929) managed Hogarth and Warren's Strangways Springs and Anna Creek stations.
- Robert Hogarth (23 Jun 1854 - 30 Nov 1933) married Alice Martha Grayson of Glenelg on 20 September 1894
- Alexander Hogarth (21 Dec 1856 – 2 Mar 1864 aged 8 years)
- David Hogarth (28 Feb 1859 - 3 Jan 1910) helped manage Anna Creek station
- Jessica Hogarth (10 Sep 1860 - 18 May 1861 aged 8 months)
