= John Ross (explorer) =

Scottish Australian drover and explorer

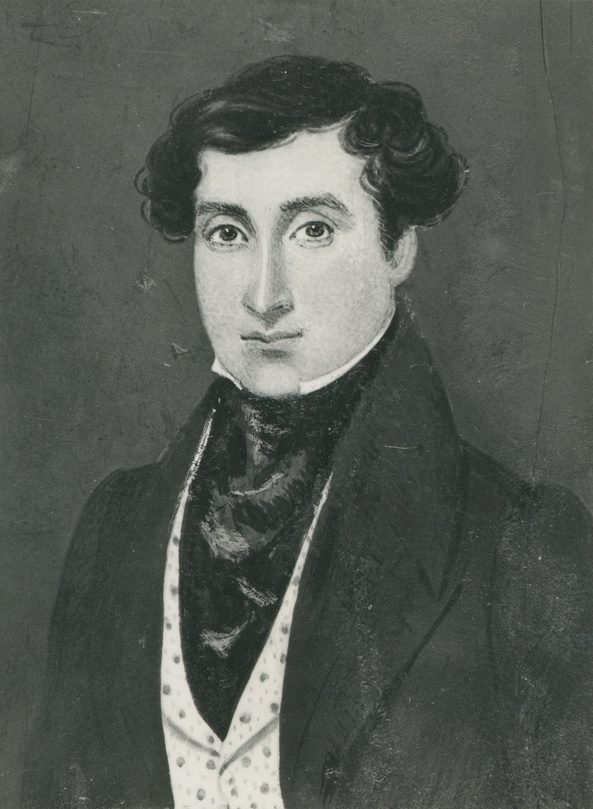
- John Ross as a young man
- Born: 17 May 1817; Bridgend, Scotland
- Died: 5 February 1903 (aged 85); Norwood, South Australia
- Occupations: Drover, explorer
- Known for: Leading exploration for the route of the Australian Overland Telegraph Line
- Children: 3

John Ross (17 May 1817 – 5 February 1903) was a Scottish Australian drover and explorer who led exploration of the route for the Australian Overland Telegraph Line.

Ross was born in Bridgend, Scotland. He emigrated to Australia in 1837, arriving in Sydney on 31 August 1837. He first gained employment as a shepherd for George Macleay and in 1838 he joined Charles Bonney in the first cattle drive from the Goulburn River to Adelaide, being considered an excellent bushman with an uncanny "nose" for water. In South Australia he successfully managed several large sheep properties and conducted exploration of the area.

In 1869, Ross explored the Stevenson River to Eringa and Mount Humphries; he named the mountains after his children, Sarah, Rebecca, Alexander and John. In 1870 his then employer Thomas Elder recommended Ross's service to Charles Todd, the colony's superintendent of telegraphs and government astronomer. Todd employed Ross to lead exploration of the route for the Australian Overland Telegraph Line. Ross's party ventured across the MacDonnell Ranges, the Simpson Desert, the Phillipson and Giles creeks and the Fergusson Ranges; (Note: Details of the movements of the exploration party and other observations were recorded by John Ross in a diary kept during the Overland Telegraph Survey Expedition; see State Records of South Australia GRG 154/1 Diary – John Ross, Leader, Overland Telegraph Survey Expedition, transcribed by GRG 154/2 Transcription of diary and miscellaneous papers – John Ross, Leader, Overland Telegraph Survey Expedition.) they also arrived at the Todd River. In March 1871 he arrived at, and gave an English name to, Alice Springs, but he found out that William Mills had been there before him. The party eventually made their way to Darwin.

Ross in his old age, about 1900

Ross was employed by Elder to explore between Peake and Perth. He failed due to lack of fresh water. He went on the manage properties in Victoria and Queensland, later returning to Norwood in South Australia to live with his daughter-in-law. He was almost blind, deaf and destitute when a newspaper appeal for "a little practical help ... [as] a deserving tribute to a worthy man" came too late. He died in Adelaide in poverty in 1903.

== See also ==
- List of explorers
