= Lake Cadibarrawirracanna =

Salt lake in South Australia

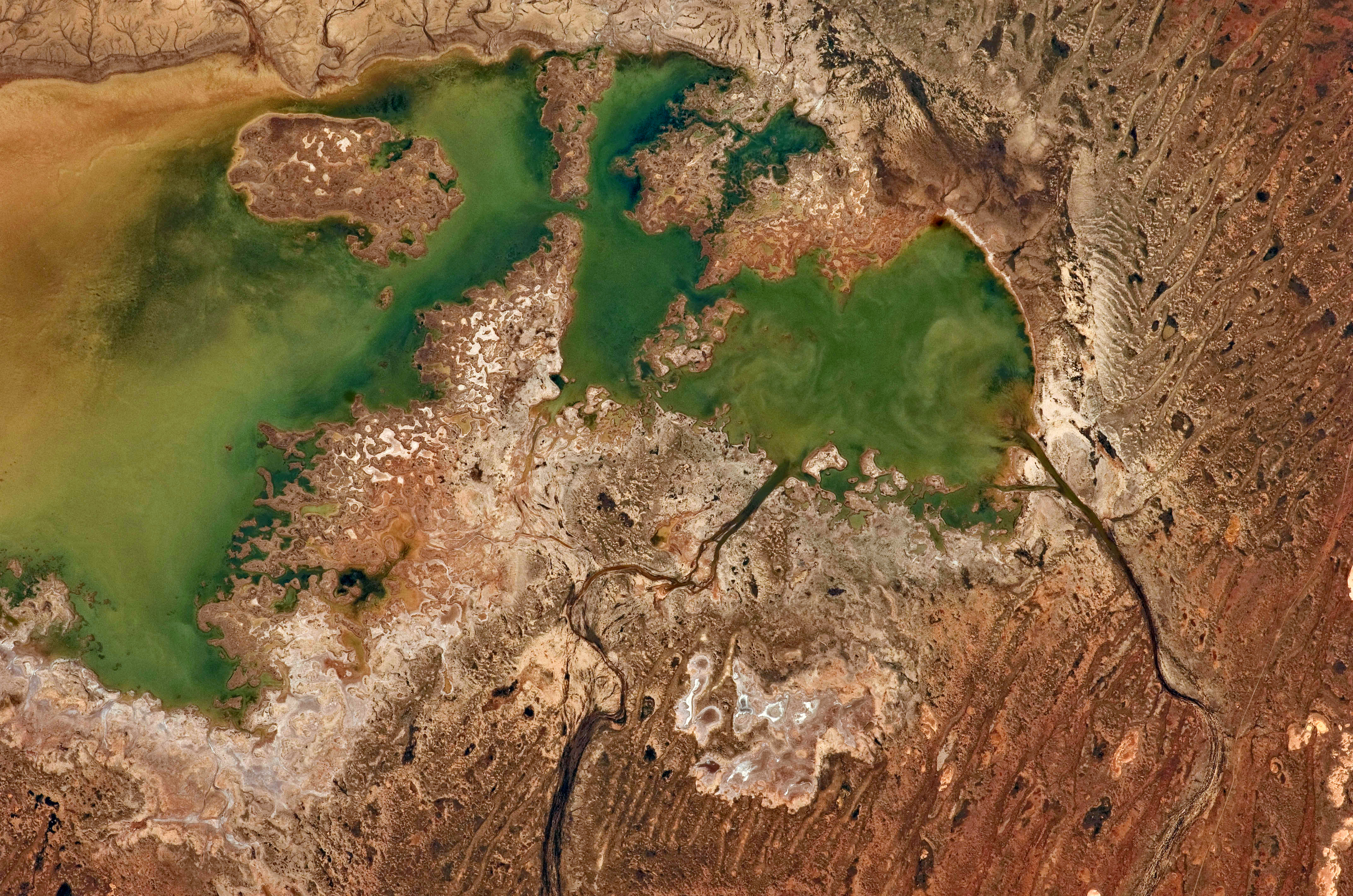
- View of lake taken during ISS Expedition 27

- Location in South Australia
- Location: Anna Creek, South Australia
- Coordinates: 28°51′17″S 135°28′42″E
- Type: Salt lake
- Basin countries: Australia
- Max. length: 32 kilometres (20 mi)
- Max. width: 9.7 kilometres (6 mi)
- Surface area: 220 square kilometres (85 mi^{2})

Lake Cadibarrawirracanna, informally known as Lake Cadi, is a salt lake in the Australian state of South Australia, in the locality of Anna Creek in the state's Far North region about 735 kilometres (457 mi) north-west of the state capital of Adelaide.

A South Australian government source describes the lake as having a length of 32 kilometres (20 mi), a width of 9.7 kilometres (6 mi) and an area of 220 square kilometres (85 mi^{2}).

Lake Cadibarrawirracanna, meaning the stars were dancing, is said to be the second longest official place name in Australia. In Arabana language, it is "Kardipirla warrakanha", where kardipirla is stars, warra- is dance, play, -ka is simple past tense, and -nha is a proper noun marker.

The lake is located within the boundaries of the Anna Creek Station pastoral lease and has public access established under the Pastoral Land Management and Conservation Act 1989 via an access road connecting to the Coober Pedy to William Creek Road about 6.5 kilometres (4.0 mi) to the south. The intersection with the access road is about 88 kilometres (55 mi) from Coober Pedy in the west and about 77 kilometres (48 mi) from William Creek in the east.

The lake is the subject of a song named "Carra Barra Wirra Canna" written by Morva Cogan and which was recorded in the 1960s by the Australian singer and musician, Rolf Harris.

== See also ==
- List of lakes of Australia § South Australia
- List of long place names
