= The Peake =

Telecommunications site, and pastoral property in South Australia.

Coordinates: 28°04′38″S 135°54′20″E

The Peake is an abandoned ruin on the banks of the Neales River in far north South Australia, near the mound springs complex known as Freeling Springs. The Peake was established initially as an outstation on the Mount Margaret Station, before becoming the main homestead in the late 1870s. It was a supply depot for the construction teams building the Overland Telegraph Line in 1870–1871, and also served as a repeater station on the Overland Telegraph Line from 1870 to 1891. It was a vital part of Australia's telecommunication network in the nineteenth century. Today it is part of the William Cattle Company holdings.

== The Arabana ==
The Peake is on the traditional lands of the Arabana people. The nearby mound spring complex – yardiya – contains important Dreaming sites. Ancestral figures including Yurkunangku and Kurkari camped at these springs. Other dreaming tracks also pass through this area. The Peake also sits on a trade route for pituri, and red ochre.

The Arabana had multiple different encounters with European explorers, settlers and anthropologists, starting in the 1850s with John McDouall Stuart. In 1875, Francis James Gillen documented vocabularies of the Arabana around the Peake Repeater Station where he was visiting. Gillen was working as a telegraphist on the Overland Telegraph Line at the time. Gillen returned to the Peake in 1903, with his colleague Walter Baldwin Spencer. They collected Arabana vocabulary, mythologies, placenames, song texts and other cultural information.

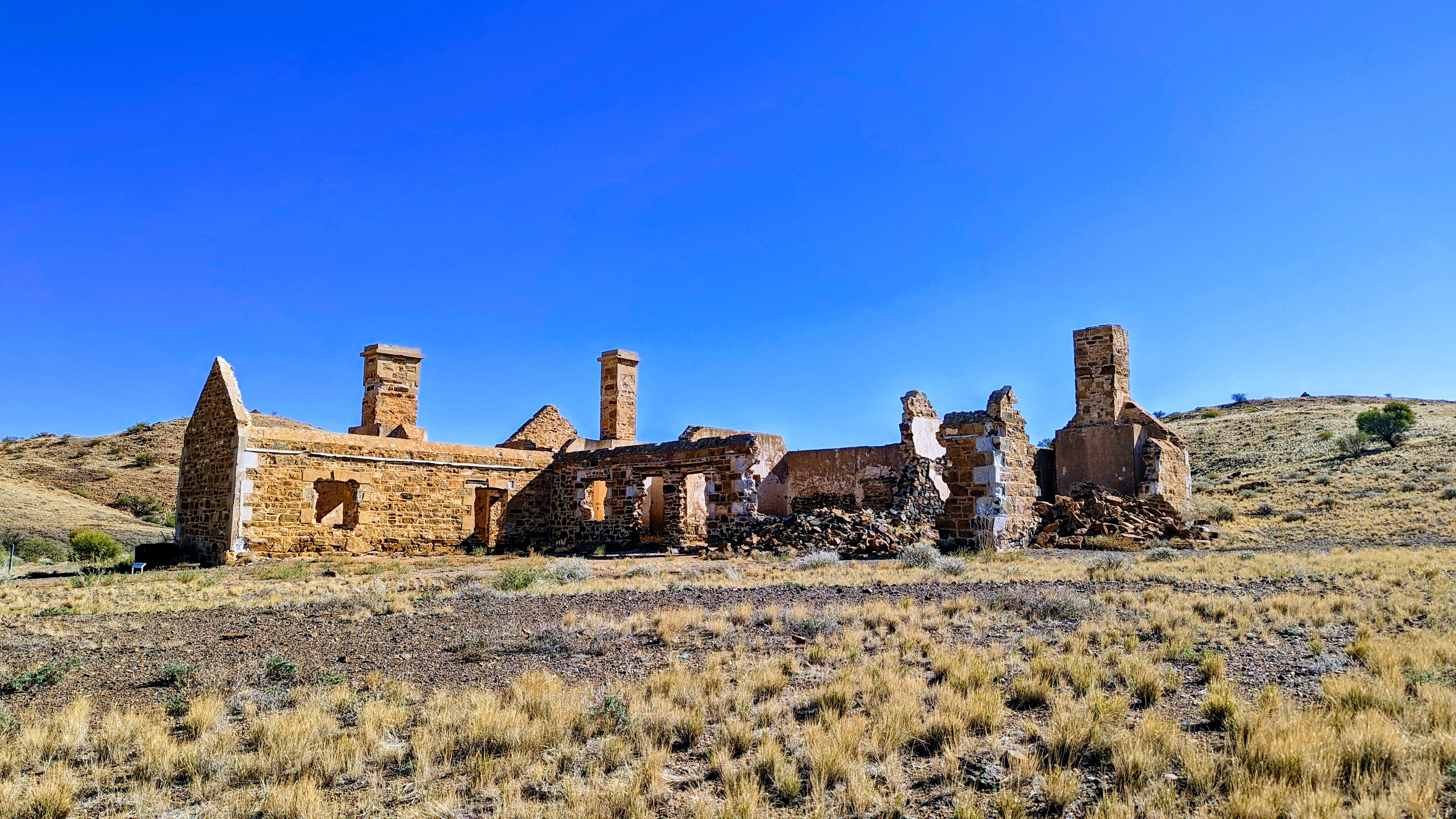
The ruins of the Peake Telegraph Station

The Arabana remained near the Peake throughout the 19th century; they were mentioned in various newspaper accounts, illustrations and sketches. The South Australian government maintained a ration depot at the Peake, and an estimated 68 Aboriginal people were present there in the 1890s; some worked as stockmen and others as rabbiters.

Today, the Peake is part of the Arabana Aboriginal Corporation land and remains an important part of the cultural geography for the Arabana.

== European exploration ==
1 Peake Creek
2 The Peake

European explorer John McDouall Stuart first arrived in the vicinity of the Peake in 1859, as part of an expedition surveying potential pastoral property in northern South Australia. In June 1859, he recorded the following in his journal:

At four miles and a half struck a large broad valley in which there are the largest springs I have yet seen. The flow of water from them is immense coming in numerous streams and the country around is beautiful. I have named these 'The Freeling Springs' after the honourable Major Freeling M.L.C. ... No person could wish for a better country for feed than that we have passed over to-day

The Peake itself was named by Stuart after Edward John Peake, a son-in-law of James Chambers, one of the explorer's patrons.

== Pastoral era ==
Mount Margaret Station was established in 1859 as a sheep and cattle station – it was about 1,250 square kilometers. It extended from the edge of Lake Eyre (Kathi Thandi) northwards up, including the Neales River, the Umbum Creek and the Freeling Springs mound springs complex. Pastoral activities were first located at Umbum waterhole, with the Peake as an outstation.

It was initially owned by Philip Levi, a British born, Jewish businessman who owned a number of sheep and cattle stations in the mid and far north of South Australia. The property was managed by Stephen Jarvis (born 1826, Britain; died 1879, Australia), who moved to Mount Margaret with his wife Ester and their four children. The "Great Drought" of 1864–1867 crippled Levi's holdings, and the property was sold off.

In 1872, the property was acquired by John Bagot and his brother Christopher. Stephen Jarvis was recruited to help work on the Overland Line, and was instrumental in building the repeater station at Barrow Creek. The Bagots appointed Ernest Courtenay Kempe (known as "Eck" to his friends) as the new overseer. The homestead was moved to the Peake, and a small community grew up around the homestead. In the 1890s, Kempe moved the homestead to Wood Duck. In the early 1900s, the Bagots sold up, and Kempe purchased the property in partnership with Sidney Kidman. It became part of Anna Creek Station.

In 2016, the Williams Cattle Company purchased The Peake Station, along with Anna Creek. Today, the Peake has a total area of 8130 square kilometers.

== Telegraph repeater station ==
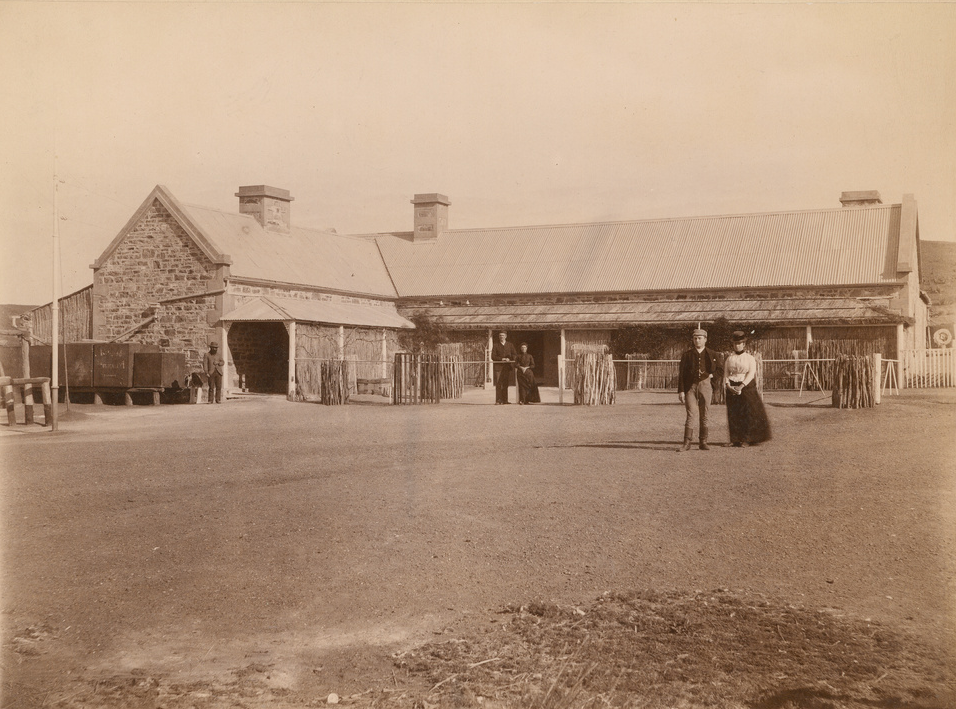
The Peake Telegraph Station in 1872

In 1870, work on the Overland Telegraph Line commenced. The southern section – from Port Augusta to Alberga Creek – was contracted to Edward Meade Bagot, the younger brother of the Mount Margaret Station owners. He was paid £41 per mile. He recruited Benjamin Herschel Babbage to help survey the route from Hergott Springs/Marree to Alberga Creek. He identified Strangways Springs and the Peake as suitable sites for repeater stations. The stations were necessary to ensure that the telegraph line was powered and maintained, and technology was sourced from Europe to power and connect these sites.

The Peake was also designated as a depot to supply the construction of the central section of the Overland Telegraph Line, from Alberga Creek to Alice Springs, via Charlotte Waters. In 1871, a stone store for rations was completed at the Peake, and Charles Todd and others had visited as they went north. Ultimately, several stone buildings would be built at the Peake, including the Repeater Station, a station master's residence and equipment rooms.

The repeater station was a vital part of the telecommunications infrastructure of the Overland Telegraph Line. Staffing a repeater station required a station master, at least one telegraph assistant and several linesmen who were responsible for maintenance of the equipment and the line itself. The repeater station received regular supplies from Adelaide and also maintained their own gardens, crops, chickens and goats. By 1884, there were 4 linesmen stationed at the Peake and also a blacksmith's shop, a cart shed, a harness room and stock yards, as well as a men's quarters and a kitchen.

In 1888, the Great Northern Railway, which had commenced in Port Augusta in 1878, finally arrived near the Peake, bringing with it large work camps, and many laborers. A camel depot was established by Faiz Mahomet and his brother Tagh who brought 600 camels with them. It is likely that there was a temporary mosque at the site. The influx of people also resulted in an increased police presence, temporary eating houses and the sales of illegal alcohol.

Visits to the repeater station included explorers John Forrest in 1874, and Charles Chewings in 1886; as well as the Transcontinental Railway Commission in 1887 and even Premier Playford made a visit in 1888. The repeater station also appeared in the papers and illustrated weeklies and monthlies.

In January 1891, the rail line reached Angle Pole, and the settlement of Oodnadatta was established as the railhead, which it would remain until 1926. The telegraph line was re-poled to follow the rail line; the repeater station at Peake was closed, and the services were established at Oodnadatta.

The repeater station was entered into the South Australian Heritage Register in 1987.
