= Strangways Springs =

- Coordinates: 29°09′14.4″S 136°34′20.5″E
- Country: Australia
- State: South Australia

Strangways Springs is a significant mound springs complex in South Australia. It consists of a nearly two kilometer square area, full of hundreds of mound springs and soaks, surrounded by gibber plains. It is located just off the Oodnadatta track, 39 kilometers south of William Creek. It is on the traditional lands of the Arabana people who call it Pangki Warrunha. It is one of a series of similar formations that extend along the western edge of Kati Thanda (Lake Eyre) from Marree to Dalhousie Springs including Freeling Springs, and the Blanche Cup and the Bubbler in the Wabma Kadarbu Mound Springs Conservation Park, among others.

In the 19th century, Strangways Springs was a pastoral property, one of eleven repeater stations on Australia's Overland Telegraph Line and a stop on the Great Northern Railway. It was a critical part of the nation's communication system.

== Pangki Warrunha ==
Pangki Warrunha is on the traditional lands of the Arabana people. It was created by Arabana ancestral figures Kurkari (the ancestral green snake) and Yurkunganku (the ancestral red belly black snake) when they made camp for the night in the dreamtime. The name means 'white ribs'' which aptly describes the sedimentary deposits around many of its mound springs.

Archaeological excavations have found signs of human occupation to the immediate west of Pangki Warrunha dating back to 560–700 years before present. Well documented trade routes for red ochre from near Parachilna, grind stones from Sunny Creek on Anna Creek Station and pitchuri connect Pangki Warrunha to other sites in South Australia and the Northern Territory. Even after colonial contact, and significant disruptions to traditional patterns, the Arabana found ways to engage with these trade routes. According to historian Michael Duke, the Arabana employed cameleers to transport red ochre from the traditional mines in the south to their country, and later used the railways to move ochre.

== European exploration, 1850s ==
In 1858, an expedition by Benjamin Herschel Babbage and Peter Edgerton Warburton was sent to determine if there was suitable pastoral land north of Lake Torrens . Warburton reached Pangki Warrunha on 28 December 1858 and named the area for Strangways Springs in honor of H.B.T. Strangways, who was, at the time, a member of South Australia House of Assembly and would later become one of the colony's premiers. Warburton wrote that the surrounding area as "fit for pastoral purposes"'.

== Pastoral property, 1859- ==
As a result of the work of Babbage and Warburton, and the maps they drew, European settlement extended into the far north of South Australia, with Strangways Springs and the surrounding area established as a sheep station in 1859. A stone homestead was built on the mound springs, and a large wool scour was established, along with stone-walled sheep pens. The property changed hands several times in the nineteenth century and was impacted the droughts in the 1860s and 1890s.The homestead was relocated to Anna Creek in 1876 but there were still significant pastoral activities in and around Strangways Springs including the presence of an overseer, stockmen, and stock.

Throughout the late 1800s and early 1900s, the Arabana established camps near Strangways Springs, which served as a ration depot and also offered employment. They maintained a strong presence in the area and their relationships with the local pastoralists appear to be less violent than those elsewhere. A newspaper account in 1891 about life at Strangways Springs features photographs and short biographies of several Arabana stockmen who worked on the property—Kalli Kalli, Bill Rowdy and Tilbrook. Government officials estimated 50-150 Arabana were working and living around Strangways in the early 1900s.

Today Strangways Springs and the surrounding area is part of Anna Creek Station—one of the largest cattle stations in the world.

== The Telegraph Repeater Station (1872-1896) & the railway (1885-1979) ==
in 1870, Benjamin Herschel Babbage identified Strangways Springs (along with Beltana and the Peake) as a possible site for a telegraph station on the Overland Telegraph Line. The original homestead was requisitioned and additional buildings and infrastructure were added, including a very large, stone tank which provided rain water for the telegraph batteries and the residents. The presence of a telegraph station meant that Strangways Spring became a more permanent settlement and the population grew considerably.

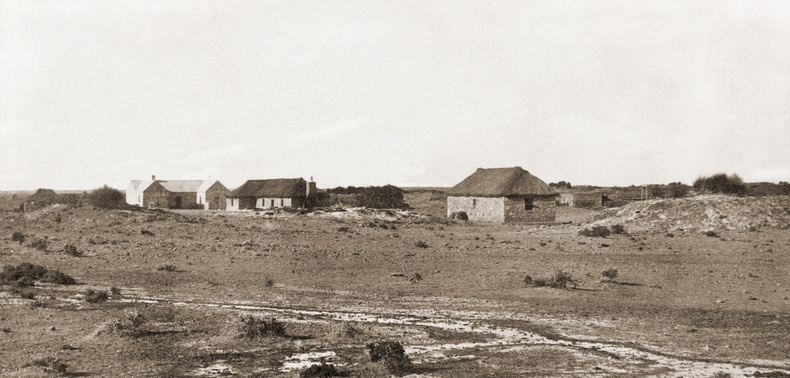
Strangways Springs, late 1800s. Courtesy of the State Library of South Australia, B1486

Before the arrival of the railway in the late 1880s, camel trains delivered goods to Strangways Springs from Marree, and there is archaeological evidence of a camel depot at the Springs.

The Great Northern Railway (the Ghan) extending from Marree to Strangways Springs was completed late in 1886. The railway station was just to the south and east of the Springs. This brought an influx of hundreds of workers, and there was briefly a hotel, an eating house, and a police station. The first trains arrived in March 1887 with a weekly service from Adelaide.

In October 1896, the Telegraph station was decommissioned, and its functions were moved nearby to William Creek. The buildings were abandoned and fell into significant disrepair. In 1979, the railway line was relocated closer to the Stuart Highway.

== Pangki Warrunha today ==
Today, Pangki Warrunha/Strangways Springs can be accessed via the Oodnadatta Track. It was added to the South Australian Heritage register in 1986. The site is maintained by a volunteer organisation, the Friends of the Mound Springs, who partner with the Arabana traditional owners and South Australian park and wildlife authorities. The Friends of Mound Springs have tasked themselves with the signage and upkeep of the site.

Today, Pangki Warrunha is part of the Arabana Aboriginal Corporation land and remains an important part of the cultural geography for the Arabana.
