= Arabana people =

Aboriginal Australian people of South Australia

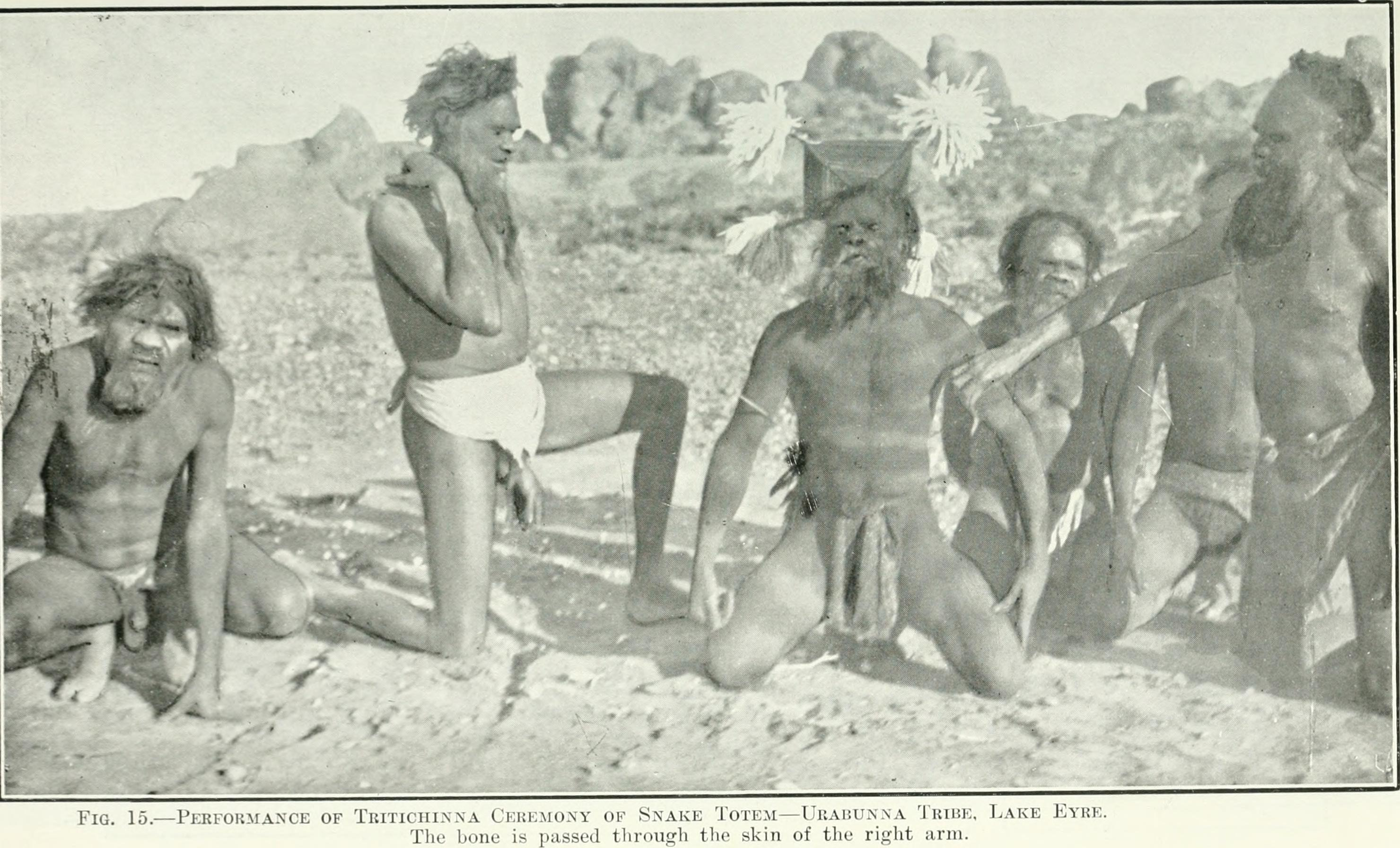
Performance of tritichinna ceremony of snake totem, Urabunna Tribe, Lake Eyre (pub. in The commonwealth of Australia; federal handbook, prepared in connection with the eighty-fourth meeting of the British association for the advancement of science, held in Australia, August, 1914 by George Handley Knibbs

The Arabana, also known as the Ngarabana, are an Aboriginal Australian people of South Australia.

== Name ==
In the Arabana language, initial /ŋ/ underwent elision and this process continued into the 20th century (e.g. in 19th century wordlists, "yes" is given as ngarayi, but in 1994 the word was invariably pronounced arayi). Thus, the language's name used to be Ngarabana, rather than the current form Arabana.

== Language ==
Arabana, like Wangganguru with which it shares a 90% overlap in vocabulary, is a member of the Karnic subgroup of the Pama-Nyungan language.

== Country ==
In Norman Tindale's estimation, the Arabana controlled some 19,500 square miles (51,000 km^{2}) of tribal land. They were present at the Neales River to the west of Lake Eyre, and west as far as the Stuart Range; Macumba Creek. Southwards their lands extended to Coward Springs. Their terrain also took in Oodnadatta, Lora Creek and Lake Cadibarrawirracanna.

The neighbouring tribes were the Kokata to the west, with the frontier between the two marked by the scarp of the western tableland near Coober Pedy. To their east were the Wangkanguru.

== Culture ==
=== Mythology ===
Several traditional stories are well documented, especially that regarding a man-eating buzzard and his eaglehawk mate. The chief protagonists are three animals:

- Wantu Wantu, the man-eating black-breasted buzzard
- Irritye or Irretye, a friendly wedge-tailed eagle
- Kutta Kutta (variantly called Akwete Akwete) who, though described as a small hawk is actually the spotted nightjar

=== Social organisation ===
The Arabana were divided into kin groups, whose respective territories were called wadlu.

- Jendakarangu (Coward Springs)
- Peake tribe
- Anna Creek tribe

==== Moieties ====
Like the surrounding tribes of the Lake Eyre Basin, the Arabana had two matrilineal moieties. Their moieties were named Mathari and Kararru, which had matrilineal totemic divisions called mardu 'flavour'. Due to population decline, only a few of the totemic divisions had survived:

Mathari		Kararru	
wadnhamara	grub	arkapa	red ochre
thantani	shag	wakarla	crow
karrawara	eaglehawk	warrukathi	emu
kukurla	golden bandicoot	warrukathi	emu

Marrying within one's own moiety was prohibited, and considered to be like incest. However, in the 1940s, intramoiety marriages began to occur, and by 1990s the prohibition was largely ignored, and most young people did not not know their moiety or mardu.

== History ==
Arabana people were impacted by pastoralism and infrastructure developments such as the Australian Overland Telegraph Line, completed in 1872, and the railway line linking Adelaide and Oodnadatta, opened in 1891.

The Arabana were interviewed at Old Peake Station and Thantyiwanparda in the nearby gidgee scrub by Walter Baldwin Spencer and Francis James Gillen over a ten-day period in August 1903 for a specific purpose. Their earlier work had argued that the truly "primitive" nature of the Arrernte was indicated by the fact that their totemic identities came from the spirit responsible for making individuals' mothers pregnant. James Frazer adopted this to buttress his theories on the development phases of "primitive societies". A Scottish amateur ethnographer Andrew Lang contested their interpretations of the Arrernte, arguing that they were not "primitive", a label he argued was more appropriate to their near neighbours the Arabana, who traced descent through the mother and linked their totemic system to exogamy. It was to address this challenge that accounted for Spencer and Gillen's return to Arabana lands.

=== Modern ===
Most Arabana live away from their traditional land, in areas such as Adelaide, Port Augusta, Marree, Coober Pedy, Oodnadatta, Alice Springs and Darwin.

Today, cross-cultural research collaborations are building on Arabana traditional knowledge and colonial and pastoral experiences to develop new ways of approaching modelling climate change.

=== Native title ===
A native title claim was lodged with the National Native Title Tribunal on 16 January 1998 by Arabana elder Reg Dodd, on behalf of his people. In 2012, a Federal Court determination in the matter of Dodd v the State of South Australia gave the Arabana people native title to over 68,000 km^{2} (26,000 sq mi), including Anna Creek Station and other pastoral leases, along with Lake Eyre. The area also included Elliot Price Conservation Park, Kati Thanda–Lake Eyre National Park, and Wabma Kadarbu Mound Springs Conservation Park, along with the towns of Marree, William Creek, and Oodnadatta. The Tribunal found that the Arabana maintained strong and enduring connections to country, each other and their culture.

The Arabana Corporation are the native title holders of the land.

In October 2025, it was alleged that the owners of Anna Creek Station had built illegal dams on rivers and waterholes on the property between 2017 and 2025, including a dam wall around 2 km (1.2 mi) long across Balta-Baltana Creek. The earthworks contravened the Aboriginal Heritage Act, the Natural Resources Management Act and the Landscape South Australia Act.

== Alternative names ==
- Arabuna, Arrabunna, Arrabonna, Arubbinna
- Arapani
- Arapina (Iliaura pronunciation)
- Ngarabana
- Nulla
- Rabuna (an occasional Aranda pronunciation)
- Urapuna, Urabuna, Urabunna, Urroban
- Wangarabana ([a term reflecting a word woqka /wagka meaning "speech")
- Wongkurapuna, Wangarabunna
- Yendakarangu

Source: Tindale 1974, p. 210

== Some words ==
- kutyu, ritual assassin, kurdaitcha
- thanthani (cormorant) also the name of a totem

Source: Gibson & Hercus 2018, p. 207, n.37

== Sources ==
- Basedow, Herbert (1925). The Australian Aboriginal. F.W. Preece and Sons.
- Bates, Daisy (2018). "Aborigines of the West Coast of South Australia; vocabularies and ethnological notes". Transactions of the Royal Society of South Australia. 42. Adelaide: 152–167 – via BHL.
- East, J. J. (1889). Aborigines of South and Central Australia. Adelaide.
- Elkin, A. P. (September 1931). "The Social Organization of South Australian Tribes". Oceania. 2 (1): 44–73. doi:10.1002/j.1834-4461.1931.tb00022.x. JSTOR 40327353.
- Elkin, A. P. (March 1940a). "Kinship in South Australia (Continued)". Oceania. 10 (3): 295–349. doi:10.1002/j.1834-4461.1940.tb00295.x. JSTOR 40327772.
- Elkin, A. P. (June 1940b). "Kinship in South Australia (Continued)". Oceania. 10 (4): 369–388. doi:10.1002/j.1834-4461.1940.tb00302.x. JSTOR 40327864.
- Eylmann, Erhard (1908). Die Eingeborenen der Kolonie Südaustralien (PDF). Berlin: D.Reimer – via Internet Archive.
- Gibson, Jason; Hercus, Luise A. (December 2018). Roberts, Amy; Wesley, Daryl (eds.). "Capturing Histories at Thantyu-Wanparda: Comparising early and late twentieth century ethnographies in Arabana Territory, South Australia". Journal of the Anthropological Society of South Australia. 32: 175–210.
- Helms, Richard (1896). "Anthropology of the Elder Exploring Expedition. 1871-1872". Transactions of the Royal Society of South Australia. 16. Adelaide: 237–332 – via BHL.
- Hercus, Luise A. (1968). "Some aspects of the form and use of the trial number in Victorian languages and Arabana". Mankind. 6 (8): 335–337.
- Hercus, Luise A. (2011). "Murkarra, a landscape nearly forgotten" (PDF). In Hercus, Luise A.; Koch, Harold (eds.). Aboriginal Placenames: Naming and re-naming the Australian landscape. ANU E Press/Aboriginal History. pp. 257–272. ISBN 978-1-921-66608-7.
- Howitt, Alfred William (1904). The native tribes of south-east Australia (PDF). Macmillan.
- Howitt, Alfred William; Siebert, Otto (January–June 1904). "Legends of the Dieri and Kindred Tribes of Central Australia". The Journal of the Anthropological Institute of Great Britain and Ireland. 34: 100–129. doi:10.2307/2843089. JSTOR 2843089.
- Knibbs, George Handley, ed. (18 July 1914). "The commonwealth of Australia; federal handbook, prepared in connection with the eighty-fourth meeting of the British association for the advancement of science, held in Australia, August, 1914". Melbourne: A. J. Mullet, government printer – via Internet Archive.
- "Lora Creek, Australia - Geographical Names, map, geographic coordinates". geographic.org.
- Mathews, R. H. (January 1900). "Divisions of the South Australian Aborigines". Proceedings of the American Philosophical Society. 39 (161): 78–91+93. JSTOR 983545.
- Parker, K. Langloh (1905). The Euahlayi tribe; a study of aboriginal life in Australia (PDF). A. Constable & Co. – via Internet Archive.
- Shaw, Bruce (1995). Our Heart Is the Land: Aboriginal Reminiscences from the Western Lake Eyre Basin. Aboriginal Studies Press. ISBN 978-0-855-75569-0.
- Spencer, Sir Baldwin; Gillen, Francis J. (1904). Northern Tribes of Central Australia (PDF). Macmillan Publishers – via Internet Archive.
- Spencer, Sir Baldwin; Gillen, Francis J. (1912). Across Australia (PDF). Vol. 2. Macmillan Publishers – via Internet Archive.
- Strehlow, C. (1910). Leonhardi, Moritz von (ed.). Die Aranda- und Loritja-Stämme in Zentral-Australien Part 3 (PDF). Joseph Baer & Co.
- Taplin, George (1879). Folklore, manners, customs and languages of the South Australian aborigines (PDF). Adelaide: E Spiller, Acting Government Printer – via Internet Archive.
- Tindale, Norman Barnett (1974). Aboriginal Tribes of Australia: Their Terrain, Environmental Controls, Distribution, Limits, and Proper Names. Australian National University Press. ISBN 978-0-708-10741-6.
