= William Creek, South Australia =

William Creek
- Town
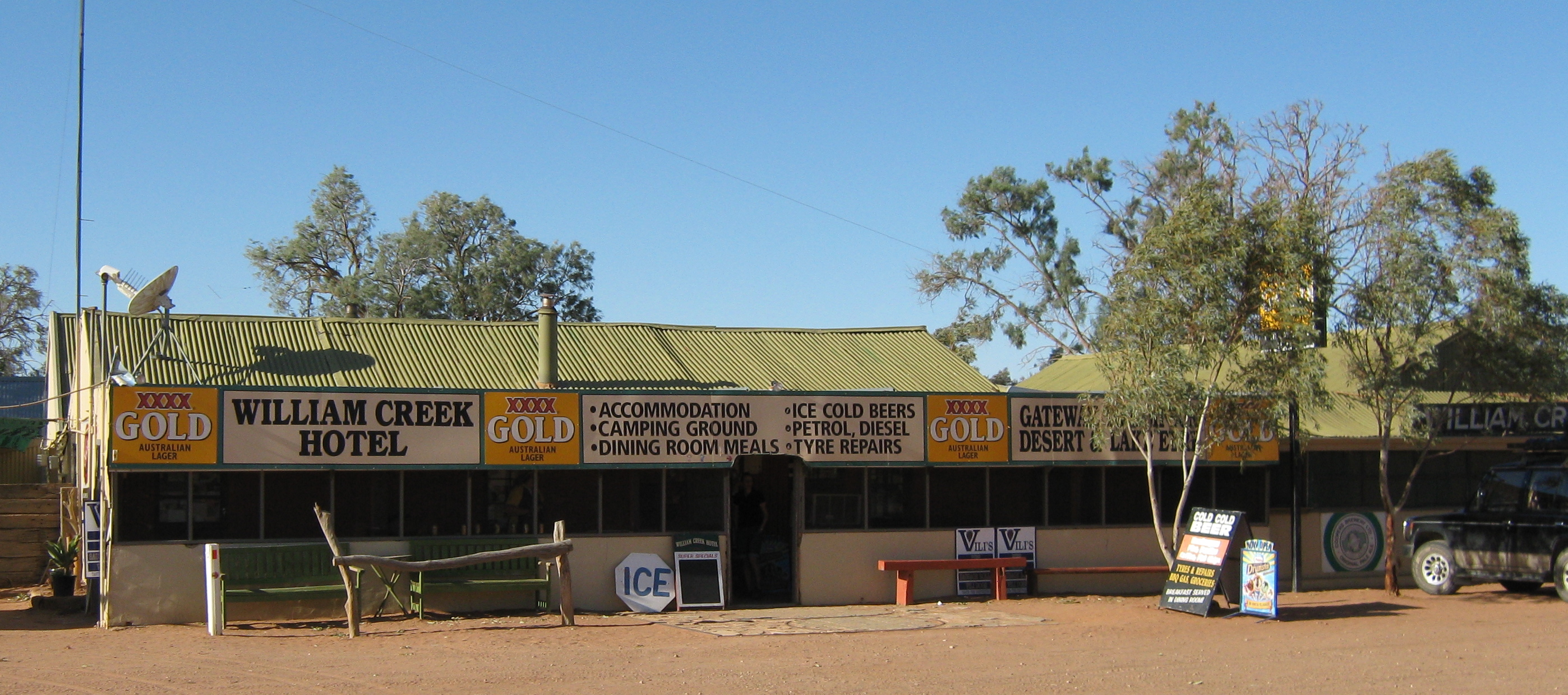
- The heritage-listed William Creek Hotel

- Coordinates: 28°54′33″S 136°20′27″E
- Country: Australia
- State: South Australia
- LGA: Outback Communities Authority
- Location: 852 km (529 mi) from Alice Springs by road; 823 km (511 mi) from Adelaide by road
- Established: 1889

Government
  - State electorate: Stuart
  - Federal division: Grey
- Elevation: 77 m (253 ft)

Population
  - Total: 17 (SAL 2021)
- Time zone: UTC+9:30 (ACST)
  - Summer (DST): UTC+10:30 (ACST)
- Mean max temp: 27.8 °C (82.0 °F)
- Mean min temp: 13.7 °C (56.7 °F)
- Annual rainfall: 158.0 mm (6.22 in)
Localities around William Creek
Anna Creek	Anna Creek	Anna Creek
Anna Creek	William Creek	Anna Creek
Anna Creek	Anna Creek	Anna Creek
- Temperature data are from Coober Pedy, the nearest weather station.; Source for adjoining localities

William Creek, in the Outback region of the Australian state of South Australia, is an isolated township with a population of fewer than 20. It is located about half-way along the Oodnadatta Track, 210 km (130 mi) north-west of Marree and 166 km (103 mi) east of Coober Pedy.

== Location ==
William Creek is the entry point from Coober Pedy to Kati Thanda–Lake Eyre in the Tirari Desert. It offers the only petrol station between Marree, Coober Pedy, and Oodnadatta on the Oodnadatta Track, and has a campground, two motels and one of the world's most remote pubs. The world's largest cattle station is located in nearby Anna Creek Station and the Woomera Prohibited Area is also nearby.

The township is a convenient half-way stop along the track, with accommodation and meals at the hotel and a well-maintained if somewhat dusty campground. In the Memorial Park it is possible to see many diverse items, including a commemorative inscription to a young Austrian woman, who died in 1998 trying to walk back to William Creek from a four-wheel drive vehicle bogged in the sand beside Kati Thanda–Lake Eyre.

William Creek is serviced twice weekly by the Coober Pedy Oodnadatta One Day Mail Run. The four-wheel-drive mail truck also carries some general freight and passengers.

== History ==
William Creek is on the traditional lands of the Arabana people. In 2012, the Federal Court granted the Arabana people native title to more than 68,000 square kilometres in the region.

The name William Creek was given to the area in November 1859 by explorer John McDouall Stuart during his expeditions in the area. William was the second son of John Chambers, a pioneer pastoralist of South Australia and a strong ally of Stuart.

A small settlement arose in 1889 as a result of the arrival of the Great Northern railway – later named the Central Australia Railway and now sometimes known popularly as the Ghan line, after one of the trains that ran on the line. Construction of the railway started in 1878 near Port Augusta. Work on the line continued northward, ultimately linking Port Augusta to Oodnadatta, which became the railhead until the late 1920s. As large work parties flowed into the area, a boarding house was established in 1886 and James Jagoe's Eating House is recorded there in 1886. In 1890, Henry Lane received a wine licence for the site and assume Jagoe's business and facilities. In 1911, Gilbert Reed described a whistle-stop on a train journey to Oodnadatta; he ate at Paige's boarding house, where the meal was goat, dressed up as mutton.

Early tourists to the area were mesmerised by the vast expanses, the heat, the mound springs and the distances.

In 1896, a telegraph office was opened – William Creek became a repeater station on the Australian Overland Telegraph Line. It replaced nearby Strangways Springs, which was decommissioned and reverted to pastoral lands.

During World War II, hundreds of troops were transported northwards along the Central Australia Railway every day. In 1943, due to the amount of alcohol consumed on the trains, the stop at William Creek was reduced from 10 minutes to 2 minutes. The hotelier complained, to no avail, and in 1945 troop trains were scheduled not to stop at all. However, the trains would travel extremely slowly, and passengers would jump off the train before the station, sprint to the hotel, buy their drink and run after the train.

The town has always been small: never larger than a few cottages, a small school and a hotel-store. The historic William Creek Hotel is listed on the South Australian Heritage Register. Following the closure and dismantling of the Central Australia Railway in 1980, William Creek has become the only township along the Oodnadatta Track from Marree to Oodnadatta.

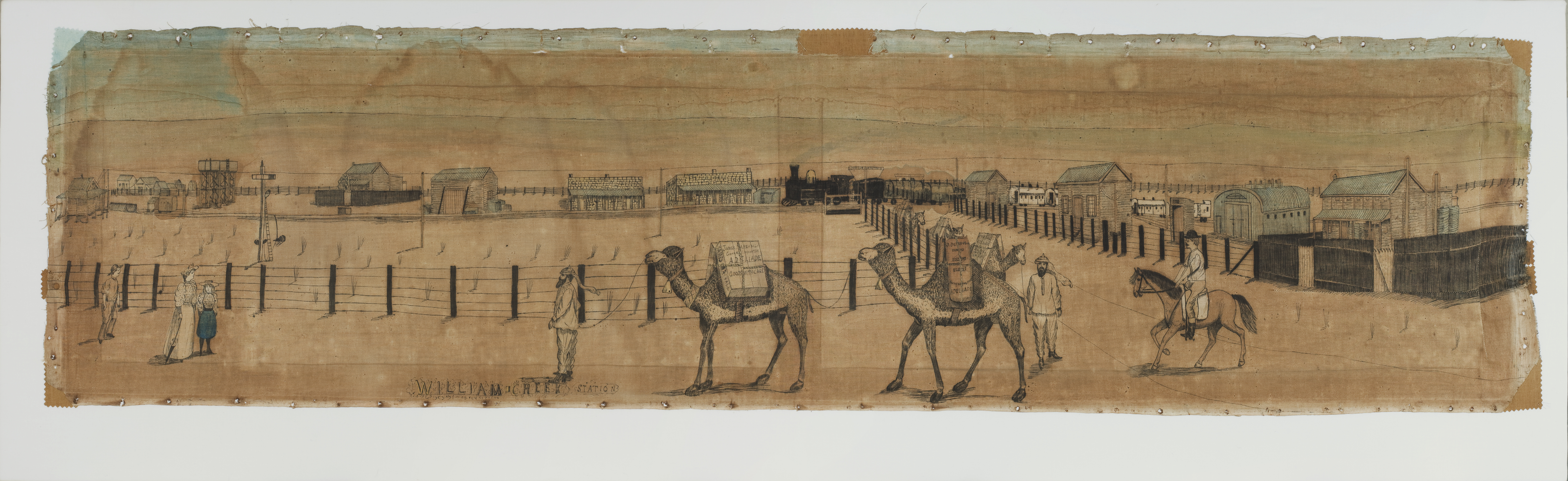

An ink drawing on fabric of William Creek settlement, early 1890s

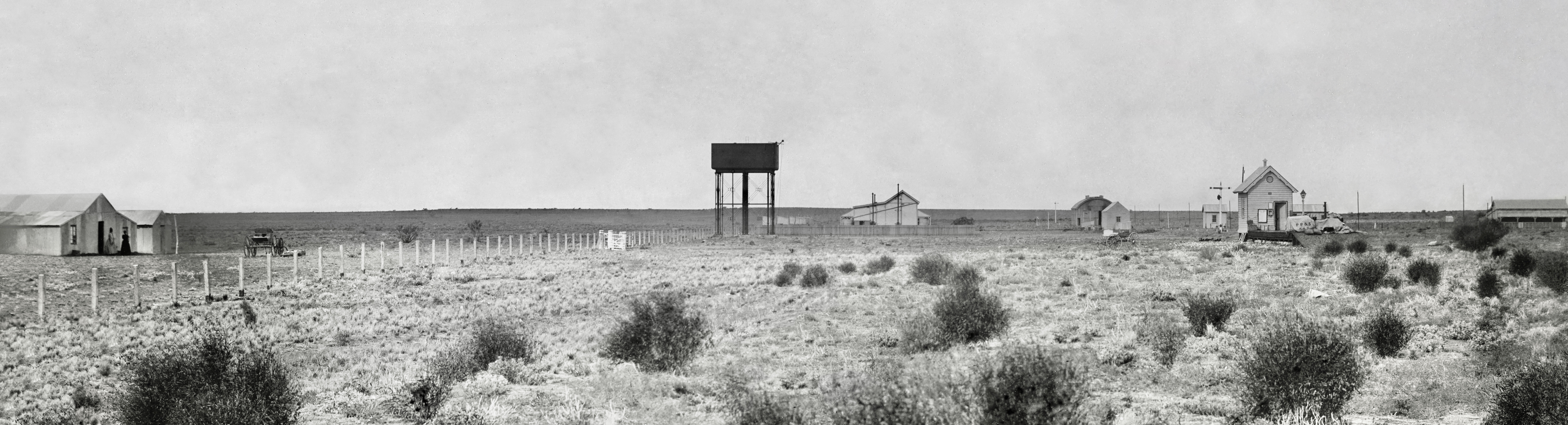

William Creek railway station, early 1890s.

== Governance ==
William Creek is in the federal electoral division of Grey and the state electoral district of Stuart. It is in the 63% of South Australia that is unincorporated, i.e. outside the jurisdiction of local government council areas; an area of 625,000 square kilometres (241,000 square miles), 2 1/2 times that of the United Kingdom. The 4500 residents in this area – less than 0.2% of the state's population – receive municipal services from a state government agency, the Outback Communities Authority, in a hybrid management model involving local government and community self-management.

== Near William Creek ==
Kati Thanda–Lake Eyre can be seen from several vantage points along the Oodnadatta Track and appears as a large white saltpan. It is only from the air that its immensity can be appreciated. The curvature of the Earth can be seen on the horizon and beneath it is possible to identify the courses of the ancient rivers that still occasionally flow into the lake. Trevor Wright and the pilots from Wrightsair take up to five passengers for a 60-minute flight out of William Creek, passing over the spectacular Painted Hills to the west, then along the southern edge of the lake, pointing out the features beneath and explaining the topography. The Painted Hills are brilliantly coloured eroded sandstone ridges. These, and all of the country traversed in the one-hour flight, are part of Anna Creek Station. From the air the Oodnadatta Track can be seen, stretching to the horizon in two directions.

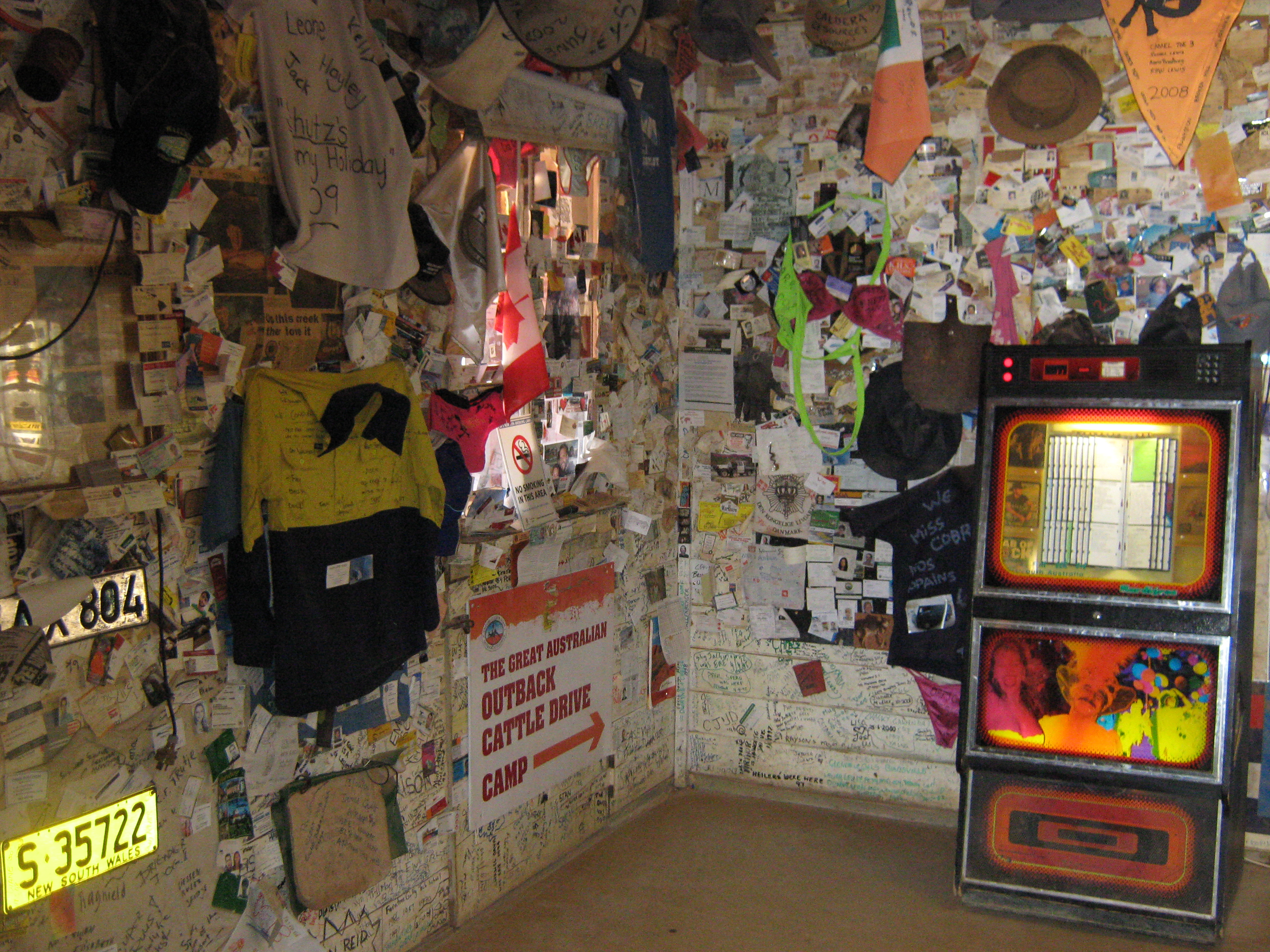

A corner of the William Creek Hotel in which travellers have left memorabilia

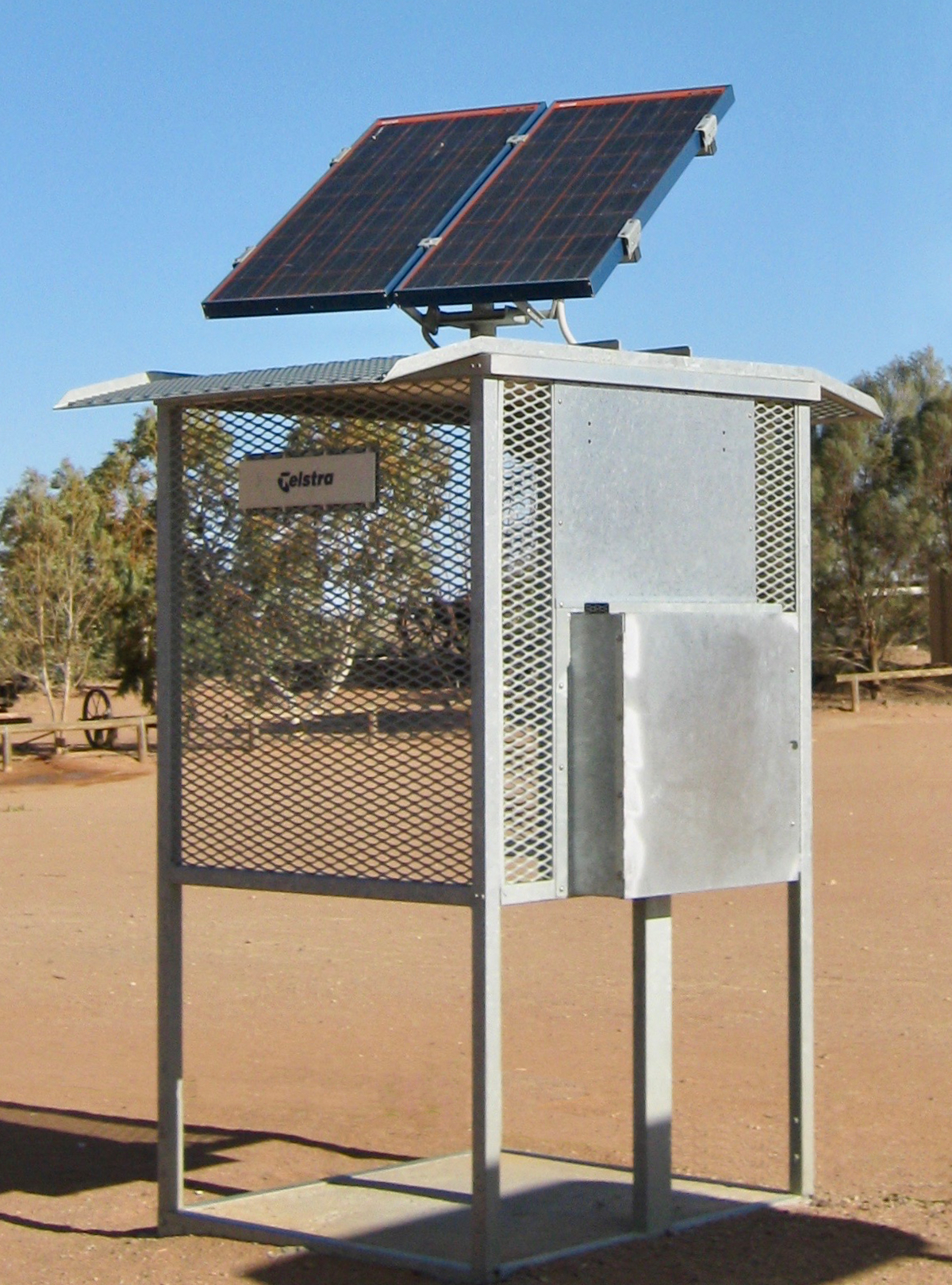

The first solar-powered public telephone in Australia at William Creek

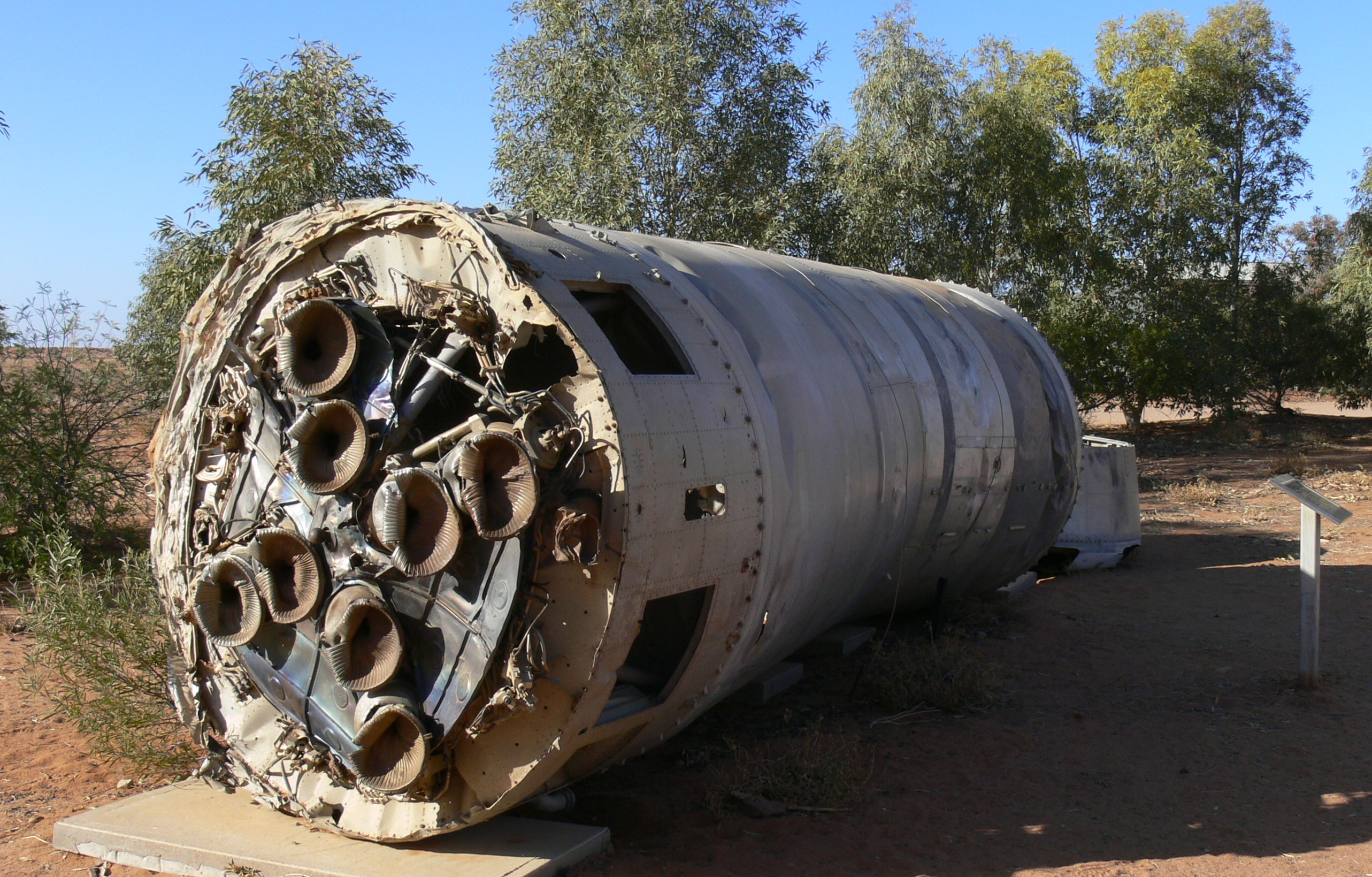

The remains of stage 1 of the R3 rocket in the Memorial Park, William Creek. Launched from the Woomera Rocket Range in 1971, the rocket engine was recovered from Anna Creek Station.
