= Edward John Peake =

Australian winemaker and politician

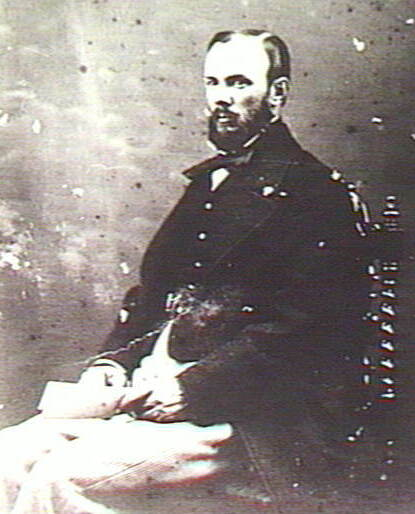

Member of the South Australian House of Assembly for The Burra and Clare
- In office March 1857 – October 1859

Personal details
- Born: 1822
- Died: 23 March 1876 (aged 53–54)

Edward John Peake (1822 – 23 March 1876) was a winemaker, auctioneer, land agent, magistrate Member of Parliament and a prominent member of the Catholic Church in the early days of South Australia. born in Gloucestershire.

He arrived in Australia around 1852 and spent several years touring the country before settling in Adelaide around 1855 and in 1858 purchased from John Morphett (acting for William Augustine Leigh (1802–1873), of Little Aston Hall, Staffordshire) a farm in Clarendon, which he developed as a vineyard and winery. On his travels he made several sketches which survive. His knowledge of English Gothic Revival style of architecture influenced the design of St Francis Xavier's Cathedral, Adelaide.

He was granted an auctioneer's licence in 1855. He was Chairman of Adelaide City Council in 1856

He was appointed J.P. in 1857, elevated to Special Magistrate in 1860, based at Willunga and Stipendiary Magistrate January to September 1868 when he was removed from the list. but reinstated.

It was only a few years ago that the Government made Mr. Peake a Magistrate, and the other Magistrates objected so much to the appointment that they refused to sit with him; and yet now it was acknowledged that he was one of the best Magistrates in the colony, and that his decisions would bear the scrutiny of the Supreme Court and the Privy Council. ... William Townsend, MHA

He was elected to the South Australian House of Assembly seat of The Burra and Clare in March 1857 and resigned in October 1859 when he was appointed manager of the Traffic Branch of the South Australian Railways.

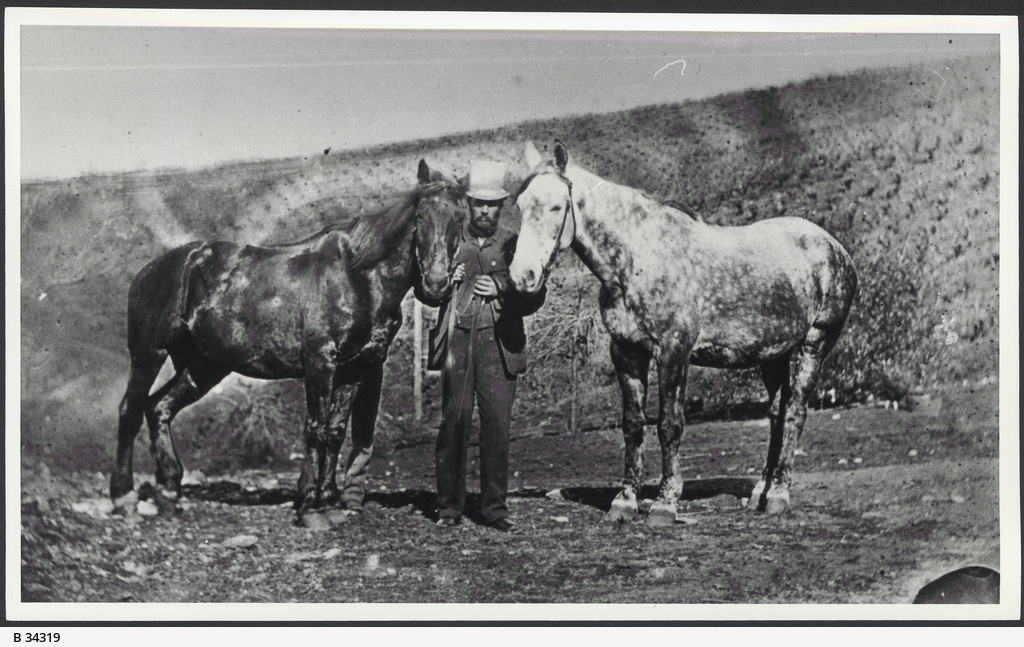
Edward John Peake, South Australian M.P., holding two of his prized horses, the Clarendon vineyard in the background, circa 1890.

He was a member of the Southern Rifle Association (part of South Australia's volunteer militia force) and in 1862 its President He was also Chairman of the Duryea Mining Company.

He left Clarendon in 1870 and served as Stipendiary Magistrate at Port Adelaide until late 1874, when he was forced by increasing ill health to resign.

== Family ==
His mother Mary Peake (c. 1801 – 21 August 1867) died at Clarendon.

He married Elizabeth Newman ( – 18 April 1882) on 29 June 1867

Elizabeth, the eldest daughter of James Chambers, was the widow of John Holden Newman (ca.1835 – 11 November 1863). Her son John Holden Newman jnr. was born on 13 March 1864, married Beatrice Emma Tate (daughter of professor Ralph Tate) and died 29 August 1911 in England.

== Legacy ==
His winery, built in 1858, was later developed as the Old Clarendon Inn, and refurbished in the late 20th century as a restaurant and accommodation,

Peake Creek was named for him by John McDouall Stuart in June 1859 and hence Peake Station, or The Peake, South Australia The Peake, acquired by Kidman Holdings in 1898. The Peake telegraph station was built in 1870.
