= Anna Creek (Montana) =

Stream in Montana, United States

Coordinates: 48°09′55″N 113°47′17″W

Anna Creek is a stream in the U.S. state of Montana.

Anna Creek was named by a United States Geological Survey employee in honor of a local lady.
