= Anna Creek Station =

Cattle station in South Australia

Coordinates: 28°53′35″S 136°10′10″E

Location in South Australia

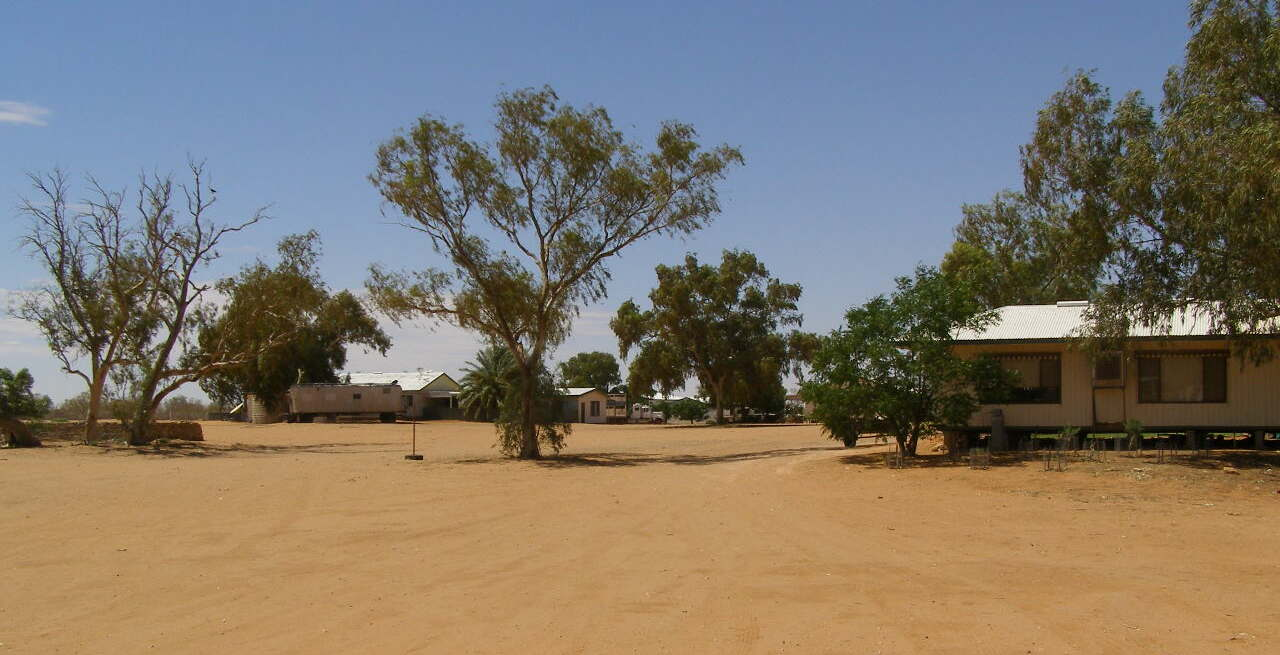
Anna Creek main homestead

Anna Creek Station is a pastoral lease located on arid land in the Australian state of South Australia, operating as a cattle station. At 23,876 km^{2} (9,219 sq mi; 5,900,000 acres), it is the world's largest working cattle station (or ranch). Established after British colonisation of South Australia on the lands of the Arabana people, the lease was first purchased from the colonial government in 1863. As of 2025 it is owned by the Williams family.

== History ==
The property lies on the traditional lands of the Arabana people. A creek after which the property took its name, was given the name "Anna Creek" by Peter Warburton in 1858, after a daughter of pastoralist John Chambers.

In January 1863, Julius Jeffreys, John Warren, and William Bakewell purchased the lease, and established the homestead at Strangways Springs. There was serious drought between 1864 and 1866, when the property was stocked with 7,300 sheep. Owing to constant attacks by dingoes, the owners switched to farming cattle instead.

In 1872, the station relocated to its current location. John Hogarth managed the property until 1893, when his younger brother Thomas took over. In 1913 George Warren became manager for a year, followed by his younger brother, Francis. In 1918 the lease was sold in 1918 to Malcolm Reid and Leslie Taylor.

In 1935, Kidman Holdings, which had acquired Stuart Creek Station in 1919 and The Peake Station in 1902, bought Anna Creek Station, which became the headquarters of the whole pastoral block. The McLean and Nunn families managed the properties together, in a partnership that lasted until 2016.

In 2012, a Federal Court determination gave the Arabana people native title to over 68,000 km^{2} (26,000 sq mi), including Anna Creek and other pastoral leases, along with Lake Eyre. The claim had been lodged on 16 January 1998 by Arabana elder Reg Dodd, and included Elliot Price Conservation Park, Kati Thanda–Lake Eyre National Park, and Wabma Kadarbu Mound Springs Conservation Park, along with the towns of Marree, William Creek, and Oodnadatta.

The land occupying the extent of the Anna Creek Station pastoral lease was gazetted as a locality by the Government of South Australia on 26 April 2013 with the name "Anna Creek".

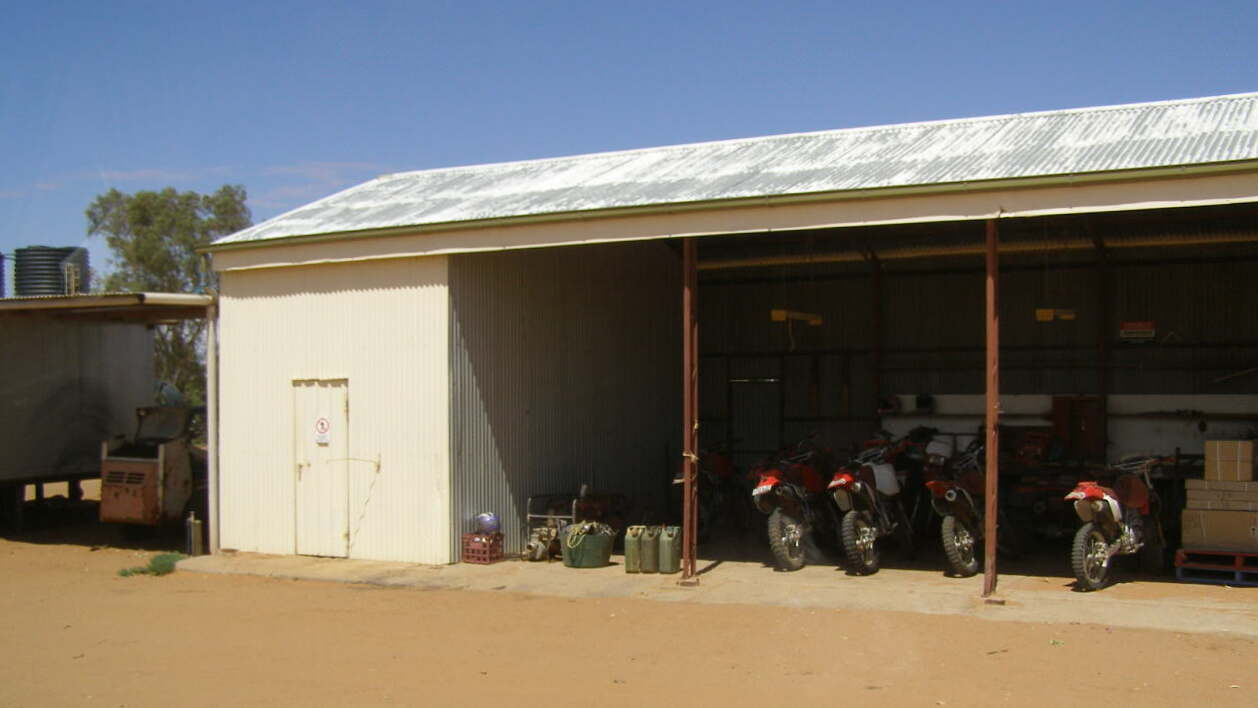
Trail bikes used for mustering, Anna Creek main homestead

In mid-April 2016, it was announced that the South Australian cattle company Williams Cattle Company was to acquire Anna Creek from S. Kidman & Co, subject to approval by the Foreign Investment Review Board of the sale of the remainder of the Kidman holding to a consortium led by the Chinese group Dakang Australia Holdings. Federal Treasurer Scott Morrison blocked the sale later that month, in the national interest. Anna Creek is located in a weapons testing range. Morrison had previously blocked the sale of Kidman to related Chinese company, Pengxin Group.

In December 2016, Anna Creek was finally sold to the South Australian family business Williams Cattle Company, at an estimated $16 million, while the rest of the Kidman empire was sold to a consortium comprising mining magnate Gina Rinehart's Hancock Prospecting, owning 67%, and the Chinese company Shanghai CRED, owning 33%. With this purchase, Williams Cattle Co. doubled their total area held under pastoral leases. The Williams family planned to invest heavily in new water facilities and trucking yards in order to facilitate an increase in the number of stock carried on the station. As of October 2025 it is still in their hands.

In October 2025, it was alleged that the owners had built illegal dams on rivers and waterholes on the property between 2017 and 2025, including a dam wall around 2 km (1.2 mi) long across Balta-Baltana Creek. The earthworks contravened the Aboriginal Heritage Act, the Natural Resources Management Act and the Landscape South Australia Act. The Arabana Corporation are the native title holders of the land, and the native title, among other things, had given the Arabana people the right "to share and exchange the subsistence and other traditional resources [and] to use the natural water resources of the determination area".

== Description ==
Anna Creek Station (including its outstation, The Peake Station) has an area of 23,876 km^{2} (9,219 sq mi; 5,900,000 acres), making it the biggest in the world. It is 8,000 km^{2} (2,000,000 acres; 3,100 sq mi) larger than its nearest rival, Alexandria Station in the country's Northern Territory. It is over seven times the size of the United States' biggest ranch, King Ranch in Texas, which is 3,340 km^{2} (830,000 acres; 1,290 sq mi).

The nearest township is William Creek (which is surrounded by the Anna Creek station), but the nearest town for freight is Coober Pedy.

The station is arid pastoral country; the annual rainfall is cited on the website as 140 mm (5.5 in).

== Buildings and communications ==
There is a main homestead at Anna Creek and an outstation at The Peake. Although the homestead is very isolated, they have satellite telecommunications including television and internet. As of 2006 the Coober Pedy Oodnadatta One Day Mail Run delivered mail twice a week and can bring a small amount of freight.

Once there was a large workforce of stockmen at Anna Creek, who mustered the cattle on horses. Today light aircraft are used for spotting animals which are rounded up by stockmen riding motorbikes, requiring a much smaller workforce.

=== Heritage-listed buildings ===
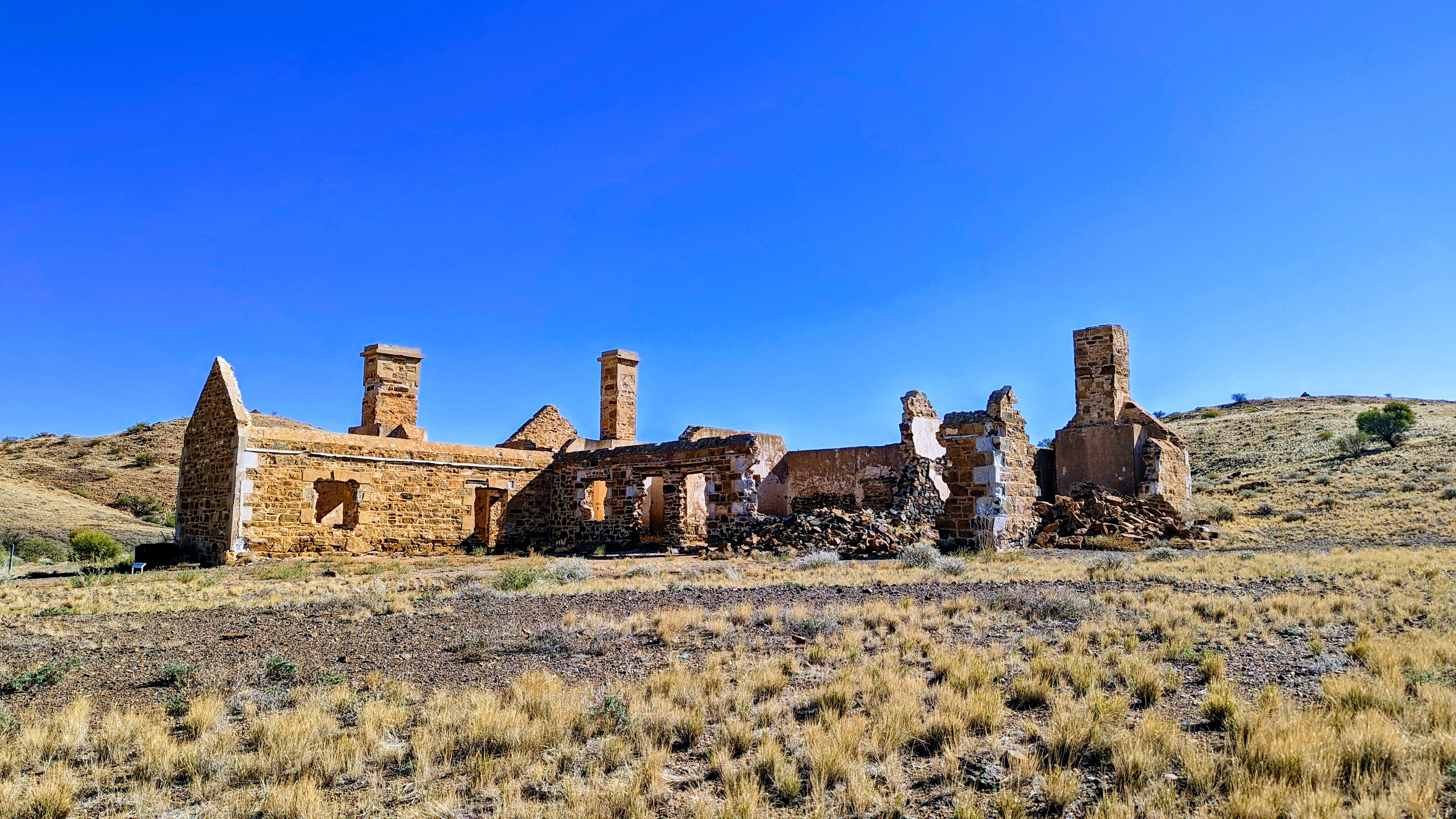
The Peake Telegraph Station ruins

The Peake ruins, including those of a former telegraph office, cemetery, mine site, and lime kilns at the outstation are listed on the South Australian Heritage Register.

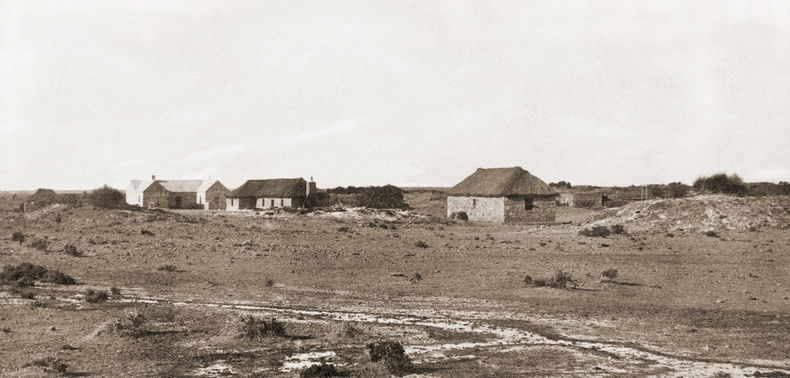
Strangways Springs telegraph station ruins

The Strangways Springs Telegraph Station ruins on the station are also listed on the Heritage Register.

== Stock numbers in the 2000s ==
Despite its size, in 2007 Anna Creek Station was carrying only 1,500 head of cattle due to the 2000s drought. In 2008, when the station was owned by S. Kidman and Co Ltd, there were eight full-time staff and they were destocking all their cattle. Following floods in 2010, conditions improved and the station restocked. It had 10,000 head of cattle in May 2011 and is capable of carrying up to 16,500 head of cattle during a good season. As of March 2025 the number of cattle on the station is reported as 17,000.

They raise Santa Gertrudis cattle as they are suitable for hot, dry climates.

Date	Cattle	Staff	Source
September 2002	16,000	?	
May 2003	16,500	19	
July 2005	13,000	?	
November 2006	4,000	?	
June 2008	1,500	8	
May 2011	11,000	?	
August 2012	17,000	17	
November 2020	9,500	Up to 11	
March 2025	17,000	Up to 11	

== See also ==
- List of ranches and stations
- List of the largest stations in Australia
