= William Mills (surveyor) =

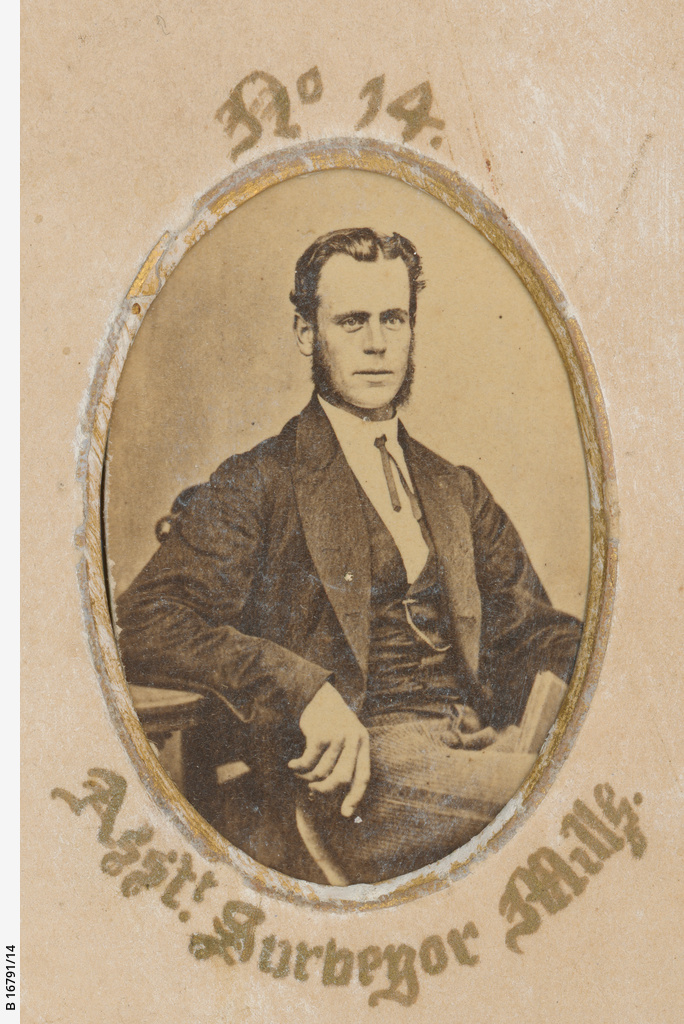
- W. W. Mills

Personal details
- Born: William Whitfield Mills; 19 November 1844 Plymouth, England
- Died: 18 September 1916 (aged 71) Widgiemooltha, Western Australia
- Spouse: Mary Jane Mullen
- Children: Alice Thornton, Ethel May
- Occupation: Surveyor

William Whitfield Mills (19 November 1844 – 18 August 1916) was an English surveyor of the Australian Overland Telegraph Line who is best known for naming a waterhole in Central Australia Alice Spring, from which the town of Alice Springs now takes its name. He also named Heavitree Gap as a tribute to his old school in Devon, England.

== Early life ==
Mills was born on 19 November 1844 at Plymouth in England. He went to school at Heavitree School in Devon. Mills immigrated to Australia on board the Atlanta from England, arriving in South Australia on 8 April 1866 at the age of 21.

== Goyder's Expedition ==
Mills was a surveyor on George Goyder's mission to survey a northern capital Palmerston, later renamed Darwin. He arrived on the Moonta on 5 February 1869 leaving just short of a year later, the team having surveyed more than 2700 square kilometres of land.

== Surveying the Overland Telegraph Line ==
On 5 September 1870, he joined Charles Todd's party to build the central section of the Overland Telegraph Line. On 7 March 1871, Mills and his companion Gilbert McMinn, having found a gap in the McDonnell Ranges through which to feed the telegraph line, and which he named Heavitree Gap, then came across a string of waterholes along what is now called the Todd River, which were already frequented by local Arrernte people. Mills named one Alice Spring, after the wife of Charles Todd, from which the town of Alice Springs now takes its name.

== Later life ==
Mills married Mary Jane Mullen on 24 March 1879. They had two daughters Alice Thornton and Ethel May.

After completion of the telegraph line, Mills returned to the Northern Territory to work in mining and undertake further surveying. In the early 1880s, he managed a camel transport company carrying freight from Farina to Peake and Charlotte Waters. He delivered 30 camels from Beltana Station to Northampton in Western Australia for Sir Thomas Elder. He went across the centre of Australia on the Canning Stock Route before heading to Northampton. They went for long periods without water but after 25 weeks, completed the journey.

Mary Jane died on 1 October 1888 at just 30 years of age. The Mills children were then brought up by extended family, while Mills spent time in Broken Hill before eventually moving to Western Australia.

Mills died on 18 August 1916 at the age of 72. He is buried in the Widgiemooltha Cemetery in Western Australia.

Mills Street in East Side in Alice Springs is named after Mills.
