= Wabma Kadarbu Mound Springs Conservation Park =

Protected area in South Australia

- IUCN category III (natural monument or feature)
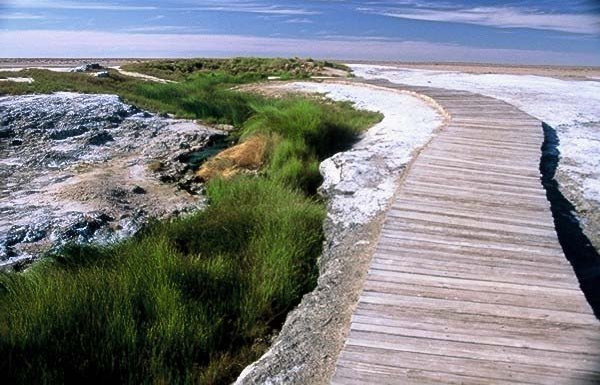
- Mound Spring, South Australia

- Location within South Australia
- Location: South Australia, Stuarts Creek
- Nearest city: Marree
- Coordinates: 29°27′36″S 136°54′44.99″E
- Area: 120.16 km^{2} (46.39 sq mi)
- Established: 18 July 1996
- Visitors: 12,000 - 19,000 (in 2012)
- Governing body: Arabana aboriginal people Department for Environment and Water

Wabma Kadarbu Mound Springs Conservation Park is a protected area in the Australian state of South Australia. It is located in Stuarts Creek, about 130 kilometres (81 miles) north of the town of Marree via the Oodnadatta Track in the state's Far North. The conservation park was proclaimed under the National Parks and Wildlife Act 1972 in 1996. As of 2012, it is subject to a co-management agreement between the Arabana aboriginal people and the Department for Environment and Water.

The name of the conservation park is derived from the Arabana language name used for the local feature also known as Hamilton Hill (also as Mount Hamilton) meaning "snake's head" in reference to the profile of Hamilton Hill.

The conservation park protects both a network of mound springs that upwell from the Great Artesian Basin and the "ruins of a fettler’s cottage at the old Margaret Rail Siding". Notable mound spring sites within the conservation park include "Pitha - Kurnti - Kurnti" at Coward Springs, "Thirrka" (also known as "Blanche Cup"), "Pirdali–nha" (also known as "The Bubbler"), and "Wabma Kadarbu" at Hamilton Hill. As of 2012, facilities within the conservation park include car parks at each spring, boardwalks, viewing platforms, and interpretive signage. The conservation park is classified as an IUCN Category III protected area.

== See also ==
- Protected areas of South Australia
