= Australian Overland Telegraph Line =

Major Darwin-Port Augusta telecom link

Coordinates: 25°55′37.77″S 134°58′25.58″E

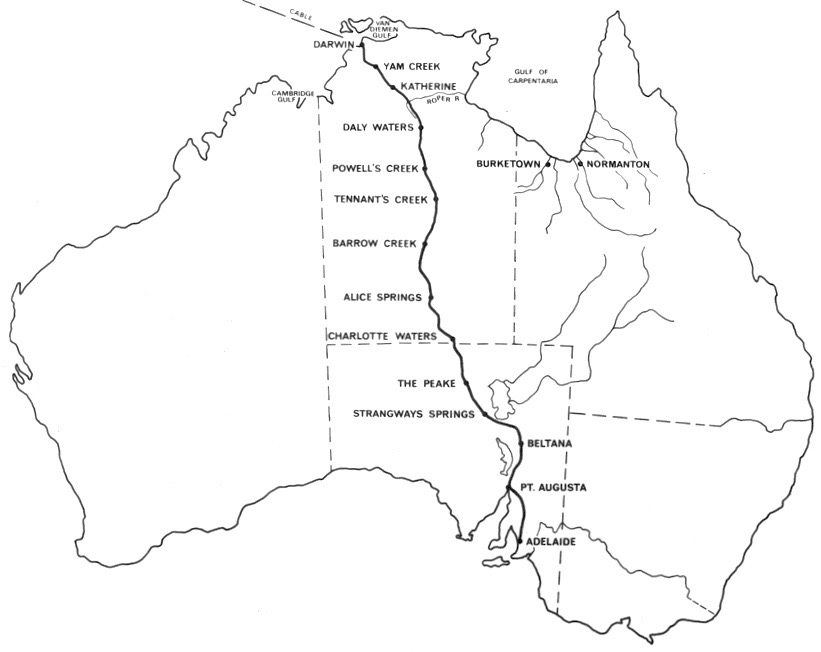
Water sources known to Aboriginal people largely determined the route of the Overland Telegraph Line through the dry interior of Australia and, decades later, the [former] Central Australia Railway

The Australian Overland Telegraph Line was an electrical telegraph system for sending messages the 3200 kilometres (2000 miles) between Darwin, in what is now the Northern Territory of Australia, and Adelaide, the capital of South Australia. Completed in 1872 (with a line to Western Australia added in 1877), it allowed fast communication between Australia and the rest of the world. When it was linked to the Java-to-Darwin submarine telegraph cable several months later, the communication time with Europe dropped from months to hours; Australia was no longer so isolated from the rest of the world. The line was one of the great engineering feats of 19th-century Australia and probably the most significant milestone in the history of telegraphy in Australia.

== Conception and competition ==
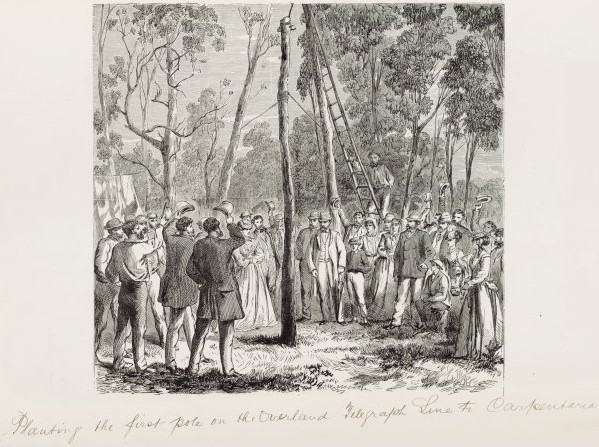
Planting the first pole on the Overland Telegraph line to Carpentaria

By 1855 speculation had intensified about possible routes for the connection of Australia to the new telegraph cable in Java and thus Europe. Among the routes under consideration were either Ceylon to Albany in Western Australia, or Java to the north coast of Australia and then either onto east coast, or south through the centre of the continent to Adelaide.

Competition between the colonies over the route was fierce. The Victorian government organised an expedition led by Burke and Wills to cross the continent from Menindee to the Gulf of Carpentaria in 1860. Although the route was traversed, the expedition ended in disaster. The South Australian government recognised the economic benefits that would result from becoming the centre of the telegraph network. It offered a reward of £2000 to encourage an expedition to find a route between South Australia and the north coast.

John McDouall Stuart had meanwhile also been endeavouring to cross the continent starting from the northern Flinders Ranges, and was successful on his sixth attempt in 1862. Stuart had the proposed telegraph line in mind as he travelled across the country, noting the best places for river crossings, sources of timber for telegraph poles, and water supplies. On 24 July, his expedition finally reached the north coast at a place Stuart named Chambers Bay, after his early sponsor, James Chambers. South Australian Governor Richard MacDonnell gave his strong support to the project.

In 1863 an Order in Council transferred the Northern Territory to South Australia, aiming to secure land for an international telegraph connection. Now with a potential route, South Australia strengthened its position for the telegraph line in 1865 when Parliament authorised the construction of a telegraph line between Adelaide and Port Augusta, 300 km to the north. This move provoked outrage in Queensland among advocates of the Darwin–Burketown route.

The final contract was secured in 1870 when the South Australian government agreed to construct 3200 km of line to Darwin, while the British-Australian Telegraph Company promised to lay the undersea cable from Banyuwangi, Java to Darwin. The latter was to be finished on 31 December 1871, and severe penalties were to apply if the connecting link was not ready.

== Construction ==
The South Australian Superintendent of Telegraphs, Charles Todd, was appointed head of the project, and devised a timetable to complete the immense project on schedule. Todd had built South Australia's first telegraph line and extended it to Melbourne. The contract stipulated a total cost of no more than £128,000 and two years' construction time. He divided the route into three sections, each of 600 miles (970 km): northern and southern sections to be handled by private contractors, and a central section which would be constructed by his own department. The telegraph line would comprise more than 30,000 wrought iron poles, insulators, batteries, wire and other equipment, ordered from England. The poles were placed 80 m apart and repeater stations separated by no more than 250 km, a major criterion being year-round availability of water.

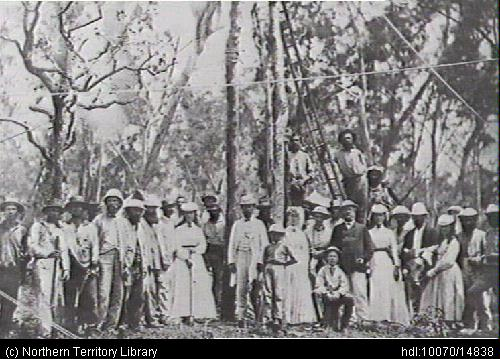
Planting the first telegraph pole, near Palmerston (Darwin) in September 1870.

Todd appointed staff to whom the contractors would be responsible: Explorer, John Ross; Surveyor, William Harvey; Overseer of Works, Northern Territory, William McMinn; Sub-Overseer, R. C. Burton; Operators, James Lawrence Stapleton (murdered 1874 at Barrow Creek), and Andrew Howley. Surveyors and Overseers, central portion of line: A. T. Woods, Gilbert McMinn, and Richard Randall Knuckey; Overseer, James Beckwith; Sub-Overseers, J. F. Roberts (perhaps J. Le M. F. Roberts), Stephen Jarvis, W. W. Mills, W. Charles Musgrave, and Christopher Giles. He assembled a team of men for his central section: surveyors, linesmen, carpenters, labourers, and cooks. The team left Adelaide with horses, bullocks, and carts loaded with provisions and equipment for many weeks. The central section would be surveyed by the explorer John Ross and Alfred Giles, his second-in-command.

The southern section from Port Augusta to Alberga Creek was contracted to Edward Meade Bagot. He contracted Benjamin Herschel Babbage to survey the line, and sites at Beltana, Strangways Springs, and the Peake were identified as sites for repeater stations. Charlotte Waters, just north of the South Australian border in the Northern Territory, was surveyed in 1871 by Gilbert McMinn and Richard Knuckey and a repeater station built in 1872.

Darwent & Dalwood, who won the contract for the northern section of 600 miles (970 km), arrived in Port Darwin aboard SS Omeo in September 1870 with 80 men, 80 draught horses, bullocks, equipment, and stores. Stephen King Jr. was their surveyor and explorer. The northern line was progressing well until the onset of the wet season in November 1870. Heavy rain of up to 10 inches (250 mm) a day waterlogged the ground and made it impossible for work to progress. With conditions worsening, the men went on strike on 7 March 1871, rancid food, and disease-spreading mosquitoes among their complaints. On 3 May 1871, Overseer of Works William McMinn cancelled Darwent & Dalwood's contract and sent all the workers back to Adelaide, on the basis of insufficient progress (they had erected poles to a distance of 225 miles (362 km) and strung wire for 129 miles (208 km) to that date) and the insurrection of the men. This last, the workers claimed, was exaggerated; they only refused to work after they had been sacked. These actions were certainly within his powers, and spelled out in the contract, but he was dismissed on his return to Adelaide in July 1871. Joseph Darwent had protested the original appointment of McMinn, who had submitted a losing tender, but was overruled. William T. Dalwood was eventually awarded compensation of £11,000.

The South Australian Government was now forced to construct an extra 700 km of line, and threw every available resource into its completion, down to purchasing horses and hiring men from New South Wales. It was another six months before reinforcements led by engineer Robert C. Patterson arrived in Darwin. As the central and southern sections neared completion, Patterson decided to take a different strategy with the construction of the northern section. It was divided into four sub-sections with the majority of the men on the most northerly section. The undersea cable was finished earlier than expected, with the line from Java reaching Darwin on 18 November 1871 and being connected the following day.

Because of the problems still facing the northern section, the Queensland Superintendent of Telegraphs called for the abandonment of the project, and for the line to connect to the terminal at Burketown, but Todd was adamant and pressed on. By the end of the year there was still over 300 km of line to erect. A storm system impacting South and Central Australia caused significant interruptions on the line in January 1872. By May 1872, the line was substantially in use with horse or camel carrying messages across the uncompleted section. During this time, Todd began visiting workers along the line to lift their spirits. The message he sent along the incomplete line on 22 May 1872, took 9 days to reach Adelaide.

== Completion ==
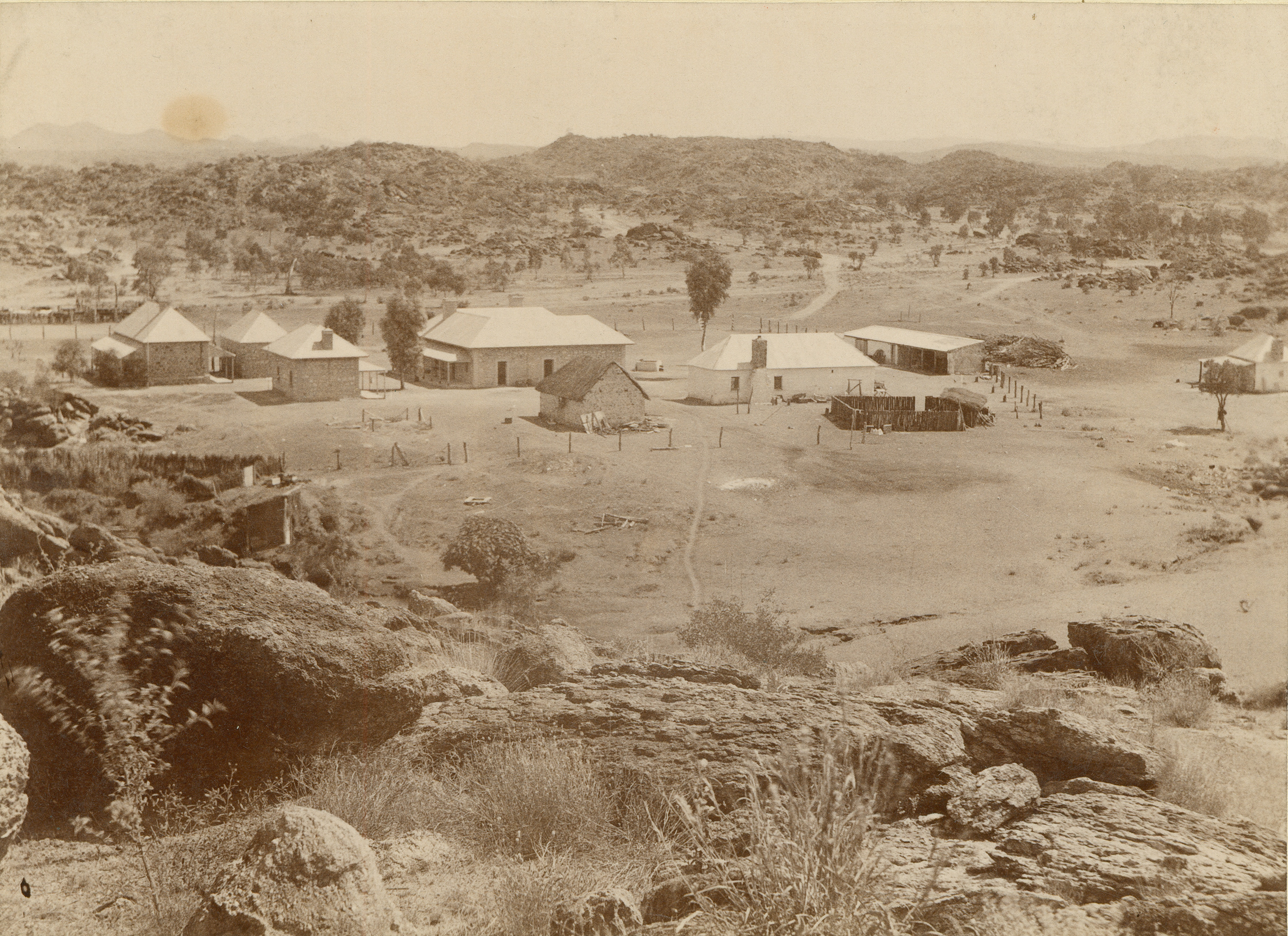
Repeater station at Alice Springs, c. 1880

Running more than seven months behind schedule, the two lines were finally joined at Frew's Ponds on Thursday, 22 August 1872. Todd was given the honour of sending the first message along the completed line:

WE HAVE THIS DAY, WITHIN TWO YEARS, COMPLETED A LINE OF COMMUNICATIONS TWO THOUSAND MILES LONG THROUGH THE VERY CENTRE OF AUSTRALIA, UNTIL A FEW YEARS AGO A TERRA INCOGNITA BELIEVED TO BE A DESERT +++

After the first messages had been exchanged over the new line, Todd was accompanied by surveyor Richard Randall Knuckey on the return journey from Central Mount Stuart to Adelaide.

== Running the Overland Telegraph Line ==
The requirements of nineteenth century telegraphy meant the Overland Telegraph Line required repeater stations, a maximum of 250–300 km apart, to boost the signal. The repeater stations contained two primary batteries: the line was powered by a (c. 120 V) bank of Meidinger cells — a variation of Daniell cell, "recharged" by replacing the electrolyte — as well as Leclanche cells for the local equipment. Although repeater stations have been run by a single telegraphist, usual staffing was four to six, including a station master, telegraphists, and a linesman. The job of a telegraphist was to record each message received, with the time of day, and to re-send (relay) it further along the line.

Within the first year of operations 4000 telegrams were transmitted. Maintenance was an ongoing and mammoth task, with floods often destroying poles, and a range of other incidents disrupting the line. In the 1880s, wooden poles were replaced with Joseph Oppenheimer's patented telescoping poles.

The line proved an immediate success in opening the Northern Territory; gold discoveries were made in several places along the northern section (in particular Pine Creek), and the repeater stations in the MacDonnell Ranges proved invaluable starting points for explorers like Ernest Giles, W. C. Gosse, and Peter Egerton-Warburton who were heading west.

In February 1875, a small contingent of Overland Telegraph employees left Port Darwin for Adelaide on the ill-fated SS Gothenburg. A few days later, at least ten were among the hundred-odd who lost their lives after she encountered a severe storm, and was driven into the Great Barrier Reef and sank.

=== A chain of repeater stations ===
The southern section of the line included repeater stations at Beltana, Strangways Springs, and the Peake. Traces and remains of these repeater stations can still be seen today along the Oodnadatta Track in South Australia.

The central section of the line included repeater stations at Charlotte Waters and Alice Springs. Charlotte Waters was operational until the 1930s; today there is very little left at the site.

The northern section of the line included repeater stations at Barrow Creek, Tennant Creek, Daly Waters, Powell Creek, Katherine, Yam Creek, and finally a terminus point in Darwin. In Darwin, there was also considerable infrastructure to manage and maintain the undersea cable/s to Europe.

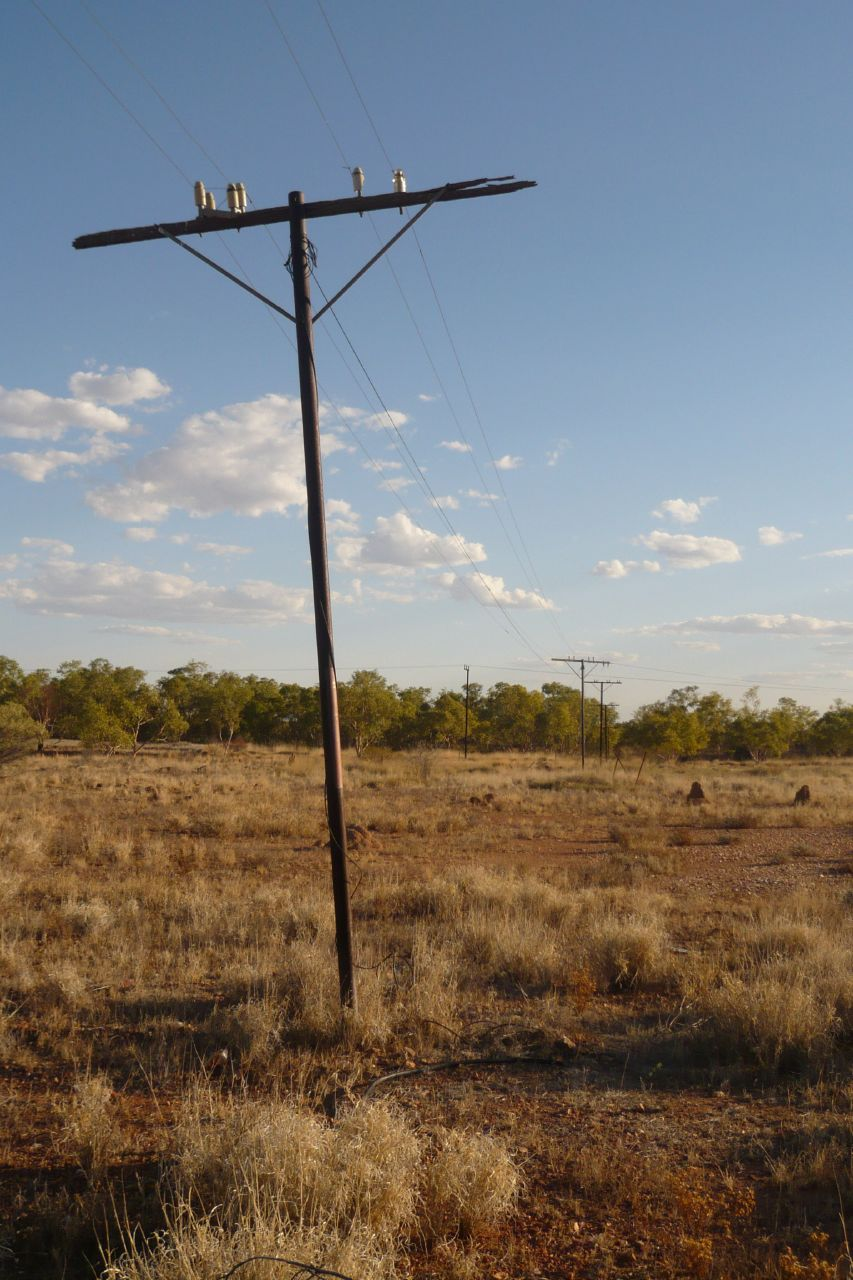
Remains of the Overland Telegraph line at Tennant Creek converted into telephone circuits.

Telegraph station February 1895	Distance from Adelaide	Distance from previous
Port Darwin	1,973 mi (3,175 km)	24 mi (39 km)
Southport	1,949 mi (3,137 km)	95 mi (153 km)
Yam Creek	1,854 mi (2,984 km)	29 mi (47 km)
Pine Creek	1,825 mi (2,937 km)	54 mi (87 km)
Katharine	1,771 mi (2,850 km)	166 mi (267 km)
Daly Waters	1,605 mi (2,583 km)	138 mi (222 km)
Powell Creek	1,467 mi (2,361 km)	113 mi (182 km)
Tennant Creek	1,354 mi (2,179 km)	147 mi (237 km)
Barrow Creek	1,207 mi (1,942 km)	171 mi (275 km)
Alice Springs	1,036 mi (1,667 km)	132 mi (212 km)
Charlotte Waters	804 mi (1,294 km)	168 mi (270 km)
The Peake	636 mi (1,024 km)	91 mi (146 km)
Strangways Springs	545 mi (877 km)	90 mi (140 km)
Beltana	355 mi (571 km)	c. 150 mi (240 km)
Port Augusta	c. 205 mi (330 km)	

=== A major break ===
Numerous interruptions to service occurred in the early days. Tribal Aboriginals discovered that splendid fishing hooks could be fashioned from the galvanised iron wire conductors (same as #8 fencing wire), spearheads, and other implements could be made from shards of insulator, and hatchets from iron baseplates attached to some of the poles, keeping the linemen busy. Atmospheric disturbance from solar flares induced interfering signals in some sections of the line, and lightning strikes were not uncommon.

These breaks were as nothing compared with the flooding event involving the Peake and Strangways Springs stations in 1895. On 20 January the telegraph line was washed away by the Warrina Creek, a few miles north of Strangways Springs, and full service was not restored until 24 January. Improvised communication included carrying paper copies of the messages by rail between the Peake and Oodnadatta. The flood at the Peake was unprecedented, but Todd authorised replacing the 23 ft (7.0 m) steel poles with 30-footers, set in concrete and reinforced with struts.

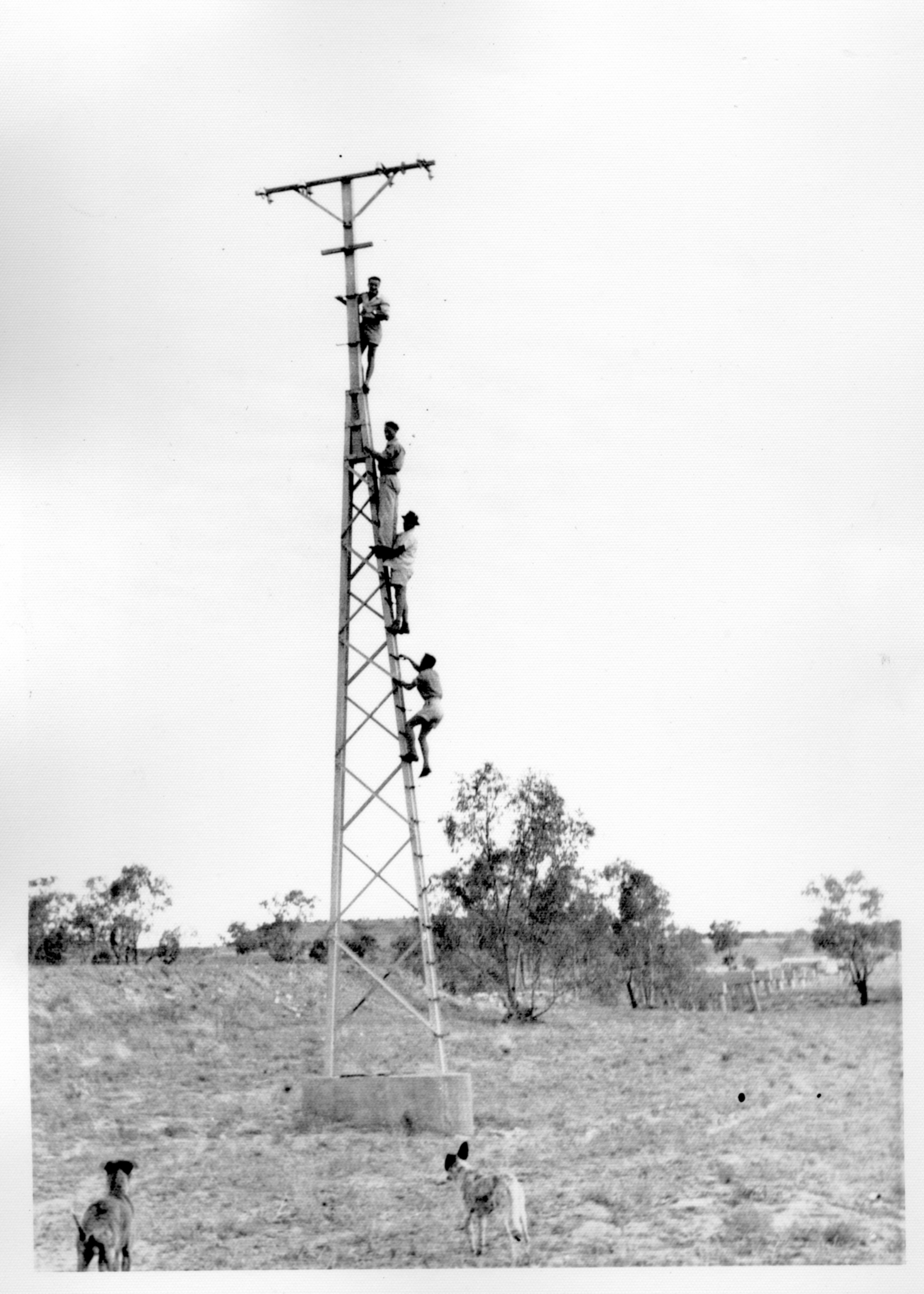
PMG workers maintaining the line in the 1950s

=== Decommissioning the line ===
When Darwin was bombed in World War II the line was deliberately cut just before the attack.

The line was replaced in the early 1970s by a chain of microwave radio relays through Mount Isa.

In 2008, its engineering heritage was recognised by the installation of markers provided by the Engineers Australia's Engineering Heritage Recognition Program at a location in Darwin near the place where the cable reached the shore, the Alice Springs Telegraph Station, and the General Post Office in Adelaide.

== Connecting the Overland Telegraph Line to the rest of the world ==
In 1870 the British Australia Telegraph Company (BAT) was formed to link Australia directly to the British telegraphic cable system, by extending the cable from Singapore via Java to Port Darwin. In 1873, three British companies, The British India Extension Telegraph Company, The BAT, and The China Submarine Telegraph Company were amalgamated to form the Eastern Extension, Australasia and China Telegraph Company (EET Co). The driving force behind the British cable companies was a Scottish born entrepreneur Sir John Pender, founder of Cable and Wireless.

On 19 November 1871, Australia was connected telegraphically with the rest of the world after a cable was laid by BAT from Banyuwangi (Banjoewangie), at the eastern end of Java, to Darwin. This coincided with the completion of the construction of the overland telegraph cable from Adelaide to Darwin. The first message sent directly from London to Adelaide occurred on 22 October 1872. A second redundant submarine cable from Java to Darwin was laid in 1880. The site in the intertidal zone where the cables come ashore in Darwin, where they are still visible during very low tides, was heritage listed in 2020.

=== A back-up cable to Western Australia ===
On 9 April 1889 a third undersea telegraph cable opened for business, running from Banyuwangi, Java to Cable Beach, Western Australia, and continuing overland to Perth, to complement the two cables already laid in 1871 and 1880 from Banyuwangi to Darwin.

This cable was laid to increase security in communications by avoiding disruption from seismic activity that kept breaking the Banyuwangi to Darwin cables. The contract for the cables called for the manufacture of 970 nautical miles of cable containing a single galvanised copper core with 220 nautical miles being brass sheathed, laid by the Telegraph Construction and Maintenance Company for the Eastern Extension, Australasia and China Telegraph Company, by the SS Seine. The operation took only 10 days and was completed on 26 February 1889. These were all British companies.

Cable Beach is named after this cable that connected Java to Cable Station, that served this purpose until March 1914. After operating for 25 years it closed due to the opening of more competitive, cheaper-to-run stations; most cables were subsequently recovered.

Cable Station was left empty, and in 1921 it was purchased and transformed into its current use as the Broome Court House, which was placed on the Western Australian State Register of Heritage Places in 2001 as it is the only station that is still standing in Australia.

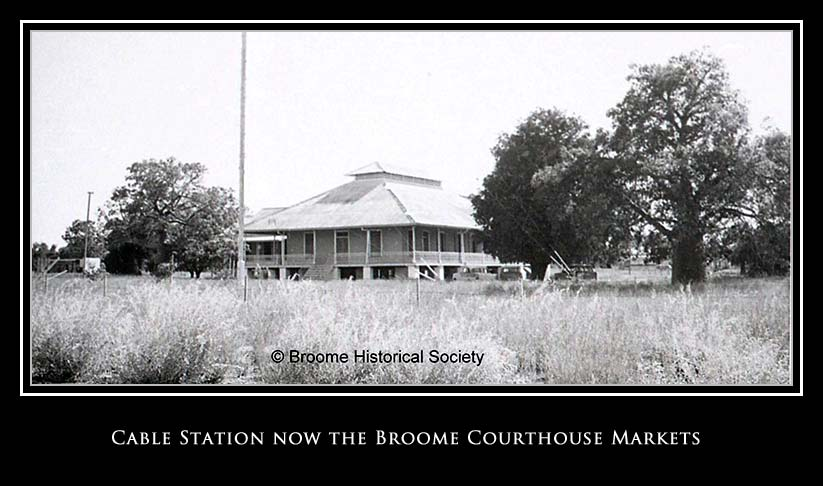
The original cable station, Broome, Western Australia

== Films and TV shows ==
In the 1930s Cinesound Productions announced plans to make a movie about the Telegraph based on a script by Frank Clune. This emerged as Clune's 1955 book Overland Telegraph. The film was never made.

In 2007, the ABC produced Constructing Australia, a three-part miniseries, which included the 55-minute "Wire through the Heart" on the Overland Telegraph Line. A 6-minute excerpt, "Todd Completes Telegraph" may be viewed on this project page from the NFSA.

== See also ==
- First transcontinental telegraph line across the western United States, completed in 1861
- History of telegraphy in Australia
