= Bidjara =

Bidjara or Pitjara or Bidyara may refer to:

- Bidjara (Warrego River), also spelt Pitjara, an Aboriginal people of eastern Queensland
  - Bidjara language
- Bidjara (Bulloo River), also spelt Bitjara and Bithara, an Aboriginal people of south-western Queensland
  - Bidjara language (Ngura)

== See also ==
- Badjiri, also spelt Budjari, an Aboriginal people of southern Queensland, close to the Paroo River and the southern border
  - Badjiri language
