= Wanggumara =

Aboriginal Australian people

The Wanggumara, also spelt Wangkumara, Wongkumara, Wangkumarra, and other variants, are an Aboriginal people of the state of Queensland, Australia.

== Language ==
Old Wankumara, spoken along the Bulloo River with the Kalali people, was a "Karna–Mari fringe" language that died out with the passing of its last speakers in the late 20th century. "Modern" Wankumara, spoken along the Wilson River, is a Karnic language, which according to Breen (1967) was identical to the speech of other peoples speaking the Wilson River language. The disambiguator "modern" simply refers to the fact that the Wanggumara people continued speaking that language more recently than the other.

== Country ==
According to Norman Tindale, the Wanggumara lands covered some 4,500 square miles (12,000 km^{2}), stretching over Cooper Creek east of Nappa Merrie and Orientos to the area around the ephemeral Wilson River at Nockatunga.

Writing in 1886, F. W. Myles described their neighbouring tribes as follows:

The names of the tribes which adjoin the Wonkomarra are, to the south, the Poidgerry (on the Currowinya Downs station) and the Bitharra (on the Bulloo Downs station); to the west, the Thiralla (on the Nockatoongo station) and Eromarra (on the Conbar station); to the north, the Bunthomarra (on the Mount Margaret station) and the Murgoin (on the Ardock station); and on the east by the same tribe (on the Dynevor station).

== History of contact ==
The first settlers arrived in 1863, and within two decades their population had been reduced substantially to just 90 people. Those surviving moved to Chastleton (former name of Nappa Merrie Station) and Narcowlah where they mingled with the Kalali.

== Social organisation ==
The Wanggumara were divided into hordes, concerning which two names possibly referring to their clans survive:

- Balpamadramadra (perhaps a clan at Nappa Merrie)
- Jaramarala (perhaps a clan at Baryulah)

== Alternative names ==
- Wangkumara, Wonkamara, Wonkomarra, Wonkamarra, Wonkamura, Wonkamurra
- Wonkubara, Wanggumara
- Papagunu (derogatory Yandruwandha exonym name, signifying "dog shit")
- Balpamadramadra
- Jaramarala

== Some words ==
- mari (dog, whether wild or tame)
- wanyu (father)
- unu (mother)
- doona (white man, meaning properly "ghost")

== Sources ==
- Mathews, R. H. (1899). "Divisions of some Aboriginal Tribes, Queensland". Proceedings of the Royal Society of New South Wales. 33: 108–111. doi:10.5962/p.359316. S2CID 259699375. Archived from the original on 25 November 2021.
- Mathews, R. H. (January 1900). "Divisions of the South Australian Aborigines". Proceedings of the American Philosophical Society. 39 (161): 78–91+93. JSTOR 983545.
- Mathews, R. H. (1905). "Ethnological notes on the aboriginal tribes of Queensland" (PDF). Queensland Geographical Journal. 29: 49–75.
- Myles, F. W. (1886). "Thargominda, Bulloo River" (PDF). In Curr, Edward Micklethwaite (ed.). The Australian race: its origin, languages, customs, place of landing in Australia and the routes by which it spread itself over the continent. Vol. 2. Melbourne: J. Ferres. pp. 36–41.
- Tindale, Norman Barnett (1974). "Wongkumara (QLD)". Aboriginal Tribes of Australia: Their Terrain, Environmental Controls, Distribution, Limits, and Proper Names. Australian National University Press. Archived from the original on 26 December 2017.
