= Galali =

Galali may refer to:

== People and languages ==
- Galali people, an Indigenous Australian people in Queensland
  - Kalali language or Galali, a variety of the Bulloo River language
  - Galali, a variety of the Wilson River language

== Places ==
- Galali, Bahrain, an area of Muharraq Island
- Gelali (disambiguation), several places in Iran also known as Galali
