= Gelali =

Gelali or Golali or Galali (Persian: گلالي) may refer to:

- Gelali, Kermanshah
- Golali, Kuzaran, Kermanshah Province
- Gelali-ye Jadid, Kermanshah Province
- Galali, Kurdistan
- Golali, Zanjan
