= Ngura languages =

Extinct Australian Aboriginal language group

Ngura
- Ngurawarla
- (spurious?)
- Geographic distribution: Northwest New South Wales, southwest Queensland, Australia
- Ethnicity: various (Wongkumara, Ngandangara, Punthamara, Kalali, ?Bidjara, ??Thereila, Karendala, Ngurawola, etc.)
- Linguistic classification: Pama–Nyungan; some languages may be Karnic, some Maric, some unclassified or spurious
- Subdivisions: Bulloo River language (Karna–Mari 'fringe'); Wilson River language (Karnic); Badjiri (Maric?); + unattested varieties and spurious names

Language codes
- ISO 639-3: (nbx split in 2013)
- Glottolog: ngur1261 (Wilson River (Grey Range))

Ngura is a disputed and possibly spurious ethnic and language designation of central Australia. The name 'Nura', short for Ngurawarla, means 'empty camp', referring to lands abandoned after a massacre. It is not a language or ethnic designation.

Of the various language varieties that have gone by this name, all of which are extinct, Bowern (2001) classifies the Wilson River language of the 'modern' Galali/Garlali and Wangkumara-plus-Bundhamara/Punthamara (also known as or closely related to Ngandangara/Yarumarra) peoples as an Eastern Karnic language, while the Bulloo River language of the 'old' Garlali and Wangkumara remains an unclassified Karna–Mari 'fringe' language. Bidjara or less ambiguously 'Bitharra' (not to be confused with the Bidjara language of the Maric languages) may be another variety of Bulloo River, but there is not enough data to be sure. Bowern believes that Badjiri was probably a Maric language. Bowern (2001) said the data is too sketchy to be sure, but Bowern (2011) simply assigned it to Maric.

There seems to be enough data to establish three "Ngura" languages, which do not form a coherent group:

- The Bulloo River language (unclassified language of the Karna–Mari 'fringe'), including 'Old' Garlali and Wanggumara, plus possibly Bidjara (Bitharra) and Mingbari (Minkabari).
- The Wilson River language (East branch of the Karnic family), including 'modern' Garlali and Wanggumara, Punthamara (Bundhamara), Ngandangara, Yarumarra (Eromarra), Karenggapa and Gungadidji (Kungadutji). Mambangura / Dhiraila (Thereila) may also belong here.
- The Badjiri language (Maric family?)

In 2013, the old ISO code for 'Ngura', [nbx], was split, with new codes established for these languages, namely for (old?) Garlali, Punthamara, (old and modern?) Wangkumara and Badjiri. A fifth code, [ekc] (the 'Eastern Karnic' language, not to be confused with the 'Eastern Karnic' languages of Bowern, which are Wilson River), was assigned to those names that were too poorly attested to establish as actual language varieties. It was retired in 2020.

Besides those names covered above, there is no data associated with the name 'Garandala' (Karendala), apart from a few words of 'Kunandaburi' that may be Kungadutji (Wilson River).
