= Diyari =

Aboriginal Australian people

The Dieri (/ˈdɪəri/), alternatively transcribed as Diyari (/ˈdiːjɑːri/), is an Indigenous Australian group of the South Australian desert originating in and around the delta of Cooper Creek to the east of Lake Eyre.

== Language ==
Diyari is classified as one of the Karnic languages. Though earlier described in Ethnologue as extinct, and later "nearly extinct", Peter Austin has attested that the language still has fluent native speakers and hundreds of Dieri who retain some knowledge of it. Lutheran missionaries developed an orthography to transcribe the language, together with a German-Diyari dictionary, as early as 1893 and, as later modified by Johann Flierl, this was taught to many Diyari-speakers, who corresponded in the language from the 1880s down to the 1960s. Diyari was the first Aboriginal language for which a complete translation of the New Testament was made.

The Dieri also had a highly developed sign language, which was first noticed by Alfred William Howitt in 1891, who first mistook them for defiant or command gestures until he realised that they formed part of an integral system of hand signs, of which he registered 65. One of their functions was to allow women to communicate during mourning, when a speech taboo prevailed.

== Country ==
The traditional lands of the Dieri were estimated by Norman Tindale to have encompassed roughly 8,400 square miles (22,000 km^{2}), and lay in the delta of the Barcoo River (Cooper Creek) to the east of Lake Eyre. The southern boundary was marked by Mount Freeling, its most northern reach by the Pirigundi Lake, on the Cooper Creek. The most easterly edge was constituted by Lake Hope, and the western limits lay some 80 miles west of Lake Hope. (Note: " Cooper Creek between Killalapaninna and near Coongie; at Cowarie, Mulka, Lake Howitt, and Lake Hope; south to Lake Gregory and Clayton River and low country north of Mount Freeling." (Tindale 1974, p. 211)) Their neighbouring tribes were the Yandruwandha and Yawarrawarrka, respectively to their east and north-east and, to the north, the Ngameni. To their north-west were the Wangganguru, to their west the Thirrari and Arabana, while on the southern fringes were the Kuyani and Adnyamathanha.

The environment was harsh, and foraging for vegetables was a staple since the kangaroo was absent from their terrain and the emu, their favourite food, quite rare. Native rats, snakes and lizards were, however, abundant.

== Mythology ==
Lorimer Fison (1880):

After the creation, brothers, sisters, and others of the closest kin, intermarried promiscuously, until — the evil effects of these alliances becoming manifest — a council of the chiefs was assembled to consider in what way they might be averted, the result of their deliberations being a petition to the Muramura (Good Spirit), in answer to which he ordered that the tribe should be divided into branches, and distinguished one from another by different names, after objects animate and inanimate, such as dogs, mice, emu, rain, iguana, and so forth; the members of any such branch not to intermarry, but with permission for one branch to mingle with another. Thus, the son of a dog might not marry the daughter of a dog, but either might form an alliance with a mouse, rat, or other family. This custom is still observed, and the first question asked of a stranger is, "What murdoo?", i.e., "Of what family are you?". (Note: "In a communication received from the Rev. H. Vogelsang, of the Lutheran Mission, Kopperamana, during the preparation of this work for the press, he says — 'The question 'Minna murdu?' is connected with eating and with hospitality. For instance, when a stranger blackfellow arrives here, the question is, Minna murdu? – 'what are you?', Kangaroo, or Rat, or Mouse, or whatever else it may be. All those of the same name go to the same camp, eat together, live together, even lend each other their women.'" (Fison & Howitt 1880, p. 52, note))

The Dieri creation story imagined Mooramoora, the good spirit, making small black lizards at first, and delighted with them, they decided should hold sway over all other created beings. It was by remodulating this variety of lizard, cutting off the tail, and using his forefinger to create a nose, that man was created, and then divided into male and female. Mooramoora then had the Moon create all creatures. Man could not run down the fleet, tasty emu, and the deity was asked to make heat so that it would tire and allow men to catch up and trap it. Men were asked to perform certain ceremonies, considered obscene by Gason, and after their compliance, Mooramoora created the sun.

== History of contact ==
Lutheran missionaries established the Bethesda or Killalpaninna Mission among the Dieri in 1866. The first ethnographic reports regarding the Dieri were written by a police trooper, Samuel Gason (1845–1897) in 1874. He estimated the numbers of Aborigines in the Cooper Creek area at 1000-1200, of which the Dieri were the most prominent, with an estimated 230 members. By the end of World War II, they were estimated to number around 60.

== Kinship system ==
The Dieri foundational myths stated that originally man was incestuously promiscuous, fathers, mothers, sons and daughter all marrying each other. To overcome the strife that ensued, the Elders petitioned the Mooramoora creator for a solution, which consisted in splitting the tribe into distinct branches, each designated by an animal or natural name, and then disallow marriage among members of the same branch.

Before the white intrusion on their lands made its impact, the Dieri were divided into two tribal groups, the Ku'na:ri around Cooper Creek and the Pandu in proximity of Lake Hope.

Their kinship system was first studied by Howitt, who took it as exemplifying a form of one of the most socially backward of Australian tribes. Alfred Radcliffe-Brown analysed the Dieri kinship structure as a variant of the Arrernte system. Their moieties were Matharri and Kararrhu, in accordance with the general divisions among speakers of Thura-Yura languages in South Australia.

== Social system ==
Gason thought the Dieri extremely treacherous, nourished by suspicion from infancy. At the same time, he said they displayed exemplary hospitality, revered the aged, and adored their children. Any stranger who passed through their camp, was provided with food. Infanticide was widespread, by Gason's calculation, affecting some 30% of births and was performed by the mother. They were very attached to their camp dingos, treating them as they would a human.

== Native title ==
The Dieri Aboriginal Corporation incorporated in 2001 and by 2014 had 600 members living in Marree, Lyndhurst, Port Augusta, Whyalla and in Broken Hill in New South Wales. The group purchased the Marree Station property surrounding Marree in 2008. In May 2012 the Federal Court of Australia made a determination that recognised Dieri rights to 47,000 square kilometres (18,000 mi^{2}) of land along Cooper Creek, with boundaries extending to part of the Strzelecki Regional Reserve and the Lake Eyre National Park.

== Alternative names ==
- Diari, Diyeri, Dieyerie, Dieri
- Deerie, Dieyrie, Dayerrie
- Dthee-eri, Dickeri (misprint)
- Kunari (the native name for Cooper Creek)
- Koonarie
- Wongkadieri (Arabana exonym)
- Wonkadieri
- Ti:ari (Southern Aranda exonym)
- Urrominna (southern name not only for the Diyari, but also for the Kuyani)

== Some words ==
- kunki (man of high degree/clever man/medicine man)
- kutyi (malign spirit, devil)

== See also ==
- Adno-artina, a spirit that appears in Diyari stories
- Kadimakara, monsters in Diyari stories that have been associated with extinct megafauna

== Sources ==
- Austin, Peter (2004). "Diyari (Pama-Nyungan)". In Booij, G. E.; Lehmann, Christian; Mugdan, Joachim (eds.). Morphologie: Ein Internationales Handbuch Zur Flexion und Wortbildung. Vol. 2. Walter de Gruyter. pp. 1490–1500. ISBN 978-3-110-17278-2.
- Austin, Peter (2014). "And still they speak Diyari: the life history of an endangered language" (PDF). Ethnorema. 10: 1–17.
- Bauer, Laurie (2007). The Linguistics Student's Handbook. Edinburgh University Press. ISBN 978-0748627592.
- Berndt, Ronald Murray; Vogelsang, T. (1939). Notes on the Dieri tribe of South Australia. Royal Society of South Australia.
- Berndt, Ronald Murray; Vogelsang, T. (1941). The Initiation of Native-doctors, Dieri Tribe, South Australia. South Australian Museum.
- Fison, Lorimer; Howitt, Alfred William (1880). Kamilaroi and Kurnai (PDF). Melbourne: G Robinson.
- Fison, Lorimer; Taplin, George (1879). Folklore, manners, customs and languages of the South Australian aborigines (PDF). Adelaide: E Spiller, Acting Government Printer. pp. 28–29.
- Gason, Samuel (1879) [First published 1874]. "The Dieyerie tribe of Australian Aborigines". In Woods, J. D. (ed.). Native Tribes of South Australia. Adelaide: E. S. Wigg & Son. pp. 253–307.
- Howitt, Alfred William (1891). "The Dieri and Other Kindred Tribes of Central Australia". The Journal of the Anthropological Institute of Great Britain and Ireland. 20: 30–104. doi:10.2307/2842347. JSTOR 2842347.
- Howitt, Alfred William (1904). The native tribes of south-east Australia. Macmillan Publishers.
- Howitt, Alfred William; Siebert, Otto (January–June 1904). "Legends of the Dieri and Kindred Tribes of Central Australia". The Journal of the Anthropological Institute of Great Britain and Ireland. 34: 100–129. doi:10.2307/2843089. JSTOR 2843089.
- Kendon, Adam (1988). Sign Languages of Aboriginal Australia: Cultural, Semiotic and Communicative Perspectives. Cambridge University Press. ISBN 978-0-521-36008-1.
- Koch, Harold; Hercus, Luise; Kelly, Piers (2018). "Moiety Names in South-Eastern Australia: Distribution and Reconstructed History". In McConvell, Patrick; Kelly, Piers; Lacrampe, Sébastian (eds.). Skin, kin and clan: the dynamics of social categories in indigenous Australia (pdf). Australian National University Press. pp. 139–178.
- Korn, Francis (1971). "Terminology and "Structure": The Dieri Case". Bijdragen tot de Taal-, Land- en Volkenkunde. 127 (1): 39–81. doi:10.1163/22134379-90002791. JSTOR 27861162.
- Lévi-Strauss, Claude (1969). The Elementary Structures of Kinship. Beacon Press.
- McCaul, Kim (2016). "The making of a Simpson Desert clever man". In Austin, Peter K.; Koch, Harold; Simpson, Jane (eds.). Language, Land and Song. London: EL Publishing. pp. 344–357.
- Tindale, Norman Barnett (1974). "Dieri (SA)". Aboriginal Tribes of Australia: Their Terrain, Environmental Controls, Distribution, Limits, and Proper Names. Australian National University Press. ISBN 978-0-708-10741-6.
- Trefry, David (1970). "The phonological word in Dieri". In Laycock, D. C. (ed.). Linguistic trends in Australia. AIATSIS. pp. 65–73.
