= Pilatapa =

Aboriginal Australian people

The Pilatapa (or Pirlatapa, Birladapa, or Biladaba) were an Indigenous people of South Australia, now extinct.

== Country ==
Norman Tindale estimated that the Pilatapa had some 5,000 square miles (13,000 km^{2}) of tribal land, ranging northeast of the northern edges of the Flinders Ranges and to the north of the Lake Frome drainage basin. On the northwest they lived also around northwest to what is now the Strzelecki Desert Lakes encompassing Lake Blanche and Blanchewater. He placed their eastern extension at east to Callabonna approximately to the vicinity of Tilcha, while their southern boundaries were around Wooltana and Hamilton Creek.

== Language ==
Their language, Pilatapa, was closely related to the Diyari language.

== Social organisation and customs ==
Samuel Gason's account of the Pilatapa is integrated into a general description of the Diyari, Ngameni, Yandruwandha and Yauraworka. Male initiation rites involved circumcision, but excluded subincision.

== Alternative names ==
- Pidlatapa
- Piladapa, Pilladapa, Pillitapa
- Billidapa
- Pulladapa
- Berluppa
- Pilliapp
- Jarikuna (Wailpi pejorative exonym) (Note: the component kuna means "dung"; the term was used by tribes in the Flinders Ranges basically to refer to the impoverished soil of the land occupied by their northern neighbours, the Pilatapa.)
- Yarrikuna

== Sources ==
- "Aboriginal South Australia". Government of South Australia. Archived from the original on 1 May 2013.
- "AIATSIS map of Indigenous Australia". AIATSIS.
- Gason, Samuel (1886). "From Mount Freeling to Pirigundi Lake" (PDF). In Curr, Edward Micklethwaite (ed.). The Australian race: its origin, languages, customs, place of landing in Australia and the routes by which it spread itself over the continent. Vol. 2. Melbourne: J. Ferres. pp. 44–105.
- Gason, Samuel (1895). "Of the tribes, Dieyerie, Auminie, Yandrawontha, Yarawuarka, Pilladapa". Journal of the Anthropological Institute of Great Britain and Ireland. 24: 167–176. JSTOR 2842215.
- Mathews, R. H. (1898). "Group divisions and initiation ceremonies of the Barkungee tribes". Journal of the Proceedings of the Royal Society of New South Wales. 32: 241–255. doi:10.5962/p.359301. S2CID 259756893.
- Mathews, R. H. (January 1900). "Divisions of the South Australian Aborigines". Proceedings of the American Philosophical Society. 39 (161): 78–91+93. JSTOR 983545.
- Tindale, Norman Barnett (1974). "Pilatapa (SA)". Aboriginal Tribes of Australia: Their Terrain, Environmental Controls, Distribution, Limits, and Proper Names. Australian National University Press. ISBN 978-0-708-10741-6.
