= Wilson River language =

Indigenous language of Australia

Wilson River
- Palpakunu
- Native to: Australia
- Region: Wilson River (Queensland)
- Ethnicity: Wongkumara, Ngandangara, Punthamara, Kungadutji, ?Thereila
- Extinct: probably by 2005
- Language family: Pama–Nyungan: Karnic; East Karnic (Ngura); Wilson River
- Dialects: Punthamara (Bundhamara); Ngandangara (Yarumarra, Eromarra); 'Modern' Wangkumara; Wangkumara (Galali); Gungadidji; ?Mambangura/Thereila

Language codes
- ISO 639-3: Variously: xpt – Punthamara ntg – Ngantangarra gdt – Kungardutyi xwk – Wangkumara eaa – Karenggapa
- Glottolog: ngur1261
- AIATSIS: L30 Ngandangara, L26 Punthamara, L56 Yarrumada, L68 'Modern' Wangkumara, D71 Galali (McDonald & Wurm's Waŋkumara (Gaḷali)), L16 Gungadidji, L15 Karenggapa, L25 Wangkumara
- ELP: Wangkumara; Punthamara
- Wangkumara is classified as Critically Endangered by the UNESCO Atlas of the World's Languages in Danger.

The Wilson River language, also known as "Modern" Wankumara (Wangkumara/ Wanggumara), is an Australian Aboriginal language of the Karnic family. It was spoken by several peoples along the Wilson River in Queensland. Of these, the Wanggumara (Wangkumara) and Galali may have migrated from the Bulloo River and abandoned their language when they arrived.

== Speakers ==
In 1981, the language was still spoken by four members of the Wangkumara community around Cooper Creek, the Thomson River, and the Warry Warry Creek, the town of Eromanga and the Nuccundra. It appears to have gone extinct by 2005.

== Varieties ==
Dixon (2002) considers Punthamara to be a dialect of Wangkumara, Bowern (2001) as very close. Bowern says that Ngandangara also appears to have been "very close", although data is too poor for a proper classification. Karenggapa is either a dialect or an alternative name. (McDonald & Wurm 1979) note that Wilson River Galali, what they call "Waŋkumara (Gaḷali)", is very close to modern Waŋkumara and Bundamara.

Breen (1967) states that the (Karnic) speech of the groups along the Wilson River are essentially identical. These include Bundhamara, Gungadudji, 'Modern' Wanggumara and Ngandangura. For instance, that Gungadidji is 'almost identical to Punthamara and modern Wangkumara'. Nonetheless, these language varieties have been assigned individual ISO codes.

Mambangura (the language of the Thereila) may have belonged as well. At least, the Yandruwandha term Palpakunu covered it as well as the other Wilson River dialects.

A language labelled "Wonkomarra" in Myles (1886) is a different language from modern Wangkumara, and may be a variety of Kalali.

== Features ==
Wangkumara is notable for being a language with a tripartite verbal alignment. Wurm's Wankamara (Galali) is entirely suffixing and morphologically fairly simple having the following word classes: nominal (noun and pronoun), verb, particle, and interjection. The word order is random and free. The phonemes consist of three vowels and 26 consonants.

== Phonology ==
=== Consonants ===
	Peripheral		Laminal		Apical	
	Labial	Velar	Dental	Palatal	Alveolar	Retroflex
Plosive	p/b	k/ɡ	t̪/d̪	c/ɟ	t/d	ʈ/ɖ
Nasal	m	ŋ	n̪	ɲ	n	ɳ
Rhotic					r	ɻ
Lateral			l̪	ʎ	l	ɭ
Approximant	w			j		

- /d̪/ can have an allophone of [ð] when after /l̪/.
- Sounds /b, ɟ, ɡ/ can be lenited as fricatives [β, ʒ, ɣ] when in intervocalic positions or after lateral sounds.

=== Vowels ===
	Front	Central	Back
High	i		u
Low		a	

The vowel sounds are a three-vowel system. Vowel length is not evenly distributed, but is mostly heard phonetically when preceding voiced consonants. Allophones may also occur.

Phoneme	Allophone
/i/	[i], [ɪ]
/a/	[ä], [a], [ɐ]
/u/	[u], [ʊ]
