= Eastern Karnic language =

Eastern Karnic language may be,

- The ISO reference name for those purported Ngura "languages" of Australia that do not have sufficient attested data to be established as actual languages,
- One of the Eastern Karnic languages of Australia, such as Garlali, Wangkumara and Bundhamara, which have been assigned distinct ISO codes.
