= Wyara County, Queensland =

County in queensland

Coordinates: 28.483°S 143.850°E

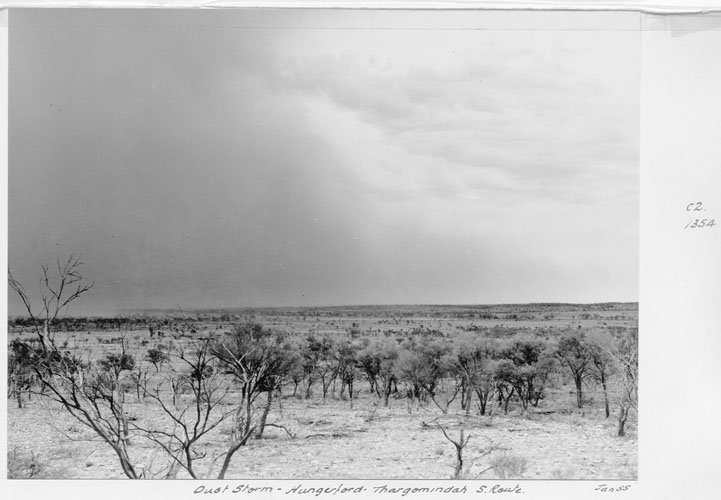
Dust storm, Wyara County landscape, January 1955

Wyara County is a cadastral division of Queensland, Australia. It is in remote western Queensland.

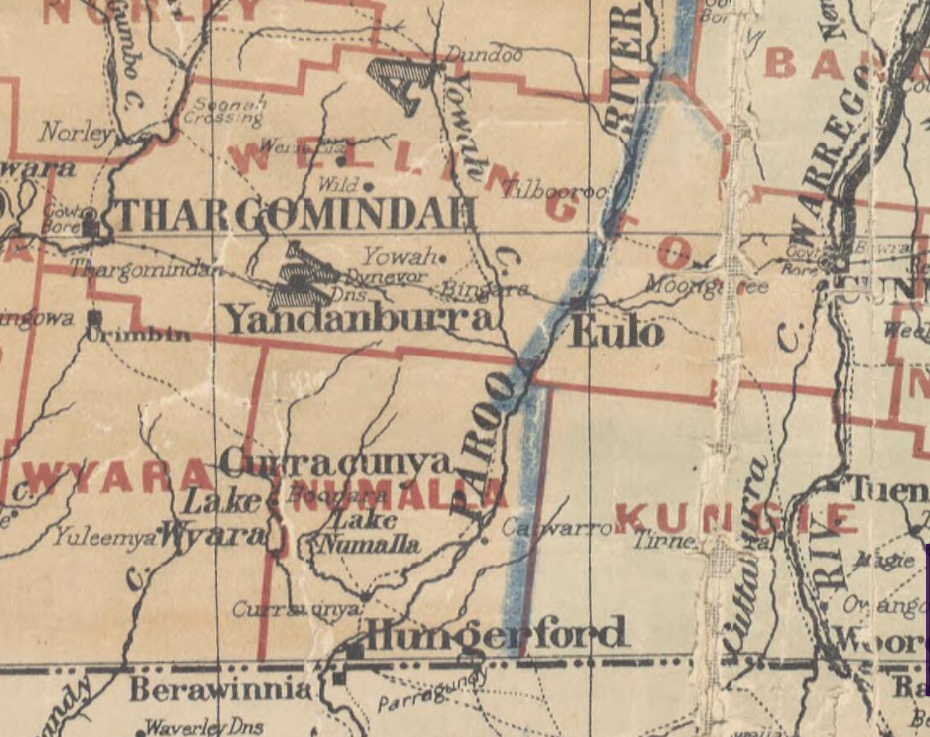
Queensland counties showing Wyara County

The county came into existence on 8 March 1901, when the Governor of Queensland issued a proclamation legally dividing Queensland into counties under the Land Act 1897. At this point Wyara was taken off the existing Wellington County to form the current adjoining counties.

The entirety of the county is incorporated land with the seat of local government at Thargomindah, Queensland. The county was originally divided into parishes.

Like all counties in Queensland, it is a non-functional administrative unit, that is used mainly for the purpose of registering land titles. From 30 November 2015, the government no longer referenced counties and parishes in land information systems however the Museum of Lands, Mapping and Surveying retains a record for historical purposes.

== History ==
Both the Kalali and the Wanggumara people traditionally lived in the county. White settlement came in the 1860s.

A post office was established in 1870 and a telegraph line connected the town to Cunnamulla in 1881.

== Climate ==
Wyara County has a hot semi-arid climate (Köppen BSh), very closely bordering on a hot arid climate (BWh), which is found in the western part of the shire. Summers are sweltering and generally dry except when monsoonal incursions into the continent bring heavy rain, whilst winters are warm and dry with cool to cold mornings.

The state border forms the southern boundary of the county and Narriearra Caryapundy Swamp National Park in New South Wales is to the south of the county.
