= Yarluyandi =

Aboriginal people of South Australia

The Yarluyandi, also known as Jeljendi, are an Aboriginal Australian people of north-eastern South Australia.

== Country ==
In Norman Tindale's calculations, the Yarluyandi had some 18,000 square kilometres (6,900 mi^{2}) of land within their tribal domain, taking in the Mulligan River south of Annandale to Alton Downs. Their western confines were in the vicinity of Atna Hill, while their eastern extension went as far as Birdsville and the Diamantina River.

=== Native title ===
The Yarluyandi now form an aggregate with the Wangkangurru people, and are represented by the Wangkangurru Yarluyandi Aboriginal Corporation. Their native title over a large area of the Simpson Desert was recognised in 2014.

== Language ==
Yarluyandi
- Jeljendi, Yelyendi
- Native to: Australia
- Region: South Australia
- Ethnicity: Yarluyandi
- Extinct: (date missing)
- Language family: Pama–Nyungan: Karnic; Karna; Dieric; Ngamini; Yarluyandi

Language codes
- ISO 639-3: yry
- Glottolog: yarl1238
- AIATSIS: L31
- ELP: Yarluyandi
- Coordinates: 25°50′13.4″S 139°35′03.7″E

The Yarluyandi language was closely related to the Ngamini language.

== Alternative names ==
- Jeljujendi
- Yelyuyendi
- Yarleeyandee

== Sources ==
- Howitt, Alfred William (1904). The native tribes of south-east Australia (PDF). Macmillan.
- Howitt, Alfred William; Siebert, Otto (January–June 1904). "Legends of the Dieri and Kindred Tribes of Central Australia". The Journal of the Anthropological Institute of Great Britain and Ireland. 34: 100–129. doi:10.2307/2843089. JSTOR 2843089.
- Paull, W.J. (1886). "Warburton River". In Curr, Edward Micklethwaite (ed.). The Australian race: its origin, languages, customs, place of landing in Australia and the routes by which it spread itself over the continent (PDF). Vol. 2. Melbourne: J. Ferres. pp. 18–21.
- Strehlow, C. (1910). Leonhardi, Moritz von (ed.). Die Aranda- und Loritja-Stämme in Zentral-Australien Part 3 (PDF). Joseph Baer & Co.
- Tindale, Norman Barnett (1974). "Jeljendi (SA)". Aboriginal Tribes of Australia: Their Terrain, Environmental Controls, Distribution, Limits, and Proper Names. Australian National University Press. ISBN 978-0-708-10741-6. Archived from the original on 12 June 2018.
