= XWK =

XWK may refer to:

- IATA station code for Karlskrona railway station, Blekinge, Sweden
- ISO 639-3 code for the Wilson River language, an Australian Aboriginal language
- Postal code for Xewkija, Malta
