= Kalali language =

Australian Aboriginal language

Kalali
- Garlali; Bulloo River
- Native to: Australia
- Region: Bulloo River, Queensland
- Ethnicity: Kalali
- Extinct: 1980s
- Revival: 2020s
- Language family: Pama–Nyungan: Ngura (geographical); Kalali

Language codes
- ISO 639-3: gll
- Glottolog: kala1380
- AIATSIS: D30 Kullilli, L25 Wangkumara (Curr's Wongkomarra), L43 Bidjara, L57 Minkabari
- ELP: Garlali

Kalali, also written Kullili, Galali, Garlali, Kullilla and other variants, is an Australian Aboriginal language, of Queensland, Australia.

It is one of several geographically transitional "Karna–Mari fringe" languages that have not been convincingly classified, and is best considered an isolate branch within the Pama–Nyungan family. Gavan Breen provisionally includes Minkabari and the Ngura dialect Pitjara/Bidjara/Bitharra, which together have been called the Bulloo River language. Breen is partly responsible for the variation in the spelling of the name 'Kalali'. The forms Garlali and Galarli are due to what he now considers a non-distinctive instance of retroflex rl, and he prefers the spelling Kalali.

== People and language ==
Both the Kalali and the Wanggumara people apparently lived by the Bulloo River and the Wilson River in South West Queensland. There is some debate whether they originated by the Bulloo River and migrated to the Wilson River or vice versa. For instance, Breen posited that some groups in south-west Queensland had abandoned their original languages (but not their names) and adopted the Wilson River language in the early days of Australian colonial settlement, when people moved from Thargomindah and the middle Bulloo River to Nockatunga (near the modern town of Noccundra).

The Bulloo River Kalali lived around the area from Thargomindah southward to the Currawinya Lakes and perhaps west to Bulloo Lakes and north to Norley Station. Bulloo River Kalali was studied by Breen (from a speaker named Charlie Phillips). The informant Charlie Phillips aged 74 years, born at Backwood Station south of Hungerford in south-west Queensland, spoke the language fluently and confidently despite having not used the language conversationally for 40 years.

A language labelled "Wonkomarra" in Myles (1886) is a different language from modern Wangkumara, and may be a variety of Kalali. On the other hand, the language spoken by the Kalali people that Wurm labelled "Waŋkumara (Gaḷali)" was a variety of Wangkumara.

== Language revival ==
Kullilli Ngulkana is a language revival initiative founded by brothers Toby Adams and Daryl Docherty. Adams' father was one of the Stolen Generations, having been taken as a child from his Quilpie home to the Aboriginal reserve at Cherbourg, and Adams became determined to reconnect to his culture and language. After meeting linguist Claire Bowern of Yale University, who had previously worked with Kullili elders to produce language resources, the pair started working together. The project has started to develop a dictionary and other learning resources for the language, including a mobile phone app. The state school at Thargomindah is also working with Adams, looking at incorporating language learning into their curriculum.
