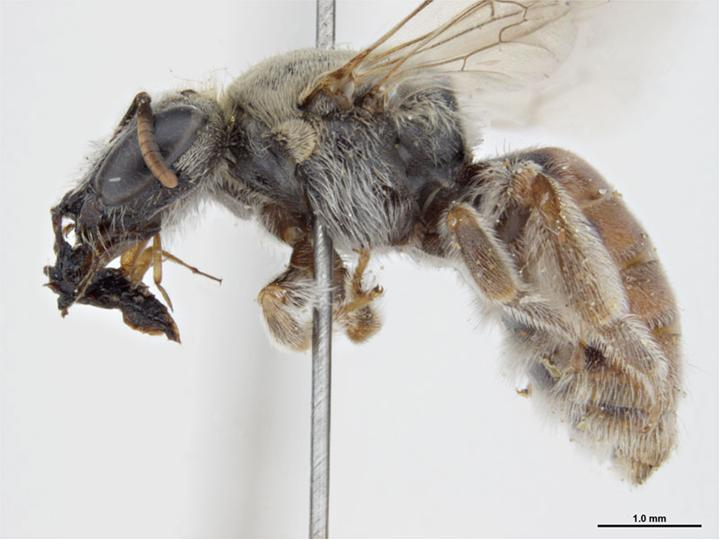
- Female

Scientific classification
- Kingdom: Animalia
- Phylum: Arthropoda
- Clade: Pancrustacea
- Class: Insecta
- Order: Hymenoptera
- Family: Colletidae
- Genus: Leioproctus
- Species: L. mas

Binomial name
- Leioproctus mas Michener, 1965

= Leioproctus mas =

Species of bee

Leioproctus mas, or Leioproctus (Baeocolletes) mas, is a species of bee in the family Colletidae and subfamily Colletinae. It is endemic to Australia. It was described by American entomologist Charles Duncan Michener in 1965.

== Etymology ==
The specific epithet mas alludes to the holotype being the first male of the subgenus to be collected.

== Description ==
Male body length nearly 7 mm, forewing length nearly 4.5 mm. Integumental colouration mainly black and brown, hair white.

== Distribution and habitat ==
The species occurs in South West Queensland. The type locality is 8 km north of Nockatunga Station.

== Behaviour ==
The adults are flying mellivores.
