= NBX =

NBX can refer to:

- nbx, the ISO 639-3 code for the Wangkumara language
- NetBIOS over IPX/SPX
