= Ben Murray =

Australian stockman and cameleer (1883-1994)

Ben Murray or Benno Murray, also named, Parlku-nguyu-thangkayiwarna (21 December 1893 - 26 August 1994) was an Afghan/Arabana/Thirari man who worked as a stockman, cameleer, linguist and story teller. He worked closely with linguists, include Luise Hercus, from the 1960s to the 1980s in a number of languages including Thirari, a language closely related to Diyari, which he was considered the last fluent speaker of.

Murray's Arabana name was Parlku-nguyu-thangkayiwarna which, translated, means ‘bank of clouds settling down’ or 'a single cloud remaining stationary for a little while'.

== Early life ==
Murray was born at Frome Creek, just outside of Hergott Springs, now known as Marree, in South Australia. He was the son of Dervish Bejah, an Afghan cameleer who had been born in Baluchistan, in what is now Pakistan, and his mother was Karla-warru (also known as Annie Murray), who was an Arabana and Thirari woman.

When Murray was a small child, in around 1897, his mother took him to Muloorina Station where much of her family, including her parents, lived. From his grandfather, who was known to many as 'King Walter', Murray learnt much about his culture and lands and, to do so, would travel with him regularly. Together they would travel as far as Birdsville, a distance of 527 kilometres (327 mi) on foot.

As a young boy Murray also began working on the station as a stockman and one of his first jobs, when only 5 years old, was being strapped to a horse which was driving the rotating mechanism for a water pump. He would often have to do this for around two or three hours a day and he was 'so little that he could barely hang onto the saddle'.

In around 1903 he and Annie moved again, this time to Clayton Station, which was owned by Sidney Kidman and here he was able to learn more about horsemanship and, in another move in 1906, to Cannatalkaninna Station he began working as a paid stockman. In the role at Cannatalkaninna Murray worked alongside his younger brother, Ern, and they were paid two shillings a week, a low wage even for the time, and they were overworked and treated badly by the owners and staff there and it was said their 'situation amounted to slavery'. When Annie learned of this poor treatment she convinced them both to move with her to Killalpaninna Mission in 1908 and, knowing they would not be allowed to leave, the missionaries from there took the boys in the middle of the night.

== Life at the Killalpaninna Mission ==
The Killalpaninna Mission, also known as Bethesda Mission, was run by Lutheran missionaries and when Murray arrived he was 15 years old. Here he was given the opportunity to attend school for the first time and learnt how to read and write in English, German and Diyari (a language closely related to Thirari). As a part of his learning he read the Diyari language translation of the New Testament and, in doing so became a Christian. At an unknown date he was baptised by Pastor Wolfgang Riedel.

He also worked at the mission and one of his first jobs there was as a rabbit catcher and, from 1912, he was a leader within the camel team there having been taught many of his skills primarily by cameleers Akbar Khan and Tom Davies; he did, however, have periodic contact with his father who shared his skills with his son. On this team he worked to make and repair saddles as well as leading the monthly supply journeys to pick up goods and drop off goods produced there, like wool, for the mission at Marree. One of the goods that he would pick up was ochre mined in Parachilna, to be used by the Aboriginal people living at the mission and, in doing so, maintained the traditional red ochre trading network. For this job he was paid five shillings a week, an amount that he considered far too little.

In 1915 the mission closed due to financial reasons and a decline in people living there to approximately 100. The closure though was also likely also influenced by growing anti-German sentiment and missionaries being forced to relocate. Around this period Murrays mother also died.

== World War I service ==
An unclear period in Murrays life is his World War I service for which no records remain besides Murray's memories. The details of his enlistment are unclear and his personal papers, uniform and medals were destroyed by a fire at his home in 1979. To enlist he travelled to Adelaide, alongside two German men from the mission, in mid-1915 and undertook a brief training course. Shortly afterwards he was sent to Gallipoli where they arrived when the campaign was almost over.

After Gallipoli Murray was sent to Palestine where, in 1916, he briefly became a prisoner of war for a period of two weeks. He was shot shortly before being captured and remembered:

I sang out: 'Moosha malad! Akbar! Dadleh! Bejah! [his father's name]'. I said: 'Bejah! Dadleh!' That's what I said. And they take me then. They kept me. Better than getting a bullet! If I didn't sing out ... they would have killed me alright! They put a bullet through me - just missed coat [i.e. passed through coat]. But the second bullet didn't come, never come.

— Ben Murray, as quoted in 'Ben Murray (Parlku-Nguyu-Thangknyiwarna)' in Aboriginal History (1988)

He was able to get on well with his captors due to his knowledge of the Arabic language and Islamic customs. He was released on Armistice Day on 11 November 1918.

== Career in the pastoral industry ==
After the war and with the mission closed Murray took numerous roles on German owned farms and stations in the region and, during the Great Depression he began working as an overseer on a road building crew. During this period he joined the Royal Antediluvian Order of Buffaloes at Alawoona which he said meant he would be more likely to get road work opportunities.

In 1934, seeking a job further north, Murray visited Adelaide and, while there, visited Ted Vogelsang who he had known from his mission days and who was now working at the South Australian Museum as an attendant. Vogelsang then asked him to join him in assisting Norman Tindale in translating the papers of Johann Georg Reuther who had been a missionary at Killalpaninna for approximately 18 years. Reuther had done significant amounts of language work there, between 1888 and 1906, including recording grammar and a Diyari dictionary of 4,200 words.

Following the completion of this project Murray took a job working patrolling the dingo fence at Murnpeowie Station. In this role he would build a bush hut as a home but often travelled for long periods of time while patrolling the fence. He worked alongside his brother-in-law, Gottlieb Merrick, who was married to his sister and they worked with camels on their patrols.

In 1947 Murray applied for, and was granted on 10 September, an exemption from South Australia’s Aborigines Act (1934) which restricted his movements and how much he could be paid.

In 1948 it was determined that the fence was too difficult to maintain and he moved on from this position and took on work as a drover and, in at least one instance droved a mob of horses to Darwin via Alice Springs. He did return to work at Murnpeowie, this time as a dingo shooter and dogger, although he left soon after this when the new manager of the station begun shooting his camels and horses which both angered and disgusted Murray. He then took roles at numerous stations before settling in the ghost town of Farina in 1959 and continuing to take on work from there. In Farina Murray was, after a short period, its only resident and he lived there in the old police station and he would often 'jump on the rattler' (travel via train without paying the fare) to visit people in Marree.

== Work as a linguist ==
In 1965 he began working with linguists Bernhard Schebeck and Luise Hercus primarily around the Arabana and Wangkangurru languages although he also worked with Hercus in the languages of Diyari and Thirari. Murray is believed to have been the last fluent speaker of Thrari, which he learnt from his maternal grandmother Kuriputanha (who was also known as 'Queen Annie').

In their work together Hercus is credited as having pioneered interdisciplinary approaches to Aboriginal history in her work with him. Many of the interviews she recorded with him related to Aboriginal perspectives on the Afghan cameleers who Wangkangurru people called wadjabala maḍimaḍi which, in English, translates as 'white fellows with hair-string'.

In 1974 Murray would retire from his 'active' working life on cattle stations and working as a dogger following a horse riding incident on Witchelina Station when he was 83. This allowed him to devote more time to his linguistic work and Hercus introduced him to Peter Austin (linguist) that same year.

As a part of this Murray would often travel with them to remote parts of South Australia and he would identify important sites and link them, through storytelling, to his traditional knowledge.

== Later life ==
In 1979, following a fire at his home Murray moved into a cabin at the Wami Kata nursing home in Port Augusta.

In 1981, he was introduced to Philip Jones (author) and they would all continue to work together and collaborate until Murray's death.

He died there on 26 August 1994 at the age of 101.

== Description ==
Some of Murray's closest associates described him as:

[A] rugged individualist who stood in a unique and solitary position to Aboriginal society, to Afghan society, and to the white missionaries, station owners and managers for whom he worked. Ben is a strong person, both physically and mentally; he did not like compromises and hated injustice.

— Peter Austin, Luise Hercus and Phiip Jones, as quoted in as quoted in 'Ben Murray (Parlku-Nguyu-Thangknyiwarna)' in Aboriginal History (1988)
