= Adnoartina =

Aboriginal deity related to Uluru

Adnoartina is an ancestral being in Dieri culture. The being is described as taking the form of a gecko. Adnoartina is associated with the creation of Uluru.

Stories of Adnoartina have been passed down through generations of Dieri people. Such stories are known as dreamtime stories. Adnoartina is regarded as a spiritual figure in the dreamtime and continues to be a motif in the art, music and ceremonial practices of the Dieri.

== The story of Adnoartina ==
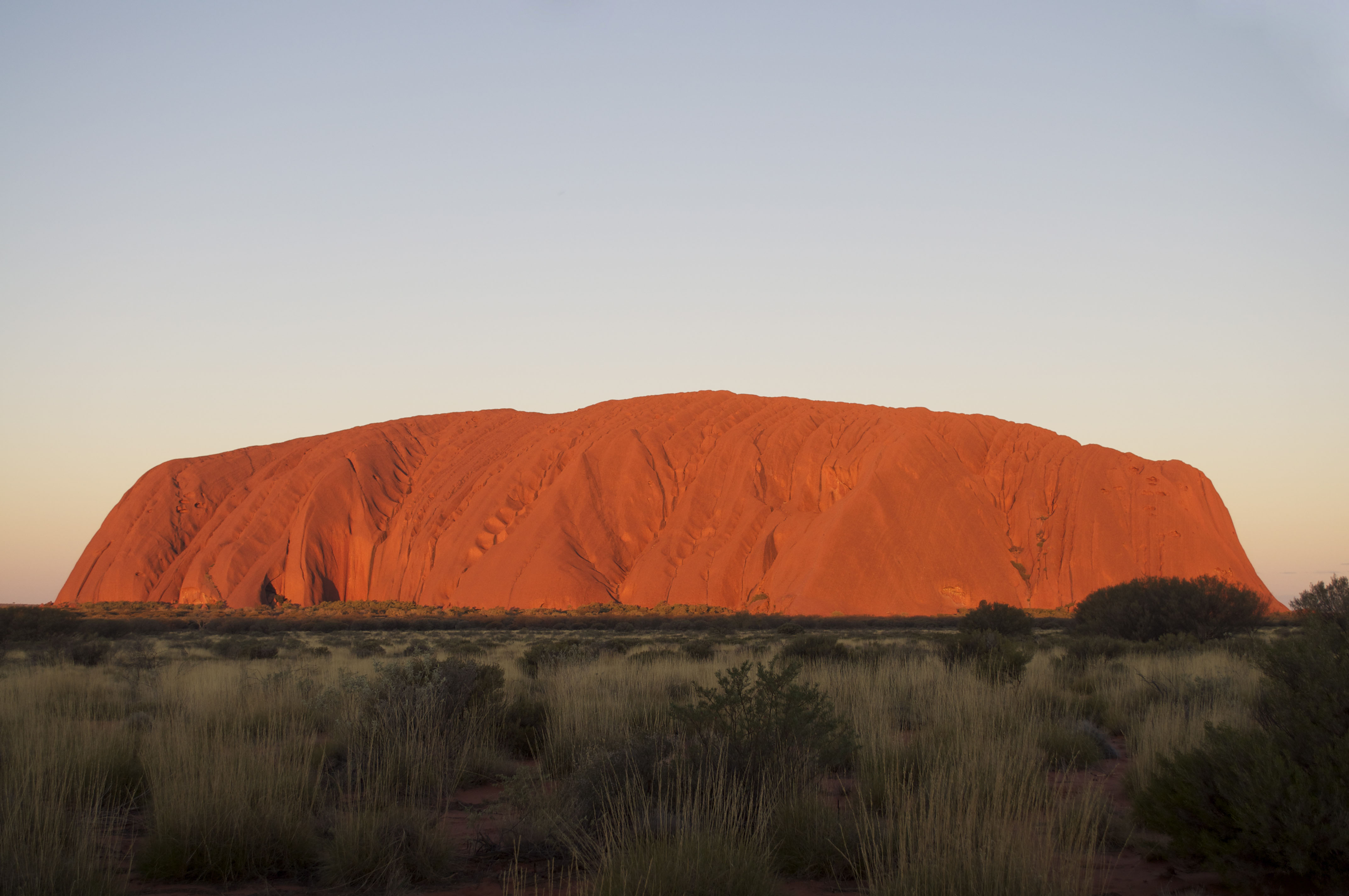
Uluru, Northern Territory, Australia

The gender of Adnoartina varies between stories - Adnoartina is commonly described as female, but sometimes as male or a non-gendered being. Adnoartina’s story describes how Uluru came to have its red ochre. The narrative follows the rivalry between Adnoartina and Marandi the dog as they hunt the same prey. Adnoartina challenged Marandi and as they fought, Adnoartina bit into Marandi’s neck, spilling his blood onto Uluru and staining it red. The story details how geckos were shaped to fend off predators as Adnoartina’s tail was used as protection during the fight. In their 1924 text, Aiston and Horne tell the story as follows:

“Marindi the dog leapt up and tried to catch Adnoartina by the back of the neck and shake the life out of him. But the lizard ran in low beneath the terrible fighting teeth. He seized the dog by the throat and hung on. In vain Marindi shook him and scratched at him with his claws. The sharp teeth sank in and in, until at last the red blood spurted out."

There have been alternative understandings of Adnoartina as not all stories link to the ochre of Uluru. In some narratives, the stain from Marandi’s blood is the source of ochre from the Pukardu Hill ochre mine site in the Flinders Ranges. In other stories, Marandi’s blood is the source of ochre from the rocks on the banks of the Mecca Creek in the Cloncurry Shire region of Queensland. However, the dominant narrative relates to the ochre of Uluru.

== Similar deities ==
As the ochre from Uluru is spiritually valued across various tribal groups, other groups have accounts of similar deities to Adnoartina. These deities include 'Kuringii', 'Kilowilina', 'Perilingunina', 'Itikaru' and 'Tjapara'. The stories of these figures differ. For example sometimes these beings are described as taking the form of an emu. However, a link across all stories is the belief that Uluru’s red ochre was created from the blood of a sacred being.

== Anthropological developments ==
The published work of ethnographer George Aiston and anthropologist George Horne offers direct knowledge of Adnoartina from the 1920s. Aiston in particular lived with the Dieri people for many years and translated the story of Adnoartina for English-speaking people.

== Significance of Uluru and red ochre ==
The blood of Marindi that was described to have dyed Uluru with red ochre is considered to be of spiritual value. In most Aboriginal cultures, ochre is believed to hold spiritual power. As the creation of Uluru is fundamental to the story of Adnoartina, the red ochre from this site is considered to be particularly valued. This ochre is used for ceremonial practices and art to communicate the story of Adnoartina and related beings. For example, red ochre is essential for the 'Mindari' ceremony of the Dieri people, otherwise known as the 'peace ceremony.' Red ochre is used in this ceremony for the purpose of symbolic and decorative ritual as people are painted and given bundles of red ochre to form a spiritual connection to Adnoartina. Other forms of ceremonial practice were the red ochre expeditions which the Dieri people considered to be a spiritual journey. This expedition socially connected various Indigenous peoples as different tribes would travel to the source of Uluru’s red ochre. It was believed that the red ochre expeditions had the power to connect people to Adnoartina and other related beings. Red ochre was further significant to Aboriginal peoples as it was historically used as a currency in trade. The ochre from Adnoartina’s story was valued in this context through its connection to mythology.

== Role in traditional culture ==
Adnoartina is considered to be a significant figure in understanding how Uluru was formed with red ochre by the Dieri. Adnoartina is a lizard guardian and was especially significant to the Dieri people as lizards were considered the most sacred of all animal beings.

== Role in modern culture ==
Adnoartina continues to be significant to Dieri people as dreamtime stories are passed down through generations of ancestors. Adnoartina now appears as inspiration for stories, art, ceremonies and music of modern culture. In modern art, red ochre is a primary material for many Aboriginal artists through its distinctive red colour and sheen quality. The red ochre associated with Adnoartina is called 'yamparnu' in local languages.

As Uluru has influenced modern culture through tourism, the story of Adnoartina has been shared to a modern audience.
