= Killalpaninna Mission =

Lutheran mission station in north-eastern South Australia, 1866–1915

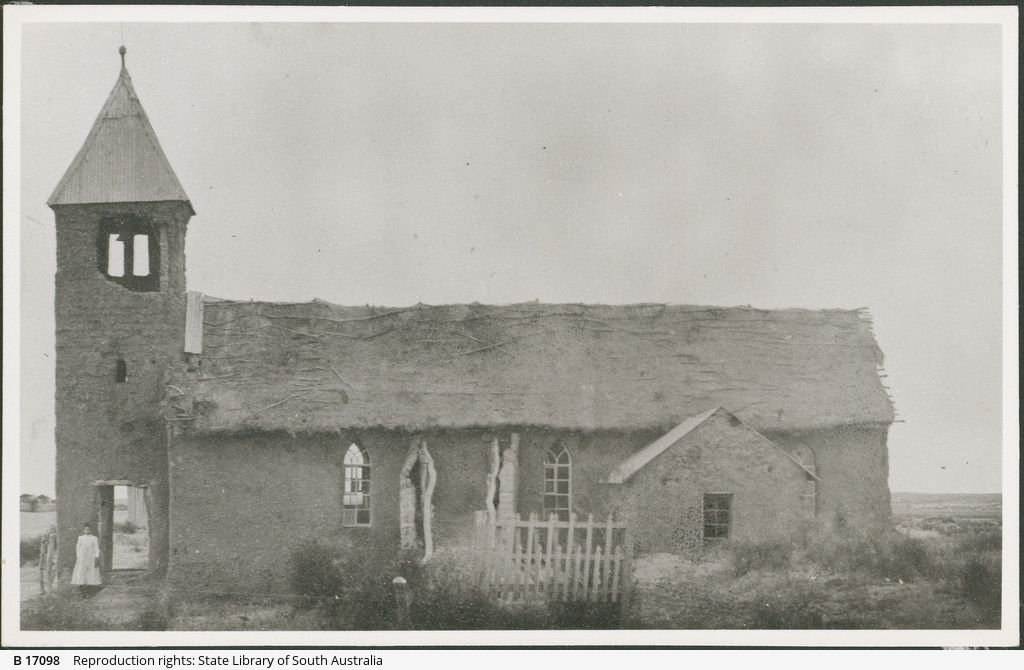
- Bethesda Church at the Mission just before demolition. Standing at the doorway is Helen Vogelsgang.

- Location within South Australia
- 28°35′53″S 138°33′22″E
- Location: Etadunna, South Australia

South Australian Heritage Register
- Official name: Killalpaninna Mission Historic Site
- Designated: 8 November 1984

Killalpaninna Mission, also known as just Killalpaninna, or alternatively Bethesda Mission, or alternatively Kopperamanna, was a Lutheran mission for Aboriginal people in northeast South Australia, whose site is now located in the locality of Etadunna. It existed from 1866 to 1915.

The mission was founded by two German missionaries, Johann Friedrich Gößling and Ernst Homann, and two lay brethren, Hermann Vogelsang and Ernst Jakob. After a difficult three-month journey from Tanunda, they established their mission station at Lake Killalpaninna (about 40 km south of Cooper's Creek) and tried to convert the Dieri (Diyari) people to Christianity. Anthropologist and linguist Carl Strehlow worked on the mission from 1892 to 1894, before moving to Hermannsburg. Strehlow and Johann Georg Reuther translated Christian works into the Diyari language, and also documented the grammar and vocabulary of the language.

One students and then workers at the mission was Ben Murray who moved there when he was around 12 years old after the missionaries took him from a station he was working alongside his brother Ern at the request of his mother Karla-warru (also known as Annie Murray) There was clear evidence that the boys were being mistreated and that their 'situation amounted to slavery'. Murray would later lead the camel teams at the mission and would remain in correspondence with the missionaries there for the remainder of his life; he would also, in 1934, assist in the translation of Johann Georg Reuther's (one of the missionaries) papers where they were being held at the South Australian Museum.

The South Australian Royal Commission on the Aborigines gathered evidence from the mission in 1914, and recommended that the mission be taken over by the government. The mission was closed by the state government in 1915. At that time, there were 70 Aboriginal children living at the mission.

After the mission closed, the station became a cattle station. The school continued to operate until 1917, when the government closed all Lutheran schools.

The station was listed on the South Australian Heritage Register on 8 November 1984 under the name "Killalpaninna Mission Historic Site".

== See also ==
=== Other 19th century Aboriginal missions in SA ===
- Koonibba
- Point McLeay
- Point Pearce
- Poonindie
