= Diyari language =

Australian Aboriginal language

Diyari
- Dieri
- Pronunciation: [ɖijaɻi]
- Region: South Australia
- Ethnicity: Diyari, Dhirari, Pilatapa
- Native speakers: 34 (2021 census)
- Language family: Pama–Nyungan: Karnic; Karna; Dieric (see for additional dialects and language codes); Diyari
- Dialects: Diyari; Dhirari, or Northern Dhirari + Southern Dhirari (Austin); ?Pilatapa
- Signed forms: Dieri sign language

Language codes
- ISO 639-3: dif
- Glottolog: dier1241 pirl1239 Dieric, incl. Ngamini
- AIATSIS: L17 Diyari, L14 Dhirari, L69 Northern Dhirari, L70 Southern Dhirari
- ELP: Diyari
- Diyari is classified as Critically Endangered by the UNESCO Atlas of the World's Languages in Danger.

Diyari (/ˈdiːjɑːri/) or Dieri (/ˈdɪəri/) is an Australian Aboriginal language spoken by the Diyari people in the far north of South Australia, to the east of Lake Eyre. It was studied by German Lutheran missionaries who translated Christian works into the language in the late 19th and early 20th centuries, so that it developed an extensive written form. Only a few fluent speakers of Diyari remained by the early 21st century but a dictionary and grammar of the language was produced by linguist Peter K. Austin who worked alongside Murray, and there is a project under way to teach it in schools.

== Related languages ==
=== Sign language ===
The Diyari had a highly developed sign language. This was first noticed by Alfred William Howitt in 1891, who first mistook them for defiant or command gestures until he then realised that they formed part of an integral system of hand signs, of which he registered 65. One of their functions was to allow women to communicate during mourning, when a speech taboo prevailed.

=== Dialects ===
Dhirari (extinct late 20th century) was a dialect of Diyari. Austin identified two variants of Dhirari, Southern and Northern, differing only in vocabulary.

Pilatapa (extinct by the 1960s) may also have been a dialect; data is poor.

== Region spoken ==
Diyari was traditionally spoken by the Diyari (or Dieri) people in the far north of South Australia, to the east of Lake Eyre. The mostly dry Cooper Creek and the Birdsville Track run through this very arid region. The whole area was occupied by the Diyari and many place names and mythological sites still exist.

Current Dieri speakers live in Marree, Port Augusta, Broken Hill, and Adelaide.

== Documentation and revival ==
=== Mission work ===
In 1867 German Lutheran pastors established a Christian mission station and sheep station at Lake Killalpaninna on Cooper Creek, known as Killalpaninna Mission or Bethesda Mission, which was closed by the South Australian government in 1914. The missionaries studied the language and used it, including preaching in Dieri and teaching it in the mission school from 1868. The earliest written records of the language date from 1870, by early missionaries Koch and Homann. Johann Georg Reuther and Carl Strehlow created dictionaries and other teaching aids in Diyari between 1895 and 1906, and translated a large number of Christian works into the language. Reuther translated the New Testament into Diyari, as well as compiling a lengthy manuscript on the language, culture, mythology and history of the Diyari people, including a 4-volume dictionary. The Diyari people were taught to read and write at the mission school, and written records show that the language was used in letters from about 1900 until about 1960. Dieri is therefore a relatively "literate" language, with a consistent orthography. During this period Diyari became a lingua franca, widely used by the missionaries and helpers as well as by Aboriginal people.

=== Loss and revival ===
After the mission closed in 1914, most of the Diyari people relocated to towns and stations, outside traditional territory, leading to loss of the language as they lived amongst people speaking English and other Aboriginal languages, although it continued to be used as a written language.

The first research by professional linguists started with American linguist Kenneth L. Hale's recording of a short text in 1960 from a native speaker called Johannes, who was living at the time in Alice Springs. Research on the language started in earnest in the 1970s, using tape recordings and notes which Luise Hercus and phonetician David Trefry had begun collecting in 1965 with the help of fluent speaker Ben Murray. This work was then carried on by Peter K. Austin who wrote his PhD thesis on Diyari in 1978, using tapes recorded by Hercus, of which a revised version was published as a grammar of the language in 1981. Reuther's manuscript was translated from German into English by Rev. P. Scherer in 1981.

Austin continued his research on the Diyari based on fieldwork he had done in the 1970s with the help of Ben Murray and he published translated texts, notes on literacy, language classification and vocabulary. By 1980, the language was still in use among a small number of families, but most people under 50 had learnt English as their first language. By the 1990s, most of his consultants on the language had died, and Austin assumed that the language was close to extinction. However, social and political activities among Aboriginal people in the 1990s relating to claims under the Native Title Act 1993 had a big impact on the language. The incorporation of a group of Diyari people who lodged a land claim, the Dieri Aboriginal Corporation (DAC), in 2001 had 600 identified members, many in the Marree area. In 2012 the Federal Court of Australia officially awarded an area of land centred on the Cooper Creek region to the DAC, and another claim was recognised soon afterwards.

In 2008 Greg Wilson began work with the Dieri Resources Development Group, based in Port Augusta, to prepare materials for teaching the language in school, with the support of the ILS (Indigenous Language Support program). A series of workshops resulted in the production of a CD-ROM called Dieri Yawarra and a print resource, "for community and school language revitalisation and second language learning". This was followed by a second, more ambitious, project in 2009, called Ngayana Dieri Yawarra Yathayilha! ("Let us all speak the Dieri language now!") to develop language lessons for schools at all levels (still a work in progress as of 2015).

In early 2013, Austin spent some months in Australia and travelled to Port Augusta to run language revitalisation workshops with Wilson and the DAC Group. In the same year, he published a draft dictionary in 2013, and revised his 1981 grammar, making it free online. Willsden Primary School in Port Augusta introduced a Diyari language programme, with members of the Warren family (who had long been collaborators with Austin) involved. An online blog was started and has proven a popular resource. Language revitalisation projects continue, with some input from the Melbourne-based Network for Linguistic Diversity (RNLD).

In 2015, Austin wrote that Ethnologue's assertion in its 16th edition that Diyari was extinct was incorrect, and on the contrary,

... there are today a number of people living today in South Australia and western New South Wales who grew up speaking Diyari as their first language and whose knowledge and linguistic ability ranges from fluent native speaker to semi-speaker to partial speaker. There are hundreds of people who know at least some words and expressions in Diyari... and a large group of young people who identify themselves as Dieri and are keen to learn about the language and their culture, history and heritage.

=== Ethnologue update ===
In its latest (22nd) edition in 2019, Ethnologue shows the population of speakers as 5 (2016 census), ethnic population 600, and status as "8b (Nearly extinct)". It further notes that the DAC started preparing Dieri language material for schools in 2009 and that the Mobile Language Team (MLT) worked with the DAC to complete a Dieri language learner's guide in 2017.

== Phonology ==
=== Vowels ===
	Front	Back
High	i	u
Low	a	

=== Consonants ===
		Peripheral		Laminal		Apical	
		Bilabial	Velar	Dental	Palatal	Alveolar	Retroflex
Plosive	Voiceless	p	k	t̪	c	t	ʈ
Plosive	Voiced					d ~ dʳ	ɖ
Nasal		m	ŋ	n̪ ~ d̪n̪	ɲ	n ~ dn	ɳ
Lateral				l̪ ~ d̪l̪	ʎ	l ~ dl	ɭ
Trill						(r)	
Flap						(ɾ)	(ɽ)
Approximant		w			j		ɻ

Several of the nasals and laterals are allophonically prestopped.

The voiced alveolar stop [d] may have trilled release [dʳ] depending on dialect. Peter Austin (1988) suggests that this is due to Yandruwanhdha influence.

The voiced retroflex stop /ɖ/ often becomes a tap [ɽ] between vowels.

The stop [d]~[dʳ] is in complementary distribution with both the trill [r] and the flap [ɾ]. Austin (1981) analysed the trill [r] as being the intervocalic allophone of /d/~/dʳ/, with the flap /ɾ/ being a separate phoneme. R. M. W. Dixon (2002) suggests that [ɾ] could be considered the intervocalic allophone of /d/~/dʳ/, so then /r/ would be a separate phoneme. Having /d/ realized as [ɾ] would parallel the realization of /ɖ/ as [ɽ], and having /r/ rather than /ɾ/ as a phoneme matches most other Australian languages.

== Grammar ==
Diyari has three different morphosyntactic alignments:

- Singular common nouns and male personal names follow an absolutive–ergative system.
- Plural first and second person pronouns follow a nominative–accusative system.
- Plural common nouns, female personal names and other pronouns follow a tripartite system.

== Sources ==
- Austin, Peter K. (1978). A grammar of the Diyari language of north-east South Australia (PhD thesis). Australian National University. doi:10.25911/5D723D30E5260. hdl:1885/132716.
- Austin, Peter K. (1981). A grammar of Diyari, South Australia. Cambridge: Cambridge University Press. ISBN 0-521-22849-2.
- Austin, Peter K. (1988). "Trill-released stops and language change in Central Australian languages". Australian Journal of Linguistics. 8 (2): 218–245. doi:10.1080/07268608808599398.
- Dixon, R. M. W. (2002). Australian Languages: Their Nature and Development. Cambridge: Cambridge University Press. ISBN 0-521-47378-0.
- Trefry, David (1970). "The phonological word in Dieri". In Laycock, D. C. (ed.). Linguistic trends in Australia. Canberra: Australian Institute for Aboriginal Studies. pp. 65–73.
