= Ngandangara =

Aboriginal Australian people

The Ngandangara were an indigenous Australian people of the state of Queensland.

== Country ==
In Norman Tindale's estimation, Ngandangara tribal lands extended over some 4,800 square miles (12,000 km^{2}). They were on the higher reaches of the ephemeral upper Wilson River; . To the north they were at Eromanga and approached the vicinity of Thylungra and Ray. Their southern limits lay around Nockatunga.

== Social organization ==
The Ngandangara were one of the most easterly Australian groups to employ the tribal rites of circumcision.

== Mythology ==
In 1928, P. D. Riddell, came across many Ngandangara, whom he identified as Unda Gnoora, further west at Durham Downs. He had gone there from Broken Hill to examine and photograph a notable arrangement of stones, measuring 90 by 200 feet in the district. The site where the stones were assembled, some as high as 3 feet, and in a distinct set of circles, was known as Alabena, which, because had been used for cattle mustering, a practice which contributed to the deterioration of the ceremonial ground's structure. The Ngandangara were extremely reluctant to reveal information about the locality, though Riddell eventually managed to ascertain from one informant that the site marked the ground where the first Aboriginal person "jumped up".

== Alternative names ==
- Ngandangura
- Jarumarda (language name)
- Unda Gnoora
- Eromarra

== Sources ==
- Myles, F.W. (1886). "Thargominda, Bulloo River" (PDF). In Curr, Edward Micklethwaite (ed.). The Australian race: its origin, languages, customs, place of landing in Australia and the routes by which it spread itself over the continent. Vol. 2. Melbourne: J. Ferres. pp. 36–41.
- Riddell, P.P. (1928). "Ordered arrangement of stones by aborigines at Durham Downs, Cooper's Creek". Transactions of the Royal Society of South Australia. 52. Adelaide: 165–166.
- Tindale, Norman Barnett (1974). "Ngandangara (QLD)". Aboriginal Tribes of Australia: Their Terrain, Environmental Controls, Distribution, Limits, and Proper Names. Australian National University Press.
