= Ngamini language =

Extinct Australian Aboriginal language

Ngamini
- Native to: Australia
- Region: South Australia
- Ethnicity: Ngameni, Yarluyandi, Karangura
- Extinct: late 20th century
- Language family: Pama–Nyungan: Karnic; Karna; Dieric; Ngamini
- Dialects: Ngamini; Yarluyandi; Karangura

Language codes
- ISO 639-3: nmv – inclusive code Individual code: yry – Yarluyandi
- Glottolog: ngam1265 Ngamini-Yarluyandi-Karangura
- AIATSIS: L22 Ngamini, L31 Yarluyandi, L28 Karangura
- ELP: Ngamini
- Yarluyandi

Ngamini is an extinct Australian Aboriginal language of the Pama–Nyungan family once spoken by the Ngamini and related peoples.
