= Pirlatapa language =

Language

Pirlatapa
- Biladapa
- Native to: Australia
- Region: South Australia
- Ethnicity: Pilatapa
- Extinct: 1930s, with the death of Blanche Tom
- Language family: Pama–Nyungan: Karnic; Karna; Dieric; Diyari?; Pirlatapa

Language codes
- ISO 639-3: bxi
- Glottolog: pirl1238
- AIATSIS: L11
- ELP: Pirlatapa

Pirlatapa is an extinct and poorly attested Australian Aboriginal language, presumably of the Pama–Nyungan family. It may have been a dialect of Diyari.
