= Peter Austin (linguist) =

Australian linguist

Academic background
- Education: Australian National University (BA, PhD)
- Thesis: A grammar of the Diyari language of north-east South Australia (1978)

Academic work
- Discipline: Linguist
- Sub-discipline: Language documentation; Syntax; Linguistic typology; Language revitalisation
- Institutions: SOAS University of London

Peter Kenneth Austin, often cited as Peter K. Austin, is an Australian linguist, widely published in the fields of language documentation, syntax, linguistic typology and in particular, endangered languages and language revitalisation. After a long academic career in Australia, Hong Kong, the US, Japan, Germany and the UK, Austin is emeritus professor at SOAS University of London since retiring in December 2018.

== Education and career ==
After completing a BA degree with first class Honours in Asian Studies (Japanese and Linguistics) in 1974, Austin earned his PhD with his thesis entitled A grammar of the Diyari language of north-east South Australia at the Australian National University (ANU) in 1978.

He then taught at the University of Western Australia, held a Harkness Fellowship at UCLA and Massachusetts Institute of Technology (MIT) in 1979–80, and in 1981 headed the Division (later Department) of Linguistics at La Trobe University in Melbourne. He held visiting appointments at Max Planck Institute for Psycholinguistics at Nijmegen, Tokyo University of Foreign Studies, University of Hong Kong, and Stanford University, and was Foundation Professor of Linguistics at the University of Melbourne from 1996 to 2002.

He became the Märit Rausing Chair in Field Linguistics in January 2003 and then Emeritus Professor in Field Linguistics at SOAS on his retirement in December 2018. Throughout his career, Austin has been deeply involved in work to document and describe languages that are otherwise on the verge of extinction.

He worked with Eli Timan on documenting Judeo-Iraqi Arabic, and with Sabah Aldihisi on Neo-Mandaic ritual language used by the Mandean communities of Syria, Iraq and Iran.

During his retirement, he worked with colleagues at University of Warsaw and Leiden University on an EU Horizon2020 Twinning collaboration called the Engaged Humanities project. He also worked with Stefanie Pillai of the University of Malaya, on a research project funded by the British Academy in Malaysia. In 2020 he was awarded a Leverhulme Emeritus Fellowship (2021-2023) to work on a dictionary of Diyari (South Australia) and a biography of his Diyari teacher Ben Murray.

== Work ==
He has done fieldwork on twelve Australian Aboriginal languages, particularly those from northern New South Wales ( such as Gamilaraay/Kamilaroi), northern South Australia, and north-west Western Australia, publishing several bilingual dictionaries. These included, in collaboration with David Nathan, the first fully page-formatted hypertext dictionary of an Australian language, with the creation of the 1994 Gamilaraay online dictionary.

=== Dieri ===
He has worked extensively and intensively on the Dieri (Diyari) language of northern SA. He first learned Diyari in 1974, from several fluent native-speakers, including Leslie Russell, Frieda Merrick, Rosa Warren, and Ben Murray, who he encountered in Marree, South Australia. Along with Luise Hercus and David Trefry, he did much research on the language in the 1970s. Austin published a grammar of Diyari in 1981.

From 2011 he has been working with the Dieri Aboriginal Corporation on revitalisation of the language. In 2013 he published a draft Diyari dictionary, writing in the preface that a companion grammar was also available, and that a text collection was in preparation. In 2014 he published an article "And still they speak Diyari", in which he wrote of the unique place of the language, as the subject of intensive interest by outsiders as well as native speakers for nearly 140 years, and that not only is it not extinct, but it is living and being maintained for the future.

Since 2013 Austin has maintained a blog on Diyari. The blog is one of a number of language revitalisation and reclamation activities held in conjunction with the Dieri community.

=== Austronesian languages ===
Since 1995, Austin has also worked on the Austronesian languages Sasak and Samawa, which are spoken on the islands of Lombok and Sumbawa in the Indonesian archipelago.

He has also published works on historical and comparative linguistics, typology, and Aboriginal history and biography.

== Awards ==
Austin has won the following awards and prizes:

- 1974: ANU Medal in Linguistics
- 1978: Harkness Fellowship of the Commonwealth Fund of New York
- 1999: Deutsche Akamedische Austauschdienst (German Academic Exchange Fellowship)
- 2002: Alexander von Humboldt Foundation Humboldt Research Award (Forschungspreis)
- 2010: Grant for a visiting professorship for Professor Anvita Abbi, from the Leverhulme Trust
- 2010: Alexander von Humboldt Foundation Humboldt Research Award
- 2015: Honorary doctorate from the Faculty of Languages at Uppsala University (for playing "a crucial international part in drawing attention to endangered languages by emphasising the importance of documenting the human cultural heritage represented by the thousands of languages at risk of vanishing in the near future. His motto that 'every lost word means yet another lost world' has boosted schools' and the public's interest in endangered languages" .)
- 2018–19: Alexander von Humboldt Foundation Humboldt Research Award
- 2020: Leverhulme Emeritus Fellowship, for further research on the Diyari language.

== Sources ==
- Austin, Peter Kenneth (February 1978). "A grammar of the Diyari language of north-east South Australia". ANU: Open Research Library. Canberra. doi:10.25911/5d723d30e5260.
- Austin, Peter. "Ngayana Diyari Yawarra Yathayilha: Supporting the Dieri language".
- Austin, Peter; Nathan, David. "Kamilaroi/Gamilaraay Dictionary".
- Austin, Peter K. (17 August 2008). "Peter K Austin's top 10 endangered languages". The Guardian.
- Austin, Peter K. (2013). "A Dictionary of Diyari, South Australia" (pdf).
- Austin, Peter (2014). "And still they speak Diyari: the life history of an endangered language". Ethnorema.
- Austin, Peter (2015). "And still they speak Diyari: the life history of an endangered language" (PDF).
- "Curriculum Vitae (Peter K. Austin)". SOAS.
- Dixon, R. M. W. (2002). Australian Languages: Their Nature and Development. Cambridge University Press. ISBN 978-0-521-47378-1.
- Dixon, R. M. W. (2011). Searching for Aboriginal Languages: Memoirs of a Field Worker. Cambridge University Press. ISBN 978-1-108-02504-1.
- Langton, Marcia (2012). "The Diaspora and the Return: History and Memory in Cape York Peninsula, Australia". In Hendry, Joy; Fitznor, Laara (eds.). Anthropologists, Indigenous Scholars and the Research Endeavour: Seeking Bridges Towards Mutual Respect. Routledge. pp. 171–184. ISBN 978-1-136-33115-2.
- "Peter K. Austin at The Linguistic Summer Institute 2015". 2015.
- "Professor Peter Austin BA (AS) Hons, PhD (ANU)". SOAS.
- "Professor Peter Austin". Gresham College.
- "Search results, Peter Austin". Engaged Humanities.
- "Two new honorary doctors at Faculty of Languages". Uppsala University. 16 October 2014.
