= Lake Hope (South Australia) =

Salt lake in South Australia

- Location in South Australia
- Location: Far North South Australia
- Coordinates: 28°23′14″S 139°18′18″E
- Type: Salt lake
- Primary outflows: Evaporation
- Basin countries: Australia
- Designation: Coongie Lakes Ramsar site
- Max. length: 12 km (7.5 mi)
- Max. width: 2 km (1.2 mi)
- Surface area: 36 km^{2} (14 sq mi)

Lake Hope is an ephemeral salt lake in the far north of South Australia.

== Description ==
It is situated approximately 160 kilometres (99 mi) south west of Innamincka and 180 kilometres (112 mi) north east of Marree. Both Lake Hope and nearby Red Lake are on the southern side of the Cooper Creek in the sand dune country. Both are also found within the boundaries of Mulka and Lake Hope Stations.

The lakes are both within the Lake Eyre basin and a fishing licence has been issued for each of the lakes for an operation out of Mulka Station. The licence allows the removal of 350 tonnes (344 long tons; 386 short tons) of Lake Eyre golden perch, Welch's grunter and the Barcoo grunter but only once the lakes have disconnected from the Cooper Creek after a flood event.

When full the lake occupies an area of approximately 3,600 hectares (8,896 acres) and is approximately 12 kilometres (7 mi) long. The lake is filled periodically from the flooding of Cooper Creek. In 1990 waters from Cooper Creek reached Lake Hope but did not reach Lake Eyre.

The traditional owners name for the lake is Pando penunie, which means great lake. The first Europeans to discover the lake were S. J. and R. J. Stuckey in October 1859. The named the lake because they hoped for greater fortune in the future. Thomas Elder took up the first pastoral lease in the area in 1860.

Lake Hope is located within the boundaries of the wetland system known as the Coongie Lakes, which is both listed internationally under the Ramsar Convention and within Australia with an identical listing in "A Directory of Important Wetlands in Australia".

== See also ==
- List of lakes of Australia § South Australia
