= Gelali-ye Jadid =

Gelali-ye Jadid گلالي جديد
- Village
- Location within Iran
- Coordinates: 34°28′00″N 46°48′01″E
- Country: Iran
- Province: Kermanshah
- County: Kermanshah
- Bakhsh: Central
- Rural District: Baladarband

Population (2006)
  - Total: 43
- Time zone: UTC+3:30 (IRST)
  - Summer (DST): UTC+4:30 (IRDT)

Gelali-ye Jadid (Persian: گلالي جديد, also Romanized as Gelālī-ye Jadīd; also known as Gelālī-ye Tāzehābād) is a village in Baladarband Rural District, in the Central District of Kermanshah County, Kermanshah Province, Iran. At the 2006 census, its population was 43, in 10 families.
