= Bidjara (Bulloo River) =

Aboriginal Australian people

The Bidjara people, also spelt Bitjara or Bithara, are an Aboriginal Australian people of south-western Queensland. They spoke a dialect of the Ngura language. They are not to be confused with the Warrego River Pitjara or the Badjiri of the Paroo River, both of whose traditional lands are further to the east of the state.

== Country ==
Norman Tindale estimated their lands as encompassing approximately 4,000 square miles (10,000 km^{2}), centered around Bulloo Downs, south to the south to Bulloo Lake floodplain. Their western border lay at the Grey Range. Their northern limits were at Orient, and their eastern frontier was around Clyde.

== Social organization and customs ==
The Bitjara included circumcision in their initiatory rites.

== Alternative names ==
- Bithara
- Pitteroo
- Minkabari (language name)
- Wilya

== Some words ==
- mirre (tame dog)
- urni (father)
- ummadi (mother)
- birri-birri (white man)

== Sources ==
- Howitt, Alfred William (1904). The native tribes of south-east Australia (PDF). Macmillan.
- Myles, F. W. (1886). "Thargominda, Bulloo River" (PDF). In Curr, Edward Micklethwaite (ed.). The Australian race: its origin, languages, customs, place of landing in Australia and the routes by which it spread itself over the continent. Vol. 2. Melbourne: J. Ferres. pp. 36–41.
- Sullivan, A. P. (1886). "Lower Bulloo River" (PDF). In Curr, Edward Micklethwaite (ed.). The Australian race: its origin, languages, customs, place of landing in Australia and the routes by which it spread itself over the continent. Vol. 2. Melbourne: J. Ferres. pp. 42–43.
- Tindale, Norman Barnett (1974). "Bitjara (QLD)". Aboriginal Tribes of Australia: Their Terrain, Environmental Controls, Distribution, Limits, and Proper Names. Australian National University Press. Archived from the original on 26 December 2017.
