= Luise Hercus =

Australian linguist (1926–2018)

- Born: Luise Anna Schwarzschild; 16 January 1926; Munich, Germany
- Died: 15 April 2018 (aged 92)
- Education: St Anne's College, Oxford
- Occupations: Linguist; professor

Luise Anna Hercus AM FAHA, née Schwarzschild, (16 January 1926 – 15 April 2018) was a German-born linguist who lived in Australia from 1954. After significant early work on Middle Indo-Aryan dialects (Prakrits) she had specialised in Australian Aboriginal languages since 1963, when she took it up as a hobby. Works authored or co-authored by her are influential, and often among the primary resource materials on many languages of Australia.

== Life and career ==
Hercus was born Luise Anna Schwarzschild on 16 January 1926 in Munich, Germany, to the artist Alfred and his wife, Theodora Schwarzschild. The family descended from a long line of rabbis, merchants and intellectuals. Her uncle was the noted astronomer and physicist Karl Schwarzschild. On the assumption of power in Germany by Hitler, their position as Jewish people rapidly deteriorated, despite financial assistance from an uncle who had emigrated to the United States. With her family, she took refuge in England in 1938, and the family settled in East Finchley, in northern London, where she attended Tollington Hill School. Due to the air raids on London, the family moved to Hampstead Gardens. At 17, Hercus won a scholarship to St Anne's College, Oxford, where she graduated with a bachelor's degree in Oriental Studies in 1946, followed by an M.A.

In 1948, she was appointed tutor and lecturer at St Anne's College, a position she held until 1954, when she emigrated to Australia. She married the scientist Graham Robertson Hercus, on 23 February 1955 (died 1974). Together they had one child, Iain Robertson Hercus, who obtained a doctorate in astronomy.

From 1965 to 1969, Hercus was a research fellow at the University of Adelaide, South Australia. It was at that time that she began to pursue private studies in Aboriginal languages, managing to pull some from the brink of oblivion, as for example with Wangganguru, which she recorded with the assistance of her informant, Mick McLean Irinjili. She also worked with Ben Murray who she would later collaborate in relation to the Diyari language as well. Many of the interviews that Hercus recorded with Murray related to Aboriginal perspectives on the Afghan cameleers who the Wangkangurru people called wadjabala maḍimaḍi which translates as 'white fellows with hair-string.

After 1969, she took up an appointment as senior lecturer, and then reader, in Sanskrit, in the Department of South Asian and Buddhist Studies at the Australian National University, Canberra.

In the 1970s, Hercus, along with Peter K. Austin and David Trefry, did research on the Diyari language.

Hercus had been publishing significant articles on linguistic features of Middle Indo-Aryan dialects (Prakrits) since 1953 (using her maiden name), and a collected volume reprinting and indexing them was published by the ANU Faculty of Asian Studies in 1991 (her last article on the topic was in 1979).

After 1991, she became a visiting fellow in the Department of Linguistics at ANU, writing up grammars, dictionaries and traditional texts, and continuing fieldwork, mainly in the north of South Australia and adjacent areas of New South Wales and Queensland.

A Festschrift was presented to Hercus on the occasion of her retirement in 1990.

In January 2016, AIATSIS presented Hercus with digital copies of the foundational sound recordings, of which she had made over 1,000 hours ranging over 56 native languages and dialects, as a token of gratitude in celebrating her 90th birthday. Included in the material were unique sound recordings of Pantyikali, Nukunu, Woiwurrung, Dadi Dadi, Djadjala, Gunnai, Narungga, Wadi Wadi, Wergaia, Kurnu, and Nari Nari. In addition, a second Festschrift, the book, Language, land and song: Studies in honour of Luise Hercus, with contributions from over 30 scholars, was published online in 2017, to honour her lifelong engagement with Aboriginal people and their languages.

== Indigenous languages ==
Hercus wrote on, among others, the following languages (and their dialects):

- Arabana-Wangkangurru
- Kaurna
- Nukunu
- Nauo
- Paakantyi (Baagandji, Bagundji)
- Thura-Yura languages
- Mirndi
- Nungali
- Yarli languages

Besides Australian languages, Hercus also studied Romance and early Indian languages.

== Works ==
Hercus was a prolific author, with 163 works to her credit at WorldCat Identities, but perhaps best known for the following works:

- (1965) The languages of Victoria: A late survey in two parts.
- (1981) The Bagandji language. (Pacific Linguistics)
- (1986) This is what happened: historical narratives by Aborigines.
- (1991) Collected articles of LA Schwarzschild on Middle Indo-Aryan (1953-1979)
- (1999) A Grammar Of The Wirangu Language From The West Coast Of South Australia
- (2009) Aboriginal Placenames: Naming and Re-naming the Australian Landscape. Aboriginal History Monographs, 19. ANU E Press. October 2009. ISBN 978-1-921666-09-4. (ed., with Harold Koch)
- (2009) Two Rainbow Serpents Travelling: Mura Track Narratives From the 'Corner Country'.
- (2010) with G Miller. P. Monaghan et al., A Dictionary of the Wirangu Language of the Far West Coast of South Australia, Tjutjunaku Worka Tjuta and University of Adelaide, Adelaide.
- (2012) Trees from the dreaming.

Of particular value to her Aboriginal informants is her

- (2011) Paakantyi Dictionary (AIATSIS).

== Honours ==
On 12 June 1995, Luise Hercus became a Member of the Order of Australia, for her service to education and linguistics, particularly through the preservation of Aboriginal languages and culture.

== Collaborations ==
Hercus worked with Janet Mathews (1914–1992), who recorded around 180 hours of Aboriginal music and language, "containing testimony from more than eighty Aboriginal people". Hercus co-wrote an obituary for Mathews after her death in 1992. Their work proved important in providing evidence of sacred sites on Mumbulla Mountain in New South Wales in the late 1970s.

== Notes and references ==
=== References ===
- "Celebrating Luise Hercus". Australian Institute of Aboriginal and Torres Strait Islander Studies. 22 January 2016.
- Rothwell, Nicolas (2010). Journeys to the Interior. Black. ISBN 978-1-863-95462-4.
- Schwarzschild, Luise Anna (1991). Collected articles of LA Schwarzschild on Middle-Indo Aryan 1953-1979. Faculty of Asian Studies, Australian National University. ISBN 978-0-731-51220-1.
- Sleeman, Elizabeth, ed. (2001). "Luise Anna Hercus". The International Who's Who of Women. Psychology Press. ISBN 978-1-857-43122-3.
- White, Isobel (1990). "Introduction". In Austin, Peter; Dixon, R.M.W.; Dutton, T.; White, I. (eds.). Language and History: Essays in Honour of Luise A. Hercus. ANU Research School of Pacific and Asian Studies. pp. 1–viii. ISBN 978-0-858-83398-2.
