= Bidjara (Warrego River) =

Aboriginal Australian people of eastern Queensland

The Bidjara or Pitjara are an Aboriginal Australian people of eastern Queensland. They are to be distinguished from the Bidjara of southwestern Queensland and the Badjiri of southern Queensland.

== Country ==
The Pitjara were estimated by Norman Tindale to have tribal lands of approximately 6,400 square miles (17,000 km^{2}), beginning with the areas of the headwaters of Nogoa and Warrego rivers. Their territorial extensions ran north of Augathella, to Mantuan Downs. Their eastern limits were around Killarney and Chesterton. To the south, they were present as far as Caroline, while their western borders were on the Nive River.

== History ==
Tindale entertained the possibility that the Pitjara and Badjiri split up, before the advent of white settlement, as a result of an easterly thrust by other tribes which caused them to develop as independent tribal realities.

== Alternative names ==
- Bidjera
- Peechera

== Sources ==
- Conn, W. R.; Playfair, L. M.; Hollingsworth, J. (1887). "Paroo and Warrego Rivers North of Lat.27 30', and Mungalella Creek" (PDF). In Curr, Edward Micklethwaite (ed.). The Australian race: its origin, languages, customs, place of landing in Australia and the routes by which it spread itself over the continent. Vol. 3. Melbourne: J. Ferres. pp. 270–286.
- Tindale, Norman Barnett (1974). "Pitjara (QLD)". Aboriginal Tribes of Australia: Their Terrain, Environmental Controls, Distribution, Limits, and Proper Names. Australian National University Press.
