= Thylungra =

Pastoral lease and sheep station in Queensland, Australia

Coordinates: 26.093°S 143.451°E

Location in Queensland

Thylungra Station is a pastoral lease that operates as a sheep station in Queensland.

== Description ==
The property is situated approximately 101 kilometres (63 mi) northwest of Quilpie and 108 kilometres (67 mi) southeast of Windorah. Neighbouring properties include the Milo and Budgerygar aggregation and Arleun Station, all owned or leased by George Scott, the current owner of Thylungra. It is located in the Channel Country on Kyabra Creek, a tributary of Cooper Creek.

The property is predominantly open downs flood-out country with black soils to the south, featuring large areas of gidyea stands interspersed with low sandhills. The north consists mostly of mulga country, while the remainder of the property is stony range country. The area mainly contains Mitchell grass, Flinders grass, blue grass, bluebush, buttongrass, burr and neverfail on the floodplains. Timbered areas feature stands of gidyea, mulga, coolibah, yarpunyah, bloodwood and supplejack.

== History ==
The traditional owners of the area are the Punthamara people, also known as Buntamurra, who have inhabited the region for thousands of years.

The name Thylungra is derived from the Buntamurra phrase thillung gurra meaning permanent water, as one of the waterholes in the area was thought to be permanent.

=== 1850–1899 ===
The property was initially established as a cattle station by pioneer Patrick Durack (1834–1898) in 1868, along with the nearby Kyabra Station.

By 1878, the property had been placed on the market, along with adjoining Bungindery Station. At that time, they occupied a combined area of 2,525 square miles (6,540 km^{2}) and were stocked with 9,000 head of cattle and 300 horses.

In 1882, Durack left Thylungra to establish Argyle Downs Station in the Kimberley. starting with approximately 7,250 head of cattle and 200 horses, which his cousins from the Durack family and groups of experienced stockmen overlanded about 3,000 miles (4,828 km). Half the stock did not survive the journey, which the Duracks and accompanying stockmen completed nearly two and a half years later.

Thylungra was sold some time in 1884, where it was described as "the reputation of being the finest station in the colony, instead of being lightly stocked with cattle, will be turned to their legitimate and most profitable use in the production of wool". Durack faced legal action to recover the commission still owed to the company that sold the property. The purchasers were the Queensland Cooperative Pastoral Company, which placed it on the market when it went into liquidation in 1886, along with several other properties including Galway Downs, Buckingham Downs and Pikedale. At this time, Thylungra occupied an area of 1,800 square miles (4,662 km^{2}) and was stocked with 15,000 cattle and 200 horses. By 1890, the property was owned by the Thylungra Pastoral Company.

The property had involvement with the 1891 Australian shearers' strike, with police patrols against the unionists.

By 1896, the lessee was the Union Bank of Australia, and the property was managed by Henry Roche. The area experienced its third year of the Federation Drought in 1897, with very little feed available.

The Land Board Court sat in late-1896 to determine the rent charged by the Union Bank, where it was stated the holdings were 13,000 square miles (33,670 km^{2}), it was considered to carry 20 head of stock per mile, dam-making was not favourable and only one of the bores could provide a fair supply of water, no regular summer rainfall at the time and the stock condition was presently poor due to food scarcity, and noted the property was the best in the district. The January 1896 return was 36,000 cattle, 471 horses, and 500 sheep; 8,690 cattle sold between August 1895 and November 1896, between 20 and 25 shillings a head (in 2020, about A$160 a head). With five permanent water holes, one individual suggested the run was better for sheep than cattle, with a possible carrying capacity of 200,000 sheep. The Court's decision was to reduce the rent from the 1893 assessment of £1 8s per square mile to £1 2s 6d. This was in line with several other properties.

The remoteness of the area saw several loss and near-loss of lives with an exhausted male (1884), a deceased travelling saddler (1887), a deceased person (1889), and a suicide (1896).

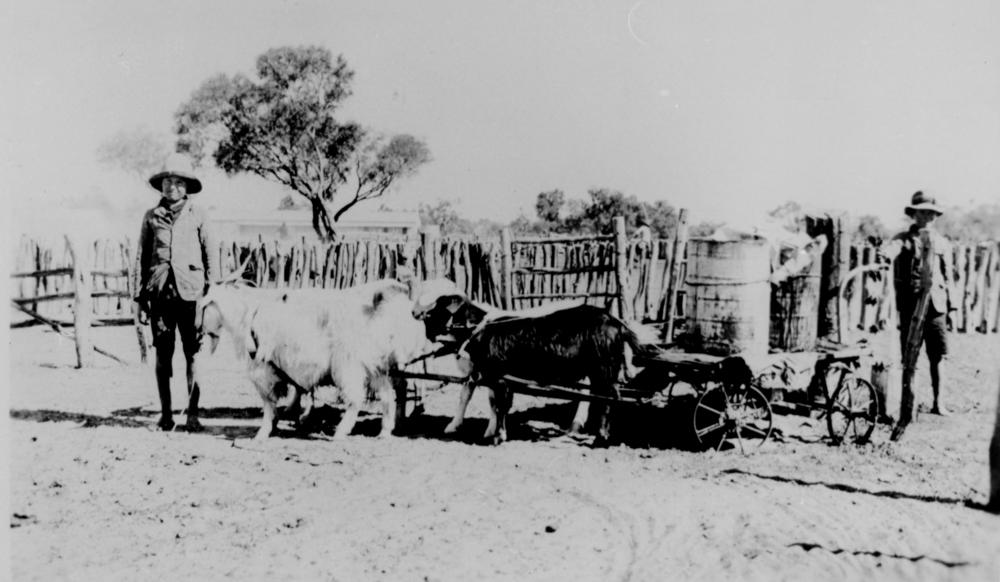
Two boys with a goat team, Thylungra Station, 1924

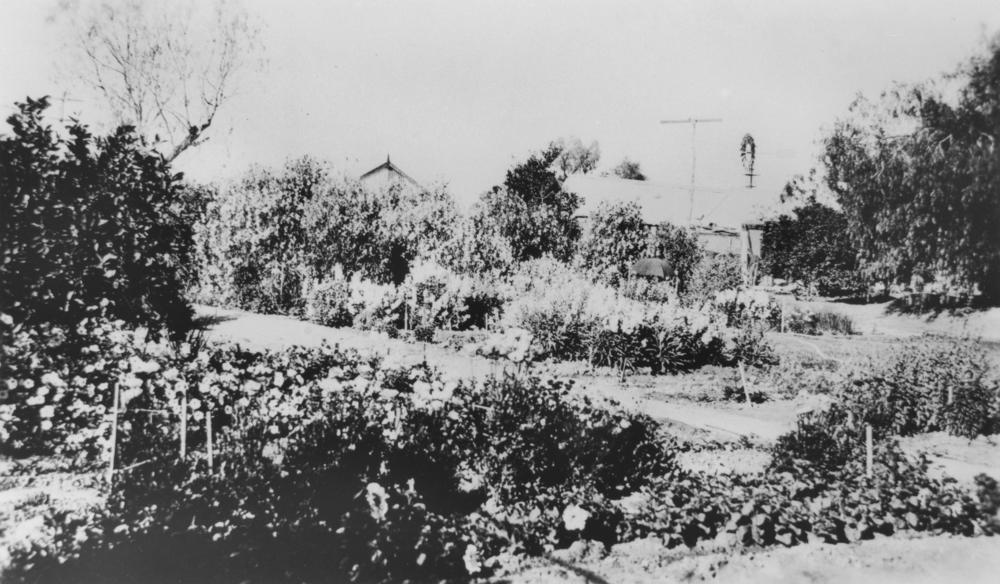
Garden at Thylungra Homestead in 1924

=== 1900–1949 ===
In mid-1901, the station was back in the Land Court, protesting against the pastoral rents, outlining the damage from the Federation Drought.

By 1902, the property was almost completely destocked. The Rabbit Board continued to be active against the pastoral and environmental damage of the pest.

At some time prior to 1906, the property had been stocked with sheep. In that year, it was purchased by politicians John Leahy (1854–1909), former premier Robert Philp (1851–1922), and James Forsyth (1852–1927), encompassing an area of about 1,000 square miles (2,590 km^{2}) of country. Philp indicated in early 1907 the pastoral holding was looking good, and intends to stock with sheep and make gradual improvements. In June 1907, 400 square miles (1,036 km^{2}) of resumed Thylungra land was sold at auction to Joseph Tully.

Shearers went on strike at Thylungra in 1910, demanding better equipment before returning to work, also deploring the poor wages and conditions by the property owners. The following year, over 100,000 sheep were to be shorn at Thylungra. Leahy died in 1909, and his interest in the property was sold to Forsyth and Philp. Thylungra produced 107 bales of wool weighing over 18 long tons (18 t) in 1913, at which time Simon Edwin Munro (1865–1945) joined the lease.

Wire-netting for rabbit-proof fencing was obtained on contract from the Queensland Government in 1912, but before parliament in November 1917 became a question of whether this was paid by the property owner. This came to light when an adjoining station lessee paid Philp and associates for his contribution of costs for the fence netting.

Poor wages among the shed hands was raised in December 1916, with another strike in October 1919 for a 40-hour week which was unsuccessful, settling on a 44-hour working week and free motor fares one-way to Charleville.

In mid-1925, the property lost 107 fattened cattle due to fuchsia bush poisoning when brought to the Quilpie trucking yards.

In July 1928 the pastoral lease rent for Thylungra was set at 45 shillings per square mile, even though drought conditions was observed in many areas a few months earlier.

In April 1933, the properties of Thylungra, Bulgroo, and Kyabra were collectively sold for £80,000 (in 2020, A$8,320,000) by Thylungra Pastoral Company (Messieurs Philp, Munro, and Forsyth) to the Australian Estates and Mortgage Company.

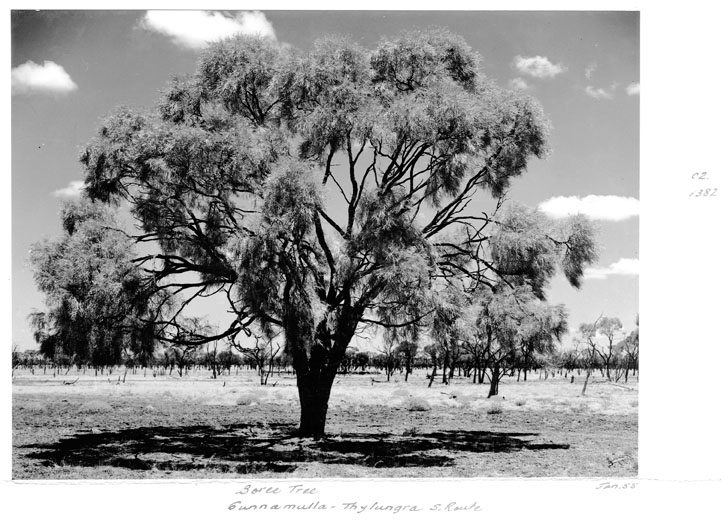
Boree tree and country Thylungra 1955

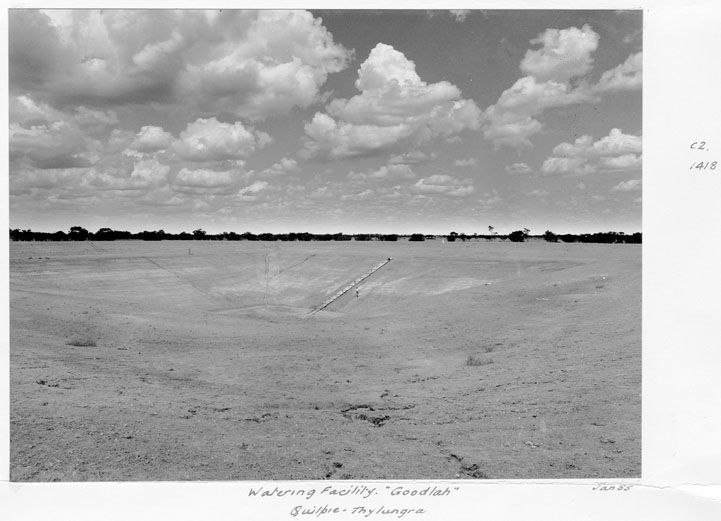
Watering facility at Thylungra January 1955

=== 1950–1999 ===
Thylungra was sold in 1992 by Toni Woods of Goondiwindi to Clyde Agricultural.

=== 2000 onwards ===
In 2008, the Clyde Agricultural Company sold Thylungra for A$10.5 million to George Scott in a private sale after it had been passed in at auction a month earlier. The property occupied an area of 2,820 square kilometres (1,089 sq mi) and was stocked with 45,000 sheep and almost 2,000 head of cattle. Since taking over the property, most of it was being fenced, and herd diversification with sheep for drought resilience was being considered.

In March 2025, the property and station buildings were inundated with flood waters from monsoonal rains; levels recorded at Jundah higher than the 1974 levels.

== See also ==
- List of ranches and stations
