= Golali, Kuzaran =

Golali گلالي
- Village
- Location within Iran
- Coordinates: 34°21′51″N 46°34′40″E
- Country: Iran
- Province: Kermanshah
- County: Kermanshah
- Bakhsh: Kuzaran
- Rural District: Haft Ashiyan

Population (2006)
  - Total: 130
- Time zone: UTC+3:30 (IRST)
  - Summer (DST): UTC+4:30 (IRDT)

Golali (Persian: گلالي, also Romanized as Golālī) is a village in Haft Ashiyan Rural District, Kuzaran District, Kermanshah County, Kermanshah Province, Iran. At the 2006 census, its population was 130, in 31 families.
