= Karangura =

Aboriginal Australian people

The Karangura (Karanguru, Garanguru) were an indigenous Australian people of far north west South Australia.

== Country ==
In Tindale's schema, the Karanguru were allocated some 3,200 square miles (8,300 km^{2}) of tribal territory, lying south of Alton Downs on the ephemeral watercourse known as Eyre Creek. Their eastern frontier is said to have been at Pandi Pandi. Their southern flank ran as far as the northern edge of Goyder Lagoon. They were also present at the Eleanor River.

== Social organization ==
The Karanguru were constituted of some 14 hordes.

== Alternative names ==
- Karangura
- Kararngura
- Kurangooroo
- Andrawilla (Note: This was the indigenous name for the site where an early police camp, now known as Andrewilla, was established.)

== Sources ==
- Eylmann, Erhard (1908). Die Eingeborenen der Kolonie Südaustralien (PDF). Berlin: D.Reimer.
- Howitt, Alfred William (1904). The native tribes of south-east Australia (PDF). Macmillan.
- Howitt, Alfred William; Siebert, Otto (January–June 1904). "Legends of the Dieri and Kindred Tribes of Central Australia". The Journal of the Anthropological Institute of Great Britain and Ireland. 34: 100–129. doi:10.2307/2843089. JSTOR 2843089.
- Paull, W.J. (1886). "Warburton River". In Curr, Edward Micklethwaite (ed.). The Australian race: its origin, languages, customs, place of landing in Australia and the routes by which it spread itself over the continent (PDF). Vol. 2. Melbourne: J. Ferres. pp. 18–21.
- Strehlow, C. (1910). Leonhardi, Moritz von (ed.). Die Aranda- und Loritja-Stämme in Zentral-Australien Part 3 (PDF). Joseph Baer & Co.
- Tindale, Norman Barnett (1974). "Karanguru (SA)". Aboriginal Tribes of Australia: Their Terrain, Environmental Controls, Distribution, Limits, and Proper Names. Australian National University Press. ISBN 978-0-708-10741-6. Archived from the original on 12 June 2018.
- Wells, F. H. (1894). "Habits, customs and ceremonies of the aboriginals on the Diamentina, Herbert and Eleanor Rivers, in east central Australia". 5. Australasian Association for the Advancement of Science: 515–522.
