= Gelali, Kermanshah =

Gelali گلالي
- Village
- Location within Iran
- Coordinates: 34°28′30″N 46°48′30″E
- Country: Iran
- Province: Kermanshah
- County: Kermanshah
- Bakhsh: Central
- Rural District: Baladarband

Population (2006)
  - Total: 187
- Time zone: UTC+3:30 (IRST)
  - Summer (DST): UTC+4:30 (IRDT)

Gelali (Persian: گلالي, also Romanized as Gelālī) is a village in Baladarband Rural District, in the Central District of Kermanshah County, Kermanshah Province, Iran. At the 2006 census, its population was 187, in 41 families.
