= Ngameni =

Indigenous Australian people

The Ngameni are an indigenous Australian people of South Australia who once spoke the Ngameni language.

== Country ==
According to Norman Tindale's estimation, the Ngameni held 6,000 square miles (16,000 km^{2}) of tribal territory, along the southern edge of Goyder Lagoon, and on the Warburton River, and Lakes Howitt and Berlino. The northern reach extended to Pandipandi and, over the border into what is now southwest Queensland, the area south of Birdsville and Miranda.

== Social organization and customs ==
Both circumcision and subincision were integral parts of Ngameni rites of initiation.

== Alternative names ==
- Ngamini, Ngaminni, Gnameni, Ngnaminni
- A:mini, Aumini, Auminie, Aumine, Amini
- Ominee
- Ahminie, Ahminnie
- Uminnie
- Agaminni
- Awmani

== Some words ==
- chookeroo (kangaroo)
- kinthalla (tame/wild dog)
- appurree (father)
- andree (mother)

== Sources ==
- "Aboriginal South Australia". Government of South Australia. Archived from the original on 1 May 2013.
- "AIATSIS map of Indigenous Australia". AIATSIS.
- Eylmann, Erhard (1908). Die Eingeborenen der Kolonie Südaustralien (PDF). Berlin: D.Reimer.
- Gason, Samuel (1879) [First published 1874]. "The Dieyerie tribe of Australian Aborigines". In Woods, J. D. (ed.). Native Tribes of South Australia. Adelaide: E. S. Wigg & Son. pp. 253–307.
- Gason, Samuel (1895). "Of the tribes, Dieyerie, Auminie, Yandrawontha, Yarawuarka, Pilladapa". Journal of the Anthropological Institute of Great Britain and Ireland. 24: 167–176. JSTOR 2842215.
- Helms, Richard (1896). "Anthropology of the Elder Exploring Expedition. 1871-1872". Transactions of the Royal Society of South Australia. 16. Adelaide: 237–332.
- Howitt, Alfred William (1891). "The Dieri and Other Kindred Tribes of Central Australia". The Journal of the Anthropological Institute of Great Britain and Ireland. 20: 30–104. doi:10.2307/2842347. JSTOR 2842347.
- Howitt, Alfred William (1904). The native tribes of south-east Australia. Macmillan Publishers.
- Howitt, Alfred William; Siebert, Otto (January–June 1904). "Legends of the Dieri and Kindred Tribes of Central Australia". The Journal of the Anthropological Institute of Great Britain and Ireland. 34: 100–129. doi:10.2307/2843089. JSTOR 2843089.
- Mathews, R. H. (January 1900a). "Divisions of the South Australian Aborigines". Proceedings of the American Philosophical Society. 39 (161): 78–91+93. JSTOR 983545.
- Mathews, R. H. (October–December 1900b). "Phallic Rites and Initiation Ceremonies of the South Australian Aborigines". Proceedings of the American Philosophical Society. 39 (164): 622–638. JSTOR 983778.
- Paull, W. J. (1886). "Warburton River" (PDF). In Curr, Edward Micklethwaite (ed.). The Australian race: its origin, languages, customs, place of landing in Australia and the routes by which it spread itself over the continent. Vol. 2. Melbourne: J. Ferres. pp. 18–21.
- Tindale, Norman Barnett (1974). "Ngameni (SA)". Aboriginal Tribes of Australia: Their Terrain, Environmental Controls, Distribution, Limits, and Proper Names. Australian National University Press. ISBN 978-0-708-10741-6.
