= Dhiraila =

Aboriginal Australian people

The Dhiraila (Thereila, Thiralla) were an Aboriginal Australian people of the state of Queensland.

== Language ==
According to Gavan Breen, the Thereila language was known as Mamwura or Mambanjura (Mambanyura).

== Country ==
Thereila tribal lands extended, according to Norman Tindale, over some 2,800 square miles (7,300 km^{2}). They lay south of Nockatunga and Noccundra, as far as the Grey Range. They were present at Dingera Creek. Their western confines were around Bransby and the lower Warrywarry Creek.

== Alternative names ==
- Thiralla
- Mambanjura
- Mambanyura
- Mambangura
- Mamwura
- Ngandangura

== Sources ==
- Myles, F.W. (1886). "Thargominda, Bulloo River" (PDF). In Curr, Edward Micklethwaite (ed.). The Australian race: its origin, languages, customs, place of landing in Australia and the routes by which it spread itself over the continent. Vol. 2. Melbourne: J. Ferres. pp. 36–41.
- Tindale, Norman Barnett (1974). "Thereila (QLD)". Aboriginal Tribes of Australia: Their Terrain, Environmental Controls, Distribution, Limits, and Proper Names. Australian National University Press.
