= Punthamara =

Aboriginal Australian people

The Punthamara were an indigenous Australian people of the state of Queensland.

== Country ==
According to Norman Tindale, the Punthamara's tribal territories embraced roughly 3,200 square miles (8,300 km^{2}), along the creeks flowing east of the Grey Range, whose western flank they lived about only as far as Mount Margaret and Congie. They were also present at Tobermorey, on the border with the present-day Northern Territory. Running north from Orient and Thargomindah, their lands approached the vicinity of Quilpie.

== History of contact ==
Punthamara lands and those of many other neighbouring tribes were pegged out and squatted by Patrick Durack, who took on several members of the tribe to serve him.

== Ethnography ==
The early ethnographer R. H. Mathews argued that the Punthamara were just one tribal group in a larger entity, which he called Wonkamurra Nation, consisting also of the Wongkumara, Kalali, Yandruwandha and Yauraworka. However, Tindale viewed the concept of such artificial supratribal "nations" with skepticism.

== Social organization and customs ==
Male	Female	Children (Note: Howitt citing J. H. Kirkham)
Gurgela	Giberugun	Wongo /Wongogun
Banbari	Wongogun	Guberu /Guberogun
Wongo	Banbarigun	Gurgela /Gurgelagun
Guberu	Gurgelagun	Banbari /Banbarigun

The Punthamara used circumcision in their initiatory rites, but refrained by subincision.

== Alternative names ==
- Bunthomarra
- Buntamara
- Buntamurra
- Banthamurra
- Buntha-burra
- Boonthamurra
- Boontha Murra

== Some words ==
- kuraba (pigweed variety of purslane) (Note: This species of purslaner had a large taproot, which was eaten by native tribes.)

== Sources ==
- Cameron, A. L. P. (1904). "Notes on a tribe speaking the "Boontha-Murra" language". Science of Man. 7 (6): 91–92.
- Durack, Mary (1971) [First published 1959]. Kings in Grass Castles. Corgi Books. pp. 108, 114, 129, 154, 321, 401.
- Greer, Germaine (2003). Whitefella jump up: The shortest way to Nationhood (PDF). Vol. 11. Quarterly Essay. pp. 1–78.
- Howitt, Alfred William (1904). The native tribes of south-east Australia (PDF). Macmillan.
- Mathews, R. H. (1898). "Divisions of Queensland aborigines". Proceedings of the American Philosophical Society. 37: 327–336.
- Mathews, R. H. (1905). "Ethnological notes on the aboriginal tribes of Queensland" (PDF). Queensland Geographical Journal. 29: 49–75.
- Myles, F.W. (1886). "Thargominda, Bulloo River" (PDF). In Curr, Edward Micklethwaite (ed.). The Australian race: its origin, languages, customs, place of landing in Australia and the routes by which it spread itself over the continent. Vol. 2. Melbourne: J. Ferres. pp. 36–41.
- Tindale, Norman Barnett (1974). "Punthamara (QLD)". Aboriginal Tribes of Australia: Their Terrain, Environmental Controls, Distribution, Limits, and Proper Names. Australian National University Press.
