= Badjiri =

Aboriginal Australian people of southern Queensland

The Badjiri people, also written Budjari or Badyidi, are an Australian Aboriginal people of just north of the Paroo River, close to the southern border of Queensland.

They are not to be confused with the Pitjara/Bidjara people of the Warrego River area or the Bidjara/Bitjara people of the Bulloo River area.

== Country ==
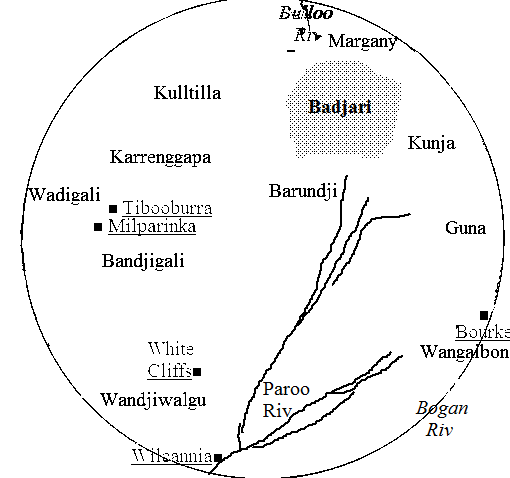
The traditional lands of the Badjari peoples of Western Queensland

According to Norman Tindale, the Badjiri lands spanned some 4,100 square miles (11,000 km^{2}), reaching from around Hungerford to Eulo on the Paroo River. Their eastern limits were around Barringun, Tinnenburra, Tuen, and Cunnamulla. They were also present at Caiwarro and about the eastern side of Currawinya.

== Language ==
The Badjiri people spoke the Badjiri language, now extinct.

== Alternative names ==
- Baderi
- Bädjäri
- Badjedi
- Badjeri, Baddyeri
- Badjidi
- Byjerri
- Poidgerry

Source: Tindale 1974, p. 164

== Sources ==
- Tindale, Norman Barnett (1974). "Badjiri (QLD)". Aboriginal Tribes of Australia: Their Terrain, Environmental Controls, Distribution, Limits, and Proper Names. Australian National University Press. Archived from the original on 18 April 2019.
