= Badjiri language =

Extinct Aboriginal Australian language of southern Queensland

Badjiri
- Budjari
- Native to: Australia
- Ethnicity: Badjiri
- Extinct: (date missing)
- Language family: Pama–Nyungan: Maric?; Badjiri

Language codes
- ISO 639-3: jbi
- Glottolog: badj1244
- AIATSIS: D31
- ELP: Badjiri

Badjiri is an extinct Aboriginal Australian language once spoken by the Badjiri people of southern Queensland.
