= Nockatunga Station =

Coordinates: 27.72183°S 142.71159°E

Location in Queensland

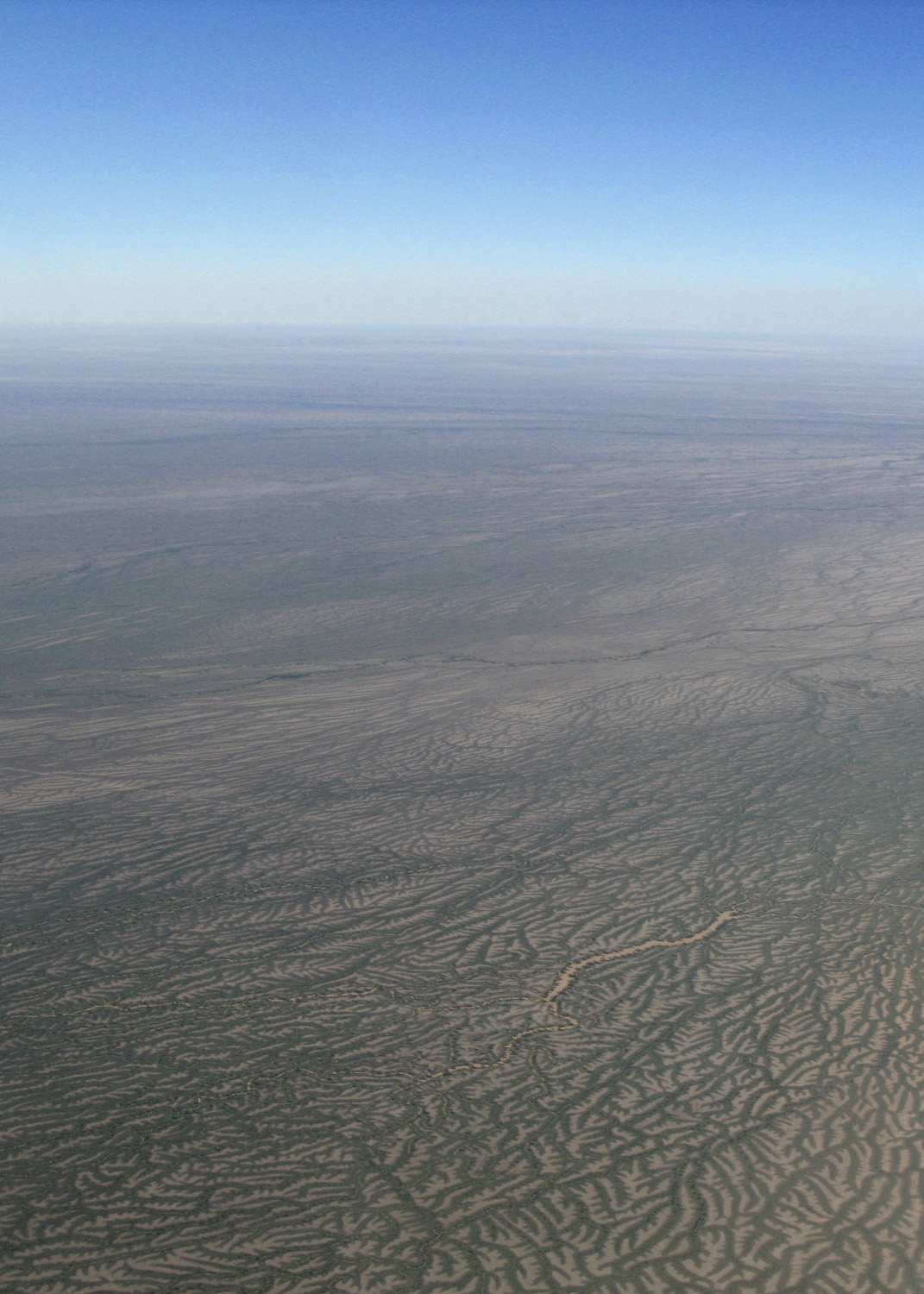
Overhead Channel Country near Cooper Creek

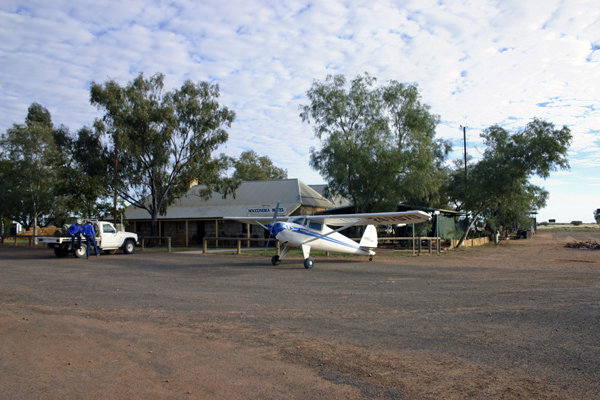
Noccundra hotel located on Nockatunga

Nockatunga Station, most commonly known as Nockatunga, is a pastoral lease that operates as a cattle station in South West Queensland, Australia.

== Description ==
Nockatunga is located about 195 kilometres (121 mi) east of Innamincka and 197 kilometres (122 mi) south west of Quilpie in Queensland. Situated in the channel country of outback Queensland the property includes frontage to the Wilson River.

Occupying an area well over 2 million acres, which is approximately 8,500 square kilometres (3,282 sq mi), almost the size as Puerto Rico with an area of 8,959 square kilometres (3,459 sq mi), the property is able to carry 30,000 head of cattle on a good season. The station is owned by the Harris family, trading under Cleveland Agriculture. Harris acquired the property in 2018 from Consolidated Pastoral Company, prior the Hughes family owned Nockatunga for 120 years. Noccundra Pub is located on the station, 20km from the station complex. The country is described as open bendee opening onto well grassed downs studded with water worn stones and lightly timbered with stunted gidyah. The open plains contain cotton bush and saltbush.

== History ==
The traditional owners of the area are the Kullili people of the Garlali language group, who have inhabited the area for thousands of years. The name of the property is thought to be derived from the Aboriginal words from the Theirila language Nock meaning water and tunga meaning smell.

The station was established in 1866 when Alexander Munro took up the lease but it soon changed hands and was owned in 1869 by Patrick Drinan.

The property was later put up for auction in 1872 and was advertised widely as a property of the "richest fattening quality", having 80 miles (129 km) frontage along the Wilson River, and occupying an area of 350 square miles (906 km^{2}). A herd of 6,500 cattle including 20 "well bred bulls" was included on the property that also claimed to have permanent waterholes "of sufficient depth to float the largest man'o'war", even during the severest drought.

Herbert Bristow Hughes acquired the station at auction in August 1872 for the sum of £19,655.

Explorers Hume, O'Hea and Thompson left Nockatunga to journey further down Cooper Creek and into the interior to search for the remains of the Leichhardt expedition in December 1874 and quickly ran out of water in the intense heat. Thompson left the other two to find water and help, but when he returned both had died of dehydration.

The property was advertised for auction again in 1875. Nockatunga was now 4,807 square kilometres (1,856 sq mi) or 1,188,000 acres in size and carrying a herd of about 13,000 cattle and 100 horses. The property had many improvements since being acquired including a stone cottage, stone kitchen, men's hut, grass and mud store, yards, sheds and blacksmith shop with 7 miles (11 km) of four wire fencing being installed. The auction was delayed then was unsuccessful as Hughes still owned the property in 1876 and beyond.

Flooding occurred at the station in 1882 following heavy rains for 6 days with 6 inches (152 mm) falling at nearby properties. The Wilson river rose leaving Nockatunga surrounded by water and parts being swept away. Many outbuildings constructed of mudbrick were washed away. The main buildings had the mortar dislodged from between the stones with flooding reaching a depth of 4 feet (1 m), making the buildings unstable. At the peak of the floods a horse wagon was caulked up and used as a raft to take supplies to higher ground.

Herbert Hughes died in 1892 in Adelaide, where he had long resided. The property was managed by a board of trustees until at least 1904; after that time the property was being run by John Maddock Hughes.

In 1901 drought struck much of south west Queensland with thousands of cattle dying of thirst at many properties. Nockatunga lost an estimated 27,897 cattle from a herd of approximately 30,000. Virtually no grasses remained on the ground as feed for stock. This was followed by a rabbit plague in 1905 when the pest had moved northwards and bred to plague proportions in the channel country reducing available feed for cattle.

By 1910 Nockatunga was the second largest station in Queensland, having an area of 2,900 square miles (7,511 km^{2}). The largest at this time was Sandringham Station in the north Gregory district having an area of 3,033 square miles (7,855 km^{2}).

Following a period of drought, the area experienced heavy rains in 1926 when 6.6 inches (168 mm) of rain fell over a few days. The Wilson River was the highest it had been in over 20 years and Cooper Creek was running at over 14 miles (23 km) wide.

The dingo population had increased and the property used 400 aborigines to cull the population. At Nockatunga over 713 dingos and their pups were slaughtered in the first six months of 1933.

The manager of the property in 1935 was Lucas Hughes, one of the Hughes family and on the board of trustees of H. B. Hughes. According to him decent rains had not been had at Nockatunga since 1926.

Hughes organised the construction of an airfield at Nockatunga in 1941 using 50 aborigines close to the homestead on a gibber plain. The working party took two days to clear the loose rocks and any brush along the 600 metres (1,969 ft) landing strip. The rocks were then placed around the aerodrome and the station was accessible to the Royal Flying Doctor Service.

The station found itself isolated in 1947 following record flooding. Both the station and the township of Noccundra were completely cut off and had no mail from late December 1946 to late February 1947.

An unfortunate stockman, George Dirkensen, fell into an open fire in January 1949 burning his hands, face and arms. He was over the river from the homestead but was unable to cross it and his cries were not noticed until the following morning. He was taken to Broken Hill later that day by the Royal Flying Doctor Service.

The station had record rainfalls in 1949 when in the month of March a total of 21 inches (533 mm) fell compared to an annual average of 5 inches (127 mm).

The record of the most cattle sent to Homebush market by one owner, H.B. Hughes Estate, was set in 1951 when 654 cattle from Nockatunga arrived. The herd had been overlanded to Bourke and then trucked to Flemington.

== Noccundra ==
The townsite of Noccundra was established in 1882 and is located within the station boundaries, the only part that remains being the Noccundra Hotel. The licence for the hotel was first granted in 1886 and the hotel was built using locally quarried sandstone which was brought to the site by camel train. Besides being used for entertainment and accommodation the building serves as a medical and dental clinic for the Royal Flying Doctor Service as required. The building was heritage listed in 1977.

== See also ==
- List of ranches and stations
- List of the largest stations in Australia
