= Yandruwandha language =

Extinct Australian Aboriginal language

Yandruwandha
- Native to: Australia
- Region: South Australia, Queensland
- Ethnicity: Yandruwandha people, Yawarrawarrka
- Extinct: since 1973?
- Language family: Pama–Nyungan: Karnic; Karna; Yandruwandha
- Dialects: Yandruwanhdha; Yawarrawarrka; Nhirrpi; Parlpa-Mardramardra; Matja

Language codes
- ISO 639-3: Variously: ynd – Yandruwandha yww – Yawarawarga hrp – Nhirrpi
- Glottolog: yand1252 Yandruwandhic
- AIATSIS: L18
- ELP: Yandruwandha
- Yawarrawarrka
- Nhirrpi

Yandruwandha is an Australian Aboriginal language of the Pama–Nyungan family. Yawarawarga is considered a dialect by Dixon (2002), a closely related language by Bowern (2001). It is also known as Yawarrawarrka, Yawarawarka, Yawarawarga, Yawarawarka, Jauraworka, and Jawarawarka).

The traditional language region includes Far Western Queensland around the local government area of the Shire of Diamantina extending into the Outback Communities Authority of South Australia towards Innamincka.

== Phonology ==
=== Consonants ===
		Peripheral		Laminal		Apical	
		Labial	Velar	Dental	Palatal	Alveolar	Retroflex
Plosive	voiceless	p	k	t̪	c	t	ʈ
Plosive	voiced	b	ɡ	d̪	ɟ	d	ɖ
Plosive	trill-release					dʳ	ɖʳ
Nasal		m	ŋ	n̪	ɲ	n	ɳ
Rhotic						r	
Lateral	glide			l̪	ʎ	l	ɭ
Lateral	prestopped			(ᵈ̪l̪)		(ᵈl)	(^{ɖ}ɭ)
Approximant		w			j		ɻ

- Lateral sounds /l̪, l, ɭ/ can also be heard as prestopped [ᵈ̪l̪, ᵈl, ^{ɖ}ɭ] when occurring after a stressed vowel.

=== Vowels ===
	Front	Central	Back
High	i		u
Low		a aː	
