= Wilson River (Queensland) =

Wilson
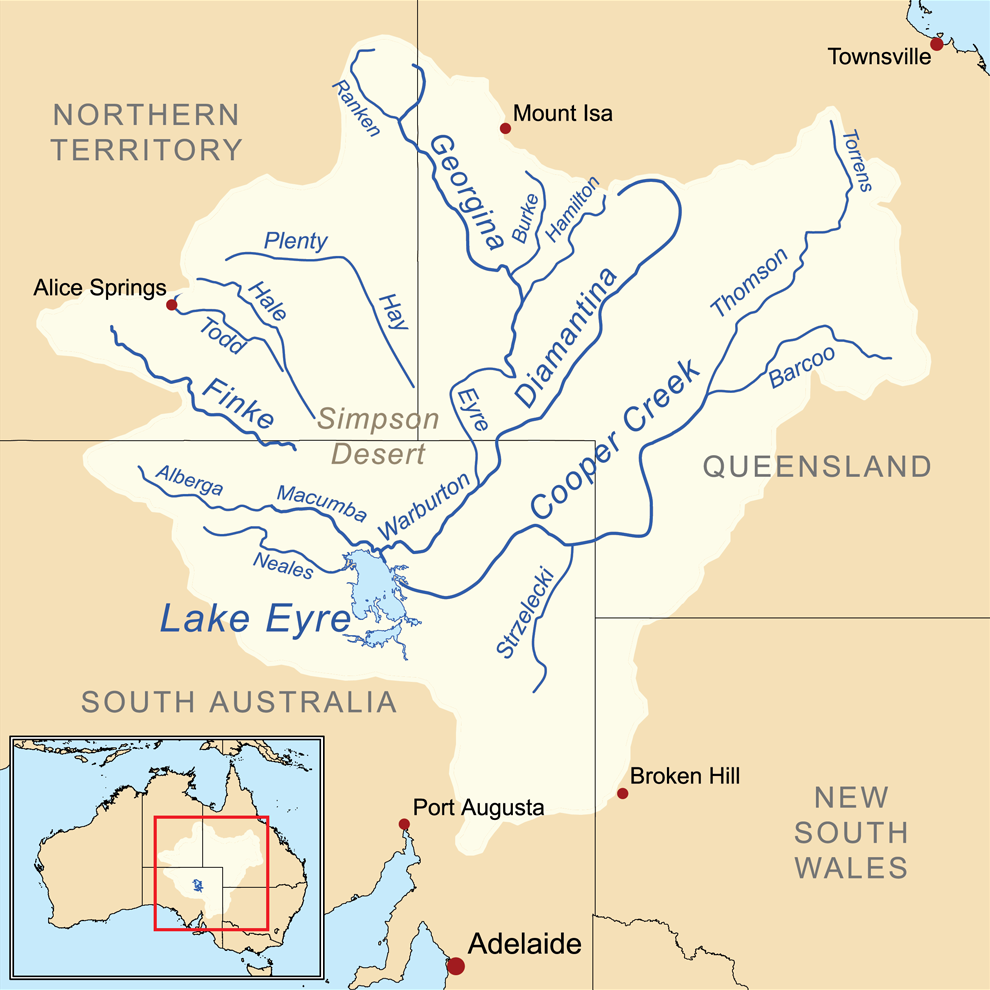
- Map of the Lake Eyre basin

- Location of the river mouth in Queensland

Location
- Country: Australia
- State: Queensland
- Region: Channel Country, Western Qld

Physical characteristics
- Source: Grey Range
  - location: Oonagie Sandhill
  - elevation: 69 m (226 ft)
- Mouth: confluence with the Cooper Creek
  - location: Depot Camp (Camp 63)
  - coordinates: 27°48′S 142°11′E
  - elevation: 27 m (89 ft)
- Length: 28 km (17 mi)

Basin features
- River system: Lake Eyre basin
- Tributaries
  - left: Tookabarnoo Creek, Nockanoora Creek
- Waterhole: Nockanoora

The Wilson River, part of the Lake Eyre Basin, is an ephemeral river in the Channel Country in western Queensland, Australia.

The Wilson River rises on the slopes of the Grey Range and flows generally northwest through the Nockanoora (or Noccundra) waterhole and is joined by two minor tributaries before reaching its confluence with the Cooper Creek at what was known as Depot Camp (Camp 63). The river descends 8 metres (26 ft) over its 28-kilometre (17 mi) course.

It is believed that Burke and Wills first found water on the Macleay Plains and crossed Cooper Creek near its junction with the Wilson River, on 11 November 1860.

== See also ==
- List of rivers of Australia § Queensland
