= Galali people =

Aboriginal Australian people

The Galali or Kalali were an Indigenous Australian people of the state of Queensland.

== Language ==
Garlali is now extinct, but some outlines of the language were written out by Nils Holmer, Maryalyce McDonald and Stephen Wurm. The language is currently in the process of being revived by brothers Toby Adams and Daryl Docherty as part of the Kullilli Ngulkana language revival initiative.

The Garlali spoke two languages, the Bulloo River language and the Wilson River language, both shared with other peoples.

== Country ==
According to an estimate by Norman Tindale Kalali tribal territory stretched over some 4,800 square miles (12,000 km^{2}). Proceeding west from Eulo to Thargomindah and the Bulloo River, and upstream as far as Norley. Their southern extension went as far as, Clyde, Orient and Currawinya.

The descendants of the Kalali speakers mostly live in Brisbane, Cherbourg (the old Aboriginal Mission), and small New South Wales and Queensland towns such as Bourke, Thargomindah, Cunnamulla, and Charleville.

== Social organization and customs ==
The Kalali practised neither circumcision nor subincision.

== Alternative names ==
- Galali
- Kullali
- Kullally
- Kalili (? typo)

Following Breen, these have sometimes been spelled Garlali, Galarli, etc., but the retroflex rl does not seem to be distinctive and so should not be written (Breen 2007:191 Reassessing Karnic).

== Sources ==
- Holmer, Nils M. (1988). Punthamara: With comparative notes on Kalali. In Notes on some Queensland languages. Pacific Linguistics. pp. 129–167.
- Mathews, R. H. (January 1900). "Divisions of the South Australian Aborigines". Proceedings of the American Philosophical Society. 39 (161): 78–91+93. JSTOR 983545.
- McDonald, Maryalyce; Wurm, Stephen A (1979). Basic materials in Wangkumara (Galali): grammar, sentences and vocabulary. Canberra: Pacific Linguistics.
- Myles, F.W. (1886). "Thargominda, Bulloo River" (PDF). In Curr, Edward Micklethwaite (ed.). The Australian race: its origin, languages, customs, place of landing in Australia and the routes by which it spread itself over the continent. Vol. 2. Melbourne: J. Ferres. pp. 36–41.
- Tindale, Norman Barnett (1974). "Kalali (QLD)". Aboriginal Tribes of Australia: Their Terrain, Environmental Controls, Distribution, Limits, and Proper Names. Australian National University Press.
