= Große Isar =

Große Isar may refer to two different branches of the river Isar in Bavaria, Germany:

- Große Isar (Munich), in the town of Munich
- Große Isar (Landshut), in the town of Landshut
