= Kleine Isar =

Kleine Isar may refer to two different branches of the river Isar in Bavaria, Germany:

- Kleine Isar (Munich), in the town of Munich
- Kleine Isar (Landshut), in the town of Landshut
