= Clifton Hills Station =

Pastoral lease in South Australia

Coordinates: 27.01832°S 138.89347°E

Location in South Australia

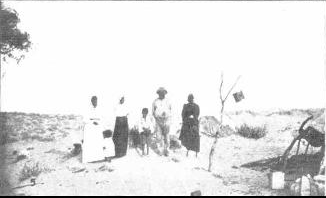
Group of Indigenous Australians at Clifton Hills Station in 1921

Clifton Hills Station is a pastoral lease that operates as a cattle station in the far north of South Australia.

== Description ==
It is situated approximately 132 kilometres (82 mi) south of Birdsville and 200 kilometres (124 mi) north west of Innamincka. The property encompasses part of the Sturt Stony Desert and is located on the Birdsville Track and is the largest holding along the track with an area of 17,000 square kilometres (6,564 sq mi).

Goyder Lagoon, the origin of the Warburton River and the end of the Diamantina River and Eyre Creek, lies on the edge of the property.

== History ==
The station was established in 1876. In 1881 the property was owned by J. H. Howie who had 1,000 cattle overlanded from Aramac Station. By 1883 the property was owned by Andrew and J. Broad who were routinely sending cattle to market in Adelaide. By 1891 the property was still owned by the Broads but managed by Mr. Turnbull. At this stage the property occupied an area of 4,000 square miles (10,360 km^{2}) and was stocked with 14,000 head of cattle.

In 1904 the manager was H.C. Trew who reported that the Georgina and Diamantina Rivers had emptied themselves onto the plains of the station covering come 2,099 square miles (5,436 km^{2}) and the property was carrying 2,000 head of cattle.

Clifton Hills was sold by Elder Smith and Co on behalf of the then proprietors in early July 1912. The purchasers, G and E.A. Brooks, had substantial existing holdings, including Buckland Park at Two Wells, north of Adelaide. At the time, the property was described as consisting of 3,566 square miles (9,236 km^{2}) and carrying 9,000 head of cattle, 168 horses and being sold on a walk-in / walk out basis.

The Beltana Pastoral Company sold the property Kanowna Station to G. and E. A. Brooks who already owned Clifton Hills, which adjoins Kanowna, in 1914.

In 1923 both Clifton Hills and nearby Kanowana Station were still owned by G and E. A. Brooks. The holdings had a combined area of 7,000,000 acres (28,328 km^{2}) and were stocked with approximately 20,000 head of shorthorn cattle.

In 1930 the manager was Norman Gurr who reported that the rivers had flooded, that largest floods seen in the area since 1917.

Hector Brooks owned the property in 1960 and was the first to sell cattle at Gepps Cross using the beef roads concept. The cattle, a consignment of 53 bullocks, were transported by truck down the Birdsville Track to the railhead at Marree. This was the first time road transport had been used along the track.

The land occupying the extent of the Clifton Hills pastoral lease was gazetted as a locality in April 2013 under the name 'Clifton Hills Station' with the word 'Station' included to "prevent duplication of locality name within Australia.

The property was offered for sale in 2018, reported to be for the first time in 60 years. It was described as the second-largest cattle station on Earth (after Anna Creek Station), at 16,510 square kilometres (6,370 sq mi) stocked with an estimated 18,000 head of cattle, and licensed for up to 21,500. It consists of 1,500 square kilometres (580 sq mi) annual flood area from the Diamantina River, balanced with gibber plains with creeks, and soft sandhill country. The selling owners were David Harvey, Charles Simpson and Katherine Hartley. Clifton Hills Station encompassed four pastoral leases in northeastern South Australia and southwestern Queensland. In late November 2018, it emerged that the station would be bought by a partnership including Viv Oldfield who already owned the adjoining Pandie Pandie Station and also bought Maryvale Station earlier in 2018. The purchase included 18,000 certified organic cattle. His cattle enterprise runs about 50,000 cattle on a collection of stations including Andado Station, Horseshoe Bend Station, and New Crown Station.

== See also ==
- List of ranches and stations
- List of the largest stations in Australia
