= Officer Creek =

Officer
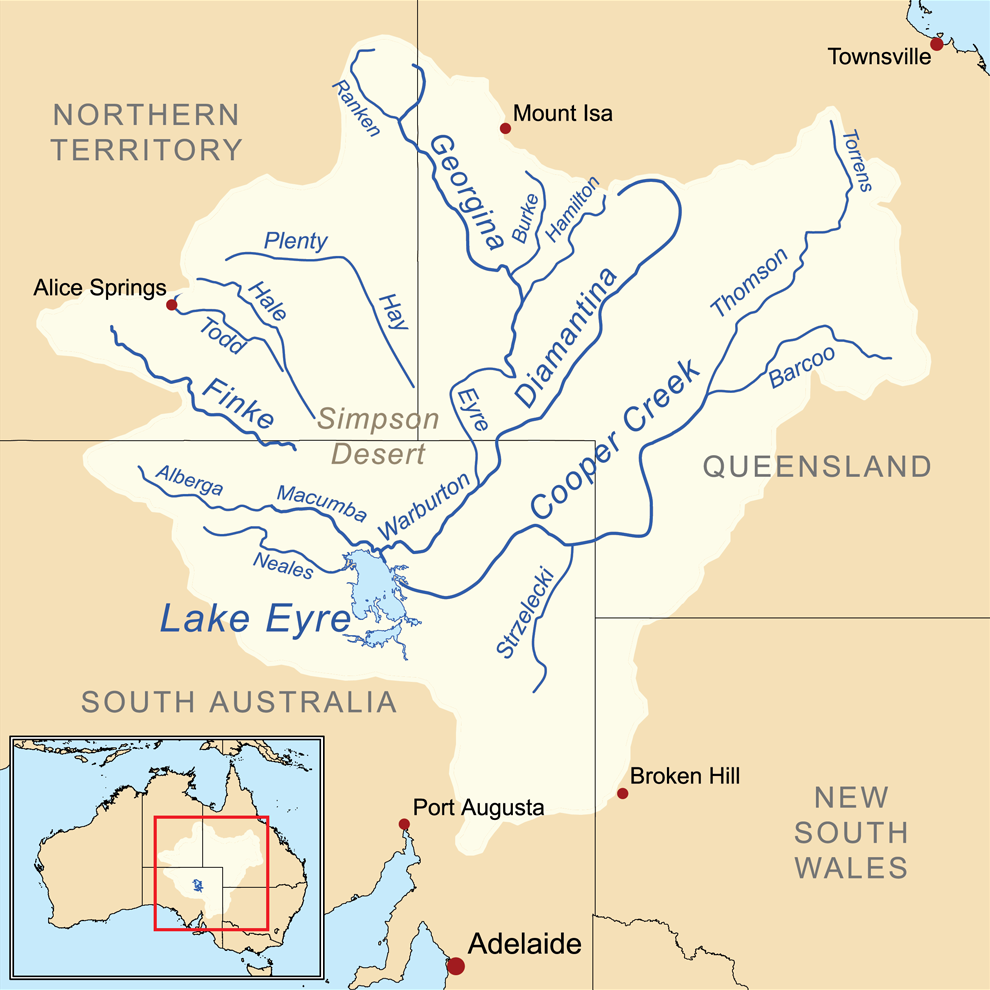
- Map of the Lake Eyre Basin showing Warburton River

Location
- Country: Australia
- State: South Australia
- Region: Far North
- Settlement: Kaltjiti

Physical characteristics
- Source: Musgrave Ranges
  - elevation: 619 m (2,031 ft)
- Mouth: Warburton River
  - coordinates: 27°40′S 132°19′E
  - elevation: 388 m (1,273 ft)
- Length: 200 km (120 mi)

Basin features
- River system: Lake Eyre Basin
- Tributaries
  - left: Wallinna (Apayatiyanya) Creek
  - right: Currie (Aliwanyiwanyinya) Creek

The Officer Creek, part of the Lake Eyre basin, is an ephemeral watercourse in the Far North region in the Australian state of South Australia.

The creek rises in the Musgrave Ranges and flows through the Aboriginal community of Kaltjiti in the Anangu Pitjantjatjara Yankunytjatjara Lands. With the Ammaroodinna and Currie Creeks, the creek empties into the Warburton River.

Officer Creek is usually a dry sandy bed and only flows at times of very high rainfall.

== History ==
In September 1873 during his second trip into the South Australian interior, Ernest Giles and another party member, William Tietkens, encountered 200 Aboriginal males. The Europeans fired shots, allegedly in retaliation for the throwing of spears. The Europeans escaped unharmed - there is no mention of Aboriginal casualties. Giles later acknowledged that Aboriginal aggression was usually due to white trespass on black land. Giles named the river where this occurred "The Officer", by which it was known until the 1930s when it was renamed Officer Creek. Officer Creek took its name from the surname of one of the donors towards Giles' expedition that he wished to honour in that way.

== See also ==
- List of rivers of Australia § South Australia
