= Kleine Isar (Munich) =

River in Germany

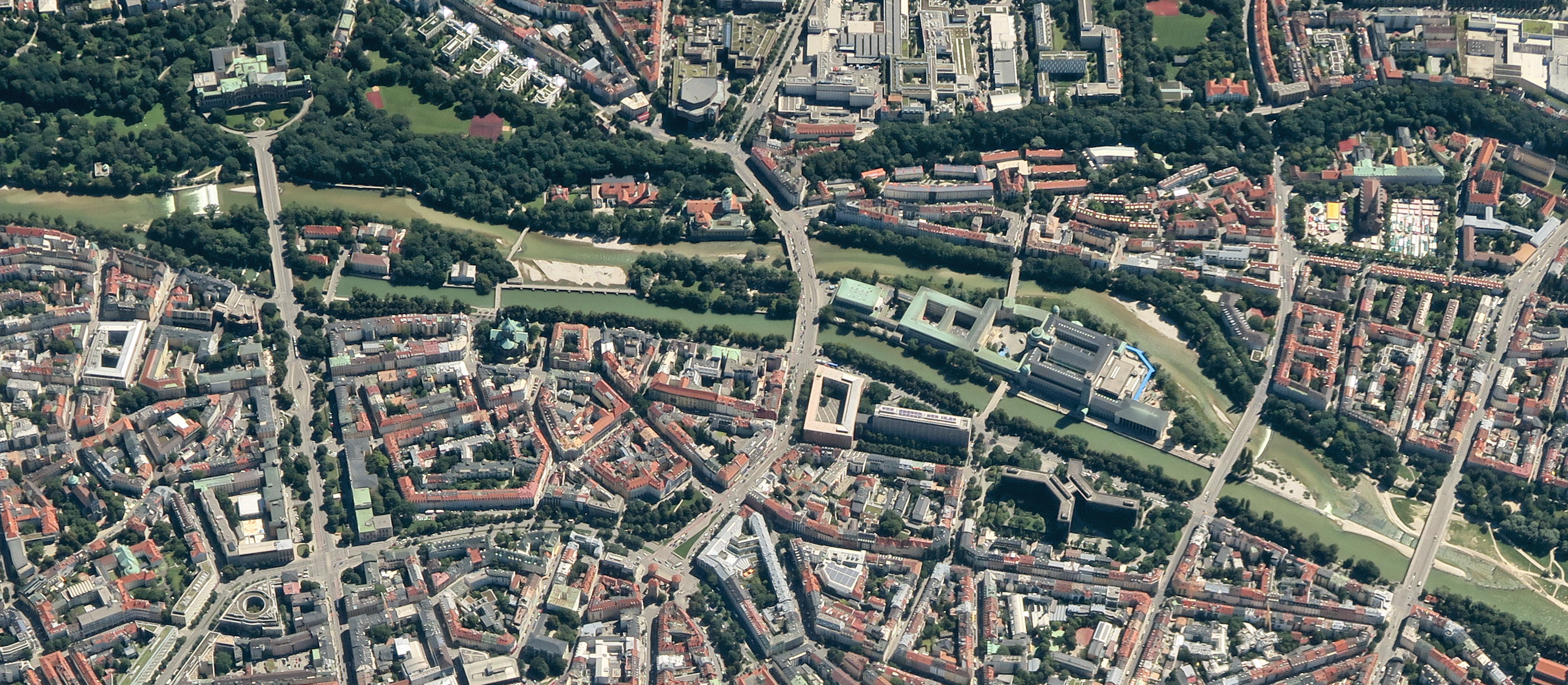
- Aerial view of the Isar in Munich: the Prater Island left, the Museum Island right, above the Kleine Isar, below the Große Isar

Location
- Country: Germany
- State: Bavaria

Physical characteristics
- Mouth
  - coordinates: 48.1385°N 11.5927°E

The Kleine Isar is a short stretch of river in Munich, Bavaria, Germany. It is an anabranch of the Isar, that is to say it diverges from the main stream and rejoins it further down. It is separated from the main stream by two aits joined by a footbridge.

== See also ==
- List of rivers of Bavaria
