= Wangkangurru =

Aboriginal Australian people of South Australia

The Wangkangurru, also written Wongkanguru and Wangkanguru, are an Aboriginal Australian people of the Simpson Desert area in the state of South Australia. They also refer to themselves as Nharla.

== Country ==
Norman Tindale estimated their tribal sway as extending over 14,000 square miles (36,000 km^{2}), taking in the area from Stevenson Creek northwards to Mount Dare. To the east they were at Macumba Creek. The Wangkangurru were also present on the lower reaches of the Finke River. The southern section of the Arunta (Simpson) Desert also formed part of their territory, while to the southeast, their boundaries ran as far as Kallakoopah Creek and the Warburton River. Blood Creek and Atna Hill also lay on Wangkangurru lands.

=== Native title ===
The Wangkangurru now form an aggregate with the Yarluyandi, and are represented by the Wangkangurru Yarluyandi Aboriginal Corporation. Their native title over a large area of the Simpson Desert was recognised in 2014.

== Language ==
The Wangkangurru language, like the majority of Aboriginal Australian languages, falls into the Pama-Nyungan classification.

The self-referential term Nharla, relating to their language subgroup, is the Arabana word for "man".

== Notable people ==
- Mick McLean (Irinyili) (b.1888-d.1977) was an outstanding "man of high degree" (minpari), whose erudition regarding the country, languages and culture of northern South Australia - the traditional song cycles and lore extending from the Simpson Desert and Dalhousie in the north to Port Augusta and Murnpeowie in the south, from the westernly Indulkana eastwards as far as Innamincka was highly prized by ethnographers such as Luise Hercus. Aside from English, he was fluent in five Aboriginal languages, a master of Wangkangurru, Arabana and the southern variety of Arrernte, as well as exhibiting a competency in both Diyari and Antakarinya.

== Some words ==
- minparu (Man of high degree/clever man/medicine man)

== Alternative names ==
- Wangkanguru (Yankuntjatjarra pronunciation)
- Wongkongaru, Wonkanguru, Wonkobbbbnguru
- Ongkongura
- Wongkaooroo, Wonkgongaru, Wonkongaru, Wonkaoora
- Wongonooroo, Wonkongnuru, (Note: "Another recorder who had possible hearing defects, or lapses in transcription techniques, was R. Helms (1895). In his account of the aborigines encountered during the Elder Exploring Expedition, he heard [ij] as [gn] and was seemingly tone deaf to initial [n] and [nj] sounds. Thus he gave Yunga for Njunga, Wonkongnuru for Wongkanguru, .." (Tindale 1974, p. 154)) Wonkagnurra, Wonkanooroo
- Unganoora
- Känguru (abbreviation)
- Gongaru
- Partama (Gugadja exonym)
- Wingkungira (Iliaura exonym)

== Sources ==
- "AIATSIS map of Indigenous Australia". AIATSIS. 28 July 2023.
- Eylmann, Erhard (1908). Die Eingeborenen der Kolonie Südaustralien (PDF). Berlin: D.Reimer.
- Gason, Samuel (1879) [First published 1874]. "The Dieyerie tribe of Australian Aborigines". In Woods, J. D. (ed.). Native Tribes of South Australia. Adelaide: E. S. Wigg & Son. pp. 253–307.
- Helms, Richard (1895). "Anthropology of the Elder Exploring Expedition. 1871-1872". Transactions of the Royal Society of South Australia. 16. Adelaide: 237–332.
- Horne, G. A.; Aiston, G. (1924). Savage life in Central Australia (PDF). London: Macmillan.
- Howitt, Alfred William (1904). The native tribes of south-east Australia (PDF). Macmillan.
- Howitt, Alfred William; Siebert, Otto (January–June 1904). "Legends of the Dieri and Kindred Tribes of Central Australia". Journal of the Anthropological Institute of Great Britain and Ireland. 34. Adelaide: 100–129. doi:10.2307/2843089. JSTOR 2843089.
- Mathews, R. H. (January 1900a). "Divisions of the South Australian Aborigines". Proceedings of the American Philosophical Society. 39 (161): 78–91+93. JSTOR 983545.
- Mathews, R. H. (October–December 1900b). "Phallic Rites and Initiation Ceremonies of the South Australian Aborigines". Proceedings of the American Philosophical Society. 39 (164): 622–638. JSTOR 983778.
- McCaul, Kim (2016). "The making of a Simpson Desert clever man". In Austin, Peter K.; Koch, Harold; Simpson, Jane (eds.). Language, Land and Song. London: EL Publishing. pp. 344–357.
- Pauli, W. J. (1886). "Warburton River" (PDF). In Curr, Edward Micklethwaite (ed.). The Australian race: its origin, languages, customs, place of landing in Australia and the routes by which it spread itself over the continent. Vol. 2. Melbourne: J. Ferres. pp. 18–21.
- Spencer, Sir Baldwin; Gillen, Francis J. (1904). Northern Tribes of Central Australia (PDF). Macmillan Publishers.
- Strehlow, Carl (1910). Die Aranda- und Loritja-stämme in Zentral-Australien (PDF) (in German). Vol. 3. Frankfurt am Main: Städtisches Völker-Museum.
- Tindale, Norman Barnett (1974). "Wongkanguru (SA)". Aboriginal Tribes of Australia: Their Terrain, Environmental Controls, Distribution, Limits, and Proper Names. Australian National University Press. ISBN 978-0-708-10741-6.
- Yallop, C. L. (1969). "The Aljawara and Their Territory". Oceania. 39 (3): 187–197. doi:10.1002/j.1834-4461.1969.tb01005.x. JSTOR 40329775.
