= Maireana scleroptera =

Scientific classification
- Kingdom: Plantae
- Clade: Tracheophytes
- Clade: Angiosperms
- Clade: Eudicots
- Order: Caryophyllales
- Family: Amaranthaceae
- Genus: Maireana
- Species: M. scleroptera

Binomial name
- Maireana scleroptera (J.M.Black) Paul G.Wilson

Synonyms
- Kochia scleroptera J.M.Black

Species of plant

Maireana scleroptera, commonly known as hard-wing bluebush, is a species of flowering plant in the family Amaranthaceae and is endemic to arid parts of inland Australia. It is a prostrate to erect perennial with narrowly oblong to narrowly egg-shaped leaves, pairs of densely woolly bisexual flowers, and a cartilaginous to woody hemispherical fruiting perianth with five broadly oblong, horizontal wings.

== Description ==
Maireana scleroptera is a prostrate to erect perennial with a woody base, up to 30 cm (12 in) high with slender branches covered with woolly hairs. The leaves are arranged alternately, narrowly oblong to narrowly egg-shaped with the narrower end towards the base, usually 5–10 mm (0.20–0.39 in) long and covered with silky hairs to almost glabrous. The flowers are bisexual and arranged in pairs and densely woolly, with a convex, ribbed tube, about 2 mm (0.079 in) in diameter. The fruiting perianth has five cartilaginous, broadly oblong, horizontal wings 1–2 mm (0.039–0.079 in) long, the upper perianth open in the centre, thick and hard, forming a disc-shaped rim.

== Taxonomy and naming ==
This species was first formally described in 1919 by John McConnell Black who gave it the name Kochia scleroptera in the Transactions and Proceedings of the Royal Society of South Australia, from specimens collected near the Arkaringa and Alberga Creeks. In 1975, Paul Wilson transferred the species to Maireana as M. scleroptera in the journal Nuytsia.

== Distribution and habitat ==
Maireana scleroptera is found in the Central Ranges and Great Victoria Desert bioregions of South Australia and Western Australia, the Finke bioregion of South Australia and the Northern Territory, the Stony Plains bioregion of South Australia and the Gascoyne and Gibson Desert bioregions of Western Australia. It grows in loamy soils on plains and claypans.
