= Große Isar (Munich) =

River in Germany

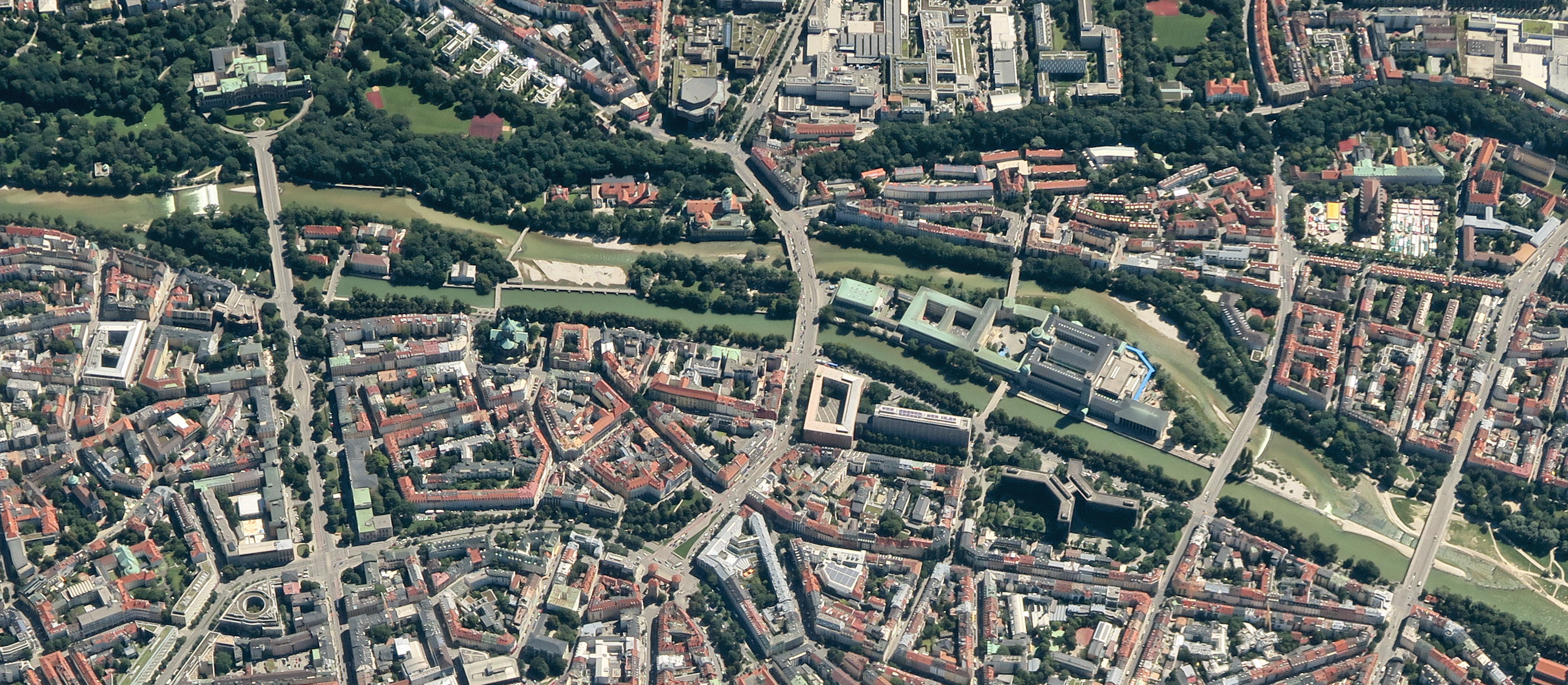
- Aerial view of the Isar in Munich: the Prater Island left, the Museum Island right, above the Kleine Isar, below the Große Isar

Location
- Country: Germany
- States: Bavaria

Physical characteristics
- Mouth
  - coordinates: 48.1385°N 11.5927°E

The Große Isar is a short stretch of river in Munich, Bavaria, Germany. It is the main stem of the Isar where it diverges from its anabranch Kleine Isar and later rejoins with it. It is separated from the Kleine Isar by two aits joined by a footbridge.

== See also ==
- List of rivers of Bavaria
