= Kohlenschiffhafen =

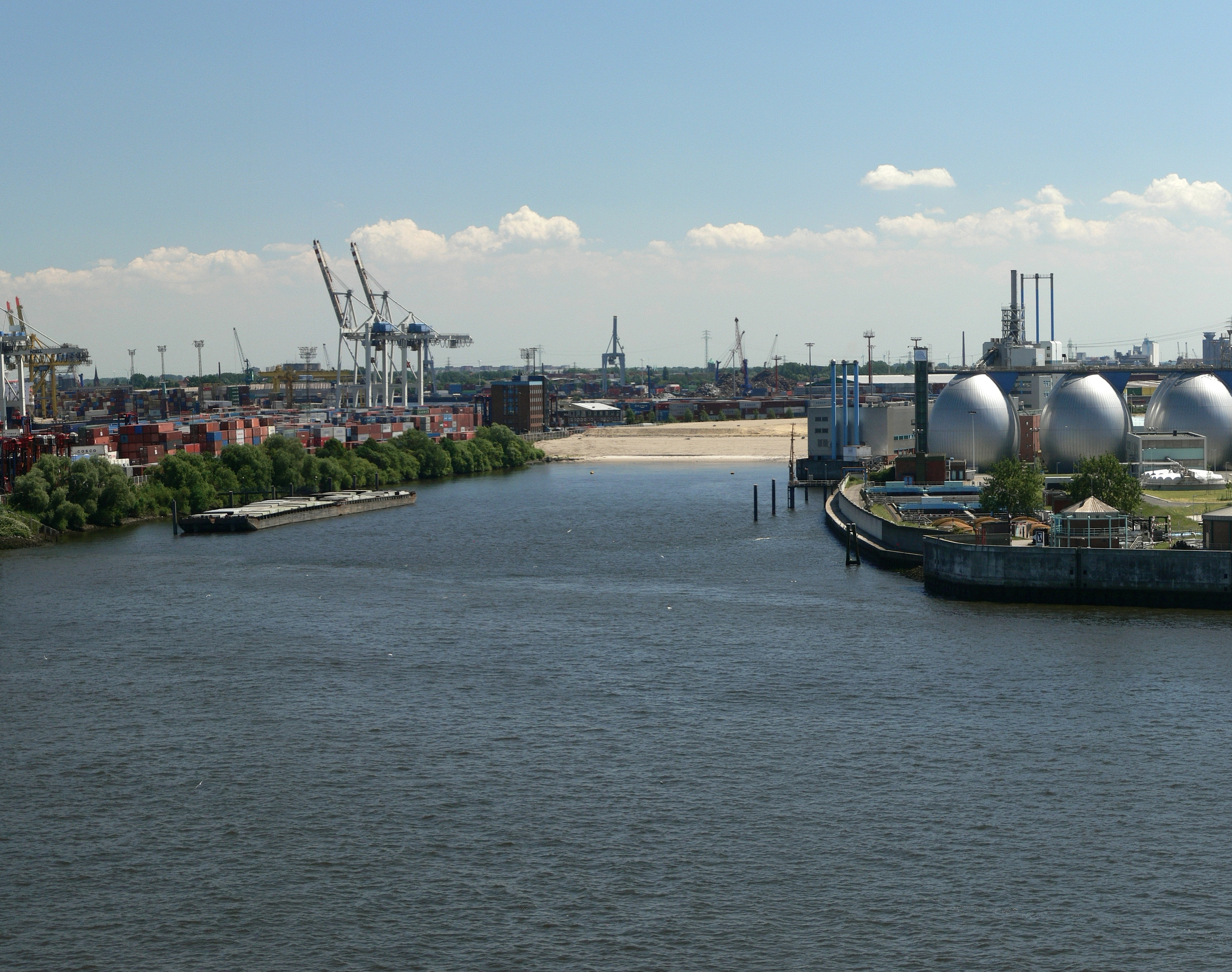
- Kohlenschiffhafen in 2009
- Click on the map for a fullscreen view

Location
- Country: Germany
- Location: Port of Hamburg
- Coordinates: 53.5378°N 9.9417°E

Details
- Opened: 1920
- Type of harbour: Harbour basin

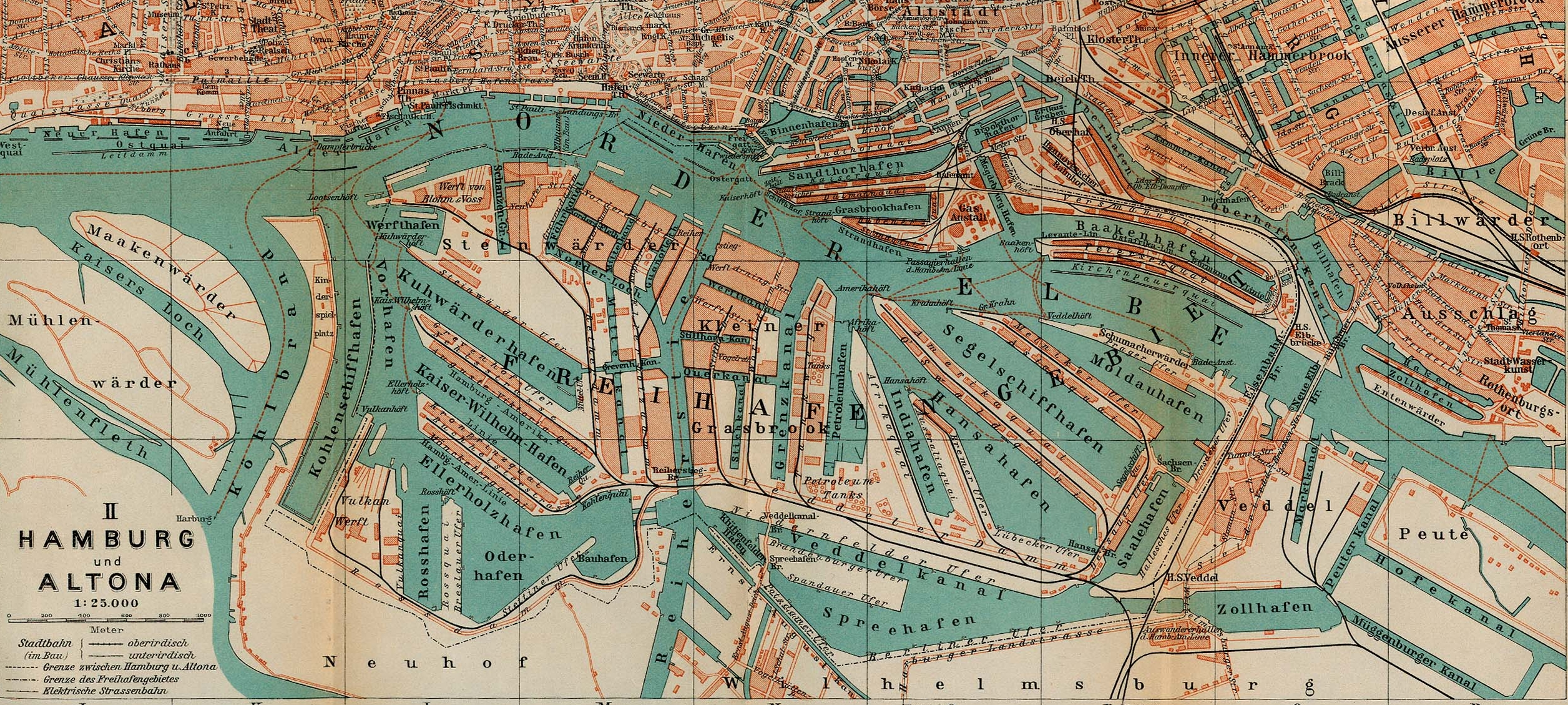
Map of Hamburg port in 1910, already showing the completed Kohlenschiffhafen near Köhlbrand (to the left). Another source reports its completion only around 1920

Kohlenschiffhafen (Coal ship harbour) is a harbour basin of the port of Hamburg, Germany, connected with the Norderelbe anabranch of River Elbe. It is located between the promontories of Köhlbrandhöft to the west and Tollerort to the east. It marks the former mouth of the Köhlbrand anabranch into the Norderelbe.

== History ==
After the third Köhlbrand treaty between Hamburg and Prussia, works began to relocate the Köhlbrand anabranch 600 metres (2,000 ft) to the west. The former pathway is marked by the Kohlenschiffhafen, which was completed around 1920. Initially it had a length of approximately 1.2 kilometres (0.75 mi).

The harbour basin was filled up with sand since 2002. The expanded Container Terminal Tollerort can be found on the largely filled in harbour basin today. Works are underway in 2016 to fill up the small rest of the basin.
