= Alberga River =

River in South Australia

Alberga Alberga Creek
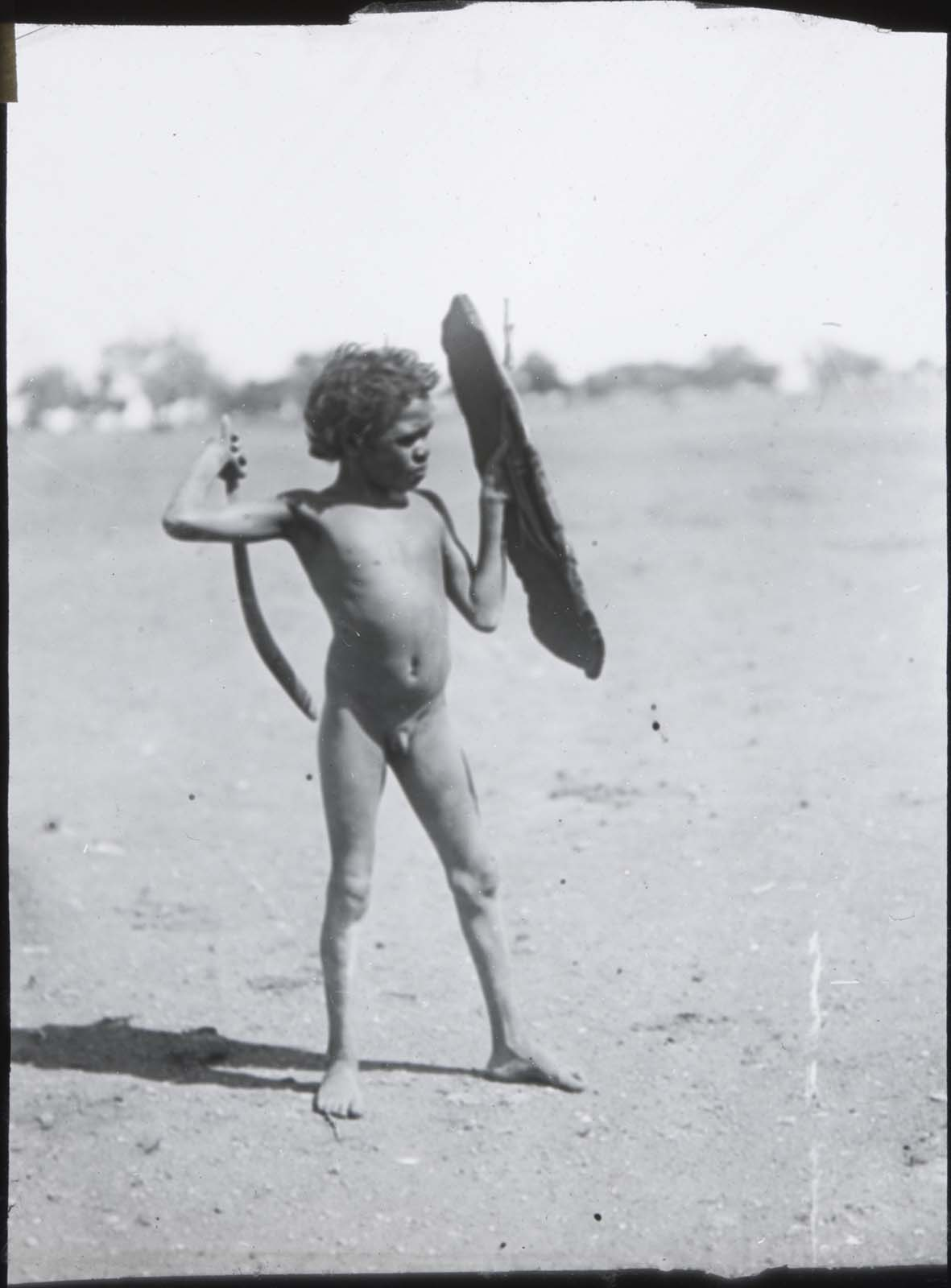
- An Arrernte boy practicing with a toy shield and boomerang at Alberga Creek, 1920. (Source: National Museum of Australia)

- Location of the river mouth in South Australia

Location
- Country: Australia
- State: South Australia
- Region: Far North
- Settlement: Macumba

Physical characteristics
- Source
  - location: north of Indulkana
  - elevation: 465 m (1,526 ft)
- Mouth: confluence with the Macumba River
  - location: near Alberga
  - coordinates: 27°06′15″S 135°31′47″E
  - elevation: 110 m (360 ft)
- Length: 690 km (430 mi)

Basin features
- River system: Lake Eyre Basin
- Tributaries
  - left: Marryat Creek
  - right: Eateringinna Creek, Agnes Creek, Tarcoonyinna Creek, Indulkana Creek, Yoolperlunna Creek, Warrungadinna Creek, Kathleen Creek
- Waterholes: Oorarin Waterhole; Armina Waterhole; Kilkirkina Waterhole

The Alberga River, also known as the Alberga Creek, is an ephemeral river that is part of the Lake Eyre basin located in the Far North region of the Australian state of South Australia.

== Course and features ==
The river rises near Indulkana, north of the Oodnadatta Track and about 40 kilometres (25 mi) northwest of the town of Oodnadatta and northeast of Marla. The Alberga generally flows east by south, joined by eight minor tributaries and three waterholes before reaching its confluence with the Macumba River near the town of Alberga. The river descends 355 metres (1,165 ft) over its 690-kilometre (430 mi) course.

The river is crossed by The Ghan near its source.

== History ==
=== European history ===
The Alberga River was discovered on 23 March 1860 by John McDouall Stuart, who considered it to be a branch of the Neales River. The river was named by William Christie Gosse in 1873. It is also known as Alberga Creek.

It was a junction between the central and southern sections on the Australian Overland Telegraph Line between the coasts of Australia. The southern section, between Port Augusta and Alberga Creek, was contracted to Edward Meade Bagot in 1870. The overland telegraph was completed on 22 May 1872.

== See also ==
- List of rivers of Australia § South Australia
