= City Barrage, Wrocław =

Barrage in Wrocław, Poland

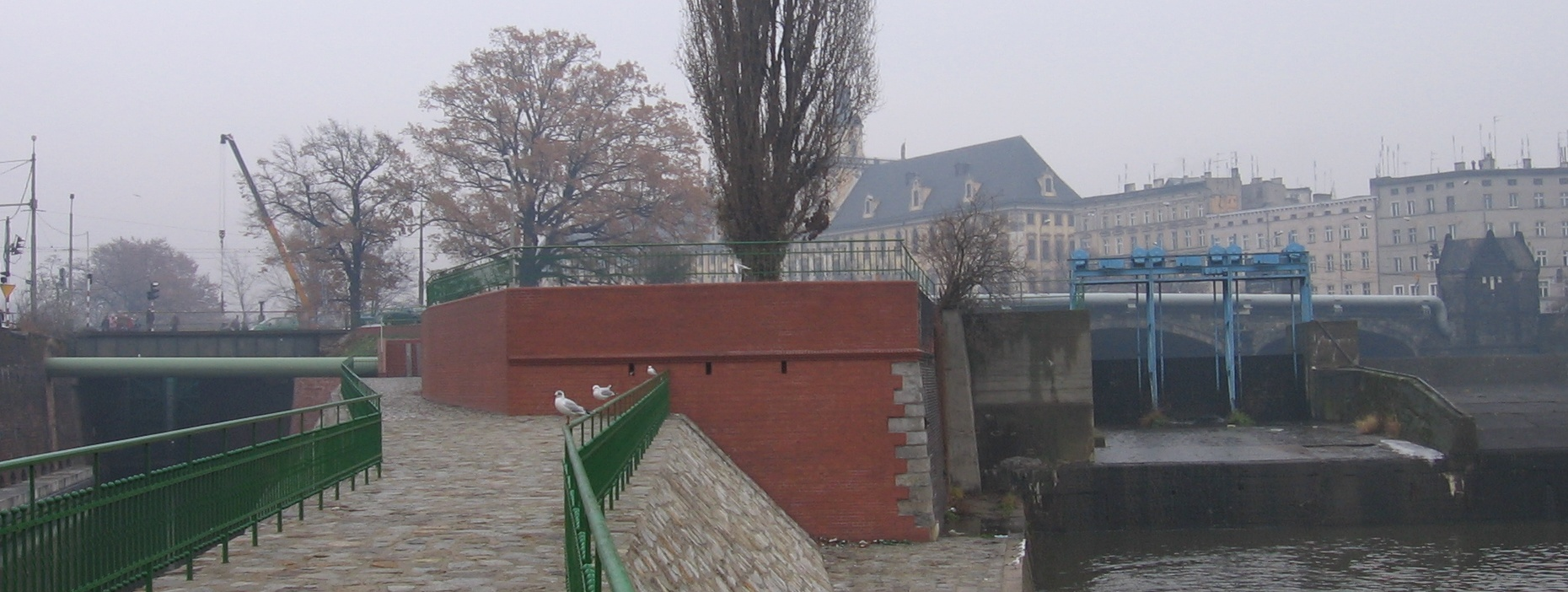
Downstream view of the barrage: Left: City Lock canal Right: Northern span of the South Power Plant weir

The City Barrage is a barrage in Wrocław, Poland, located within the Downtown Water Junction – Lower Section. It regulates the waters of the Oder river, the largest river flowing through the city, specifically on its downtown anabranch that runs through the city center.

== Components ==
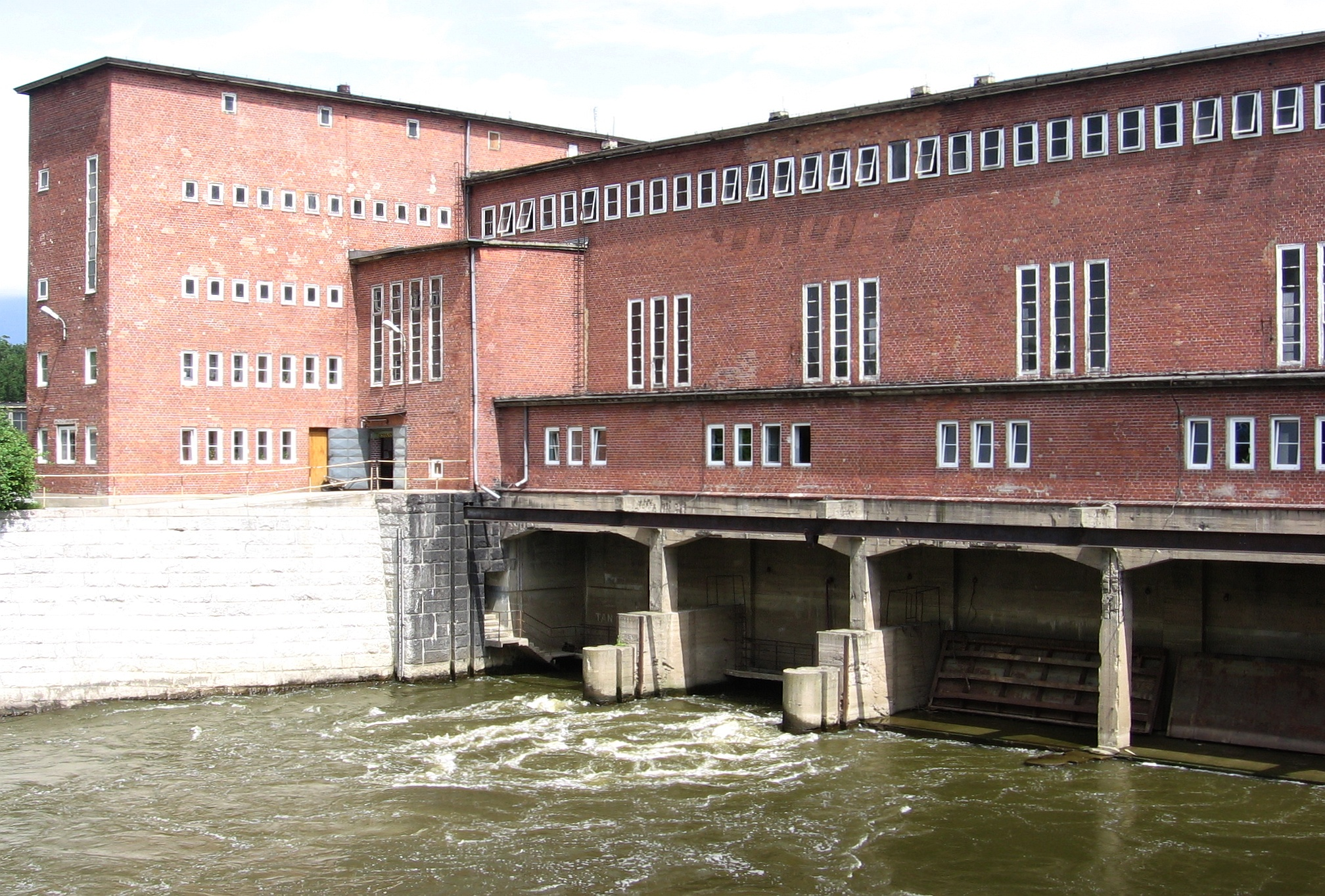
Downstream view of the barrage: Wrocław I (South) Hydroelectric Power Plant

The barrage comprises several key hydrotechnical components, as well as associated buildings and auxiliary structures. The primary components include:

- Wrocław I Hydroelectric Power Plant
- Wrocław I Power Plant Weir
- City Lock
- Wrocław II Hydroelectric Power Plant
- Wrocław II Power Plant Weir

In addition to these core water-regulating structures, subsequent investments have resulted in the construction of numerous essential auxiliary and supporting structures. These include the buildings of both hydroelectric power plants, a bridge at the southern power plant (Access Bridge at the South Hydroelectric Power Plant Complex in Wrocław), wharfs, bank reinforcements above and below the barrage, a canal (City Lock bypass), and others. Within the southern part of the barrage, two small, unnamed islands were formed: one created by the City Lock bypass canal and another partially occupied by the South Power Plant building. Adjacent to the barrage, another investment – the Pomeranian Bridges – was completed, though these bridges are not part of the barrage itself.

== History ==
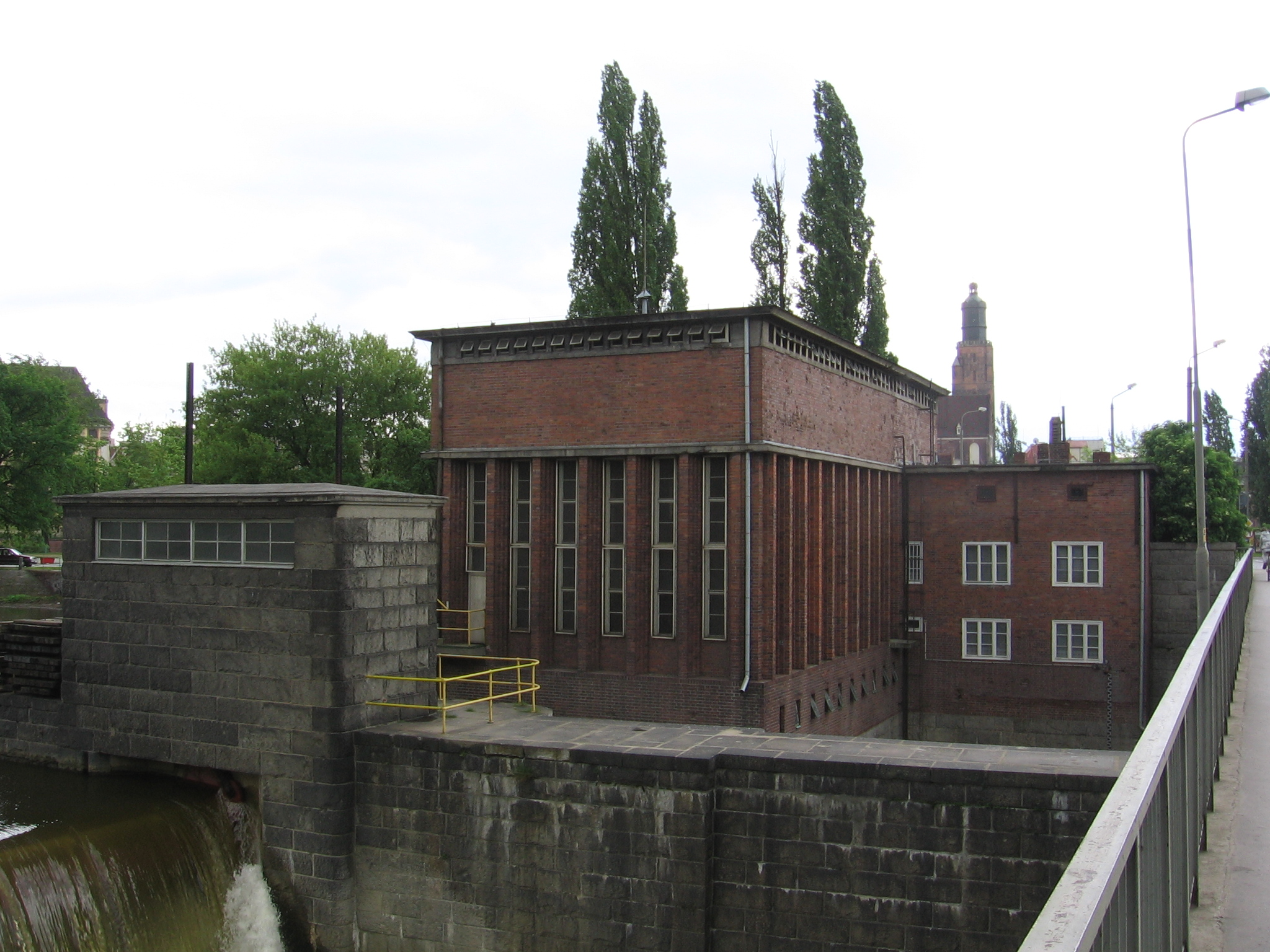
Wrocław II Hydroelectric Power Plant (viewed from the Northern Pomeranian Bridge), with water flowing over the weir flap on the left

The current configuration of the City Barrage is the outcome of multiple investments staggered over time, expanding or modifying its scope and functionality. The need for its construction arose initially from river bed erosion caused by the operation of the earlier Piaskowy Barrage upstream. This erosion threatened the stability of the Piaskowy Barrage's structures, prompting the decision to build a downstream barrage to safeguard those constructions and enable the development of new hydroelectric facilities in Wrocław.

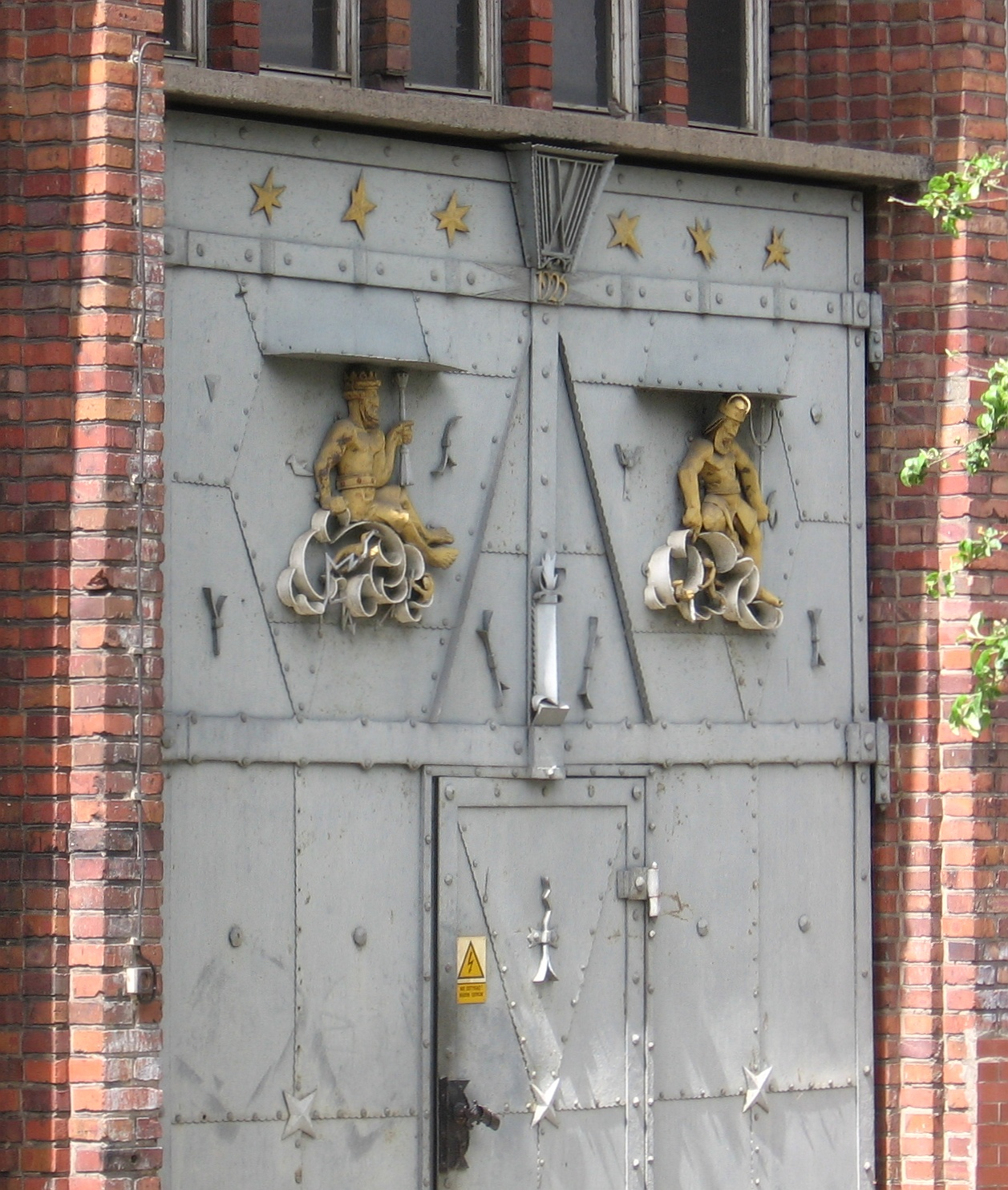
Wrocław II Hydroelectric Power Plant – gate to the power plant building

History of the City Barrage
Years	Structure	Event or type of construction
1334	barrage	Start of weir and mill construction
1792–1794	City Lock	Construction of a wooden lock
1874–1879	City Lock	Construction of a new masonry lock
1916	barrage	Start of barrage reconstruction, mill demolition
1921–1924	South Hydroelectric Power Plant	Construction
1921–1924	South Power Plant Weir	Construction
1924	South Hydroelectric Power Plant	Handover to the city
1924–1925	North Hydroelectric Power Plant	Construction
1926	North Hydroelectric Power Plant	Handover to the city
1941–1942	South Power Plant Weir	Reconstruction
1942	North Power Plant Weir	Construction of a new weir
1959	South Power Plant Weir	Reconstruction
1959	barrage	Increase in water retention level
1970	South Hydroelectric Power Plant	Installation of Kaplan turbines
2003–2005	City Lock	Renovation

== Naming ==
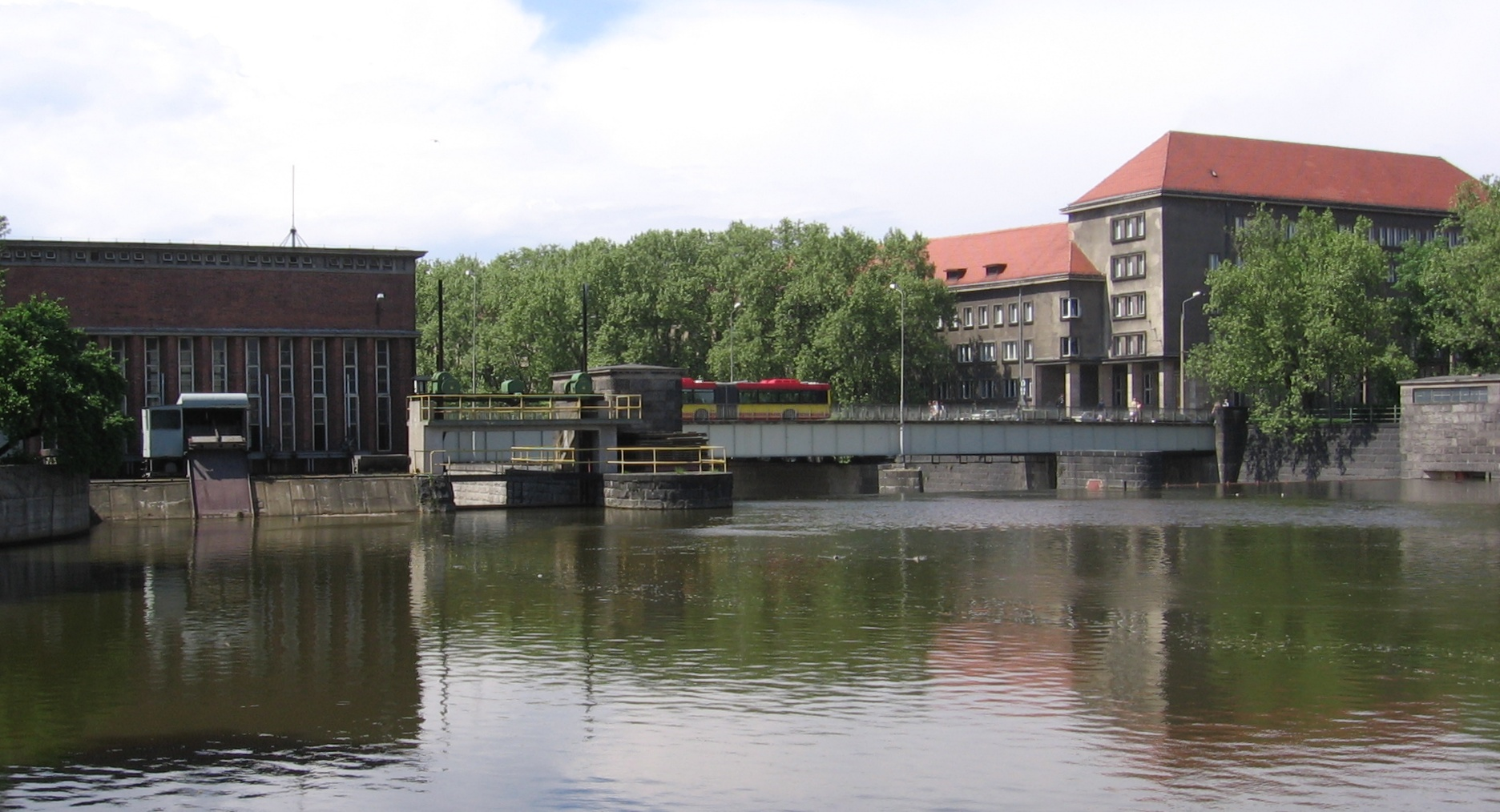
Upstream view of the barrage: Left: Wrocław II Hydroelectric Power Plant Right: Weir (behind it, the Northern Pomeranian Bridge)

In the post-war period in Poland, a standardized naming convention for the barrage's components emerged. The lock is named consistently with the barrage: City Lock. For the two hydroelectric power plants and their weirs, distinguishing nomenclature varies in literature and publications, with authors interchangeably using either Roman numerals (I and II) or positional descriptors: South (I) and North (II). Since the current structures were built when Wrocław was part of Germany, they also had earlier German names.

Current and historical names
Current name	Alternative name	German Name
Wrocław I Hydroelectric Power Plant	South Hydroelectric Power Plant	Kraftwerk
Wrocław I Power Plant Weir	South Power Plant Weir	
City Lock		Bürgerwerder-Schleuse
Wrocław II Hydroelectric Power Plant	North Hydroelectric Power Plant	Kraftwerk
Wrocław II Power Plant Weir	North Power Plant Weir, Great Dam	

== Location ==
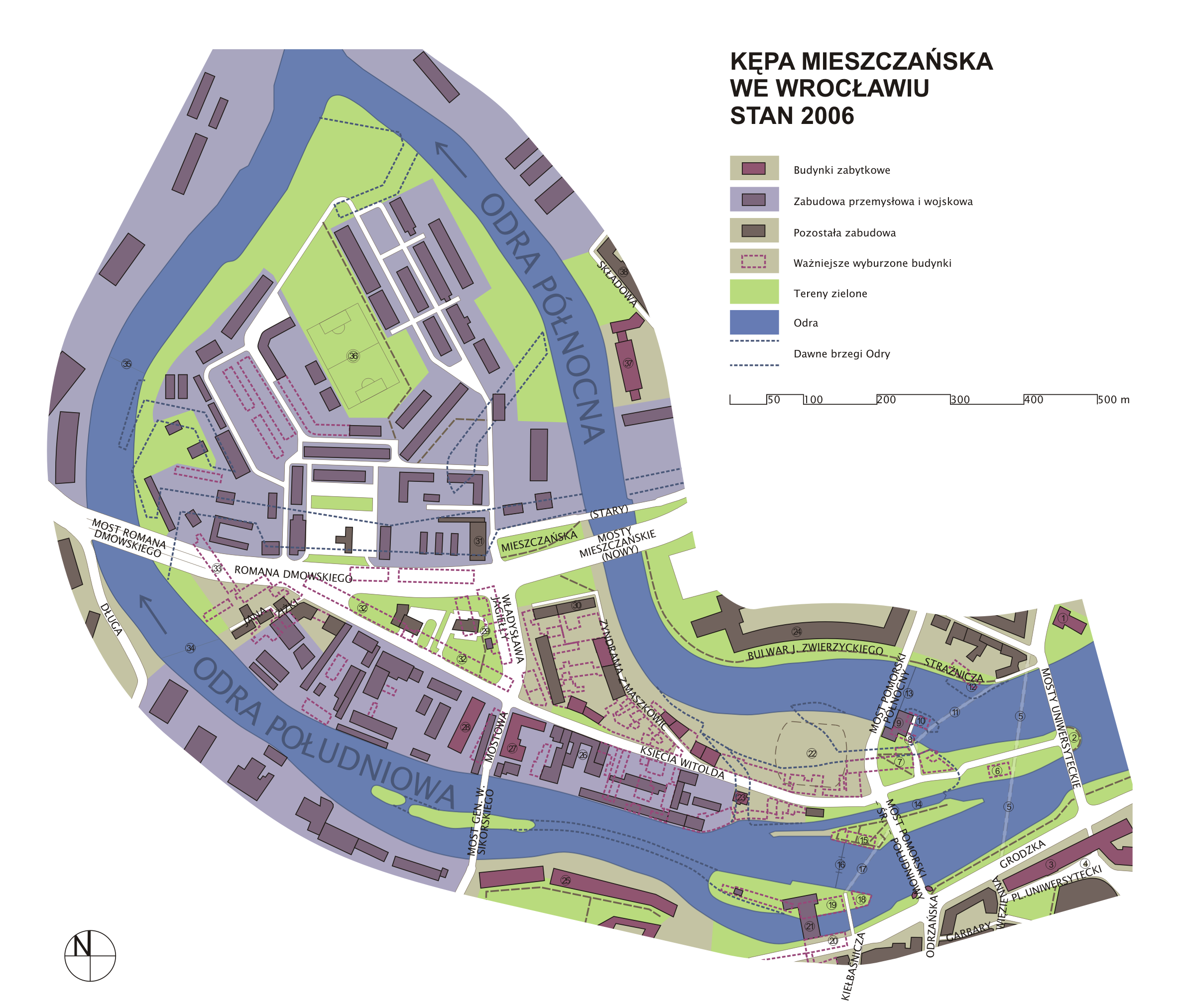
Kępa Mieszczańska and City Barrage: 21. South Power Plant; 16. South Power Plant Weir; 14. City Lock; 9. North Power Plant; 13. North Power Plant Weir

The barrage includes structures situated across two branches of the Oder river flowing through the city center: the so-called South Oder and North Oder. Together with numerous smaller branches and canals, these form the Downtown Water Junction, which is divided into:

- The Upper Downtown Water Junction, encompassing branches and canals where the Piaskowy Barrage is located, featuring small islands. Here, the South and North Oder briefly merge before splitting again shortly downstream.
- The Lower Downtown Water Junction, encompassing both river branches (and short canals) surrounding the Kępa Mieszczańska island, where the City Barrage is situated at the branches' outset.

The section on the South Oder, including the South Power Plant, its weir, and the lock, lies between Kępa Mieszczańska island (north of the lock), part of the Nadodrze district, and the Old Town area (south of the power plant). The power plant and weir are downstream (west) of the Southern Pomeranian Bridge, while the lock is upstream (east) of the Middle Pomeranian Bridge. Upstream of the lock, a wharf was built for passenger navigation. The North Oder section, comprising the North Power Plant and its weir, is positioned between Kępa Mieszczańska and the Nadodrze district, slightly upstream (east) of the Northern Pomeranian Bridge. A riverside boulevard runs along the retaining wall here. In 2009, an urban marina, Marina Topacz, was established on Kępa Mieszczańska upstream of the barrage on this branch.

The South Power Plant weir is located at kilometer 252.45 of the Oder's current, while the North Power Plant weir is at kilometer 1.2 of the North Oder's current.

== Role in the functional system ==
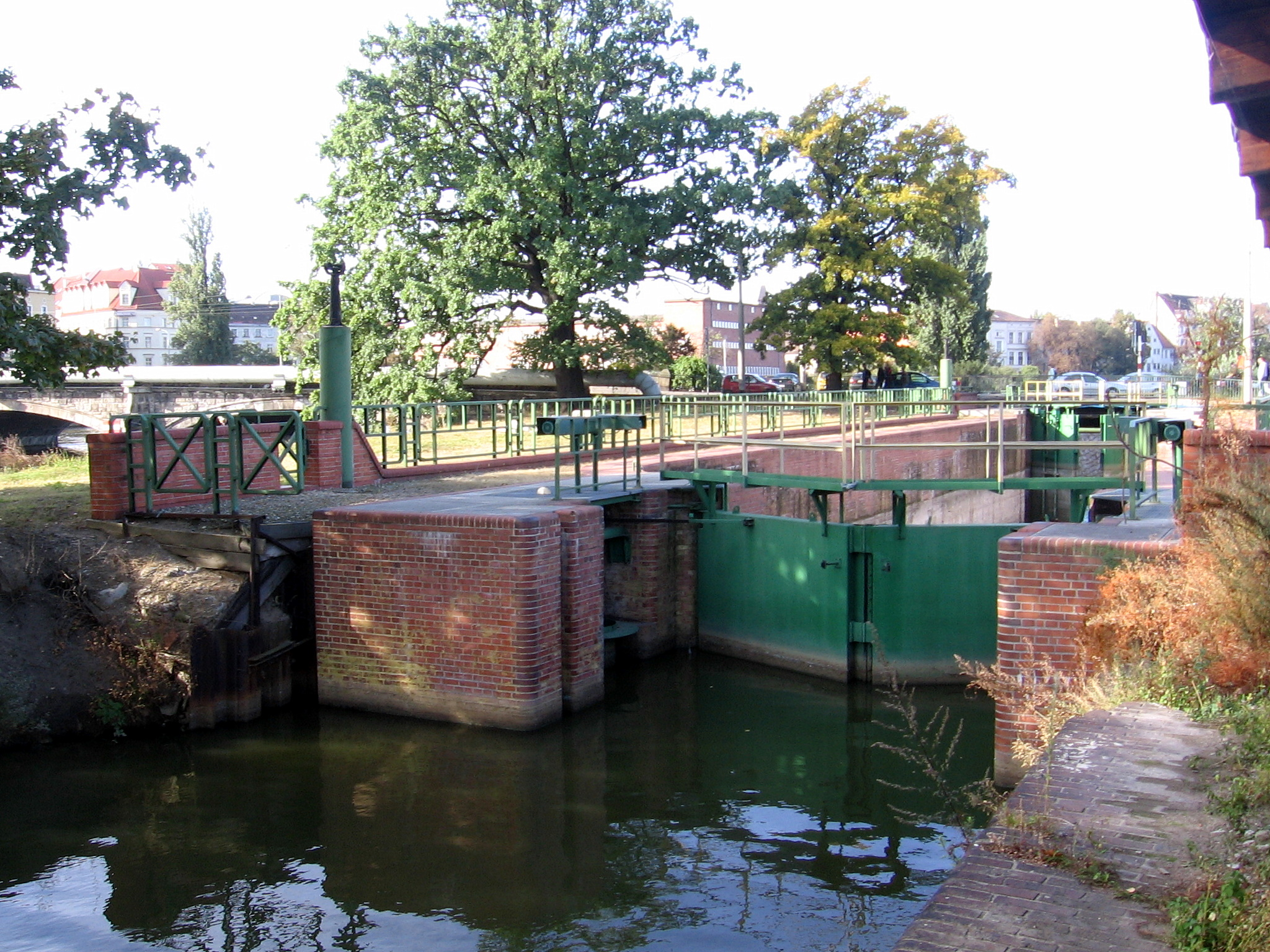
Upstream view of the barrage: City Lock

Wrocław is situated along a canalized section of the Oder river, making the City Barrage one of a series of structures maintaining the required river barrages. The preceding barrage is the Piaskowy Barrage, while the next downstream is the Rędzin Barrage. Within the broader Wrocław Water Junction, parallel (functionally equivalent) structures include the Różanka Barrage on the Main Waterway and, partially, the Psie Pole Barrage – specifically its City Lock – on the Wrocław Urban Waterway.

Although the City Barrage includes a chamber lock, the waterway it serves is not classified as an official inland waterway under Polish law, as per the Council of Ministers' regulation on inland waterways; it is not listed in the regulation's annex of inland waterways. Nonetheless, the downtown navigation routes have been opened to shipping by the Wrocław Regional Water Management Authority.

== Main structures ==
The main structures of the barrage maintain the designated water retention level and serve specific functions. Until 1959, the drop was 3.74 m (12.3 ft). Following reconstruction and operational adjustments, the current drop is 5.62 m (18.4 ft).

Main structures of the City Barrage
Name	Anabranch or canal	Type	Date of construction	Key specifications
Wrocław I Hydroelectric Power Plant	South Oder – power plant canal	Hydroelectric power plant	1924	Installed capacity: 2.4 MW
Wrocław I Power Plant Weir	South Oder	Weir	1924 (rebuilt 1959)	Spans: 6.5 m (21.3 ft) (3 sluices); 22.4 m (73.5 ft) (fixed); 11.0 m (36.1 ft) (4 sluices)
City Lock	South Oder – bypass canal	Chamber lock	1794 (rebuilt 1879, 2000)	Dimensions: 42.8 × 5.3 m (140.4 × 17.4 ft); Gates: Mitre gates
Wrocław II Hydroelectric Power Plant	North Oder	Hydroelectric power plant	1925	Installed capacity: 1 MW
Wrocław II Power Plant Weir	North Oder	Weir	1942	Spans: 25.7 m (84.3 ft) (flap); 25.7 m (84.3 ft) (flap); 6.5 m (21.3 ft) (sluice)

== Additional structures ==
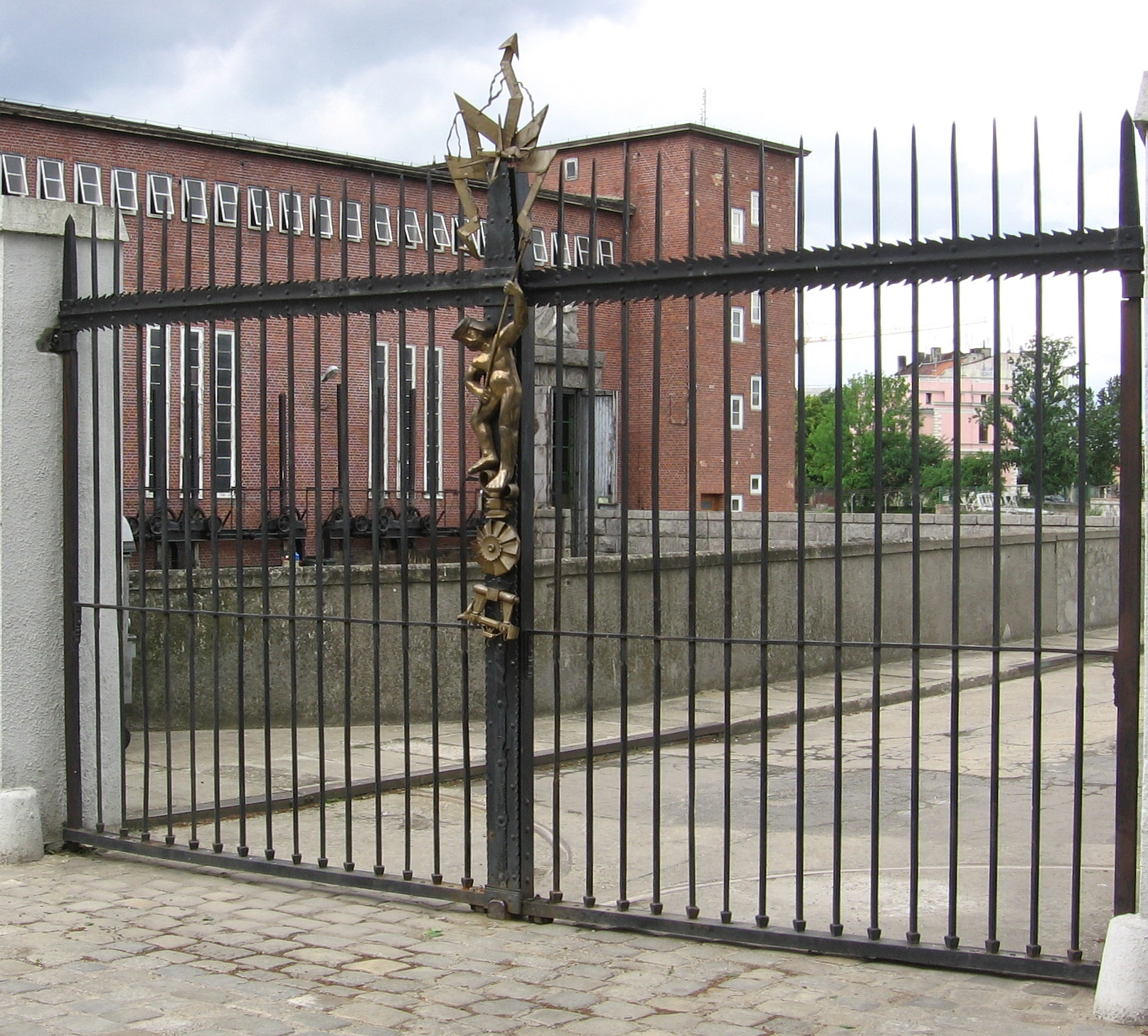
Entrance gate to the South Power Plant grounds, with the bridge behind

The South Power Plant's machine building was designed by Max Berg, in collaboration with Ludwig Moshamer and Richard Konwiarz. It features decorative elements and metalwork crafted by Jaroslav Vonka and Robert Bednorz.

The North Power Plant building was also designed by Max Berg, with decorative metal elements by Jaroslav Vonka.
