= Lake Eyre basin =

Drainage basin in Australia

Coordinates: 25°59′49″S 137°59′57″E

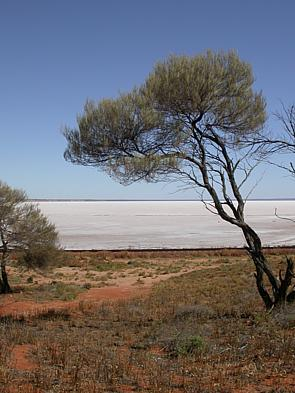
- Lake Hart is one of the smaller lakes in the basin
- Etymology: Lake Eyre; Edward John Eyre
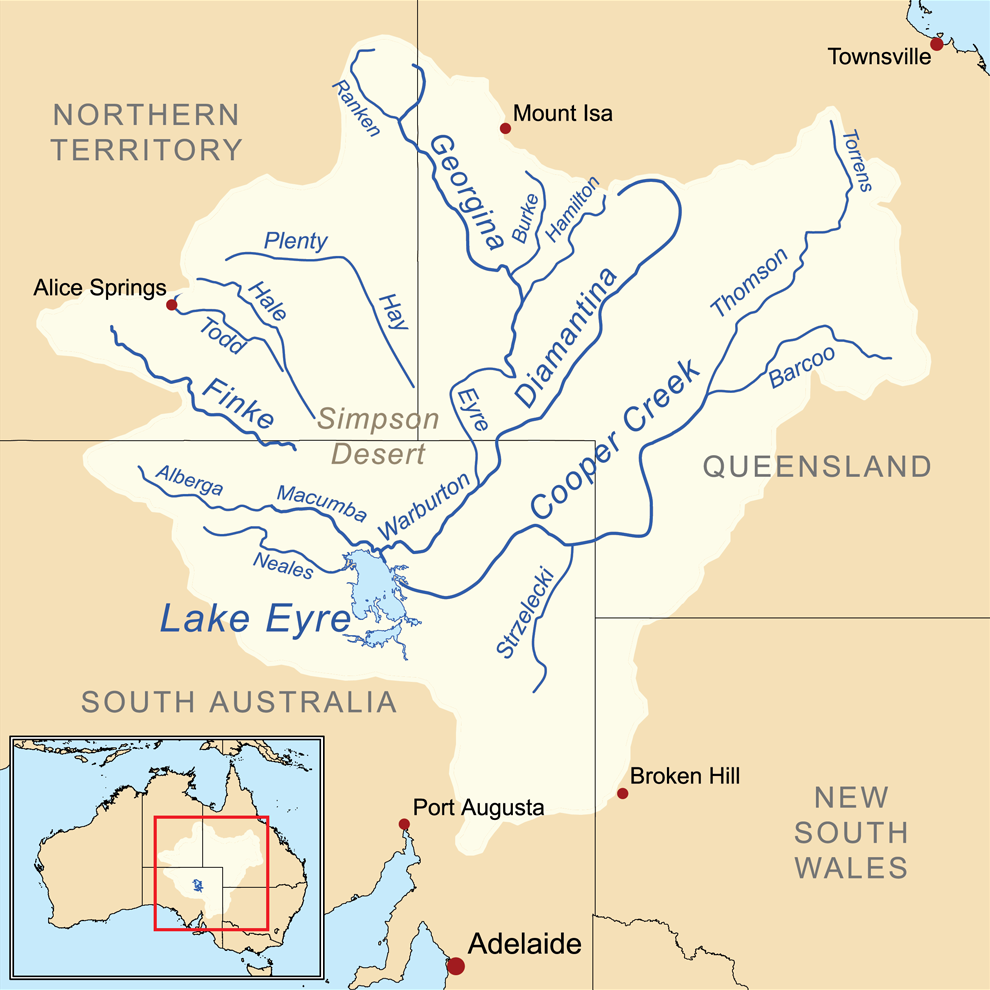
- Map of the Lake Eyre Basin showing the major rivers
- Country: Australia
- States and territories: Queensland; South Australia; Northern Territory; New South Wales

Area
  - Total: 1,200,000 km^{2} (460,000 sq mi)

The Lake Eyre basin (/ɛər/ AIR) is a drainage basin that covers just under one-sixth of all Australia. It is the largest endorheic basin in Australia and amongst the largest in the world, covering about 1,200,000 square kilometres (463,323 sq mi), including much of inland Queensland, large portions of South Australia and the Northern Territory, and a part of western New South Wales. The basin is also one of the largest, least-developed arid-zone basins with a high degree of variability anywhere. It supports only about 60,000 people and has no major irrigation, diversions, or flood-plain developments. Low-density grazing that sustains a large amount of wildlife is the major land use, occupying 82% of the total land within the basin. The Lake Eyre basin of precipitation (rain water) to a great extent geographically overlaps the Great Artesian Basin underneath.

The basin began as a sinking landmass mostly covered by forest and contained many more lakes than now. The climate has changed from wet to arid over the last 60 million years. Most of the rivers in the Lake Eyre basin are now slow flowing, flat, and completely dry for lengthy periods. When the country north of the basin floods, floodwaters drain via the main rivers of the basin—Cooper Creek, Georgina River, and Diamantina River—southwards towards Kati Thanda–Lake Eyre, the country's lowest point at 16 metres (52 ft) below sea level. The water overflows the river banks, across the floodplains, filling waterholes and wetlands and carving new channels, giving rise to the name Channel Country. Most of the rain which falls in the north never reaches the lake 1,000 km away, which only fills occasionally.

Management of the area has been problematic as it is covered by four different states' jurisdictions. As the ecological significance of the basin has become known and mismanagement of another Australian basin, the Murray-Darling Basin, became apparent during several drought cycles, it became clear that ongoing management issues had to be resolved. In 2001 the Lake Eyre Basin Intergovernmental Agreement was signed, which was set up to ensure the sustainability of the Lake Eyre Basin river systems.

== Geology ==
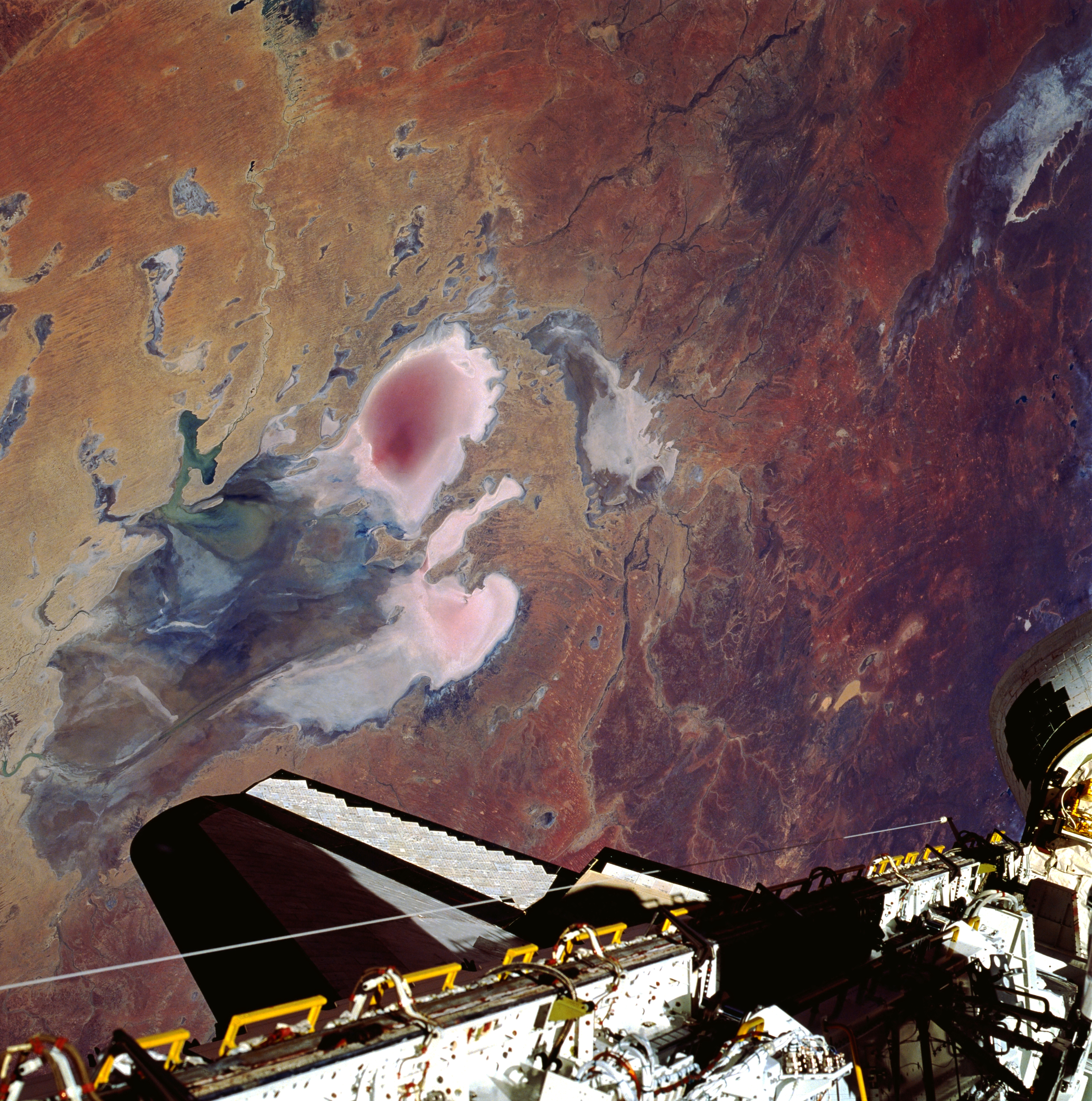
Lake Eyre in 1990, as seen by STS-35

The basin began to form in the early Paleogene (about 60 million years ago) when south-eastern South Australia started to sink and rivers began to deposit sediment into the large, shallow basin. A remnant of an old oceanic plate is currently sinking in the mantle beneath the basin. The suction effect of this sinking likely caused both the Lake Eyre Basin as well as the Murray-Darling basin to form. The basin is still gradually sinking, and still gradually accumulating sediment. For many millions of years, the Lake Eyre Basin was well-supplied with water and largely forested. About 20 million years ago, large, shallow lakes formed, covering much of the area for about 10 million years. From that time on, as Australia drifted further north and the climate became gradually more arid, the lakes and floodplains started to dry. Only in the last 2.6 million years did the onset of the ice ages bring about the present climatic regime and the consequent fairly rapid desertification of the area.

The basin covers just under one-sixth of all Australia and is the largest endorheic basin in Australia and amongst the largest in the world, covering about 1,200,000 square kilometres (463,323 sq mi), including much of inland Queensland, large portions of South Australia and the Northern Territory, and a part of western New South Wales.

== Geography ==
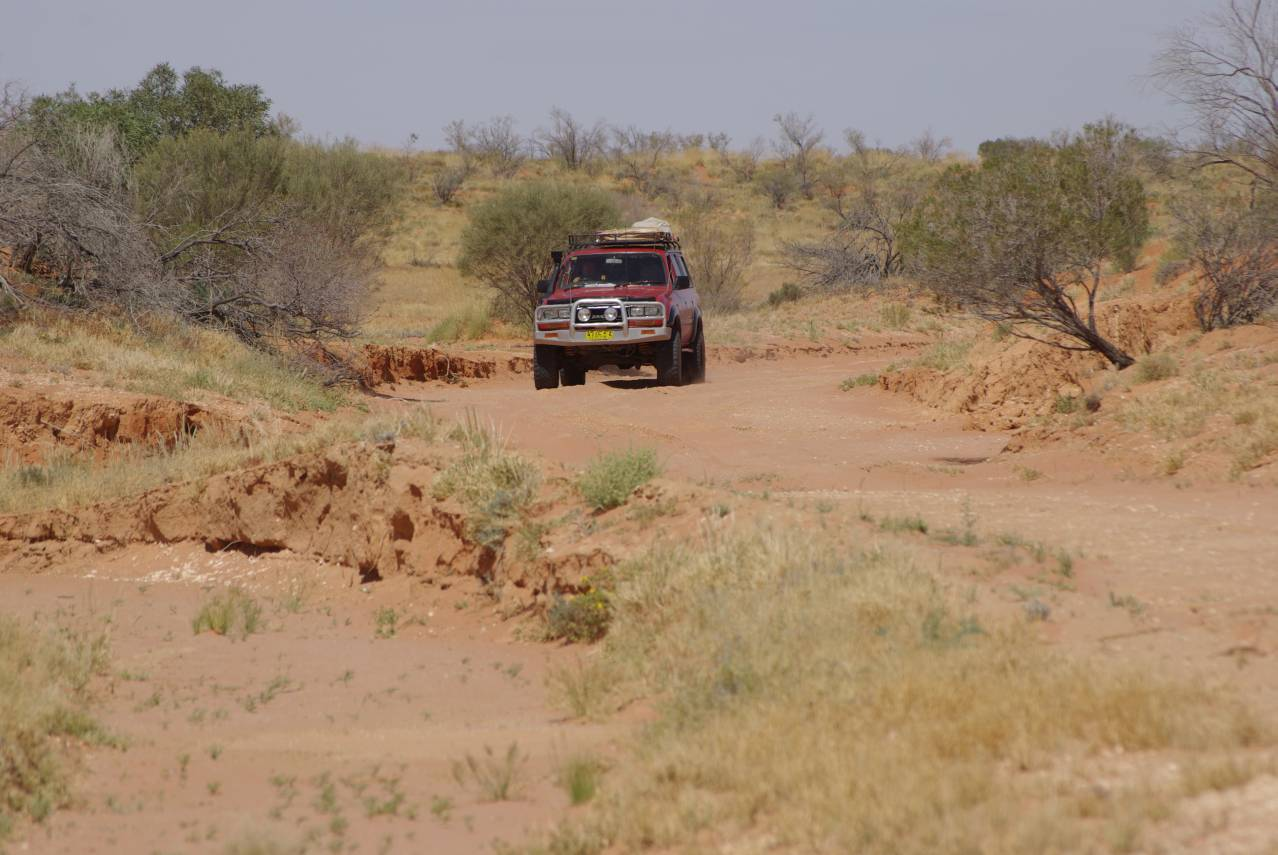
Strzelecki Desert, South Australia

During years of especially high rainfall, all the riverbeds in this vast, mostly flat, arid and semi-arid area lead inland (not towards the sea) towards Lake Eyre in central South Australia.

Lake Eyre itself lies approximately 16 metres (52 ft) below sea level, and usually contains only salt. In flood years, it fills and, for a short time, undergoes a period of rapid growth and fertility: long-dormant marine creatures multiply and large flocks of waterfowl arrive to feed and raise their young before the waters evaporate once more. The annual mean runoff in the Lake Eyre Basin is the lowest of any of the world's major drainage basins.

None of the creeks and rivers in the Lake Eyre Basin are permanent: they flow only after heavy rain, a rare to very rare event in the arid interior of Australia. Average annual rainfall in the area surrounding Lake Eyre is 125 millimetres (4.9 in), and the pan evaporation rate is 3.5 metres (11 ft). Annualised average figures are misleading: since 1885, annual rainfall over the 1,100,000 square kilometres (420,000 sq mi) of the Lake Eyre Basin has ranged from about 45 millimetres (1.8 in) in 1928 to over 760 millimetres (30 in) in 1974. Most of the water reaching Lake Eyre comes from the river systems of semi-arid inland Queensland, roughly 1,000 kilometres (620 mi) to the north.

To provide a sense of scale, the Lake Eyre Basin is about the size of France, Germany, and Italy combined. It is slightly larger than the Murray-Darling basin (which drains inland eastern Australia and is responsible for a large proportion of the continent's agricultural productivity) but has vastly less water. Nevertheless, the entire flow of the Murray-Darling would be insufficient to fill Lake Eyre, merely keeping pace with evaporation. (In contrast, the flow of the Mississippi could fill Lake Eyre in 22 days, that of the Amazon in just three days.)

Other lakes in the basin include Lake Frome, Lake Yamma Yamma, and Lake Hart.

The basin is also one of the largest, least-developed arid-zone basins with a high degree of variability anywhere. It supports about 60,000 people and a large amount of wildlife, and has no major irrigation, diversions, or flood-plain developments.

=== Rivers ===
The Cooper Creek, Finke River, Georgina River, and Diamantina River are the four main rivers of the basin. Other desert rivers include the Hale River, Plenty River, and Todd River that flow from the southeast of the Northern Territory, south. In the western parts of the basin, the Neales River and Macumba River flow into Lake Eyre.

Rivers within the basin have a low gradient, slow flow rate, and a naturally turbid water quality. Several of the major Lake Eyre Basin river systems are well-known. Because the Lake Eyre Basin is almost flat, rivers flow slowly and frequently split up into floodplains or braided channels. Water is lost to evaporation, to seepage, and in the many ephemeral wetland systems, with the result that downstream flows are typically smaller than upstream flows. Only in exceptional years is there sufficient upstream rain to provide a flow into Lake Eyre itself.

The Finke River, starting roughly west of Alice Springs, is thought to be the oldest riverbed in the world, and although it flows for only a few days a year (in many years it does not flow at all), is home to seven species of fish, two of which are found nowhere else. The waters of the Finke disappear into the sands of the Simpson Desert and are not definitely known to ever make it as far south as Lake Eyre, although the story is told that this happened once early in the 20th century. In extreme events, water from the Finke River flows into the Macumba River, which empties into Lake Eyre, a total distance from headwater streams of around 750 km (470 mi). Major tributaries include Ellery Creek and the Palmer and Hugh Rivers.

The Georgina River system originates on the Barkly Tableland, near the Northern Territory–Queensland border, northwest of Mount Isa and not far south of the Gulf of Carpentaria. In this relatively humid northern area, rainfall can be as high as 500 millimetres (20 in) per year and evaporation as low as 2.4 metres (7 ft 10 in). The Georgina flows through innumerable channels leading south through far-western Queensland for over 1,000 kilometres (620 mi), eventually reaching Goyder Lagoon in the northeastern corner of South Australia.

Australia's early bush poets immortalised the Diamantina River, making it a symbol of the remote outback. It too rises in northern Queensland, roughly between Mount Isa and Winton, flowing 800 kilometres south and west through Birdsville and the Channel Country to join the Georgina at Goyder Lagoon (and then, if there is sufficient flow, down Warburton Creek towards Lake Eyre).

Of all the Lake Eyre Basin river systems, however, Cooper Creek is by far the most famous, in particular because it was along Cooper Creek that the explorers Burke and Wills met their deaths. It rises in the form of two central Queensland rivers, the Thomson between Longreach and Charters Towers, and the Barcoo in the area around Barcaldine, about 500 kilometres (310 mi) inland from Rockhampton. Cooper Creek spreads out into a vast area of meandering ephemeral channels, making its way roughly south into the far southwest corner of Queensland before turning due west into South Australia towards Lake Eyre. It takes almost a year for water to reach Lake Eyre from the headwaters. In most years, none does: it is absorbed into the earth, goes to fill channels and the many permanent waterholes, or simply evaporates. Water from Cooper Creek reached Lake Eyre in 1990 and then not again until 2010.

=== Deserts ===
The deserts that have formed in the basin, including Sturt Stony Desert, Tirari Desert, and the Strzelecki Desert, are most probably the southern hemisphere's largest source of airborne dust.

== Fauna ==
A total of 27 individual species of fish are found in Lake Eyre basin, with 13 of them being endemic. The largest fish species is the Macquaria, reaching a maximum weight of about 3 kilograms (6.6 lb).

== Traditional owners ==
Wangkangurru (also known as Arabana/Wangkangurru, Wangganguru, Wanggangurru, Wongkangurru) is an Australian Aboriginal language spoken on Wangkangurru country. It is closely related to Arabana language of South Australia. The Wangkangurru language region was traditionally in the South Australia–Queensland border region taking in Birdsville and extending south towards Innamincka and Lake Eyre, including the local government areas of the Shire of Diamantina as well as the Outback Communities Authority of South Australia.

== Management ==
Indigenous Australians have lived with the cycles of the land for thousands of years and traditional owners are protective of its natural systems.

Management of the area has been problematic as it is covered by four different states' jurisdictions. As the ecological significance of the basin has become known and mismanagement of the Murray-Darling Basin became apparent during several drought cycles, it became clear that ongoing management issues had to be resolved. In 2001, the Lake Eyre Basin Intergovernmental Agreement was signed, and the Lake Eyre Basin Intergovernmental Agreement was set up to ensure the sustainability of the Lake Eyre Basin river systems, particularly to avoid or eliminate cross-border impacts. The Lake Eyre Basin Ministerial Forum was established as the decision-making body responsible for overseeing of the Agreement. The Ministerial Forum created a Community Advisory Committee to provide advice and facilitate community participation and a Scientific Advisory Panel to advise on scientific and technical issues. On 7 September 2018, the Lake Eyre Basin Ministerial Forum agreed to release the second review of the agreement.

=== Land use and mining ===
Low-density grazing is the major land use, occupying 82% of the total land within the basin. Significant minerals deposits such as oil and natural gas, including Australia's most significant onshore petroleum reserves, are found within the basin. The mining and petroleum industries account for the greatest economic activity in the Lake Eyre Basin. Opals, coal, phosphate, gypsum, and uranium are also mined from the basin.

In 2009, the Queensland Environmental Protection Agency confirmed that heavy metals from mining operations near Mount Isa had entered the upper reaches of the Georgina River. The spill has the potential to contaminate parts of the basin as far south as Lake Eyre.

In 2014, the Queensland Government changed the laws protecting the rivers and floodplains, which, according to environmentalists, could lead to shale gas mining or fracking in the area.

As of 2022 there are fears that mining for coal seam gas could be very detrimental to the fragile environment of the floodplains.

=== Protected areas ===
The Kati Thanda–Lake Eyre National Park, Strzelecki Regional Reserve, Witjira National Park, Sturt National Park, Diamantina National Park, and Simpson Desert National Park are among a number of protected areas established within the Lake Eyre Basin.

=== River diversion schemes ===
The Bradfield Scheme was an ambitious proposal by Dr John Bradfield in 1938. It would use large pipes, tunnels, pumps, and dams to divert water from the monsoon-fed Tully, Herbert, and Burdekin rivers into the Thomson River, Queensland. After a critical review in 1947, support for the scheme fell through. However, in the 2010s, interest in various updated or amended Bradfield schemes have increased among various politicians.

Other less-developed diversion schemes have been proposed to divert river or sea water into the Lake Eyre Basin from time to time.
