= Arabana language =

Australian Aboriginal language

Arabana
- Arabana-Wangkangurru
- Region: South Australia; west side Lake Eyre to Stuart Range, Maree, Port Augusta
- Ethnicity: Arabana people, Wongkanguru
- Native speakers: 31 (2021 census)
- Language family: Pama–Nyungan: Karnic; Arabana
- Dialects: Piltapalta; Wangkakupa; Midlaliri; Wangkangurru

Language codes
- ISO 639-3: ard
- Glottolog: arab1267
- AIATSIS: L13 Arabana (cover term)
- ELP: Arabana-Wangkangurru
- Arabana is classified as Critically Endangered by the UNESCO Atlas of the World's Languages in Danger.

Arabana or Arabuna /ˈʌrəbʌnə/ is an Australian Aboriginal language of the Pama–Nyungan family, spoken by the Wongkanguru and Arabana people.

The language is in steep decline, with an estimated 250 speakers according to 2004 NILS, to just 21 speakers found in the 2006 census.

== Name ==
In Arabana, initial /ŋ/ underwent elision and this process continued into the 20th century (e.g. in 19th century wordlists, "yes" is given as ngarayi, but in 1994 the word was invariably pronounced arayi). Thus, the language's name used to be Ngarabana, rather than the current form Arabana.

== Geographic distribution ==
Arabana is spoken at Neales River on the west side of Lake Eyre west to the Stuart Range; Macumba Creek south to Coward Springs; at Oodnadatta, Lora Creek, Lake Cadibarrawirracanna, and The Peake. Their boundary with the Kokatha people to their west is marked by the margin of the scarp of the western tableland near Coober Pedy.

== Dialects ==
Each dialect had different varieties depending on the speaker's local group.

=== Piltapalta ===
Piltapalta, called "Arabana Proper" by linguist Luise Hercus, was spoken in the northern part of Arabana territory, south of the Macumba River and at Mount Dutton and Peake. Piltapalta translates to "taking something away from someone" and probably refers to an Arabana myth associated with Mount Dutton. Its last fluent speaker was Arthur McLean (b. c. 1898 – d. 1975).

=== Wangkakupa ===
Wangkakupa was spoken at Anna Creek Station. This was a major centre for Arabana people, and thus Wangkakupa is the best preserved dialect. The name translates to 'little language'.

=== Midlaliri ===
Midlaliri was spoken on the Stuart Range and its adjacent tablelands. The last speaker was Sam Warrpa from Coober Pedy, who died in the 1940s. Midlaliri is unrecorded, except for a few verses of song. The name is unanalysable.

=== Wangkangurru ===
Wangkangurru had 3 main varieties: Mikiri-nganha 'from the native wells', or Mungathirri-nganha 'from the high sandhills', spoken in the Simpson Desert; Marlu-papu-nganha 'from the Marlu-papu country' or Karla-nganha 'from the Creek', spoken on the Kallakoopah Creek and lower Diamantina River; and Eastern Wangkangurru, spoken by the descendants of Simpson Desert people who settled in the Birdsville area.

Speakers perceive Wangkangurru as a separate language. It is mostly mutually intelligible with Arabana.

== Phonology ==
Most of the nasals and laterals are allophonically prestopped.

	Peripheral		Laminal		Apical	
	Bilabial	Velar	Palatal	Dental	Alveolar	Retroflex
Stop	p	k	c	t̪	t	ɖ
Nasal	m ~ ᵇm	ŋ	ɲ ~ ᶡɲ	n̪ ~ ᵈ̪n̪	n ~ ᵈn	ɳ
Lateral			ʎ ~ ᶡʎ	l̪ ~ ᵈ̪l̪	l ~ ᵈl	ɭ
Vibrant					ɾ ~ r	
Approximant	w		j		ɻ	

Arabana has three phonemic vowel sounds as is typical in other Australian languages.

	Front	Back
High	i	u
Low	a	

== Example sentences ==
Below are examples of Arabana text with interlinear gloss:

Anthirda pingka-nga kari yuka-rnda.
me.LOC front-LOC they go-PRES
'They are walking along with me leading them.'

Anthirda mankarra-nga motorcar padni.
me.LOC girl-LOC motorcar nothing
'When I was a little girl there were no cars around.'

== Bibliography ==
1. Hercus, Luise. 1994. A grammar of the Arabana-Wangkangurru language Lake Eyre Basin, South Australia: Pacific Linguistics C128. Canberra: Pacific Linguistics.
