= Wangkangurru dialect =

Australian Aboriginal language of South Australia

Wangkangurru
- Wangganguru
- Native to: Australia
- Region: South Australia
- Ethnicity: Wangkangurru
- Native speakers: 3, all female (2016 census)
- Language family: Pama–Nyungan: Karnic; Arabana; Wangkangurru

Language codes
- ISO 639-3: wgg
- Glottolog: wang1290
- AIATSIS: L27
- ELP: Wangganguru

Wangkangurru or Wangganguru /ˈwʌŋɡəŋˈʊəruː/ is an Australian Aboriginal language of the Pama–Nyungan family. It was a dialect of Arabana spoken by the Wangkangurru people.

== Phonology ==
Wangganguru had the full range of consonants of the prototypical Australian language. Several of the nasals and laterals were allophonically prestopped.

	Peripheral		Laminal		Apical	
	Bilabial	Velar	Palatal	Dental	Alveolar	Retroflex
Stop	p	k	c	t̪	t	ʈ
Nasal	m ~ bm	ŋ	ɲ	n̪ ~ d̪n̪	n ~ dn	ɳ
Lateral			ʎ	l̪ ~ d̪l̪	l ~ dl	ɭ
Vibrant					r ɾ	
Approximant	w		j		ɻ	
