= Macumba River =

River in South Australia

Coordinates: 27°49′58″S 137°14′13″E

Macumba Treuer
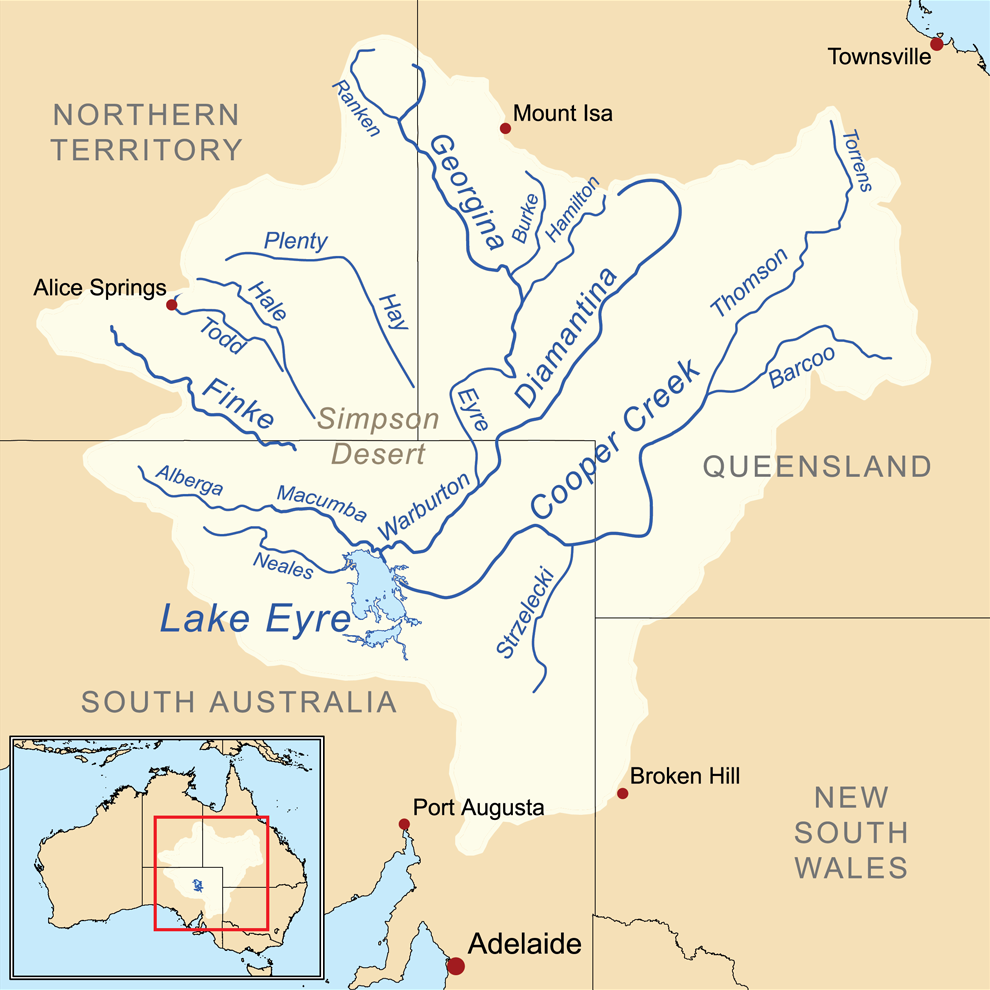

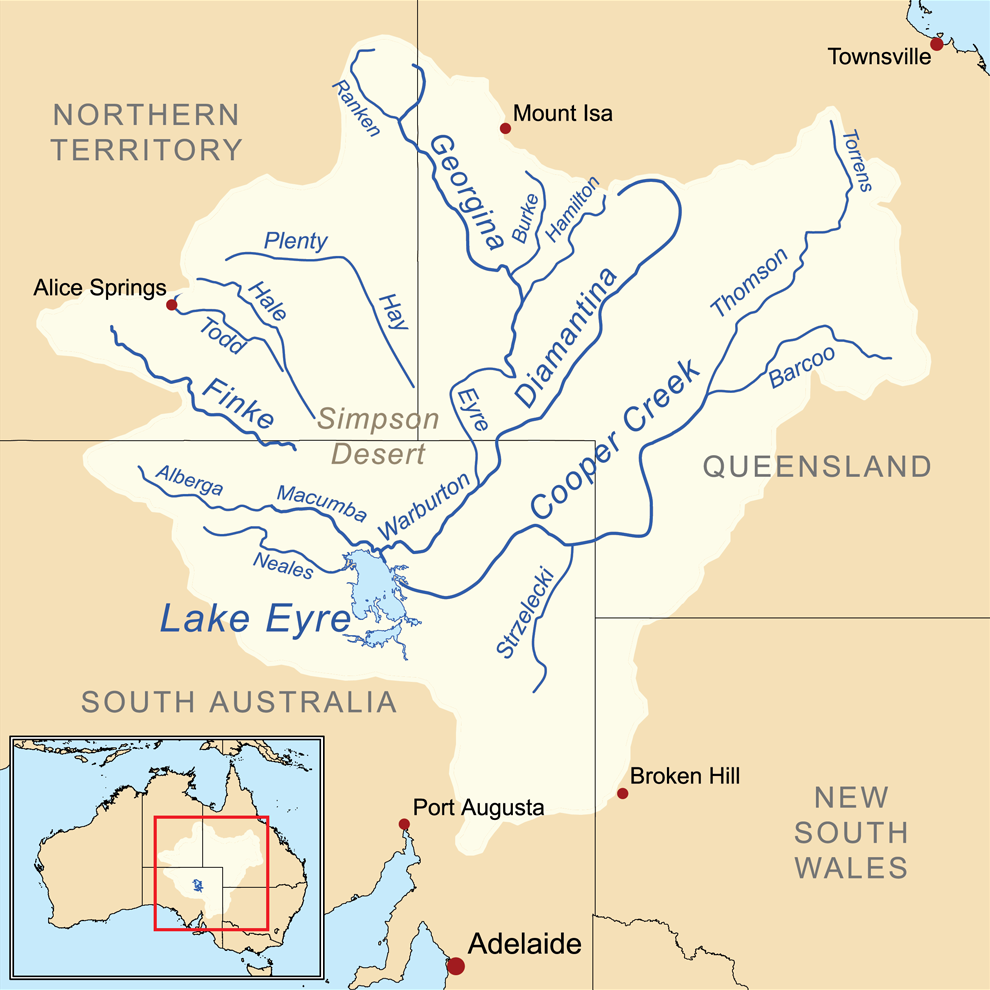
- Map of the Lake Eyre Basin showing the Macumba River
- Native name: Maka-Wimpa (Arabana); Ura-Ingka (Arrernte)

Location
- Country: Australia
- State: South Australia

Physical characteristics
- Source: Macumba Hill
  - elevation: 113 m (371 ft)
- Mouth: Warburton River
  - elevation: −12 m (−39 ft)
- Length: 233 km (145 mi)
- Basin size: 39,000 km^{2} (15,000 sq mi)

Basin features
- River system: Lake Eyre Basin
- Tributaries
  - left: Alberga River

Macumba River (Arabana: Maka-Wimpa; Arrernte: Ura-Ingka), once known as Treuer River, is an ephemeral freshwater stream in the far north of South Australia, that is part of the Lake Eyre Basin.

== Course and features ==
The river rises at the base of Macumba Hill and where the Alberga River joins with Hamilton and Currallulla creeks, it then flows in a south easterly direction entering the Kalamurina Sanctuary and eventually discharges into the Warburton River near the north eastern side of Lake Eyre. The Macumba is situated in an arid region, the Simpson Desert and flows only very rarely. Even in years that Lake Eyre fills, such as 2010, most of the water comes from the east, the Channel Country of Queensland.

The Finke River normally drains into the Simpson Desert to the north west of the Macumba, but in the first decade of the 20th century it is thought that the Finke flowed directly into the Macumba. It is thought that the Finke has flowed to Lake Eyre via the Macumba in 1909, 1938, and 1945.

The Macumba is part of the western rivers catchment of the Lake Eyre Drainange basin along with the Peake Creek and Neales River. The western rivers catchment is composed of sandplains, Acacia scrub, gibber plains and dissected residuals.

Along with its tributaries the river has a catchment area of 39,000 square kilometres (15,058 sq mi). The river passes through a number of permanent and semi-permanent waterholes including Ross waterhole, Walkinna waterhole, Tidnabucca waterhole, Ullabarracoola waterhole and Christmas waterhole. Eleven tributaries join the Macumba including the Alberga River, Stevenson Creek, Coomparana Creek, and Yardaparinna Creek.

== History ==
The traditional owners of the area are the Arabana and Arrernte peoples, both of whom belong to the Central Australian Desert language group. The Macumba features in the Emu story, which is told in 80 verses. The Arabana word for the Macumba is Maka-Wimpa which means fire track, the Arrernte word is Ura-Ingka which also means fire track, named so as the river bed would be the path followed by bushfires in the area.

Wangkangurru (also known as Arabana/Wangkangurru, Wangganguru, Wanggangurru, Wongkangurru) is an Australian Aboriginal language spoken on Wangkangurru country. It is closely related to Arabana language of South Australia. The Wangkangurru language region was traditionally in the South Australian-Queensland border region taking in Birdsville and extending south towards Innamincka and Lake Eyre, including the local government areas of the Shire of Diamantina as well as the Outback Communities Authority of South Australia.

John McDouall Stuart was the first European to explore the area in 1859 when he conducted an expedition to the west of Lake Eyre. In 1870, the Australian Overland Telegraph, which crosses the river near Oodnadatta, was being built.

In 1984, the Macumba, along with Neales River and the other western tributaries, filled Lake Eyre south and partially filled Lake Eyre north from their discharge following heavy rains in central Australia. The river flooded in both 2011 and 2012 with waters discharging into Lake Eyre each time.

== See also ==
- List of rivers of Australia § South Australia
