= Große Isar (Landshut) =

River in Germany

Location
- Country: Germany
- State: Bavaria

Physical characteristics
- Mouth
  - location: Isar
  - coordinates: 48.5580°N 12.1814°E

Große Isar is a river of Bavaria, Germany. It is a branch of the Isar in the city of Landshut. Since the 19th century, human activity, such as hydroelectric projects and urban expansion, has altered the river's natural dynamics. In recent years, projects like the European Union-funded LIFE Nature initiative have aimed to rehabilitate sections of the Isar.

== See also ==
- List of rivers of Bavaria
