= Kallakoopah Creek =

Kallakoopah
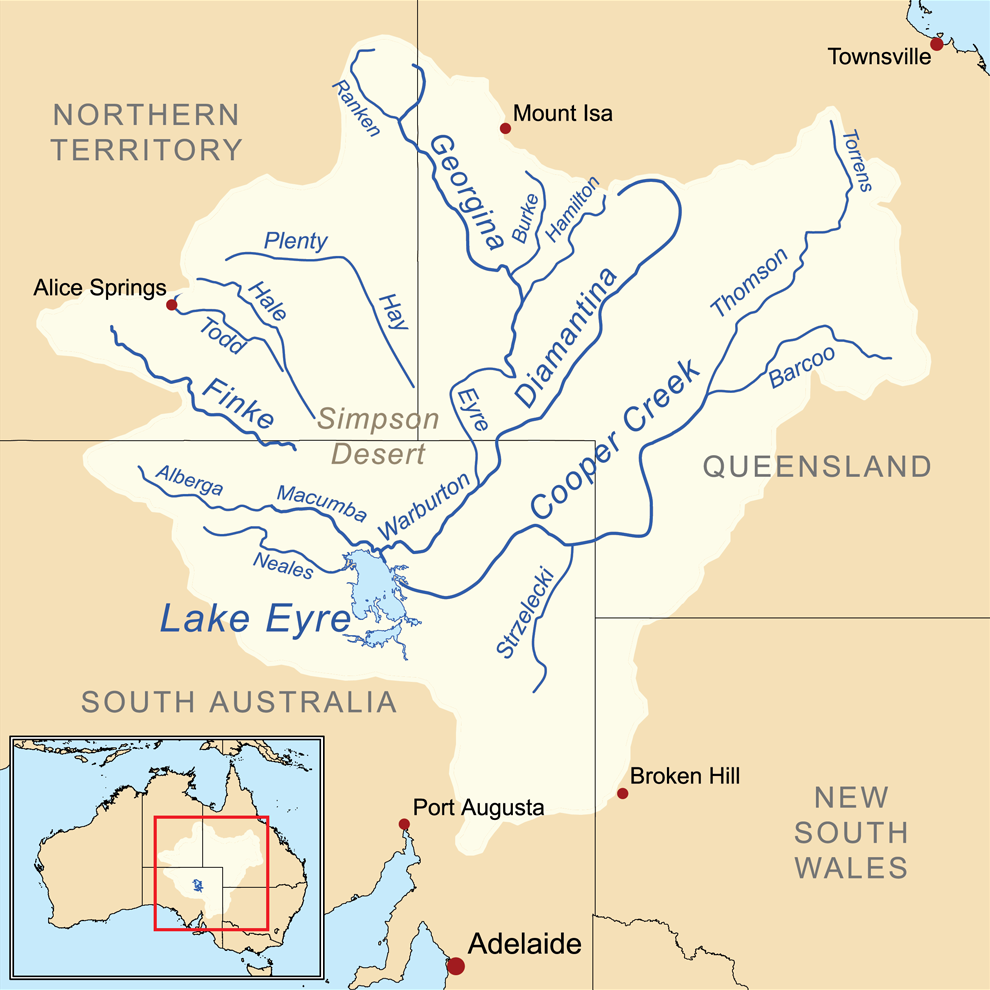
- Map of the Lake Eyre Basin showing the Warburton River

Location
- Country: Australia
- State: South Australia
- Region: Far North

Physical characteristics
- Source: Mount Gason
  - elevation: 17 m (56 ft)
- Mouth: Warburton River
  - coordinates: 27°29′S 138°15′E
  - elevation: −5 m (−16 ft)
- Length: 353 km (219 mi)

Basin features
- River system: Lake Eyre Basin
- Waterholes: Dunchadunchadinna, Kuncherinna, Anarowdinna, Kalanchadinna, Murdawadinna and Muckratuckaalinna

The Kallakoopah Creek, part of the Lake Eyre basin, is a watercourse in the southern part of the Simpson Desert in the Australian state of South Australia. It is an anabranch of Warburton Creek.

== See also ==
- List of rivers of Australia § South Australia
