= Kleine Isar (Landshut) =

River in Germany

- The Kleine Isar and St. Martin's Church in Landshut

Location
- Country: Germany
- State: Bavaria

Physical characteristics
- Mouth
  - location: Isar
  - coordinates: 48.5580°N 12.1814°E

Kleine Isar is a river of Bavaria, Germany. It is a branch of the Isar in the city of Landshut.

== See also ==
- List of rivers of Bavaria
