= Goyder Lagoon =

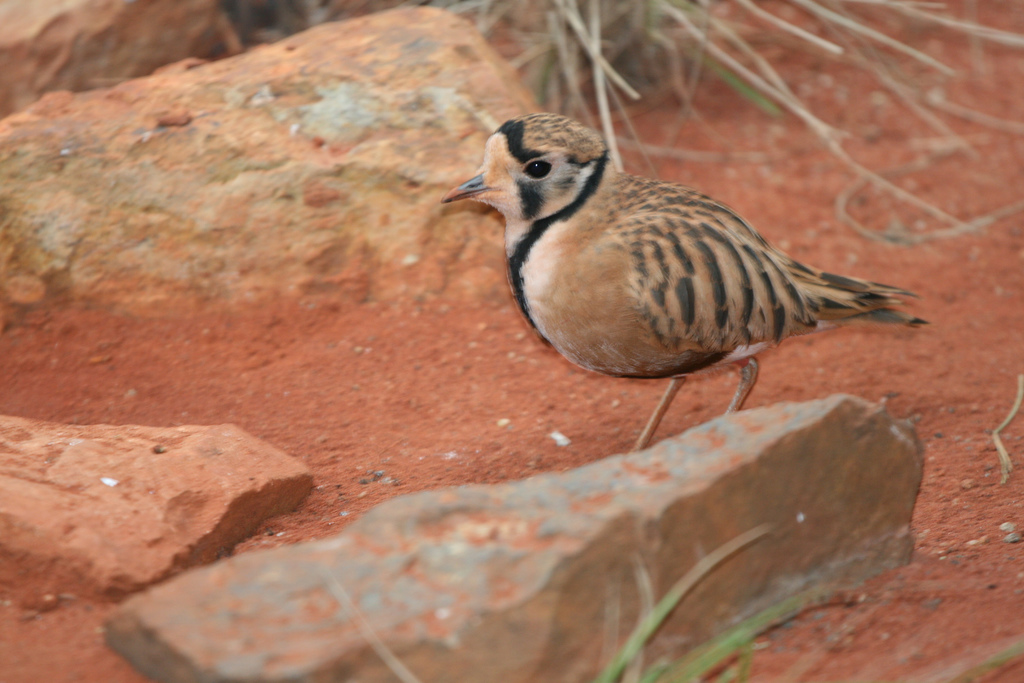
- The bird area surrounding the lagoon is an important site for inland dotterels

- Location in South Australia
- Location: Clifton Hills Station, South Australia
- Coordinates: 26°47′04″S 139°08′01″E
- Type: Salt lake
- Basin countries: Australia

The Goyder Lagoon is a large ephemeral swamp in the Australian state of South Australia in the state's Far North region. The lake is part of the Diamantina River floodplain, lying beside the Birdsville Track close to the state border with Queensland.

It is located within the gazetted locality of Clifton Hills Station, which is occupied by the pastoral lease of the same name.

Exceptionally large floods in the Georgina-Mulligan River system may contribute water to the north-western side of Goyder Lagoon via Eyre Creek and the Warburton River. Most of the lagoon consists of shallow, braided micro-channels. Median annual rainfall is 100–150 millimetres (3.9–5.9 in) and average maximum summer temperatures are 36 to 39 °C (97 to 102 °F).

Goyder Lagoon was named in 1875 by J W Lewis after George Goyder, the Surveyor General of South Australia from 1861 to 1894.

== Environment protection and other classifications ==
While Goyder Lagoon itself is not part of any protected area, it does receive consideration for protection under the provisions of state planning legislation on the basis of its location within "a variety of environments including arid and wetland environments, ranges and riverine environments". It is also located both within an area listed on the Directory of Important Wetlands in Australia as the Diamantina River Wetland System and an area of land nominated as an important bird area by BirdLife International, an international non-governmental organization, as the Goyder Lagoon Important Bird Area.

=== Diamantina River Wetland System ===
Goyder Lagoon is located at the southern extent of the Diamantina River Wetland System, which is listed on the Directory of Important Wetlands in Australia because it is considered a "good example of a major, unregulated, arid zone river with a relatively pristine biota, an exceptional hydrological environment and extensive uncultivated floodplains".

=== Goyder Lagoon Important Bird Area ===
Goyder Lagoon is located within an area of 2,684 square kilometres (1,036 sq mi) that has been identified by BirdLife International as an Important Bird Area (IBA) principally because, when flooded, it supports large numbers of waterbirds, with a total of 170,000 estimated from aerial surveys in 2002. The IBA supports over 1% of the world populations of freckled ducks, Australian terns and breeding royal spoonbills. A small population of yellow chats occurs at the Koonchera waterhole. Other bird species for which the site is important include the letter-winged kite, inland dotterel, grey and Eyrean grasswrens, black and pied honeyeaters, gibberbird, banded whiteface, chirruping wedgebill and cinnamon quail-thrush. In particular, the lagoon is reported as being the site of the largest waterbird aggregations, which are found on its southern side, including several species of cormorants, ducks, herons and ibises.

== See also ==
- List of lakes of Australia § South Australia
