= Prater Island =

Island in Germany

Coordinates: 48°08′11″N 11°35′26″E

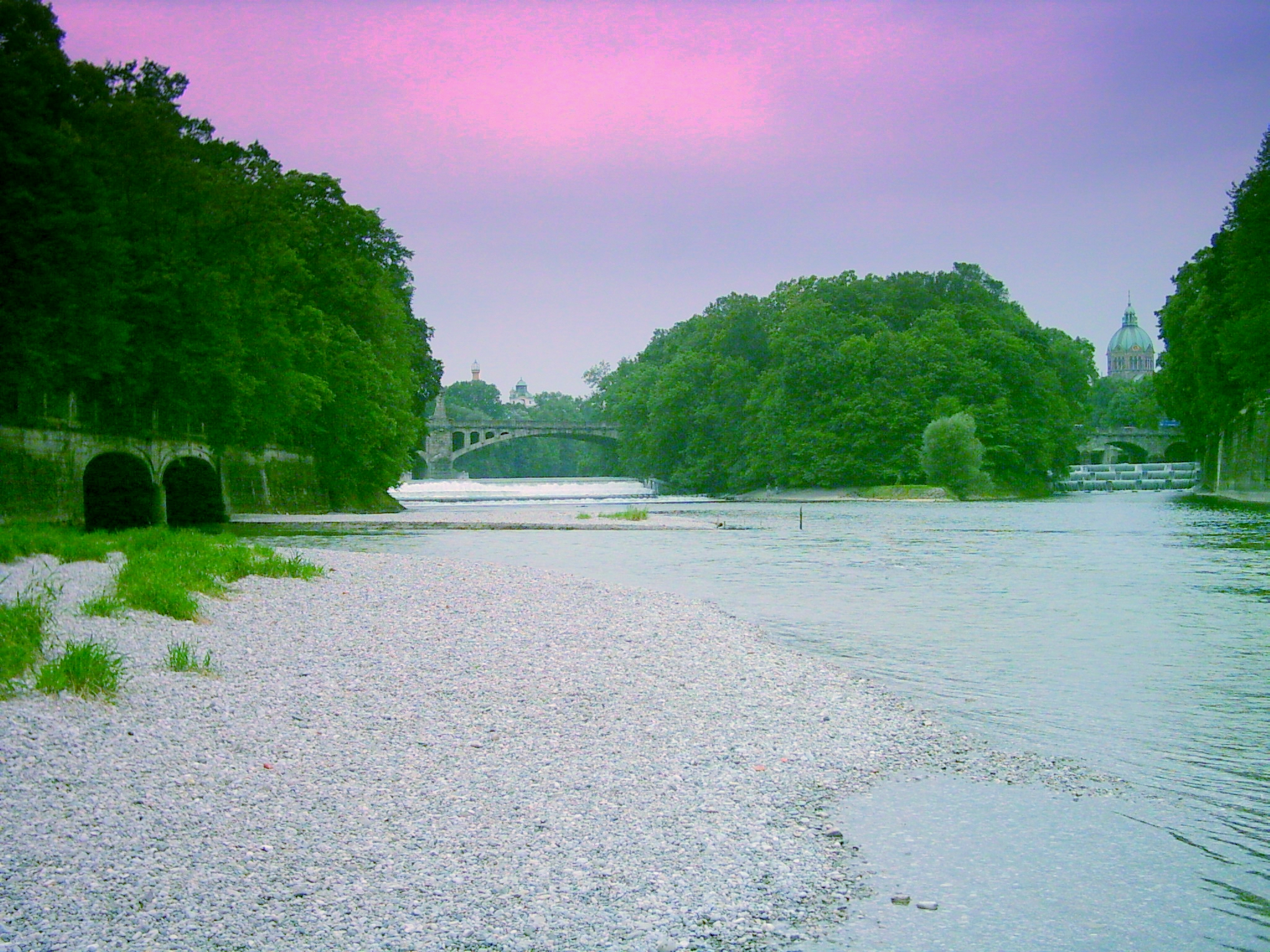
North end of Prater Island

Prater Island (Praterinsel) is one of the two islands in the Isar in Munich. The other is Museum Island.
