= Warburton River =

River in South Australia

Warburton Warburton Creek
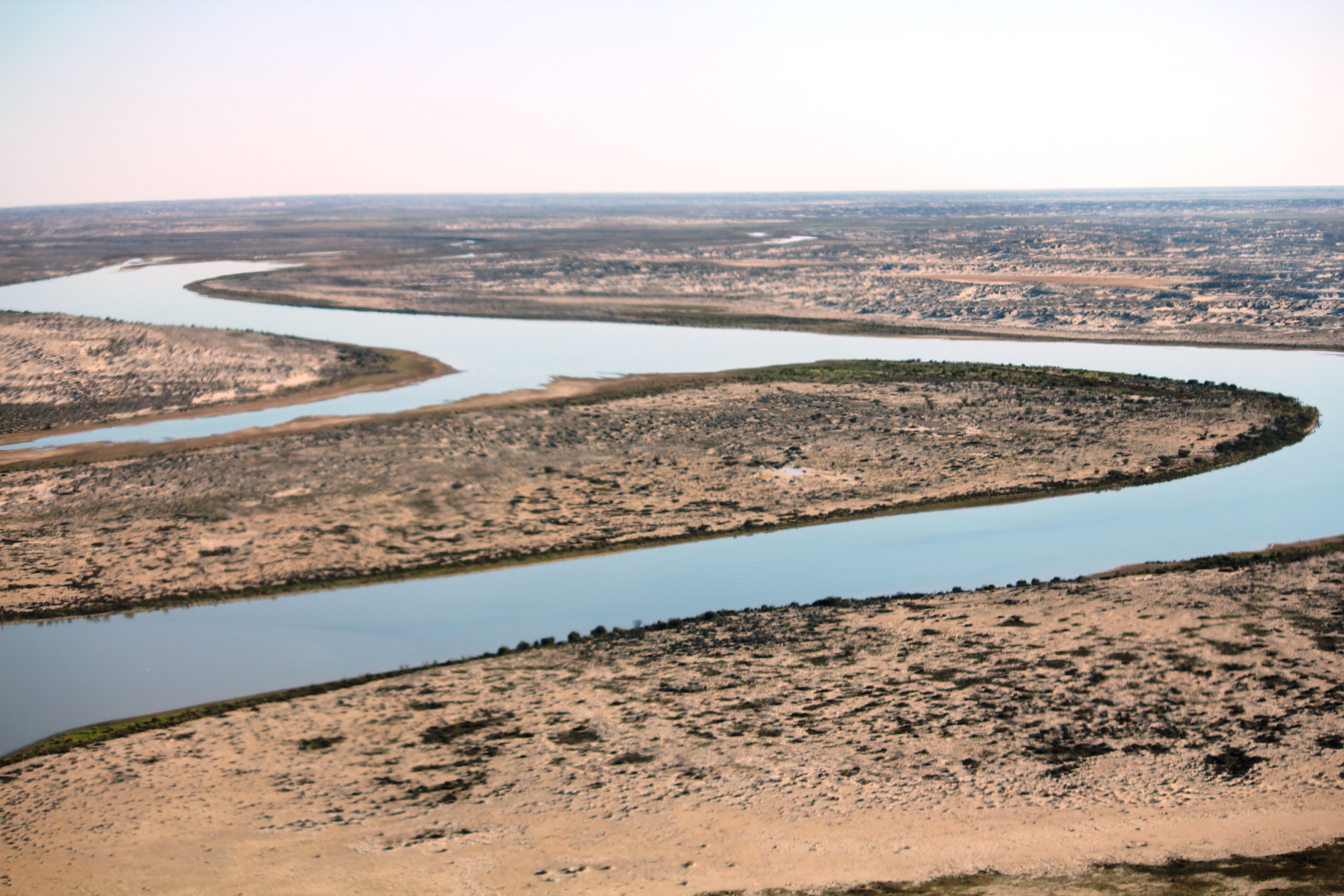

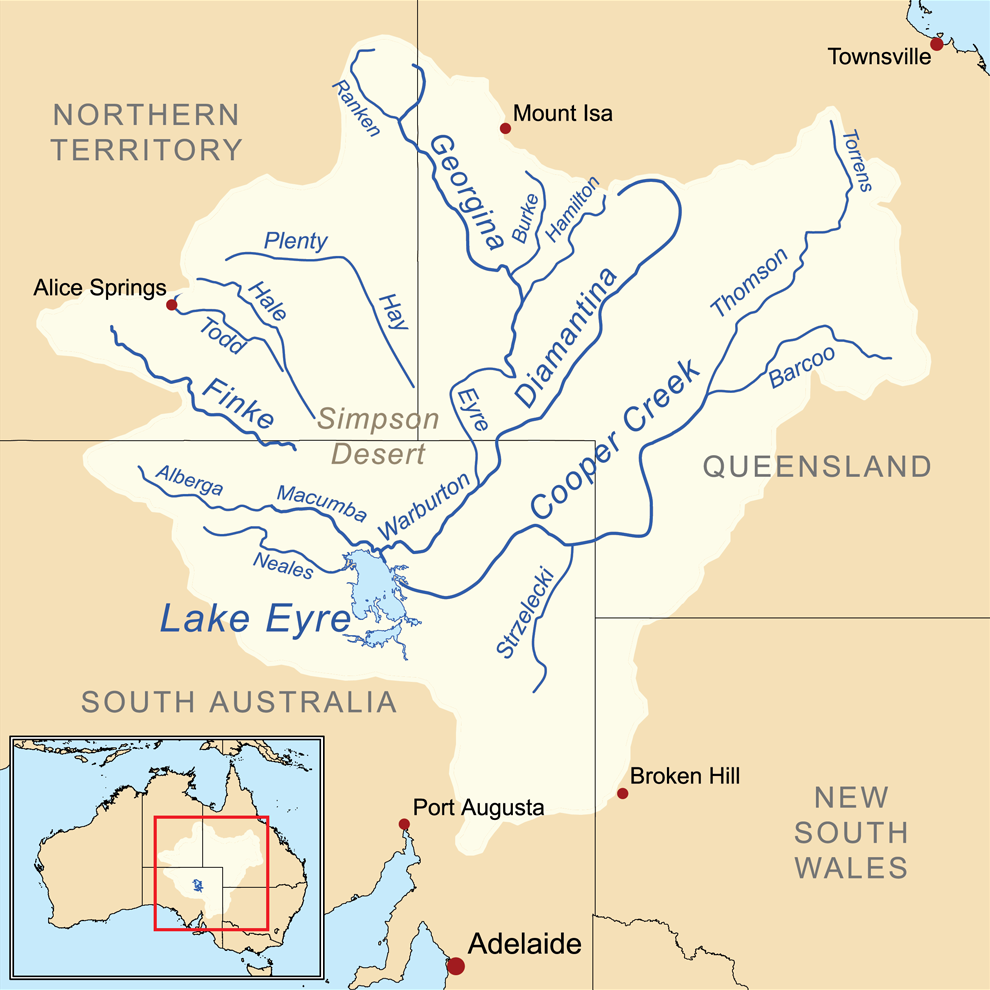
- Map of the Lake Eyre Basin showing Warburton River

Location
- Country: Australia
- State: South Australia

Physical characteristics
- Source: Goyder Lagoon
  - elevation: 24 m (79 ft)
- Mouth: Lake Eyre
  - coordinates: 27°54′36″S 137°10′58″E
  - elevation: −15 m (−49 ft)
- Length: 412 km (256 mi)

Basin features
- River system: Lake Eyre Basin
- Tributaries
  - right: Macumba River

The Warburton River (or Warburton Creek) is a freshwater stream in the far north of South Australia that flows southwest and discharges into the eastern side of Lake Eyre. It is one of the state's largest rivers, and is part of the Lake Eyre Basin. It runs along the eastern side of the Simpson Desert, and drains water from Eyre Creek, the Diamantina and Georgina rivers from Goyder Lagoon, carrying it into Lake Eyre during its infrequent floods.

The river passes through a number of permanent and semi-permanent waterholes, including the Poothapootha, Emu Bone, Wurdoopoothanie waterholes and Kalawarranna soakage.

There are seven tributaries of the river; Warburton Creek, Macumba River, Officer Creek, Kallakoopah Creek, Yelpawaralinna Creek and Derwent Creek.

== See also ==
- List of rivers of Australia § South Australia
