= Moockra, South Australia =

Moockra South Australia
- Coordinates: 32°27′47″S 138°24′50″E
- Population: 12 (SAL 2021)
- Established: 13 March 1997
- Postcode(s): 5432
- Elevation: 442 m (1,450 ft)
- Time zone: ACST (UTC+9:30)
  - Summer (DST): ACST (UTC+10:30)
- Location: 274 km (170 mi) N of Adelaide; 47 km (29 mi) NE of Melrose; 36 km (22 mi) SE of Quorn
- LGA(s): Flinders Ranges; Mount Remarkable; District Council of Orroroo Carrieton.
- Region: Far North; Yorke and Mid North
- County: Dalhousie; Frome; Granville; Newcastle
- State electorate(s): Giles; Stuart
- Federal division(s): Grey
Mean max temp	Mean min temp	Annual rainfall
25.2 °C; 77 °F	10.6 °C; 51 °F	308.6 mm 12.1 in
Suburbs around Moockra:
Willochra	Kanyaka	Cradock
Willochra; Stephenston; Hammond	Moockra	Cradock; Yanyarrie; Carrieton; Eurelia
Hammond	Hammond; Eurelia	Eurelia
- Footnotes: Location; Adjoining localities

Moockra is a locality in the Australian state of South Australia located on the eastern side of the Flinders Ranges about 274 kilometres (170 mi) north of the state capital of Adelaide and about 47 kilometres (29 mi) north-east and 36 kilometres (22 mi) south-east respectively of the municipal seats of Melrose and Quorn.

Boundaries for the locality were created on 13 March 1997 for the part within the District Council of Mount Remarkable, on 25 November 1999 for the part in the Flinders Ranges Council and on 16 December 1999 for the part in the District Council of Orroroo Carrieton. Its boundaries include the sites of the Government Towns of Hawkshaw and Moockra. Its name is derived from the cadastral unit of the Hundred of Moockra which is of Aboriginal origin and is ultimately derived from “a large rock on top of a hill” in the locality called the Moockra Tower.

The locality consists of the full extent of the cadastral unit of the Hundred of Moockra which itself covers an area of 210 square kilometres (81 sq mi) with parts of the following adjoining hundreds - Boolcunda in the north-west, Palmer to the west, Coonatto to the south, and Yanyarrie and Eurelia to the east.

Moockra is located within the federal division of Grey, the state electoral districts of Giles and Stuart, and the local government areas of the District Council of Mount Remarkable, the Flinders Ranges Council and the District Council of Orroroo Carrieton.

== Government towns within the locality ==
=== Moockra, formerly Coonatto ===
The Government Town of Coonatto was proclaimed on 7 February 1884 and is located in the Hundred of Coonatto to the immediate east of the site of the former Moockra Railway Station which closed on 4 April 1987 and which was a stop on the Peterborough–Quorn railway line. Its name was ‘altered’ to ‘Moockra’ on 20 February 1941. A post office opened in October 1887.

=== Hawkshaw ===
The Government Town of Hawkshaw was proclaimed on 23 November 1882 and is located in Section 49 of the Hundred of Moockra. The South Australian historian, Geoffrey Manning, suggests that it may be named after the English engineer, John Hawkshaw.
