= Willochra =

Willochra may refer to:

- Willochra Creek, river in South Australia
- The Willochra Plain east of Port Augusta in South Australia
- Willochra, South Australia, a locality in South Australia
- Anglican Diocese of Willochra, South Australia
- RMS Fort Victoria, formerly named Willochra
