= Wirreanda =

Wirreanda is a South Australian indigenous place name meaning "rock wallaby forest". It may refer to:

- Hundred of Wirreanda, Granville County, a cadastral division in South Australia's Far North
  - Wirreanda Creek in the localities of Cradock and Kanyaka
- Wirreanda High School in Morphett Vale, South Australia
- Wirreanda Public School in Medowie, New South Wales
