= Yanyarrie, South Australia =

Yanyarrie
- Suburb
- Coordinates: 32°19′45″S 138°34′18″E
- Country: Australia
- State: South Australia
- Region: Yorke and Mid North
- LGA: District Council of Orroroo Carrieton
- Location: 289 km (180 mi) N of Adelaide; 45 km (28 mi) N of Orroroo
- Established: 16 December 1999

Government
  - State electorate: Stuart
  - Federal division: Grey

Population
  - Total: 10 (SAL 2021)
- Time zone: UTC+9:30 (ACST)
  - Summer (DST): UTC+10:30 (ACST)
- Postcode: 5432
- County: Granville
- Mean max temp: 25.2 °C (77.4 °F)
- Mean min temp: 10.6 °C (51.1 °F)
- Annual rainfall: 308.6 mm (12.15 in)
Suburbs around Yanyarrie
Moockra	Cradock; Belton	Belton
Moockra	Yanyarrie	Belton
Moockra	Carrieton	Belton
- Location; Adjoining localities

Yanyarrie is a locality in the Australian state of South Australia located on the eastern side of the Flinders Ranges about 289 kilometres (180 mi) north of the state capital of Adelaide and about and 45 kilometres (28 mi) north of the municipal seat of Orroroo.

The locality's boundaries were created on 16 December 1999 for the “local established name” which is derived from the cadastral unit of the Hundred of Yanyarrie whose northern side is occupied by the locality and ultimately from an aboriginal word meaning “Kangaroo Urine”.

Land use within the locality is ’primary production’ and is concerned with “agricultural production and the grazing of stock on relatively large holdings.”

Yanyarrie is located within the federal division of Grey, the state Stuart, and the local government area of the District Council of Orroroo Carrieton.
