= Willochra Plain =

Coordinates: 32°28′08″S 138°13′48″E

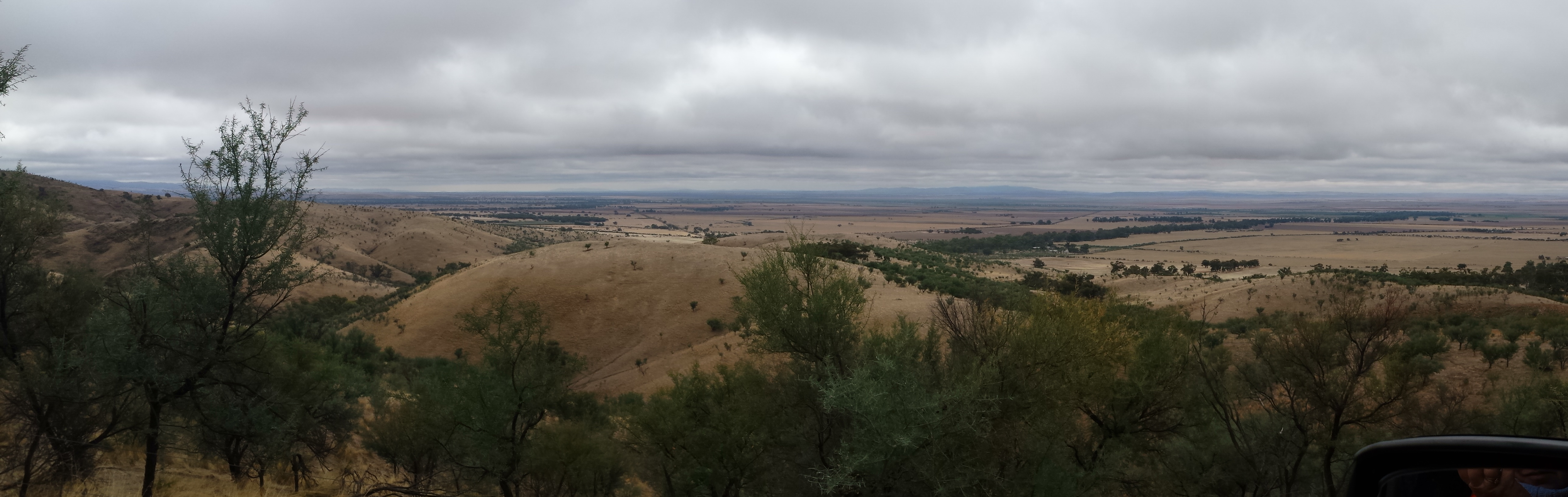
Willochra Plain from the Spring Creek Mine Road

The Willochra Plain is a wide plain situated east of Port Augusta, South Australia. The area falls in the view from Mount Brown Lookout and from walking trails in The Dutchmans Stern Conservation Park.

== History ==
The traditional owners of the area are the Ngadjuri people. The first European explorer to sight the plain was Thomas Burr in September 1842. Burr was traversing the coastal plain between present Port Augusta and Port Pirie, on the western side of the rugged Southern Flinders Ranges, when he decided to leave the coast to cross eastward over the ranges. From the eastern escarpment he found that the ranges overlooked extensive "well-wooded and watered country", now called the Willochra Plain, stretching from what is now Melrose northward toward Quorn. Burr's encouraging reports of his discoveries in this region immediately led to the arrival of European pastoralists.

The Ragless brothers were the first settlers on the plain later in the 1840s; they established a sheep station. The townsite of Willochra was surveyed in 1860 and the brothers established a hotel but the townsite was never further developed and was abandoned during the drought in the 1860s. Overgrazing and the drought lead to the saltbush cover of the land being stripped and the area became a dustbowl. The Ragless brothers survived the drought but later lost the property when it was carved up into paddocks to grow wheat.

== Geography ==
The plain is bisected by a large but ephemeral gum-studded creek, named Willochra Creek. Willochra is an Aboriginal word meaning "a flooded creek, where green bushes grow". Much of the plain lies north (outside) of Goyder's Line, which since 1865 has delineated the limits of South Australian lands suitable for agricultural settlement because of being semi-arid and drought-affected. Nevertheless, successive governments of the 1870s and 1880s surveyed and released former pastoral land for crop farming. Despite that being done on a generous credit selection basis, many settlers failed to be commercially viable due to the aridity.

As part of that process, many government townships were surveyed to service those settlers. They include Booleroo, Willowie, Hammond, Quorn and Wilmington. Some of these townships have thrived, some have merely survived, while others are practically deserted.
