= Stephenston, South Australia =

Stephenston South Australia
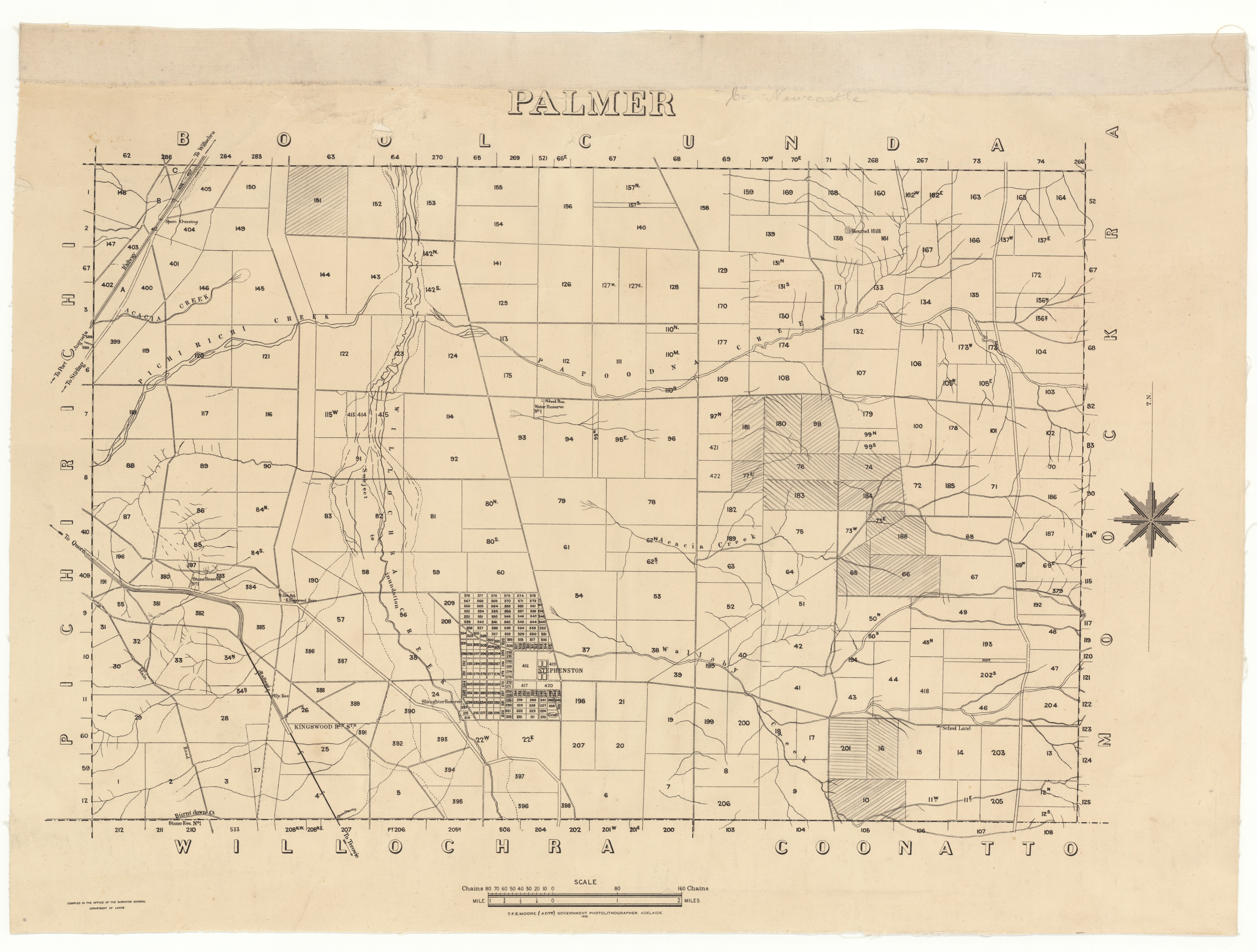
- Drawing of the Hundred of Palmer, 1938, including the layout of the former Government Town of Stephenston.

- Coordinates: 32°22′59″S 138°11′58″E
- Population: 0 (SAL 2016)
- Established: 13 March 1997
- Postcode(s): 5433
- Time zone: ACST (UTC+9:30)
  - Summer (DST): ACST (UTC+10:30)
- Location: 285 km (177 mi) N of Adelaide; 15 km (9 mi) E of Quorn
- LGA(s): Flinders Ranges Council
- Region: Far North
- County: Newcastle
- State electorate(s): Giles
- Federal division(s): Grey
Mean max temp	Mean min temp	Annual rainfall
24.7 °C; 76 °F	13.6 °C; 56 °F	269.7 mm 10.6 in
Suburbs around Stephenston:
Quorn	Willochra	Moockra
Quorn	Stephenston	Moockra
Quorn	Bruce; Hammond	Moockra
- Footnotes: Location; Adjoining localities

Stephenston is a locality in the Australian state of South Australia, located on the eastern side of the Flinders Ranges about 285 kilometres (177 mi) north of the state capital of Adelaide and about 15 kilometres (9.3 mi) east of the municipal seat of Quorn.

Boundaries for the locality were created in March 1997 for the “long established name“ which was “incorrectly spelt as Stephenson” in the South Australian Government Gazette of 13 March 1997 and is derived from the ceased Government Town of Stephenston, whose site is located within the boundaries of the locality.

The Government Town of Stephenston, which was located in the cadastral unit of the Hundred of Palmer, was surveyed in February 1879, proclaimed on 17 July 1879 and was finally declared as ‘ceasing to exist’ on 11 May 1961. A school was in operation from 1881 to 1915, while a post office operated from November 1879 until 1904.

Land use within the locality is concerned with primary production activities such as “pastoral and farming-related activities.”

Stephenston is located within the federal division of Grey, the state electoral district of Giles and the local government area of the Flinders Ranges Council.
