= Hundred of Wirreanda =

Coordinates: 32.047°S 138.516°E

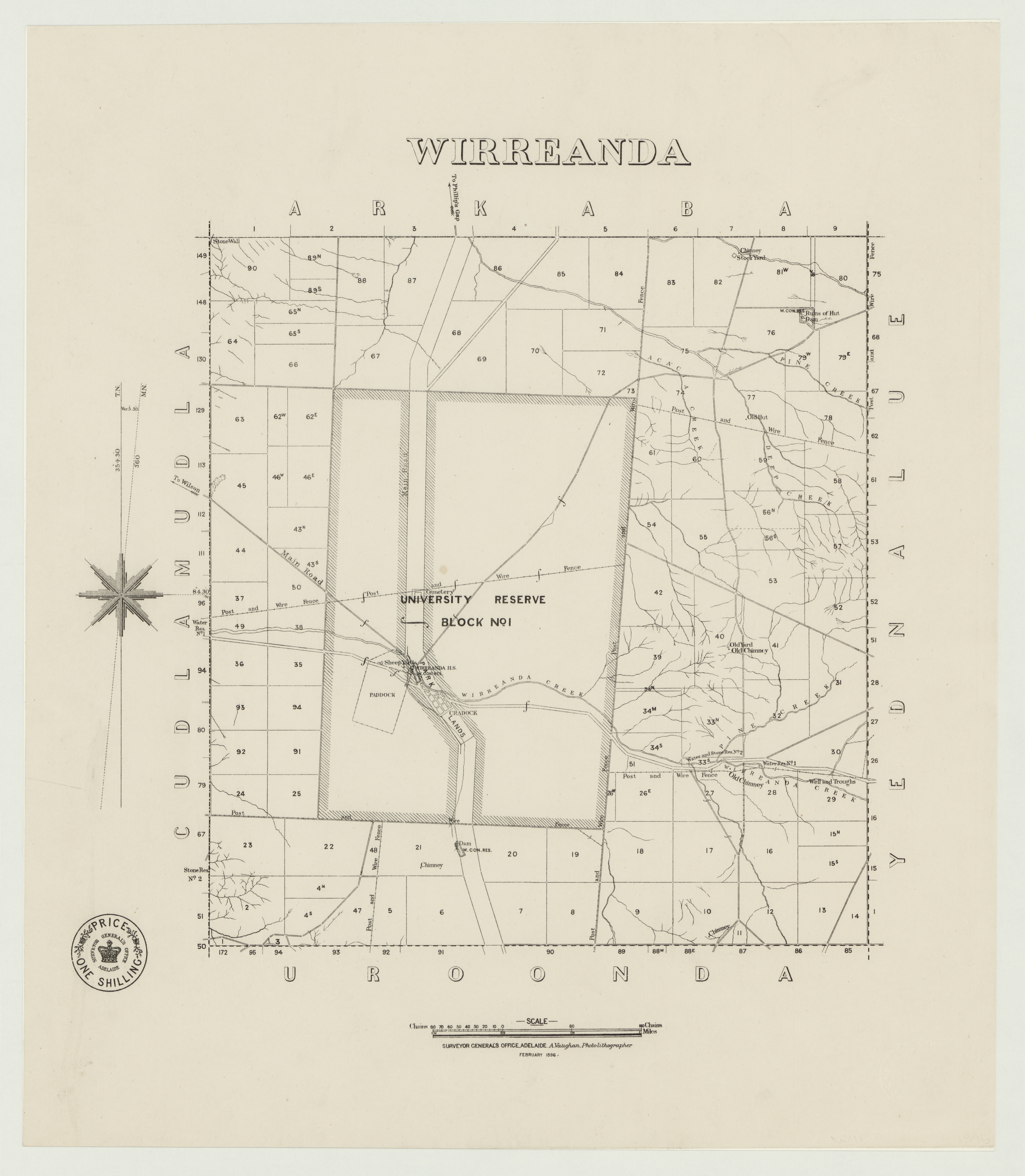
Hundred of Wirreanda, 1896

The Hundred of Wirreanda is a cadastral unit of hundred in the County of Granville, South Australia. The township of Cradock is at the hundred's centre.

The hundred is crossed from east to west by Wirreanda Creek.

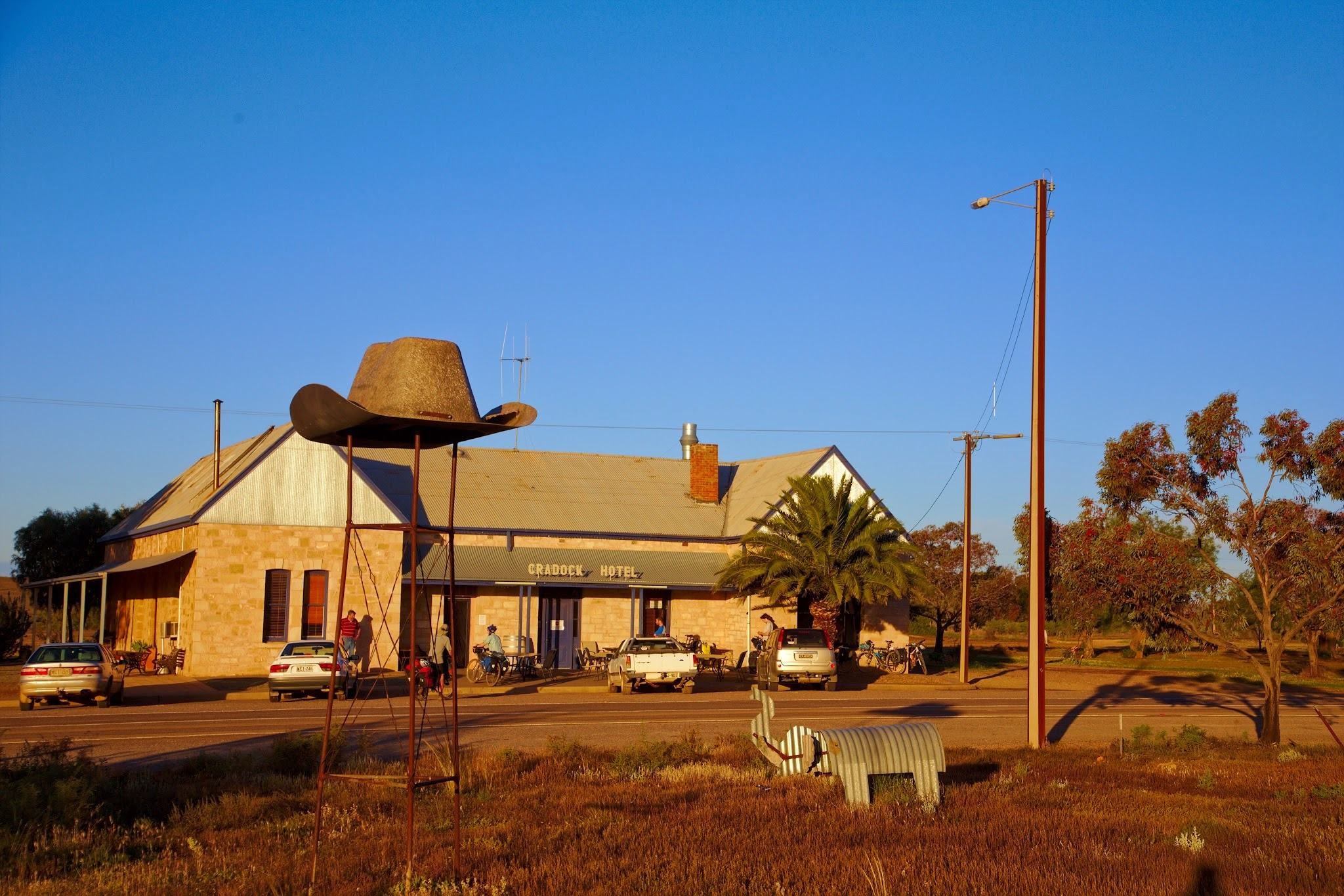
Cradock Hotel

== Local government ==
The hundred was first locally governed by the District Council of Hawker, with Wirreanda ward electing one dedicated councillor. In 1997 the hundred become a part of the Flinders Ranges Council with the amalgamation of Hawker and Kanyaka councils.

== See also ==
- Lands administrative divisions of South Australia
