= Wilcowie =

Wilcowie South Australia

- Coordinates: 32.10118070°S 138.80190192°E
- Postcode(s): 5432
- Location: 35 km (22 mi) south-west of Carrieton
- LGA(s): Pastoral Unincorporated Area
- State electorate(s): Stuart
- Federal division(s): Grey
Localities around Wilcowie:
Cradock	Three Creeks	Holowiliena South
Cradock	Wilcowie	Holowiliena South
Belton	Belton	Minburra Station
- Footnotes: Coordinates

Wilcowie is a rural locality in the Far North region of South Australia. It lies in the Pastoral Unincorporated Area of the state. The name and boundaries were selected on 26 April 2013, with the locality being named after the former Wilcowie pastoral property. The ruins of the former Wilcowie Homestead survive today.

The historic former Prince Alfred Copper Mine Precinct, which is listed on the South Australian Heritage Register, is located in Wilcowie; it is accessible via Prince Alfred Road. Prince Alfred Mine Post Office opened on 13 July 1872 and closed on 1 April 1876.
