= Quorn railway station =

Railway station in South Australia

Quorn
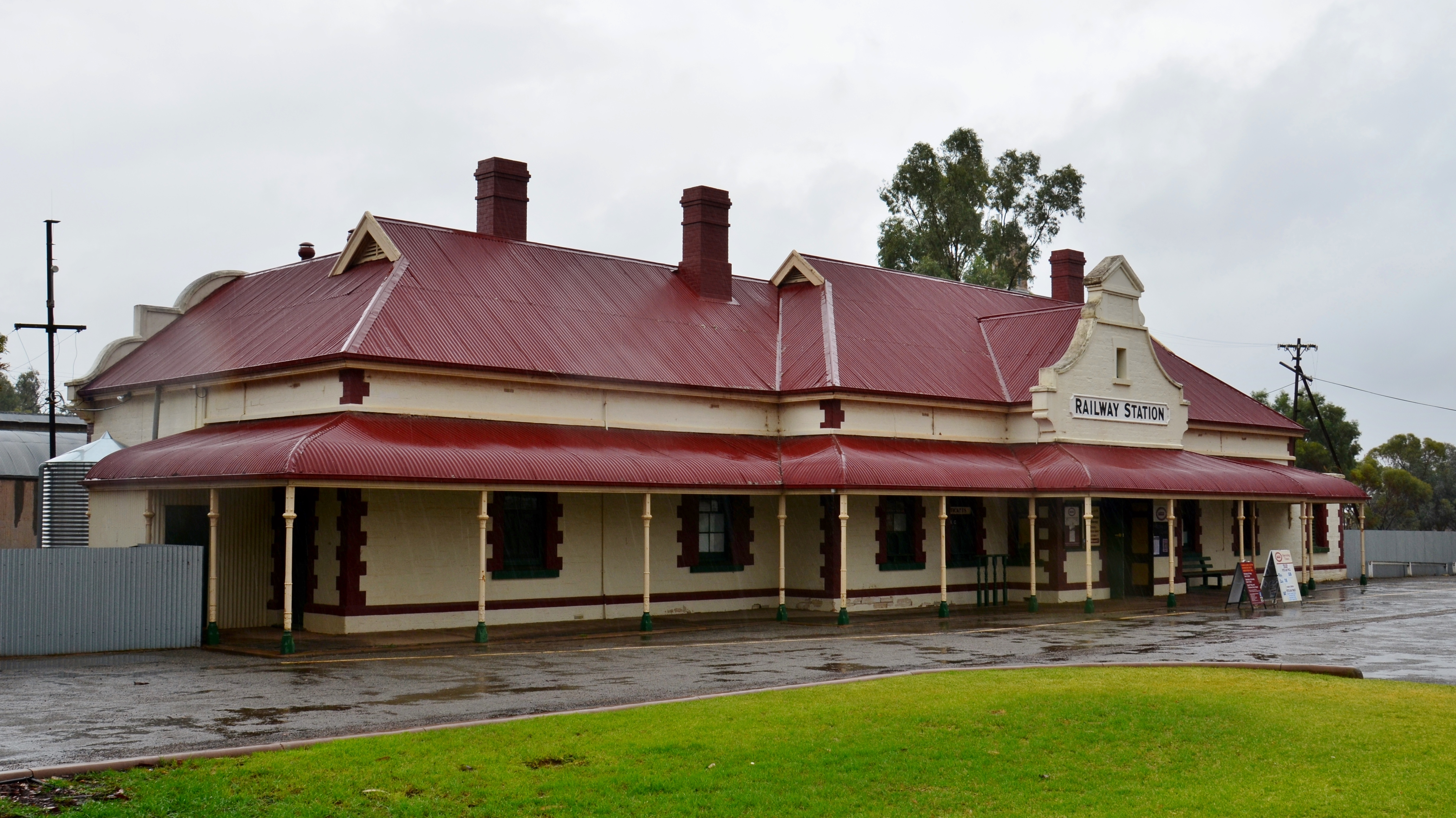
- Station building in April 2017

General information
- Location: Flinders Ranges Way, Quorn
- Coordinates: 32.20°S 138.02°E
- Operator: South Australian Railways 1879-1978; Commonwealth Railways 1926 - 1972; Australian National 1978-1987; Pichi Richi Railway 1974-present
- Lines: Central Australia Railway, Peterborough-Quorn railway line
- Distance: 374 km (232.39 mi) from Adelaide
- Platforms: 1

Construction
- Structure type: Ground

Other information
- Status: Closed (still open for PRR)

History
- Opened: 15 December 1879
- Closed: 1972
- Rebuilt: 1915

Services
Preceding station	Commonwealth Railways	Following station
Summit towards Port Augusta	Central Australia Railway	Willochra towards Alice Springs
Preceding station	South Australian Railways	Following station
Bruce towards Peterborough	Peterborough-Quorn railway line	Terminus
Location

Quorn railway station was located on the Central Australia Railway, and also the Peterborough-Quorn railway line serving the South Australian town of Quorn.

== History ==
Quorn station opened on 15 December 1879 as the interim terminus of the Central Australia Railway from Port Augusta. On 28 June 1880, it was extended north to Hawker, and eventually to Alice Springs in 1929. In 1881, Quorn became a junction station with the opening of the Peterborough–Quorn railway line from Peterborough and the south.

In anticipation of the completion of the Trans-Australian Railway across the Nullarbor Plain in 1917, and the line via Quorn becoming part of the East-West route, a new station opened in 1915. In 1937, the East-West services were diverted to a new route via Port Pirie.

In 1957, a new standard gauge Stirling North to Marree line opened, resulting in the closure of the narrow gauge line beyond Hawker. The Stirling North to Hawker section closed on 1 June 1972. The line from Quorn to Peterborough closed on 3 March 1987.

The line from Quorn to Stirling North was progressively restored by the Pichi Richi Railway Preservation Society from 1974. This section was fully completed in 1999. The final 7 km (4.35 mi) into Port Augusta opened on a new alignment in 2001. Quorn station is the society's headquarters.
