= The Dutchmans Stern =

Mountain in South Australia

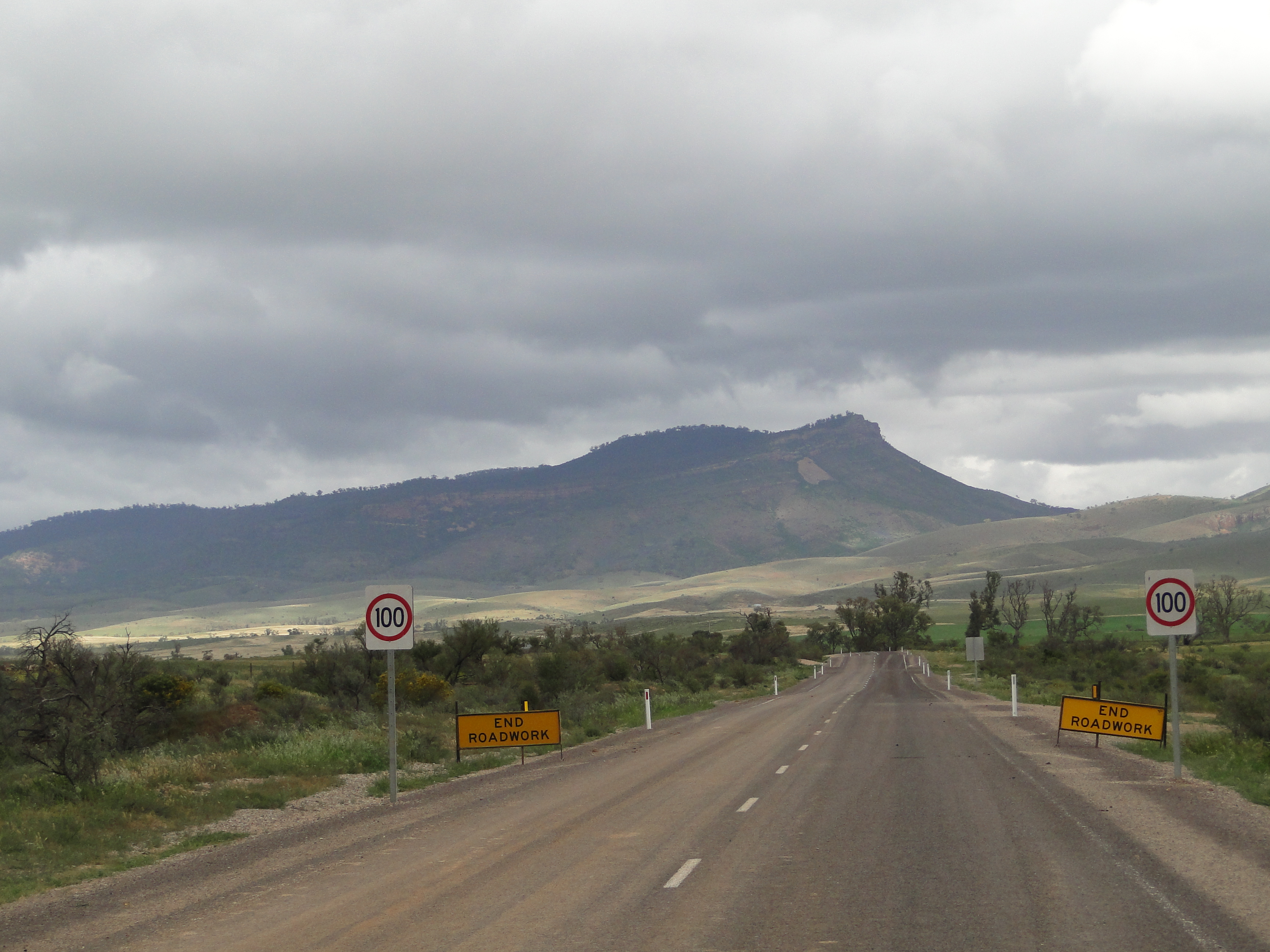
- The Dutchmans Stern

Highest point
- Elevation: 820 m (2,690 ft)
- Coordinates: 32°18′22.1″S 137°58′14.84″E

Geography
- Location within South Australia
- Location: South Australia, Australia
- Parent range: Flinders Ranges

The Dutchmans Stern is a mountain in South Australia located in the Flinders Ranges about 5 kilometres (3.1 miles) north-west of the town of Quorn and 25 kilometres (16 miles) north east of the city of Port Augusta.

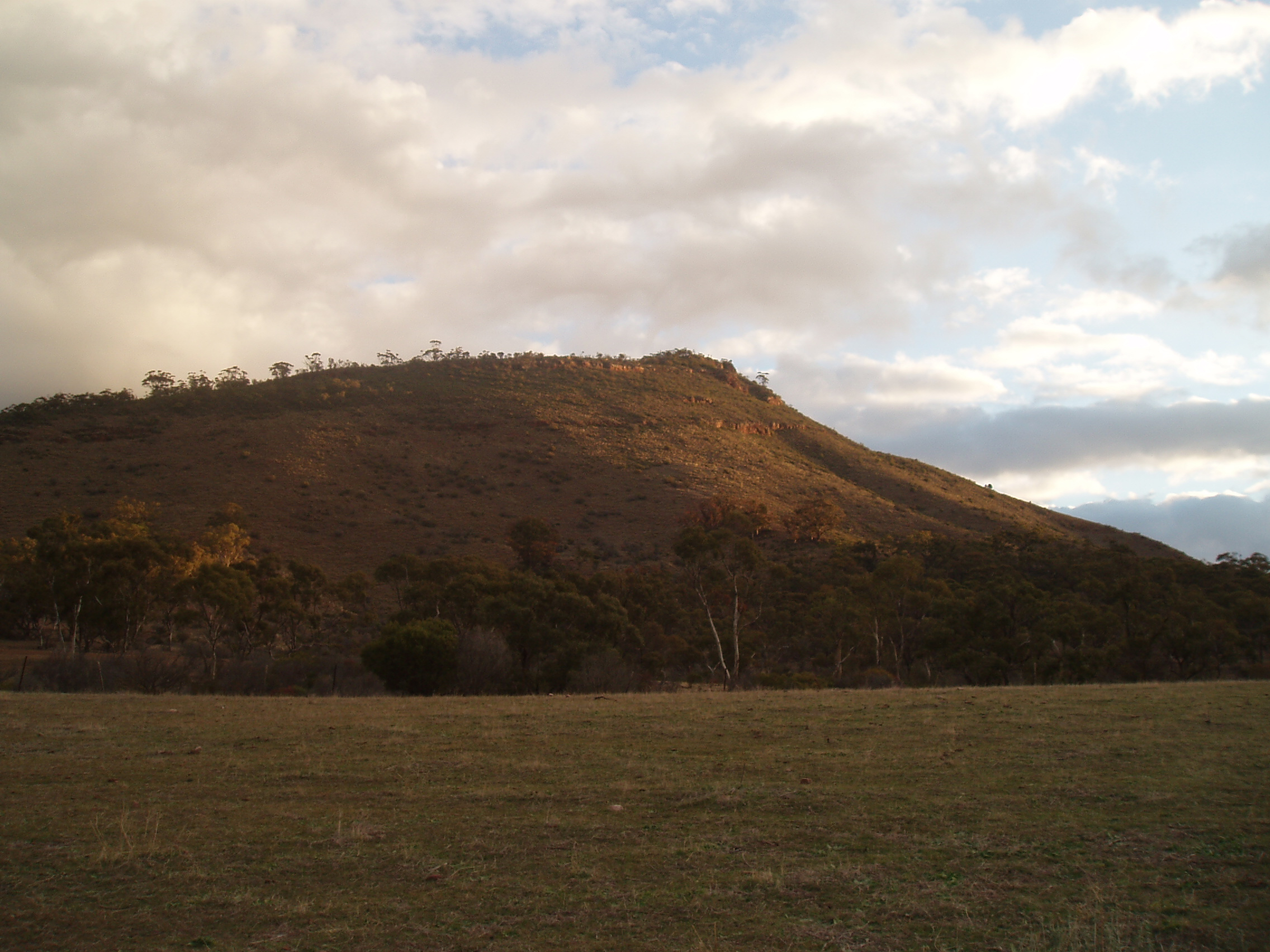
The Dutchmans Stern was so named due to its apparent resemblance a Dutch seagoing vessel in the late 1700s.

The mountain was named due to its "supposed resemblance to the stern of a Dutch vessel" with one source attributing the naming to early settlers in the vicinity while another source gives attribution to the British navigator, Matthew Flinders. The mountain has a height of 820 metres (2,690 feet). Since 1987, it has been located within the boundaries of the protected area known as The Dutchmans Stern Conservation Park where its "prominent bluff" is considered to be "the main feature" of the conservation park.

The mountain's summit can be reached via a walking trail known as "The Dutchmans Stern Hike" which starts in the carpark at the entrance of the conservation park to the north east of the summit and which is reported by the conservation park's managing authority as consisting of a loop which allows two choices of route - one being a walk of the full loop with a distance of 10.5 kilometres (6.5 miles) and a return time of 5 hours while the other is the most direct path to the summit with a total distance of 8.2 kilometres (5.1 miles) and a return time of 4 hours.

== See also ==
- List of mountains in Australia

== Citations and references ==
=== References ===
- "The Dutchmans Stern Conservation Park Management Plan 1999" (PDF). Department for Environment Heritage and Aboriginal Affairs. 1999.
- "The Dutchmans Stern Conservation Park (brochure)" (PDF). Department of Environment and Natural Resources. 2010.
- "Search result for The Dutchmans Stern (Hill) (record id no SA0021197)". Department of Planning, Transport and Infrastructure. 2013. Archived from the original on 12 October 2016.
- "The Dutchmans Stern, Nomenclature". State Library of South Australia.
