= The Dutchmans Stern Conservation Park =

Protected area in South Australia

- IUCN category VI (protected area with sustainable use of natural resources)
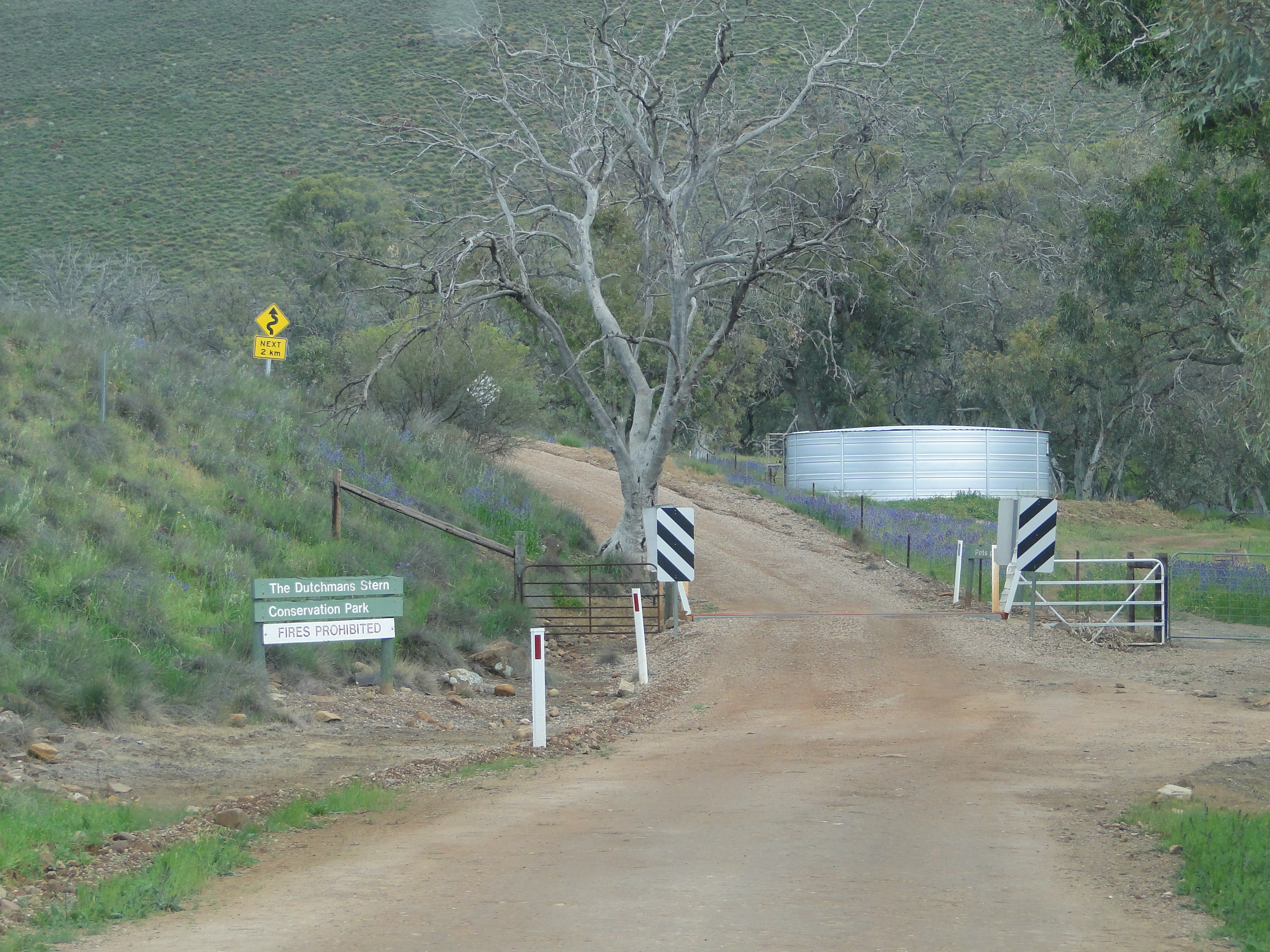
- Entry to The Dutchmans Stern Conservation Park

- Location within South Australia
- Location: South Australia
- Nearest city: Quorn
- Coordinates: 32°19′15.59″S 137°56′46.32″E
- Area: 36.95 km^{2} (14.27 sq mi)
- Established: 17 September 1987
- Governing body: Department for Environment and Water
- Website: Official website

The Dutchmans Stern Conservation Park is a protected area located in South Australia about 5 kilometres (3.1 miles) north-west of the town of Quorn in the Flinders Ranges. It includes a mountain known as The Dutchmans Stern from which its name is derived.

== Description ==
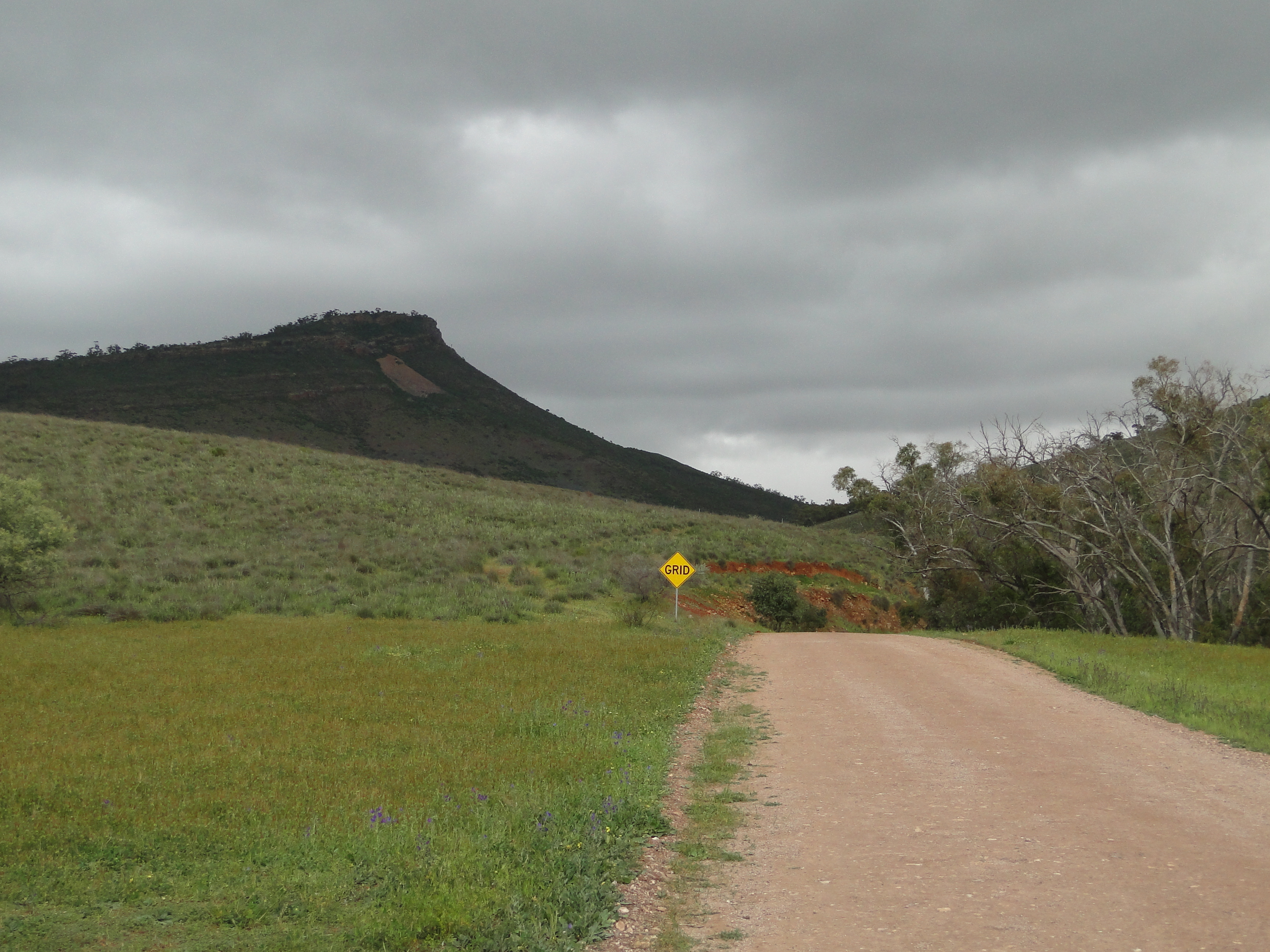
The Dutchmans Stern

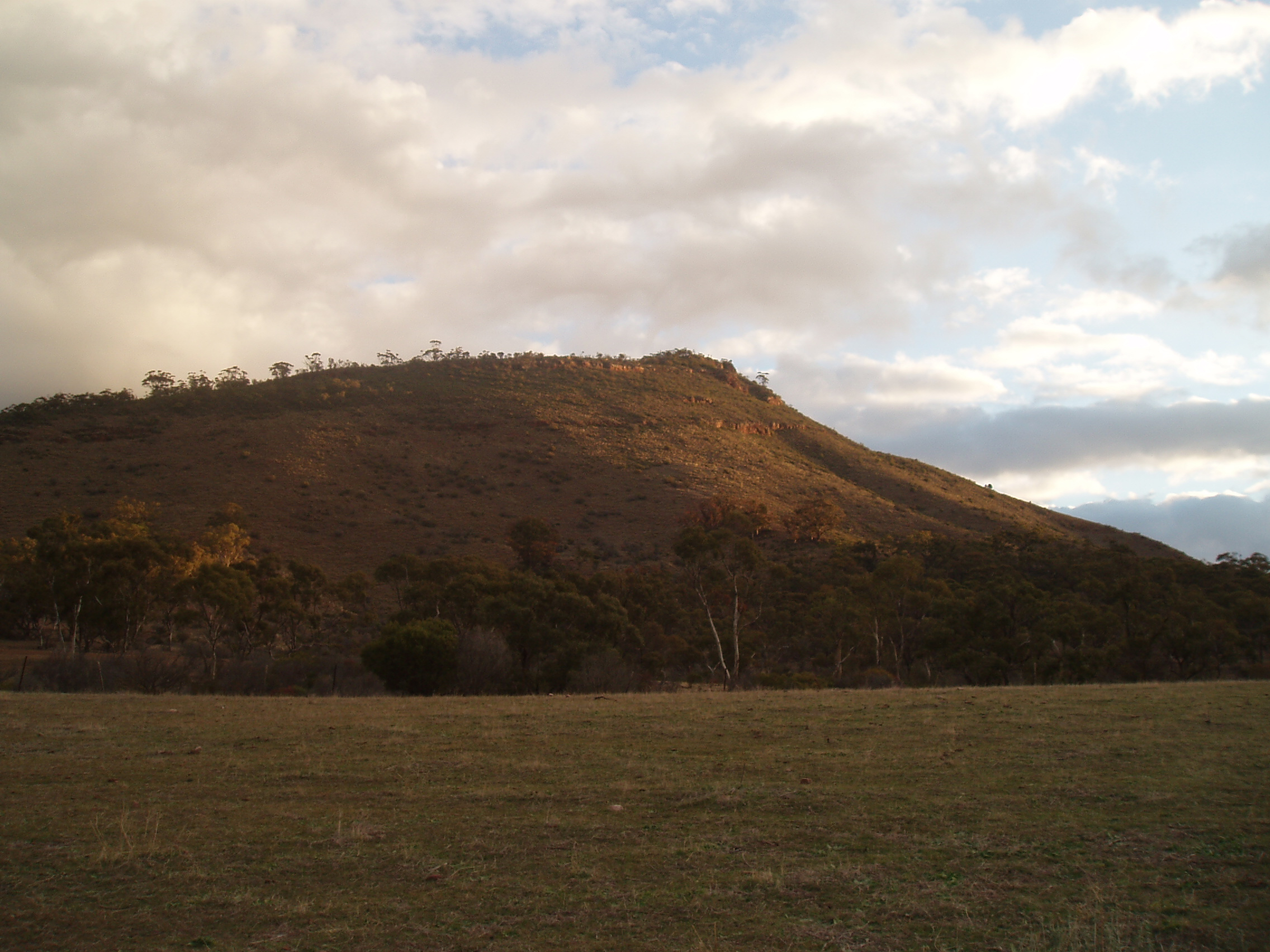

The Dutchmans Stern Conservation Park is located in the gazetted localities of Emeroo and Quorn in the Flinders Ranges about 5 kilometres (3.1 miles) north-west of the town centre of Quorn and 25 kilometres (16 miles) north east of the city of Port Augusta. The conservation park covers an area of 3,695 hectares (9,130 acres). The conservation park consists of a ridge of height greater than 850 metres (2,790 feet), including The Dutchmans Stern, a mountain located at the northern end of the ridge, and the land to the west, north and east sides of the ridge. The conservation park is classified as an IUCN Category VI protected area. The higher crests of the range possess the most northerly occurrence of Eucalyptus leucoxylon pruinosa (SA inland blue gum) woodland along middle and lower slopes and grey box Eucalyptus microcarpa in the easterly sections of Pichi Richi Pass just south of the main range. Large river red gums (Eucalyptus camaldulensis minima) can be found in seasonally damp foothills and gullies along watercourses. Sugar gums (Eucalyptus cladocalyx) (unique forest forming eucalypt) also are at their most northerly occurrence along the higher southerly facing ridges form open woodlands alongside northern Cypress pine and sheoak. Red and green mallee can be found along limestone and drier westerly facing ridges. Lace goannas, kookaburras and few other keystone species occur no further north than Dutchman's Stern range. The lower eastern foothills are clothed in quorn wattle and quorn box (Eucalyptus porosa).

== History and purpose ==
The conservation park was proclaimed under the National Parks and Wildlife Act 1972 in 1987 for:

the protection of its geological features, scenic values and native fauna and flora. The diversity of landforms and habitats in the reserve are significant factors contributing to its conservation value, particularly as much of the surrounding land has been used for grazing for over 100 years.

== Prior use of the land ==
As of 1999, it was considered that the Nukunu Aboriginal people are the traditional owners with the possibility of an overlap of jurisdiction with "the Adnyamathanha to the north and with the Parnkalla to the west". The land was the subject of a pastoral lease from the 1880s until acquisition for conservation purposes in 1985. Land within the conservation park has been used as a water catchment with Stoney Creek on the eastern side being "diverted to an engineered channel" that goes to the "Mount Arden dam to supplement the Quorn water supply" while on the western side, run-off "drains into South Creek from where it is piped to serve properties" located to the west. During the 1960s, exploration was carried out in search of mineral deposits which included works such as the construction of the Dutchman Valley track on the western side of the conservation park.

== Visitor services ==
As of 2010, services for visitors include accommodation, camping and a network of walking trails.

Accommodation consisting of the former "Dutchman Homestead and shearers’ quarters" is available for hire from the conservation park's managing authority. Camping using "low impact camping techniques" is permitted on the west side of the conservation park outside of the "Fire Danger Season" from April to November.

The walking track network which start in the carpark at the entrance of the conservation park to the north east of the Dutchman Stern ridge consists of three trails -"The Dutchmans Valley Hike", "The Dutchmans Stern Hike" and a pair of trails known as the "Upper & Lower Eastern Tracks".. The Dutchmans Valley Hike passes to the west of the ridge terminating at two outlooks with a distance of 10 kilometres (6.2 miles) and a return time of 5 hours. The Dutchmans Stern Hike consists of a loop which allows two choices of route to the summit of the ridge including The Dutchmans Stern- one being a walk of the full loop while the other is the most direct path to the summit with a total distance of 8.2 kilometres (5.1 miles) and a return time of 4 hours. The Upper and Lower Eastern Tracks pass along the eastern boundary of the conservation park. The Heysen Trail, a long distance trail, passes through the conservation park on its east and north sides using parts of the alignment of both the Dutchmans Valley Hike and The Dutchmans Stern Hike.

== See also ==
- Protected areas of South Australia

== Citations and references ==
=== References ===
- "The Dutchmans Stern Conservation Park Management Plan 1999" (PDF). Department for Environment Heritage and Aboriginal Affairs (DEHAA). 1999.
- "The Dutchmans Stern Conservation Park (brochure)" (PDF). Department of Environment and Natural Resources (DENR). 2010.
- "Search result for The Dutchmans Stern Conservation Park (record id no SA0021196)". Department of Planning, Transport and Infrastructure (DPTI). 2013. Archived from the original on 12 October 2016.
- "Protected Areas Information System - reserve list (as of 16 July 2015)" (PDF). Department of Environment Water and Natural Resources (DEWNR).
