= Wirreanda Creek =

River in South Australia

- Location within South Australia

Location
- Country: Australia
- State: South Australia
- Region: Far North

Physical characteristics
- Source: Confluence of Pendowaga Creek and Cameron Creek
  - location: 11 km (6.8 mi) east of Cradock
  - coordinates: 32°06′10″S 138°36′44″E
- Mouth: confluence with Kanyaka Creek
  - location: 4 km (2.5 mi) southwest of Kanyaka
  - coordinates: 32°06′20″S 138°16′33″E
- Length: 46 km (29 mi)

Basin features
- River system: Lake Torrens

Wirreanda Creek is an ephemeral watercourse in the Far North region of South Australia. From the confluence of Pendowaga Creek (north tributary) and Cameron Creek (south tributary), about 11 kilometres (6.8 mi) east of Cradock township, it flows generally westwards to join Kanyaka Creek, about 4 kilometres (2.5 mi) southwest of the historic Kanyaka Station homestead. The flows ultimately end up crossing through the Flinders Ranges into Lake Torrens via Willochra Creek.

== See also ==
- List of rivers of Australia § South Australia
