= Hammond, South Australia =

Hammond South Australia
- Coordinates: 32.5213°S 138.3147°E
- Population: 22 (SAL 2021)
- Postcode(s): 5431
- Elevation: 316 m (1,037 ft)
- Time zone: ACST (UTC+9:30)
  - Summer (DST): ACDT (UTC+10:30)
- Location: 40 km (25 mi) southeast of Quorn
- LGA(s): Mount Remarkable; Orroroo Carrieton
- State electorate(s): Stuart
- Federal division(s): Grey
Localities around Hammond:
Stephenston	Stephenston; Moockra	Moockra; Eurelia
Bruce; Wilmington	Hammond	Eurelia
Wilmington	Amyton; Coomooroo	Eurelia; Coomooroo
- Footnotes: Adjoining localities

Hammond is a town and locality in the Australian state of South Australia located in the southern Flinders Ranges.

== History ==
The town of Hammond was surveyed in May 1879 on the banks of the Bellaratta Creek. It is named after William Henry Hammond Jervois, the eldest son of Governor of South Australia William Jervois.

St Dominic's Catholic Church in Hammond opened in 1907 but closed on 25 June 2006. Hammond school opened in 1886 but is also now closed.

== Railway ==
From 1881, Hammond was on the Peterborough–Quorn railway line. Peterborough provided rail connection south to Adelaide, west to Port Pirie and east to Broken Hill. Quorn was on the Central Australia Railway from Port Augusta to Alice Springs, Northern Territory. After 1917, the Port Augusta end connected to the Trans-Australian Railway to Perth, Western Australia as well. Interstate rail traffic stopped using this line from 1937 when a new railway was built connecting Port Pirie direct to Port Augusta, providing a more direct path. It continued to carry some freight up until the 1980s, and remained available for occasional transfers between the Pichi Richi Railway and Steamtown Peterborough into the 1990s.
