= James Burgess (trade unionist) =

Australian trade unionist

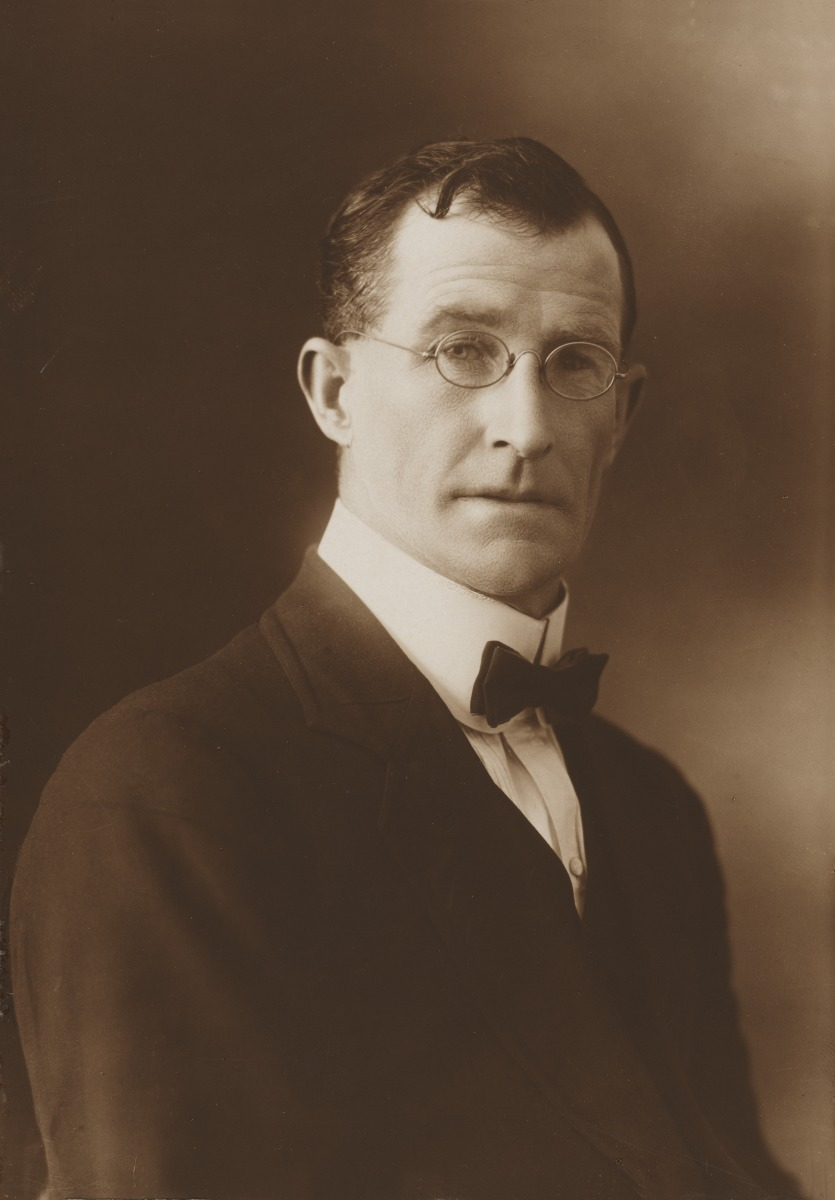

Councillor of the City of Fremantle for North Ward
- In office August 1932 – 1933
- Preceded by: George W. Shepherd

Councillor of the City of Perth for Leaderville Ward
- In office 1921–1930

Secretary of the Fremantle Trades Hall
- In office 1925–1933

Secretary of the Fremantle Australian Labor Party District Council

Personal details
- Born: 25 November 1880 Quorn, South Australia, Australia
- Died: 3 December 1945 (aged 65) Perth, Western Australia, Australia
- Party: Australian Labor Party
- Spouses: Eveline Cook (m. 1907; death 1929) Rebecca Mary McPherson (m. 1931)
- Children: 4
- Profession: Goldminer, Local Government Councillor, Shop Assistant, Trade Union Official

James William "Jim" Burgess (25 November 1880 – 3 December 1945) was an Australian politician and trade unionist.

== Early life and career ==
James William Burgess was born on 25 November 1880 in Quorn, South Australia to William Charles Burgess and Ellen Utayana Heaven, both immigrants from Gloucestershire, United Kingdom. His father was a nurseryman, forester and Forestry Department employee. At the age of 15 Burgess moved to Western Australia where he joined the Amalgamated Workers’ Association (AWA) in Coolgardie, marking the beginning of his lifelong involvement in trade unionism. While living in the Goldfields, he was a member of a prospecting party.

Burgess spent 12 years working in the Murchison region, including as acting secretary of the Day Dawn Branch of the AWA. During this period, he supported local Labor candidates, including Michael Francis Troy, John Barkell Holman, and Edward Ernest Heitmann.

== Career ==
In 1911, Burgess moved to Perth and became an organiser for the Shop Assistants’ Union in 1913. He was elected secretary of the union in 1916 when Alexander Panton left for military service. Burgess resumed the role in 1919 after Panton entered Parliament.

In 1916 As secretary of the Shop Assistants' Union, he brought a libel action against the proprietors of the Sunday Times newspaper over an article that accused him of being a "slacker and shirker" for opposing conscription during World War I. The case, heard before Chief Justice Sir Robert McMillan and a special jury, ended with a verdict in favor of the defendant.

In 1921, Burgess was elected as a councillor in the City of Perth for the Leaderville ward. He resigned in 1930 when he moved to Fremantle.

Burgess served as a member of the Royal Commission on the Metropolitan Milk Supply, established in 1925 to investigate the quality, distribution, and pricing of milk in Western Australia. The Commission, formed in response to public concerns about milk safety and affordability in Perth, examined industry practices and recommended reforms to improve oversight and standards in the milk supply.

He became Secretary of the Fremantle Trades Hall in 1925. He resigned in 1933.

Burgess began his involvement with the Licensing Bench in Western Australia in 1926. The Licensing Bench was a legal body responsible for overseeing the regulation and management of licenses for various businesses, such as those involved in the sale of alcohol. Members of the bench reviewed applications, made decisions on the granting or renewal of licenses, and ensured that businesses complied with relevant laws and regulations.

In 1932 an article in The Red Star, a socialist newspaper criticised the actions of Burgess and the ALP accusing Burgess of collaborating with the police to target Communist sympathisers and workers, leading to raids and attacks on union members. The article stated that "Jim Burgess is nothing more than a contemptible police pimp."

When City of Fremantle North Ward councillor George. W. Sheppard died in 1932, Burgess was elected with 60% of the vote after contesting the subsequent by-election caused by the vacancy. His term ended the following year in 1933.

In November 1945, Burgess was appointed Chairman of the Licensing Court, the leading position within the Licensing Bench.

== Personal life and death ==
Burgess married Eveline Cook on 9 January 1907 in Cue, Western Australia. The couple had one son and three daughters. After Eveline’s death in 1929, Burgess married Rebecca Mary McPherson in 1931. He was an Anglican and a long-serving member of the Karrakatta Cemetery Board.

On 3 December 1945, Burgess suddenly collapsed and died at his desk while preparing for the annual sitting of the State Licensing Court in Perth. Just moments before his death, he had been engaged in a telephone conversation with T.O. Davies, secretary of the State Executive of the Australian Labor Party, and reportedly showed no signs of ill health.

== Gallery ==
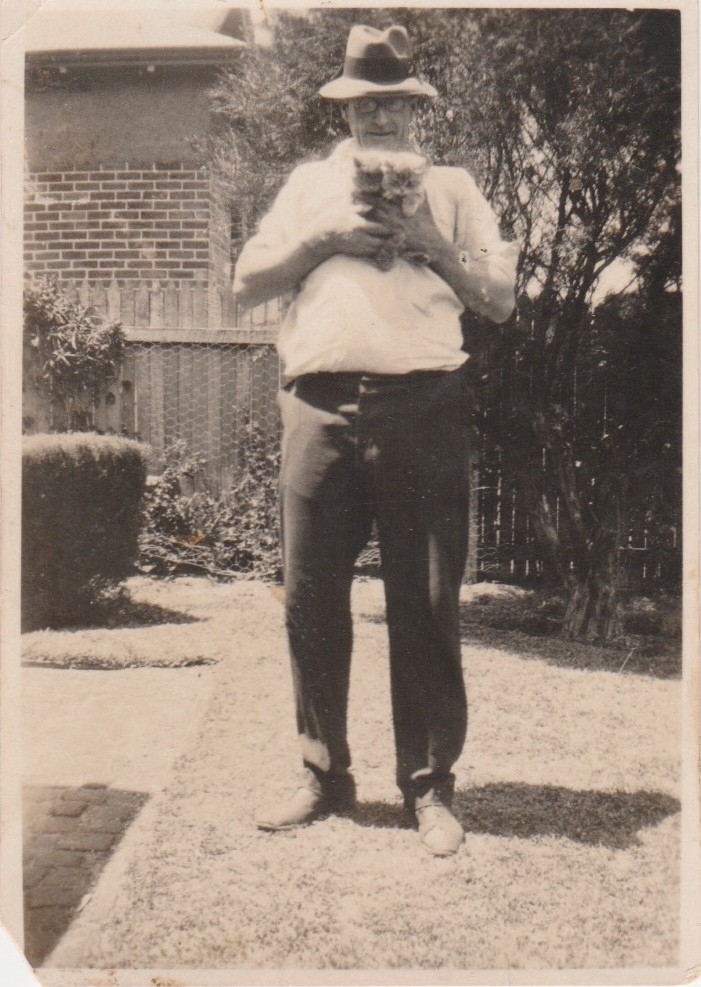
James Burgess with kittens

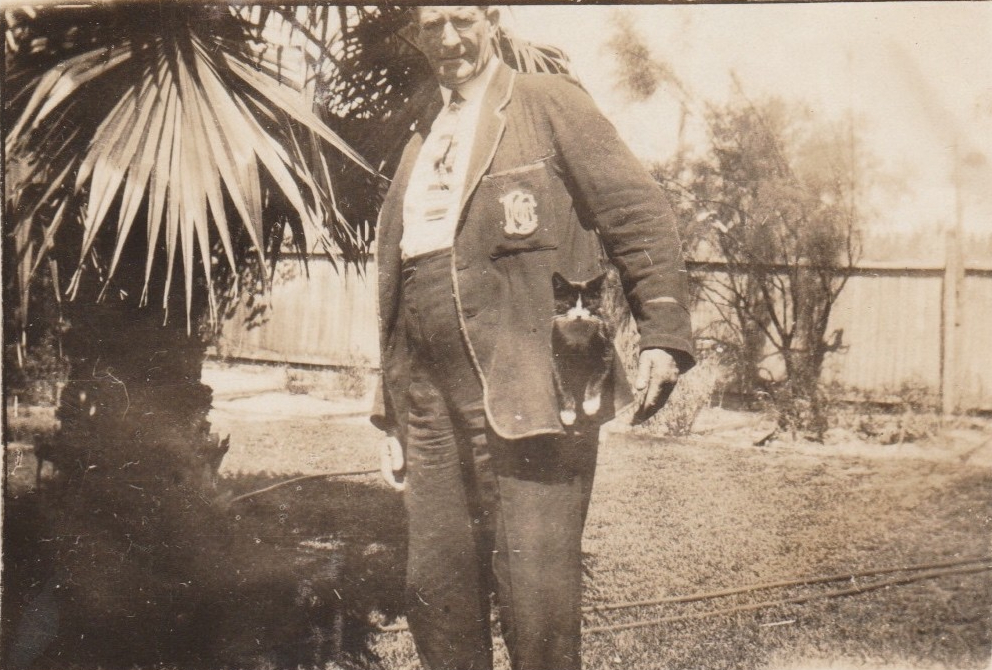
James Burgess with kitten in pocket
