= County of Granville =

Granville
- Cadastral division
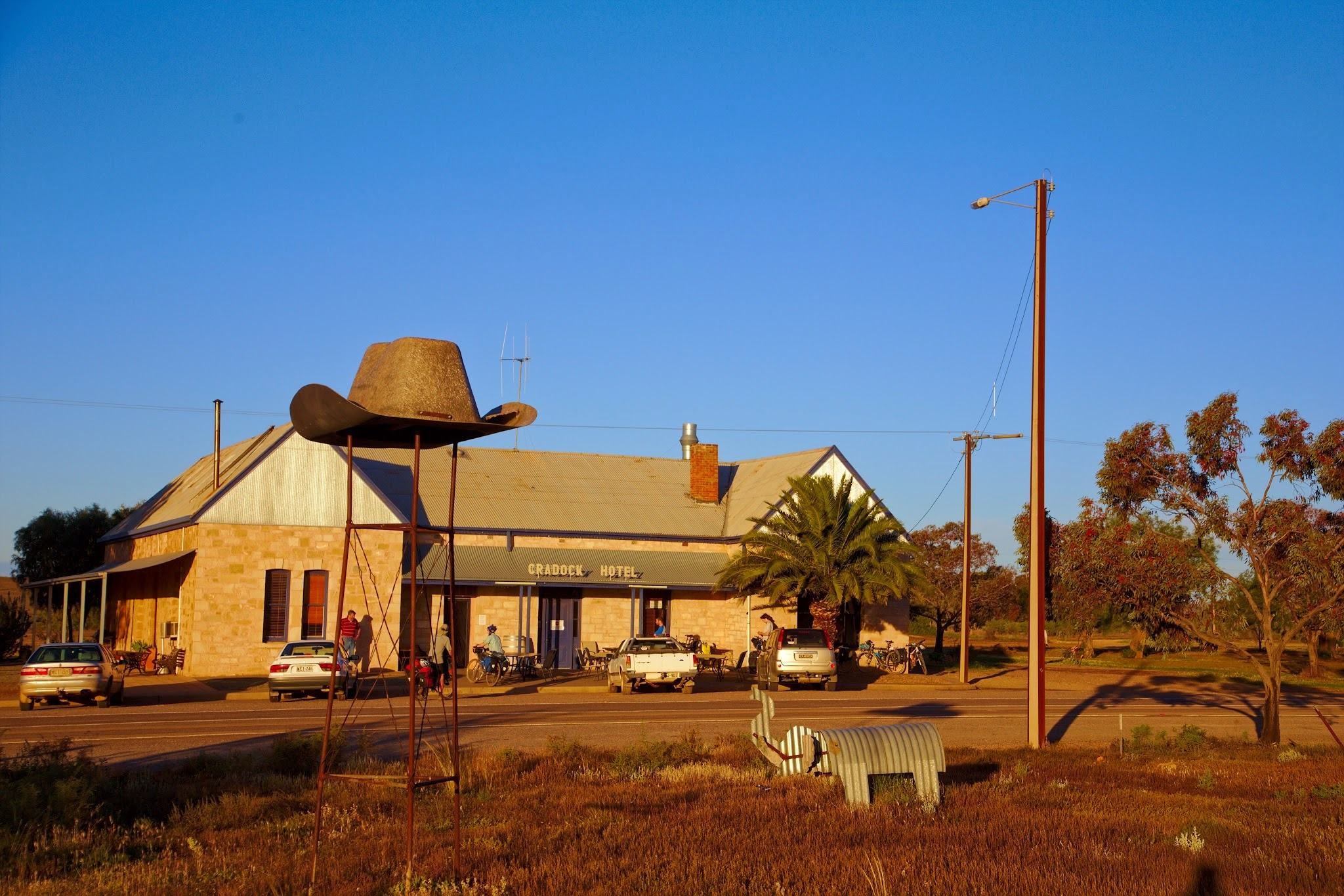
- Cradock Hotel in the Hundred of Wirreanda

- Coordinates: 32.189°S 138.767°E
- Country: Australia
- State: South Australia
- LGA(s): District Council of Orroroo Carrieton Flinders Ranges Council
- Established: 22 June 1876

Area
  - Total: 3,030 km^{2} (1,168 sq mi)
Lands administrative divisions around Granville
Blachford	Hanson	Derby
Newcastle	Granville	Lytton
Frome	Dalhousie	Herbert

The County of Granville is one of the 49 counties of South Australia located in the Flinders Ranges region. It was proclaimed in 1876 by Governor Anthony Musgrave and was named for the Granville Leveson-Gower, the second Earl of Granville and the Secretary of State for the Colonies until a few years prior.

== Local government ==
Local government was first established in 1888 by the creation of the District Council of Carrieton, seated at the township of Carrieton on the county's southern border, and the District Council of Hawker, seated at the township of Hawker just north of the county's north-western extremity. The new councils were created by the passage of the District Councils Act 1887 on 5 January 1888. Carrieton council amalgamated with the southerly-adjacent District Council of Orroroo in 1997 to form the District Council of Orroroo Carrieton, which currently is the local government body in the county's southwest. Hawker amalgamated with the southerly adjacent District Council of Kanyaka-Quorn to form the Flinders Ranges Council, which currently is the local government body in the county's northwest.

== Hundreds ==
The County of Granville comprises the following seven constituent hundreds:

- Hundred of Wirreanda, established 1877 (Cradock)
- Hundred of Yednalue, established 1877 (Cradock)
- Hundred of Uroonda, established 1877 (Cradock)
- Hundred of Eurilpa, established 1877 (Belton)
- Hundred of McCulloch, established 1886 (Belton)
- Hundred of Bendleby, established 1877 (Belton)
- Hundred of Yanyarrie, established 1877 (Yanyarrie, Carrieton)
