= Belton, South Australia =

Coordinates: 32°14′S 138°42′E

Belton South Australia
- Population: 19 (SAL 2021)
- Postcode(s): 5432
- Location: 300 km (186 mi) N of Adelaide; 57 km (35 mi) NE of Orroroo
- LGA(s): Orroroo Carrieton
- Region: Yorke and Mid North
- County: Granville
- State electorate(s): Stuart
- Federal division(s): Grey
Localities around Belton:
Cradock	Cradock	Wilcowie
Yanyarrie	Belton	Minburra Station
Carrieton	Johnburgh	North Hills; Yalpara
- Footnotes: Locations; Adjoining localities

Belton is a rural locality in South Australia, located in the District Council of Orroroo Carrieton. It is traversed by the Carrieton-Barata Road, the Carrieton-Belton Road and the Weira Creek. The locality was established on 26 April 2013 in respect to "the long established local name."

== History ==
The European settlement of the area which now forms the modern locality of Belton was first formalised as three cadastral hundreds when the area was opened up for pastoral purposes: the Hundred of Eurilpa, the Hundred of McCulloch, and the Hundred of Bendleby. The Hundred of Eurilpa and the Hundred of Bendleby were proclaimed in January 1877 by Governor Anthony Musgrave, followed by the Hundred of McCulloch in February 1886 by Governor William C. F. Robinson, named for state MP Alexander McCulloch. The latter two hundreds remained almost entirely pastoral, although a Bendleby Post Office opened on 17 February 1891 and closed on 22 May 1919. A former unbounded locality in the Hundred of Eurilpa, Uroonda, also now lies within the boundaries of Belton. Uroonda Post Office opened on 1 April 1883 and closed around 1908.

The government town of Belton was proclaimed in 1882 by Governor William Jervois in the Hundred of Eurilpa. A school opened in 1886, but closed a short time after; a provisional school opened again in 1889; it too later closed. The town had a branch of the South Australian Farmers Association from 1885 to 1887. Drought was a perennial problem, as the town lies north of Goyder's Line. Belton Post Office opened on 1 April 1883, provisionally closed on 31 December 1968, and closed permanently on 31 March 1969. The town also possessed a store for a number of years.

The locality of Belton includes the site of the government town of Cobham which was proclaimed on 1 February 1883 and which was cancelled on 8 July 1915.
