= Peterborough railway station, South Australia =

Railway station in South Australia

Peterborough
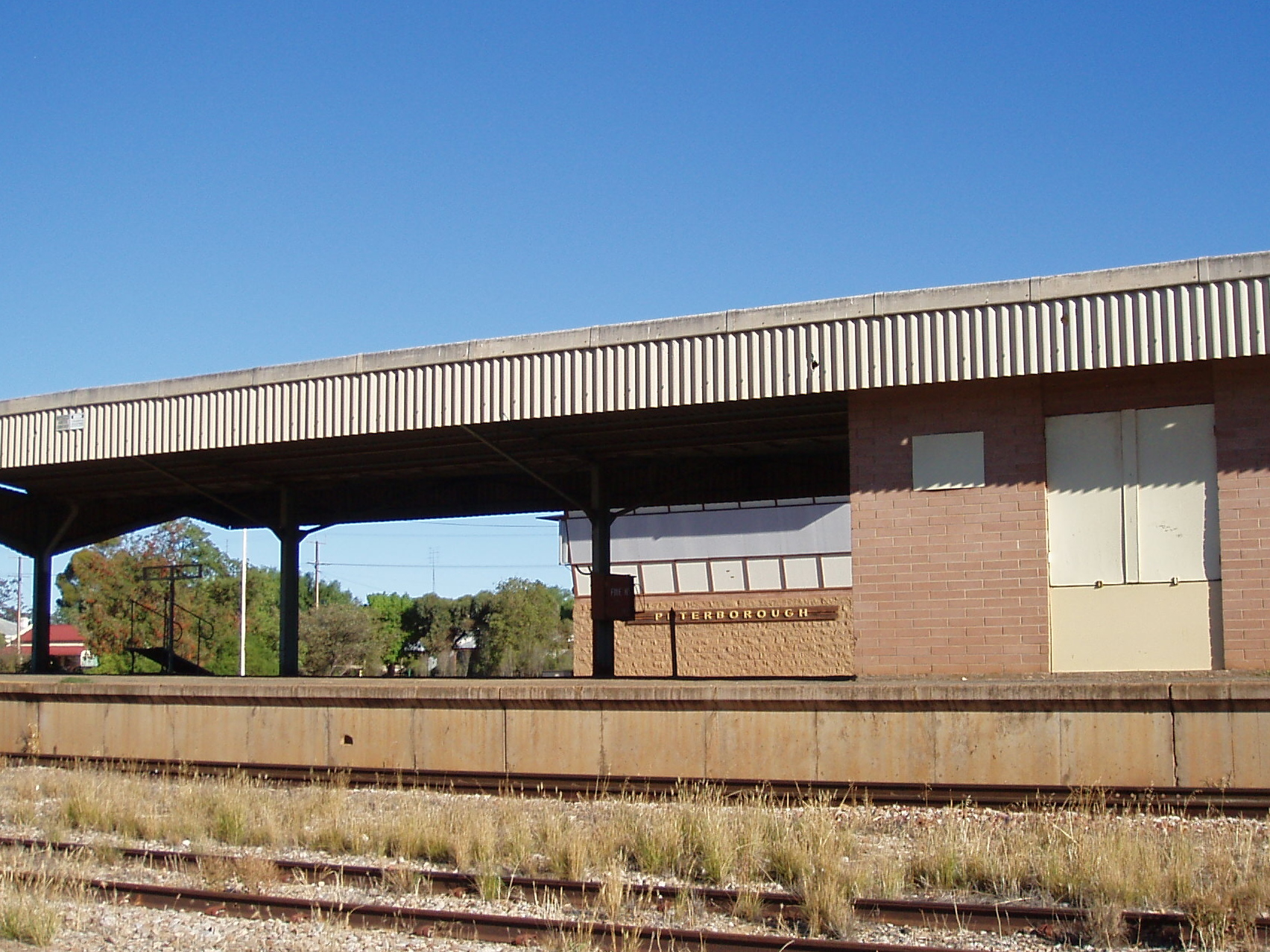
- Station in March 2009

General information
- Location: Main Street, Peterborough; Australia
- Coordinates: 32.9742°S 138.8364°E
- Line: Crystal Brook-Broken Hill
- Distance: 247.50 kilometres from Adelaide
- Platforms: 1

Construction
- Structure type: Ground

Other information
- Status: Unstaffed

History
- Opened: January 1881
- Former names: Petersburg
Location

Peterborough railway station is located on the Crystal Brook-Broken Hill line in Peterborough, South Australia.

== History ==
Peterborough originally opened in January 1880 as Petersburg when a narrow gauge line opened from Port Pirie to the west. In November 1881, a line arrived from Terowie and the south, in 1882 it was extended north to Quorn. In 1888, a line was built eastwards to Broken Hill.

Thus Petersburg became a four-way junction station (all narrow gauge) and the town was the headquarters for the South Australian Railways narrow gauge network, with an extensive locomotive depot. A roundhouse was added in 1927. The roundhouse and turntable are listed on the South Australian Heritage Register. The station along with the town, was renamed Peterborough in 1917.

As part of the standardisation project, the line between Port Augusta and Broken Hill was converted to standard gauge in 1970, thus Peterborough became a break of gauge station. As part of the project, the narrow gauge from Terowie was converted to broad gauge to match the rest of the line to Terowie from Adelaide resulting in Peterborough having all three South Australian track gauges.

Following the conversion of the Adelaide to Crystal Brook line to standard gauge in 1982, Peterborough's importance diminished. By 1988, both the narrow gauge line to the north and broad gauge line to the south had closed. Today the former roundhouse is home to the Steamtown Heritage Rail Centre.

== Services ==
Journey Beyond's weekly Indian Pacific service passes Peterborough on its route but does not stop at the station.
