= Willochra Creek =

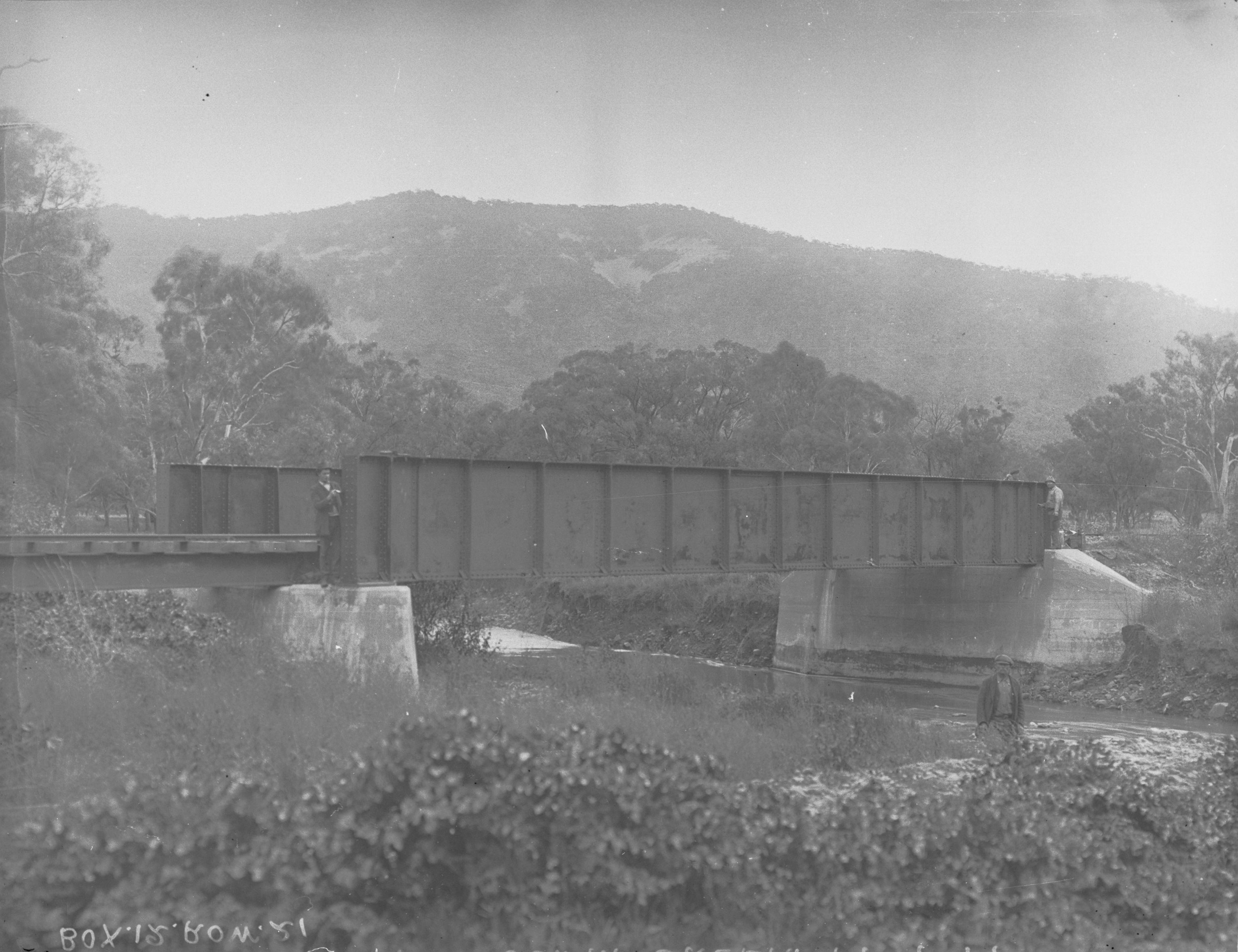
- Willochra Creek Railway Bridge, 1917

- Location within South Australia

Location
- Country: Australia
- State: South Australia
- Region: Far North

Physical characteristics
- Source: Mount Remarkable 5 kilometres (3.1 mi) east north east of Melrose
  - coordinates: 32°48′16″S 138°08′20″E
- Mouth: Lake Torrens
  - location: 61 km (38 mi) due west of Hawker
  - coordinates: 31°51′30″S 137°46′56″E

Basin features
- River system: Lake Torrens

Willochra Creek is an ephemeral watercourse in the Far North region of South Australia. From Mount Remarkable, where it is also known as Mount Remarkable Creek, it flows generally eastwards to Melrose township at the foot of the mount. It thence flows generally northwards east of Mount Remarkable National Park across the eponymous Willochra Plain and through the locality of Bruce to the locality of Willochra itself at the heart of the plain. In Willochra locality the creek is also known as the Willochra Overflow and is joined by Boolcunda Creek. Being assisted by flows from several other water courses north of Willochra locality, the flows ultimately end up crossing through a sharp gorge in the Flinders Ranges north of Mount Stephen and into the south end of Lake Torrens about 61 kilometres (38 mi) due west of Hawker.

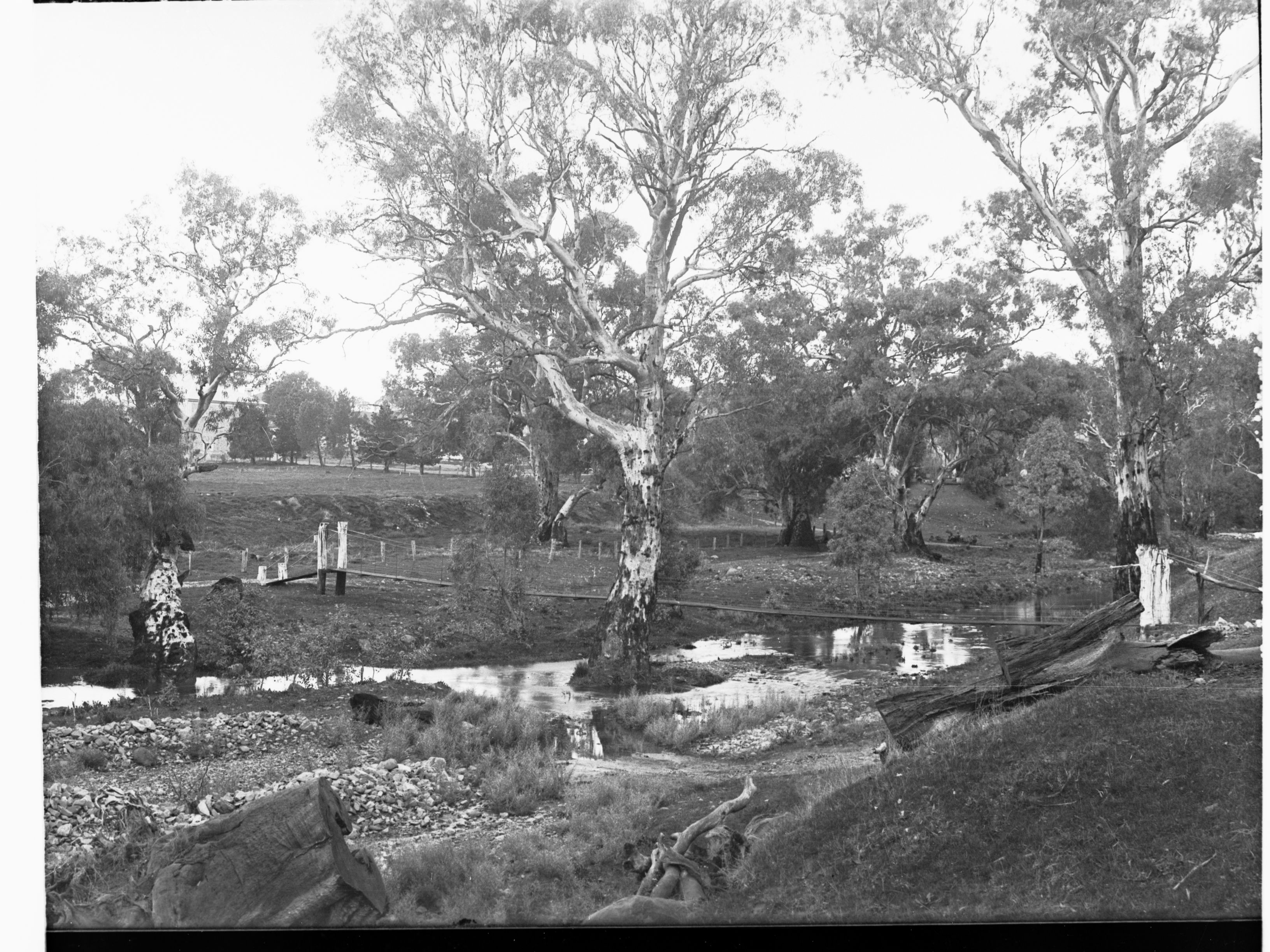
Suspension bridge over Willochra Creek, Melrose

== See also ==
- List of rivers of Australia § South Australia
