= Peterborough–Quorn railway line =

Former railway line in South Australia

Overview
- Status: Closed & removed
- Coordinates: 32°36′15.0″S 138°33′32.4″E
- Termini: Peterborough; Quorn
- Continues from: Roseworthy-Peterborough line
- Continues as: Stirling North-Hawker line

Service
- System: South Australian Railways
- Operator(s): South Australian Railways; Australian National

History
- Opened: Peterborough-Orroroo: 23 November 1881; Orroroo-Quorn: 22 May 1882
- Closed: Eurelia-Quorn: 3 March 1987; Peterborough-Eurelia: 22 November 1988

Technical
- Line length: 130.2 km (80.9 mi)
- Track gauge: 1,067 mm (3 ft 6 in)

The Peterborough–Quorn railway line was a 3 ft 6 in (1,067 mm) railway line on the South Australian Railways network. Located in the upper Mid North of South Australia, it opened from Peterborough to Orroroo on 23 November 1881, being extended to Quorn on 22 May 1882.

== History ==
The stations south to north on the line were Peterborough, Black Rock, Orroroo, Walloway, Eurelia, Carrieton, Moockra, Hammond, Bruce and Quorn.

At the time the Peterborough–Quorn line was built, Quorn was on the Central Australia Railway from Port Augusta to Farina, later extended to Oodnadatta, then Alice Springs. Peterborough was on the Port Pirie–Broken Hill railway line, later linking to Sydney, and it was also on a line to Adelaide. Consequently the Peterborough–Quorn line was a link in the north-south transcontinental transport corridor linking Adelaide to Darwin, with the northern part being by camel train and then road transport from the 1920s.

Following the opening of the Trans-Australian Railway from Port Augusta to Kalgoorlie, in 1917, the Peterborough–Quorn line became part of the main east-west railway across Australia from Sydney via Melbourne to Perth, with another link from Sydney via Broken Hill opening in 1927. This transcontinental route via Quorn ceased in 1937 when the Trans-Australian Railway was extended to Port Pirie.

The Peterborough-Quorn line lost its north-south transcontinental traffic in 1957 when a new standard gauge line was opened between Port Augusta/Stirling North and Marree.

The line between Eurelia and Quorn closed on 3 March 1987, and between Peterborough and Eurelia on 22 November 1988. After closure, part of the line was used by the Steamtown Peterborough Railway Preservation Society.
