= Hundred of Yanyarrie =

The Hundred of Yanyarrie is a hundred within County of Granville, South Australia.

== History ==
It was proclaimed on 18 January 1877 and its school opened in 1882 but closed in 1954.

"The Yanyarrie Post Office opened in June 1878 and the Yanyarrie School in 1873; the latter closed in 1954. The Yanyarrie Whim Post Office, opened in 1877 between Eurelia and Yanyarrie on the Hallett- Blinman postal line, was renamed ‘Carrieton’ in April 1888. In 1884, Messrs Burgoyne and Coglin, MP’s, presented to the Minister of Justice and Education (Hon. R.C. Baker) a request from the residents of Yanyarrie that a new school should be provided because ‘the building in which it is now carried on is most unsuitable. One of the settlers is willing to give a piece of land on section 168 for a site".

The main town of the hundred is Carrieton, South Australia which was established 1877, beyond Goyder Line.

== See also ==
- Lands administrative divisions of South Australia
