= Bruce, South Australia =

Bruce South Australia
- Coordinates: 32°27′48″S 138°11′51″E
- Population: 17 (SAL 2021)
- Established: 1881 (town); 1997 (locality)
- Postcode(s): 5433
- Elevation: 239 m (784 ft)
- Time zone: ACST (UTC+9:30)
  - Summer (DST): ACST (UTC+10:30)
- Location: 278 km (173 mi) N of Adelaide; 40 km (25 mi) N of Melrose; 19 km (12 mi) SE of Quorn
- LGA(s): District Council of Mount Remarkable; Flinders Ranges Council
- Region: Yorke and Mid North
- County: Frome
- State electorate(s): Stuart
- Federal division(s): Grey
Mean max temp	Mean min temp	Annual rainfall
24.7 °C; 76 °F	13.6 °C; 56 °F	269.7 mm 10.6 in
Localities around Bruce:
Quorn	Stephenston	Stephenston
Quorn; Wilmington	Bruce	Hammond
Wilmington	Wilmington	Hammond
- Footnotes: Adjoining localities

Bruce is a town and a locality in the Australian state of South Australia located about 278 kilometres (173 mi) north of the state capital of Adelaide.

The Town of Bruce was surveyed in February 1881 on land in the cadastral unit of the Hundred of Willochra. It was proclaimed on 19 May 1881. Its name is reported in one source as being named after a "well known landowner in the district" while another source suggests that it was named by the Governor of South Australia after one of his family or friends. It was the site of a railway station on the Peterborough–Quorn railway line which operated from 1882 to 1987. A post office operated from 1882 to 1976 and a school operated from 1882 to 1962. Boundaries for the locality were proclaimed on 13 March 1997 and was named after the town whose site is located within its boundaries.

The 2016 Australian census which was conducted in August 2016 reports that Bruce had a population of eight people.

Bruce is located within the federal division of Grey and the state electoral district of Stuart, and with most of its extent being within the local government area of the District Council of Mount Remarkable and the remainder being within the Flinders Ranges Council.
