= Willochra, South Australia =

Willochra South Australia
- Coordinates: 32.227331°S 138.138967°E
- Population: 12 (SAL 2021)
- Established: 1860
- Postcode(s): 5433
- Location: 18 km (11 mi) NE of Quorn, South Australia
- LGA(s): Flinders Ranges Council
- State electorate(s): Electoral district of Stuart
- Federal division(s): Division of Grey

Willochra is a rural locality and former town in the Flinders Ranges of South Australia, surveyed in 1860. It is at the heart of Willochra Plain which stretches approximately from Melrose to the Willochra locality, some distance northeast of Quorn, and is bisected by the Willochra Creek. The creek overflows across the plain within the locality of Willochra, being known as the 'Overflow of Willochra Creek'.
