= Carrieton =

- Town
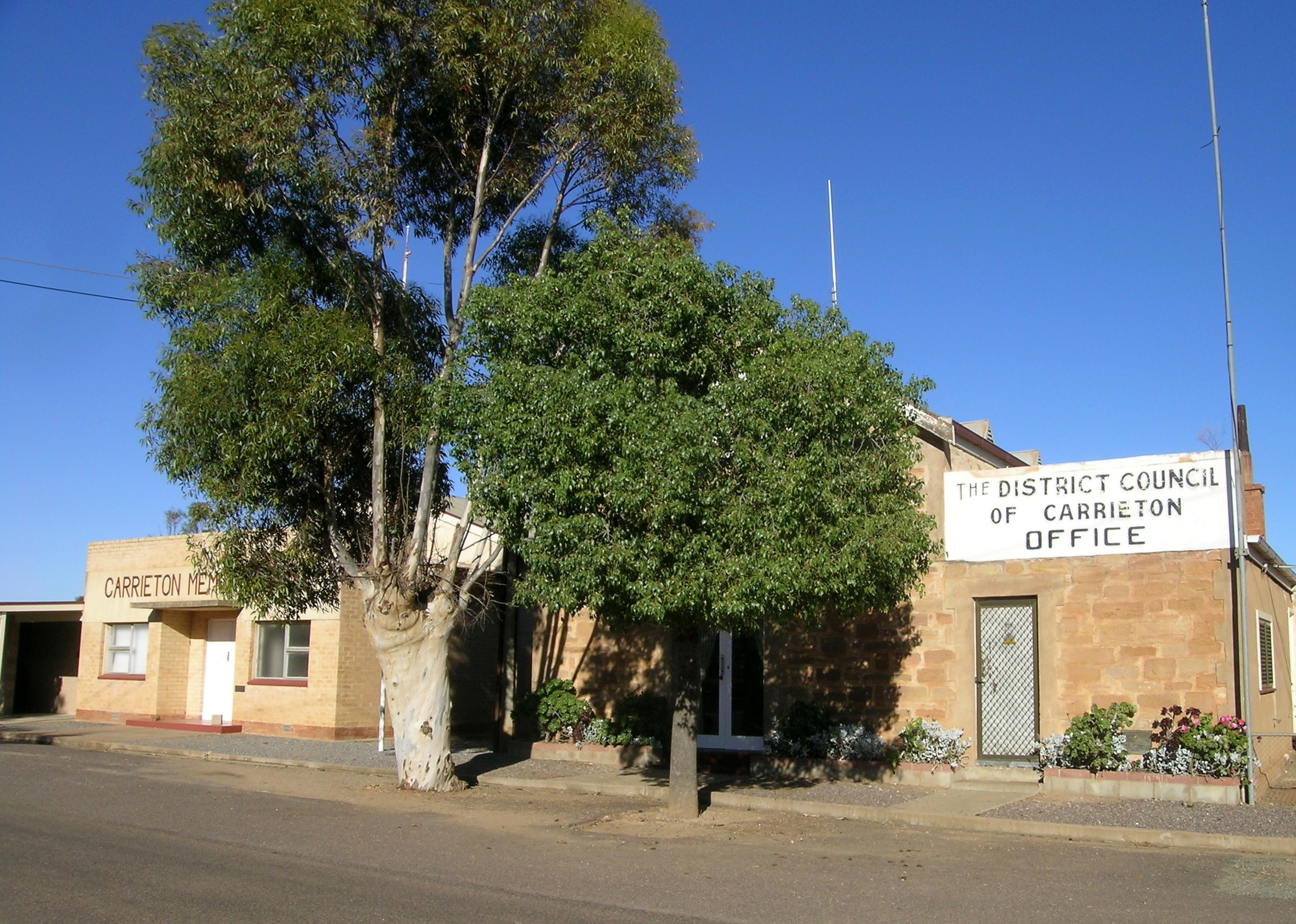
- Carrieton Memorial hall and council office.

- Coordinates: 32°25′34″S 138°31′44″E
- Country: Australia
- State: South Australia
- Region: Yorke and Mid North
- LGA: District Council of Orroroo Carrieton
- Location: 327.8 km (203.7 mi) N of Adelaide
- Established: 10 April 1879 (town); 16 December 1999 (locality)

Government
  - State electorate: Stuart
  - Federal division: Grey
- Elevation: 440 m (1,440 ft)

Population
  - Total: 51 (SAL 2016)
- Time zone: UTC+9:30 (ACST)
  - Summer (DST): UTC+10:30 (ACST)
- Postcode: 5432
- County: Dalhousie
- Mean max temp: 25.2 °C (77.4 °F)
- Mean min temp: 10.6 °C (51.1 °F)
- Annual rainfall: 308.6 mm (12.15 in)
Localities around Carrieton
Moockra	Yanyarrie	Belton
Moockra	Carrieton	Belton; Johnburgh
Moockra	Eurelia	Eurelia

Carrieton is a small town situated in the Flinders Ranges of South Australia. It is located between the towns of Orroroo to the south and Cradock to the north.

Originally opened in 1877 as Yanyarrie Whim, (Yanyarrie in the local indigenous dialect is the word for "eagle feathers") with the construction of a post office, the settlement was renamed in 1888 as Carrieton, after the daughter of Governor Jervois, Lucy Caroline.

== Railways ==
The town was on the Peterborough–Quorn railway line which opened in December 1881, served by a Class 1 station. A large goods shed and fettler's cottage were also constructed.

Passenger services were discontinued during 1969, when the South Australian Railways withdrew the railcar service.

Declining rail traffic saw the gradual withdrawal of services on the railway, with the last station master being withdrawn on 1 July 1971. The railway was closed in 1981 and removed in 1986.

== Colonial history ==
Carrieton acquired a school (1882), a police station (1884), St Raphael's Roman Catholic Church (the large presbytery was built in 1889), a small Methodist Church (1882), an Anglican Church (1888) and the railway station, built in 1885 at a cost of £1,500.

== Recent history ==
The road was renamed the RM Williams Way in recognition of the area where R. M. Williams had many associations. Carrieton is often referred to as 'Gum Greek' country. The town is serviced through a community general store, hotel, post office, and accommodation, and it is a part of the District Council of Orroroo Carrieton.

Recently, after large downpours in January 2020, many of the creeks surrounding Carrieton were demolished. The bridge over Yanyarrie Creek 10 km north of Carrieton was especially damaged as huge slates of bitumen disappeared down the creek. Yanyarrie creek has since been repaired with a detour, after the first detour was ruined again by another flash flood a few weeks after the first one.

== Carrieton Rodeo ==
Carrieton is home to the Carrieton Rodeo, an Australian Professional Rodeos Association event, held every year on Proclamation Day. It held its 60th anniversary meet on 28 December 2012.
