= Quorn, South Australia =

Quorn
- Town
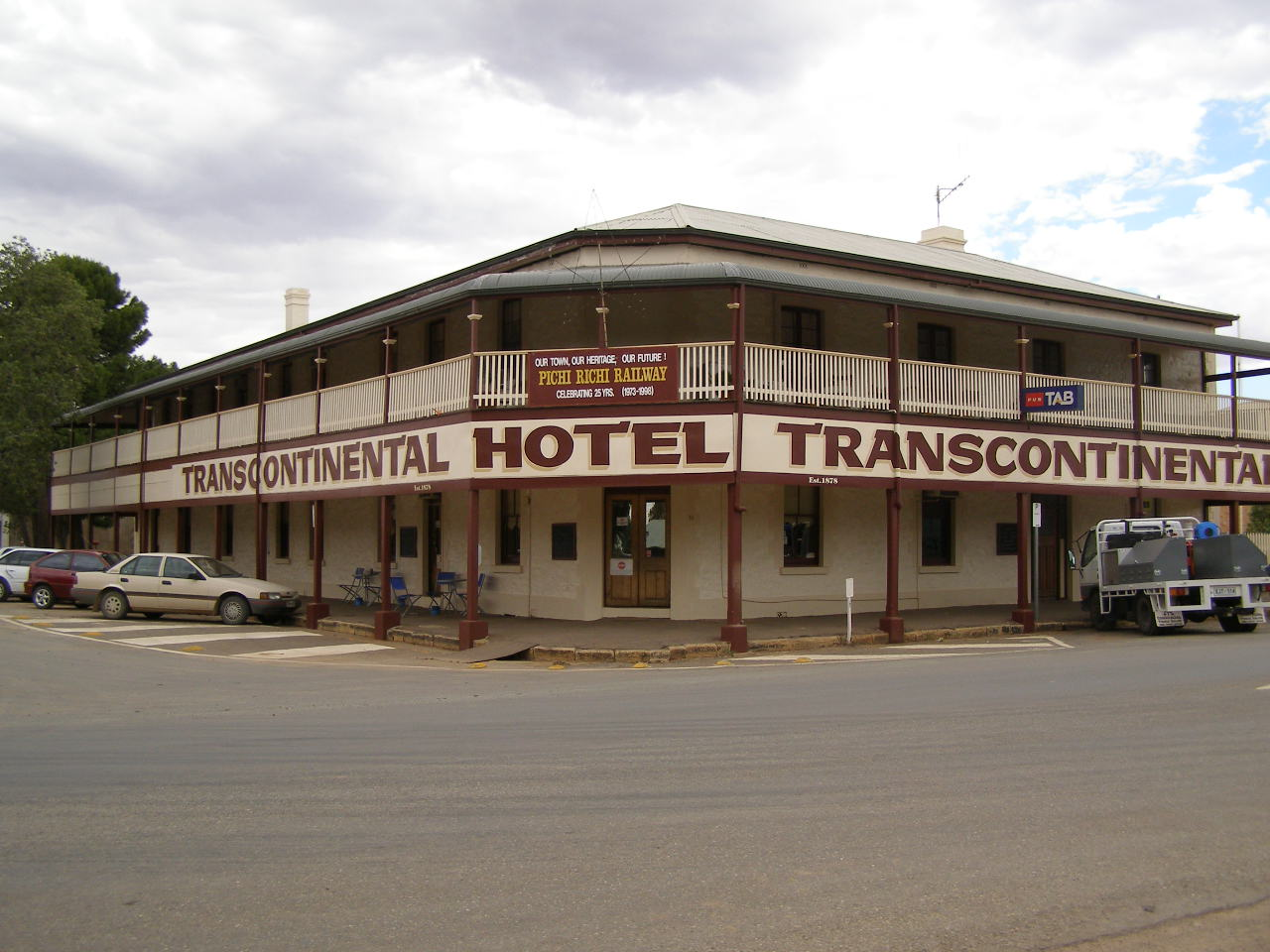
- The Transcontinental Hotel

- Coordinates: 32°20′58″S 138°02′26″E
- Country: Australia
- State: South Australia
- Region: Far North
- LGA: Flinders Ranges Council
- Established: 16 May 1878 (town); 25 November 1999 (locality)

Government
  - State electorate: Giles
  - Federal division: Grey
- Elevation (Railway Station): 293 m (961 ft)

Population
  - Total: 1,150 (UCL 2021)
- Time zone: UTC+9:30 (ACST)
  - Summer (DST): UTC+10:30 (ACST)
- Postcode: 5433
- County: Frome; Newcastle
- Mean max temp: 24.7 °C (76.5 °F)
- Mean min temp: 13.6 °C (56.5 °F)
- Annual rainfall: 257.0 mm (10.12 in)
Localities around Quorn
| | Yarrah | Willochra |
| | Quorn | Stephenston |
| Saltia | Wilmington | Bruce |

Quorn is a small town in the Flinders Ranges region in northern South Australia, 39 kilometres (24 mi) northeast of Port Augusta. Platted in 1878, the town lies within the Flinders Ranges Council local government area, the state electoral district of Giles and the federal Division of Grey. It was a railway town for much of its history, but the relocation of railway traffic caused its decline after World War II. With its picturesque setting and heritage-listed buildings, the town is known for tourism and as a filming location, as well as being the terminus of the Pichi Richi Railway.

== History ==
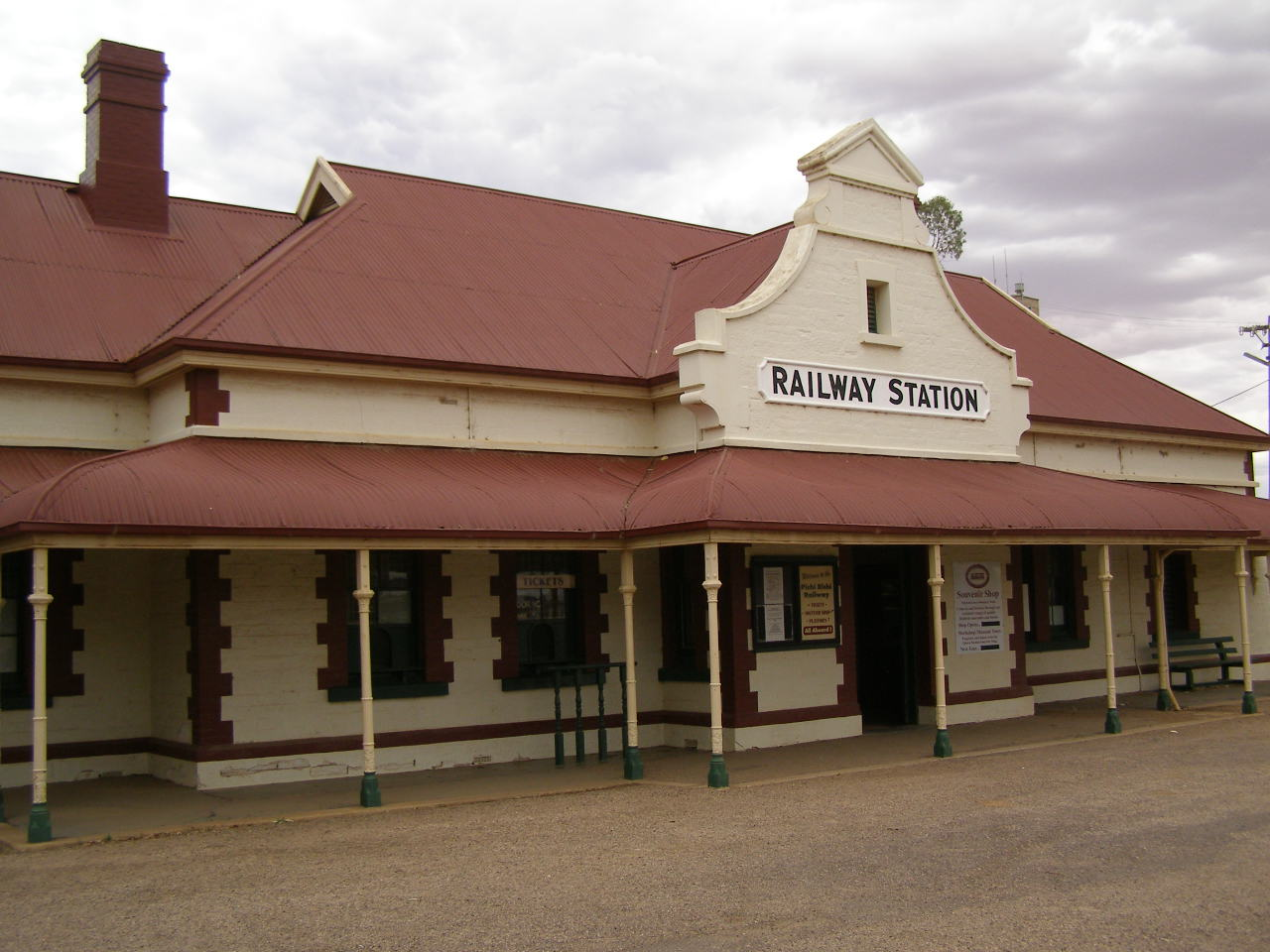
Quorn railway station

Quorn lies on the traditional lands of the Nukunu people, close to the border with Barngarla lands to the north.

In 1878, after the British colonisation of South Australia, the town was surveyed by Godfrey Walsh as part of the preparations for building the railway line from Port Augusta northwards. It was named by Mr J.H.B. Warner whose family lived in Quorn, Leicestershire, in England. At the time, he was employed as private secretary to the Governor of South Australia, Sir William Jervois.

=== Quorn's railways ===
The 1067 mm gauge railway line from Port Augusta to Quorn opened in 1879 and was subsequently extended north to Government Gums (Farina) in 1882, Marree in 1884, Oodnadatta in 1890 and Alice Springs in 1929. This railway line later became known as the Great Northern Railway and later the Central Australia Railway.

Quorn's rail links south and east started in 1882 when the Peterborough–Quorn railway line was opened. Peterborough had already been connected by rail to Adelaide in the south in 1881. Adelaide was connected by rail to Melbourne, though with breaks of gauge, in 1897.

In 1917 the standard gauge Trans-Australian Railway was completed between Port Augusta and Kalgoorlie; the latter was already connected via break of gauge to Perth. This meant that Quorn was on a transcontinental east–west rail corridor, though with breaks of gauge, as well as a line from Adelaide to Oodnadatta, later extended to Alice Springs, in central Australia. Rail traffic increased when the Peterborough–Broken Hill was connected via break of gauge to Sydney in 1927. These east–west and north–south corridors through Quorn made it an important town. As a result, many fine buildings were built as the town expanded.

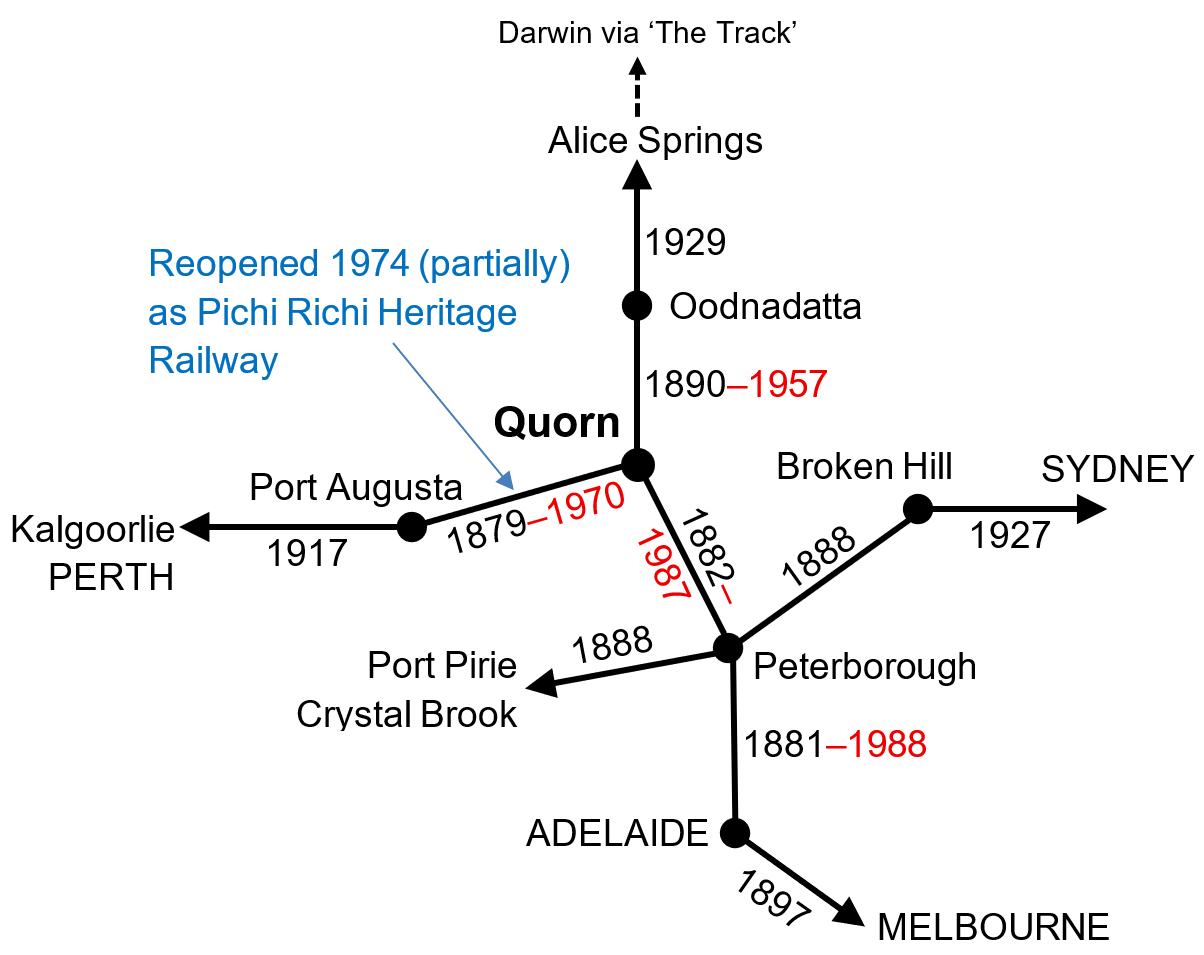
Rail links of Quorn, South Australia. Railway opening dates are shown in black and closure dates in red. Quorn was on the east-west transcontinental route until the direct Adelaide–Port Augusta line was completed in 1937. It was also on the north–south transcontinental route until a new alignment of the Central Australia Railway by-passed it in 1957. Not to scale, directions are approximate, other South Australian lines not shown.

Quorn lost its role as a crossroads when a standard-gauge railway connection was opened between Port Pirie Junction and Port Augusta in 1937, meaning east–west rail traffic bypassed Quorn. However, during World War II, Quorn was a vital service point for trains heading north to Alice Springs, carrying over 1,000,000 troops heading to Darwin and on to Papua New Guinea. Train services through Quorn peaked at over 50 per day during and immediately after the period of World War II. Services during this time also carried coal from Leigh Creek to the newly-opened Playford A Power Station in Port Augusta.

During the 1950s a new standard gauge line was built on the western side of The Dutchmans Stern, Mount Arden and Mount Eyre, from Stirling North to Brachina and then roughly following the original narrow gauge route through Leigh Creek and to Marree, thus bypassing Quorn. This bypass took away the last railway traffic through the Pichi Richi Pass, and the last major freight traffic through Quorn. The only services left operating through Quorn were freight between Peterborough and Hawker. As a result, Quorn's importance diminished and eventually in 1980s the railway was completely closed as the last freight was moved to road transport. One unusual aspect of the railway working from Peterborough to Quorn and then on to Hawker was the need for the engine to be turned and attached to the opposite end of the train when arriving at Quorn, as it was not a "through" station for the trip from Peterborough to Hawker.

In 1973, a group of railway enthusiasts formed the Pichi Richi Railway Preservation Society to preserve the bridges and stonework of the railway through the Pichi Richi Pass between Quorn and Stirling North. Although the intention was to just preserve the railway through the Pichi Richi Pass, they later acquired operable railway rollingstock and locomotives and today provide a tourist railway service through the Pichi Richi Pass from Quorn to Port Augusta. There is at least one book by preservationists showing the line in its heyday.

=== Colebrook Home ===
Colebrook Home was an institution for Australian Aboriginal children run by the United Aborigines Mission from 1924 to 1981, which was named Colebrook Home in 1927 when it moved to a place called Colebrook, just outside Quorn. It remained there until 1944, when it was moved to Eden Hills, just outside Adelaide. The Colebrook site at Quorn is now a small Aboriginal community. Past residents of Colebrook Home include Doreen Kartinyeri, Lowitja O'Donoghue, and Faith Thomas.

== Tourism ==
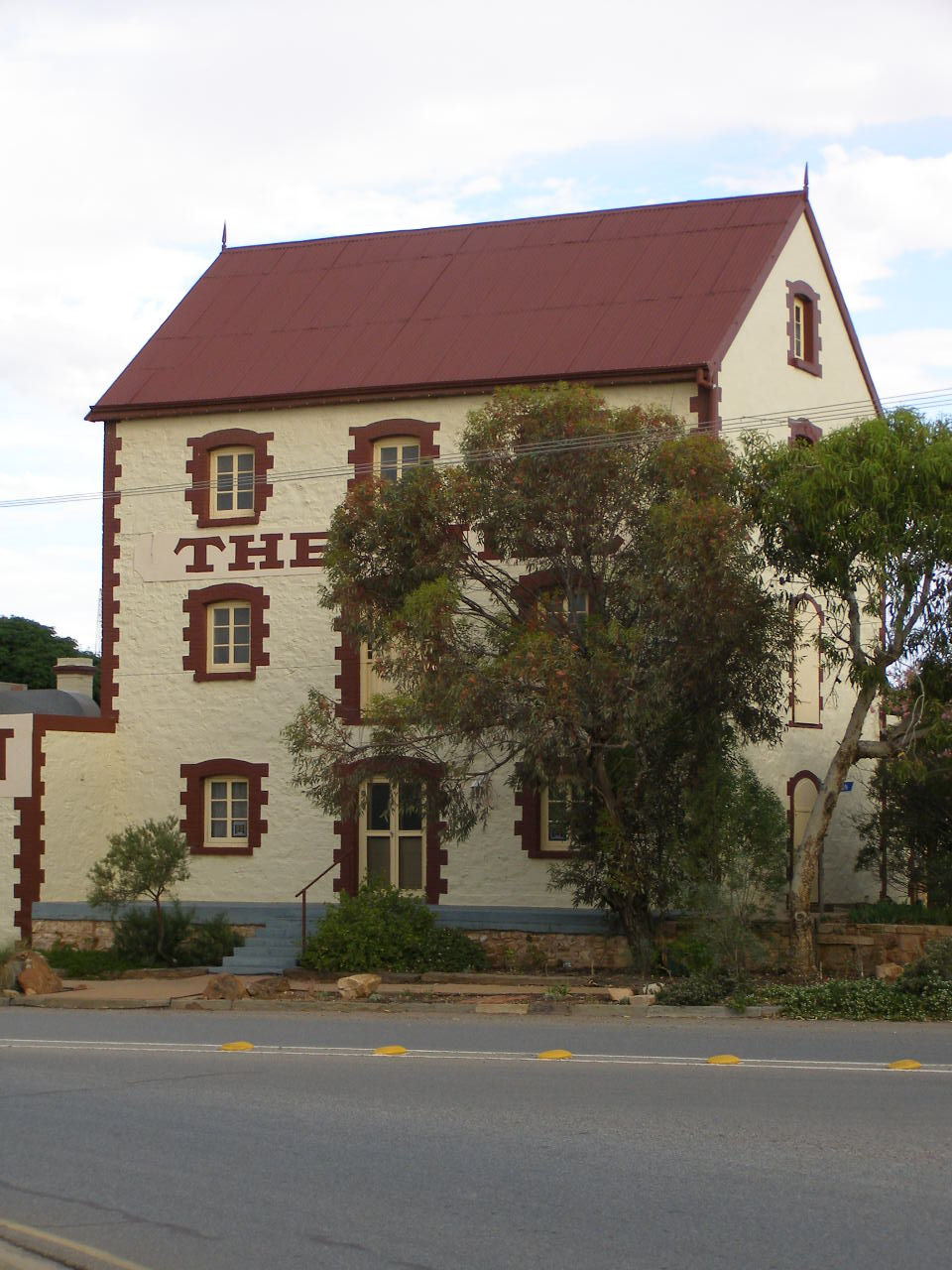
The Old Mill

A main attraction in Quorn is Flinders Gin Distillery and the Pichi Richi Railway. There are also self-guided walking tours in the town, including several based around the town's historic old buildings, the railway yards and other historic locations. There are a number of hotels, takeaways and cafés in town.

In mid-2020 The Flinders Ranges Council installed signage outside the historic buildings for historic and tourist information. The Flinders Ranges Visitor Information Centre / Pichi Richi Railway in the Quorn railway station has a museum, and provides visitor information including workshop tours, bookings for travel on the railway, accommodation information, heritage self-guided walking maps and souvenirs.

The Heysen Trail and the Mawson Trail, a pair of long-distance trails dedicated respectively to walking and cycling, pass through town and there are many bushwalks and four-wheel drive tracks.

Quorn is a stopover for many travellers coming from Adelaide to explore the Flinders Ranges. The tourist office is in the Quorn Railway Station provides free information, maps and trails to safely see the best sites in the Flinders, including Warren Gorge, Kanyaka Station, Proby's Grave and Itali Itali.

The grain silos in the Quorn railway yards are viewing area for a nightly film showing the local history or Quorn and surrounds and on display every evening after dark. This is an open-air and free event.

Quorn has also been the location for several popular films, including The Shiralee, Sunday Too Far Away, Gallipoli, Wolf Creek, The Sundowners, The Lighthorsemen and The Last Ride starring Hugo Weaving. In 2014 Russell Crowe directed The Water Diviner, using the Pichi Richi Railway for the railway scenes.

== Notable people ==
- Jedd Hughes, country music artist
- Brian Harradine, politician
- Anne Haddy, actress
- Fos Williams, SANFL footballer
- Gwendolyne Stevens, nurse, farmer and discoverer of a uranium deposit
- Lowitja O'Donoghue, former Australian of the Year
- James Burgess, trade unionist

== Heritage listings ==
Quorn has a number of heritage-listed sites, including:

- Arden Vale Road: Mt Arden Station
- 37 First Street: Savings Bank of South Australia
- 45-47 First Street: Foster's Store
- Quorn-Port Augusta Road: Woolshed Flat Railway Bridge
- Railway Terrace: Catholic Church of the Immaculate Conception
- Railway Terrace: Quorn railway station
- 20 (Rear) Railway Terrace: Quorn Institute
- 2 Railway Terrace: Dunn's Flour Mill
- 6 Railway Terrace: Bank of Adelaide
- 11 Railway Terrace: National Bank
- 14-15 Railway Terrace: Transcontinental Hotel
- 16 Railway Terrace: Austral Hotel
- 17 Railway Terrace: Bruse's Hall
- 18 Railway Terrace: Criterion Hotel
- 19 Railway Terrace: Quorn Courthouse
- 20 Railway Terrace: Quorn Town Hall
- 25 Railway Terrace: Grand Junction Hotel
- 15 Seventh Street: St Matthew's Anglican Church

== Gallery ==
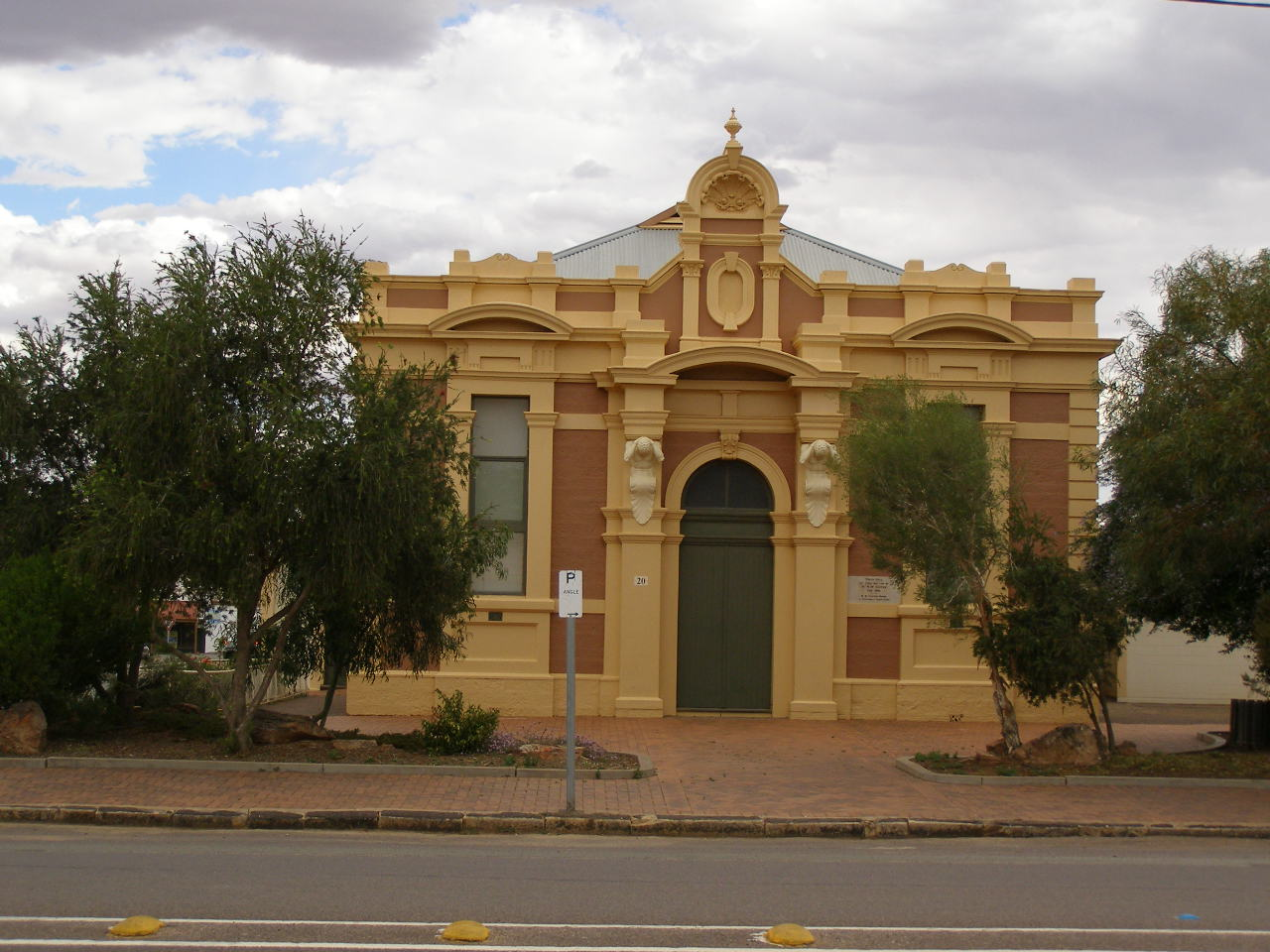
Quorn Town Hall

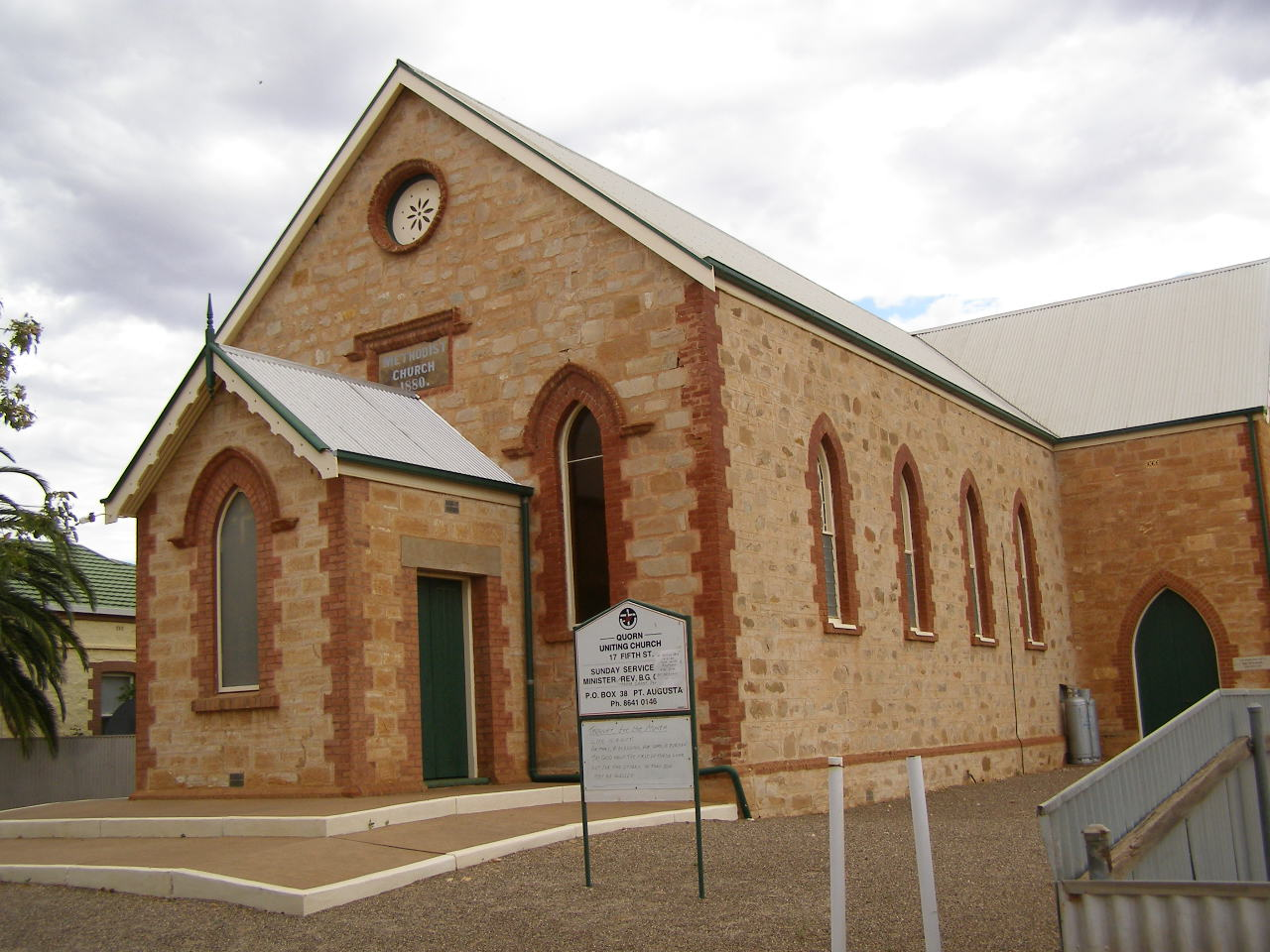
Methodist Church (now Uniting Church), Quorn

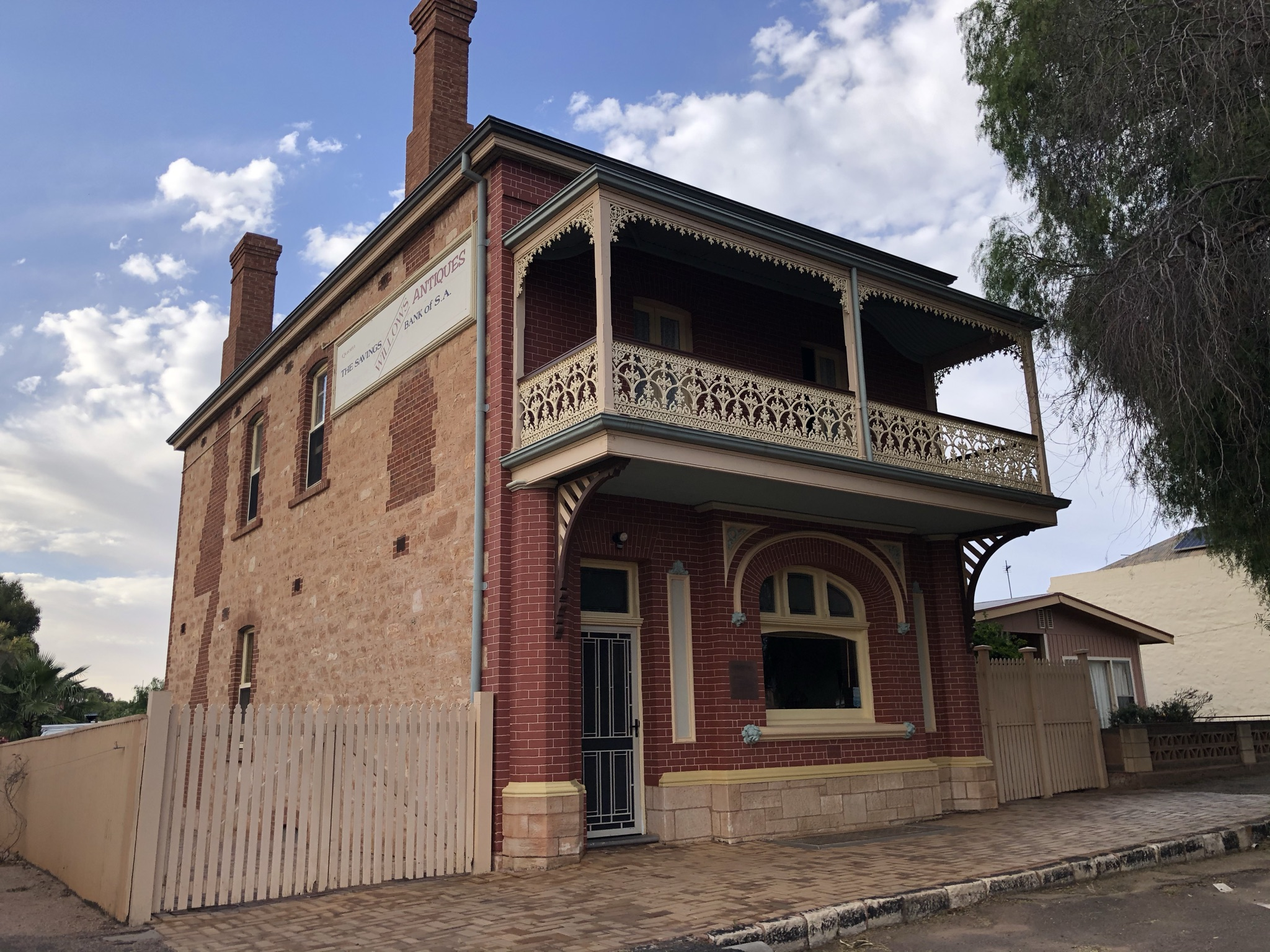
Built in the 1890s as a saddlery, it then became the Savings Bank of SA

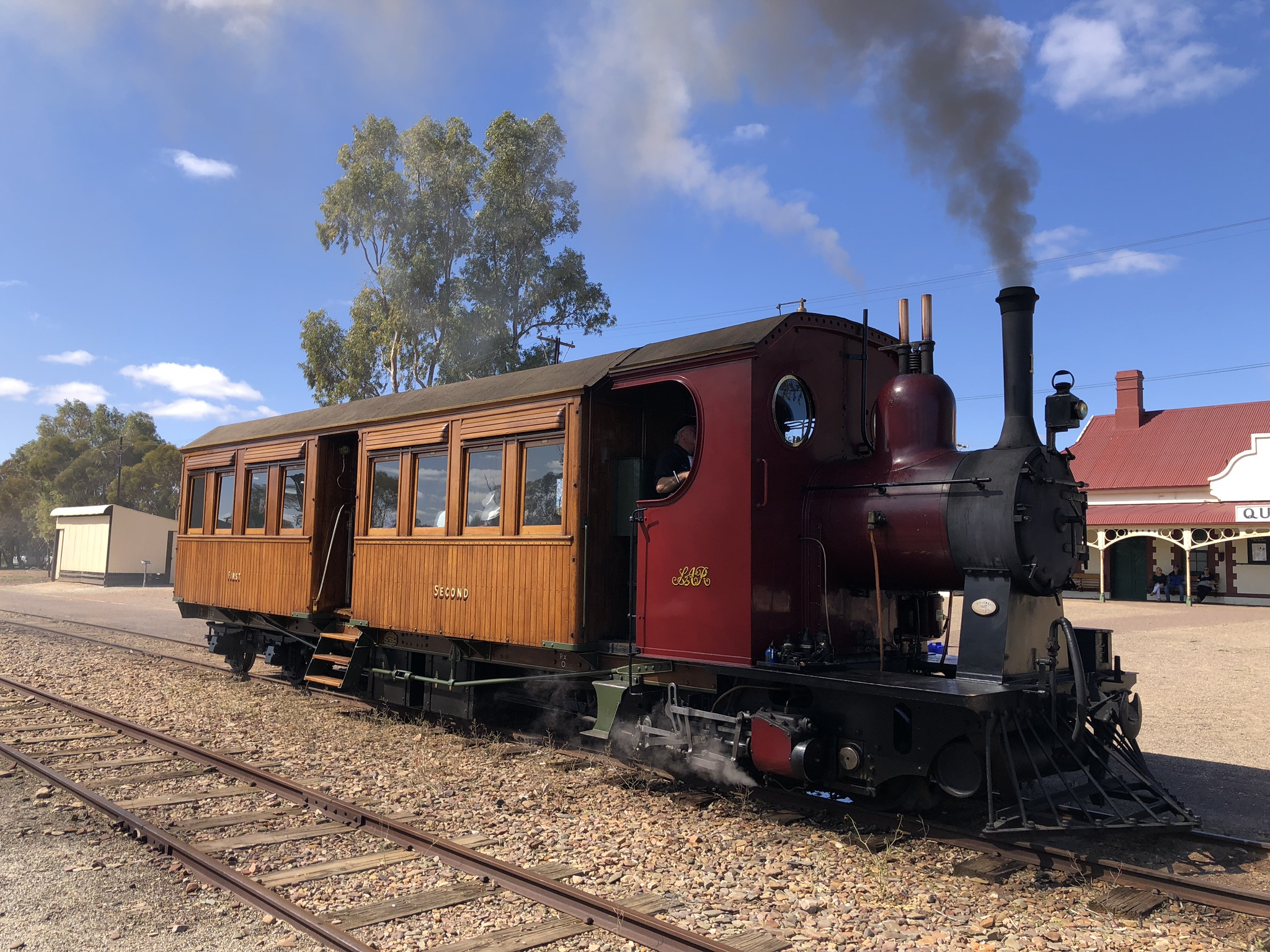
The Coffee Pot

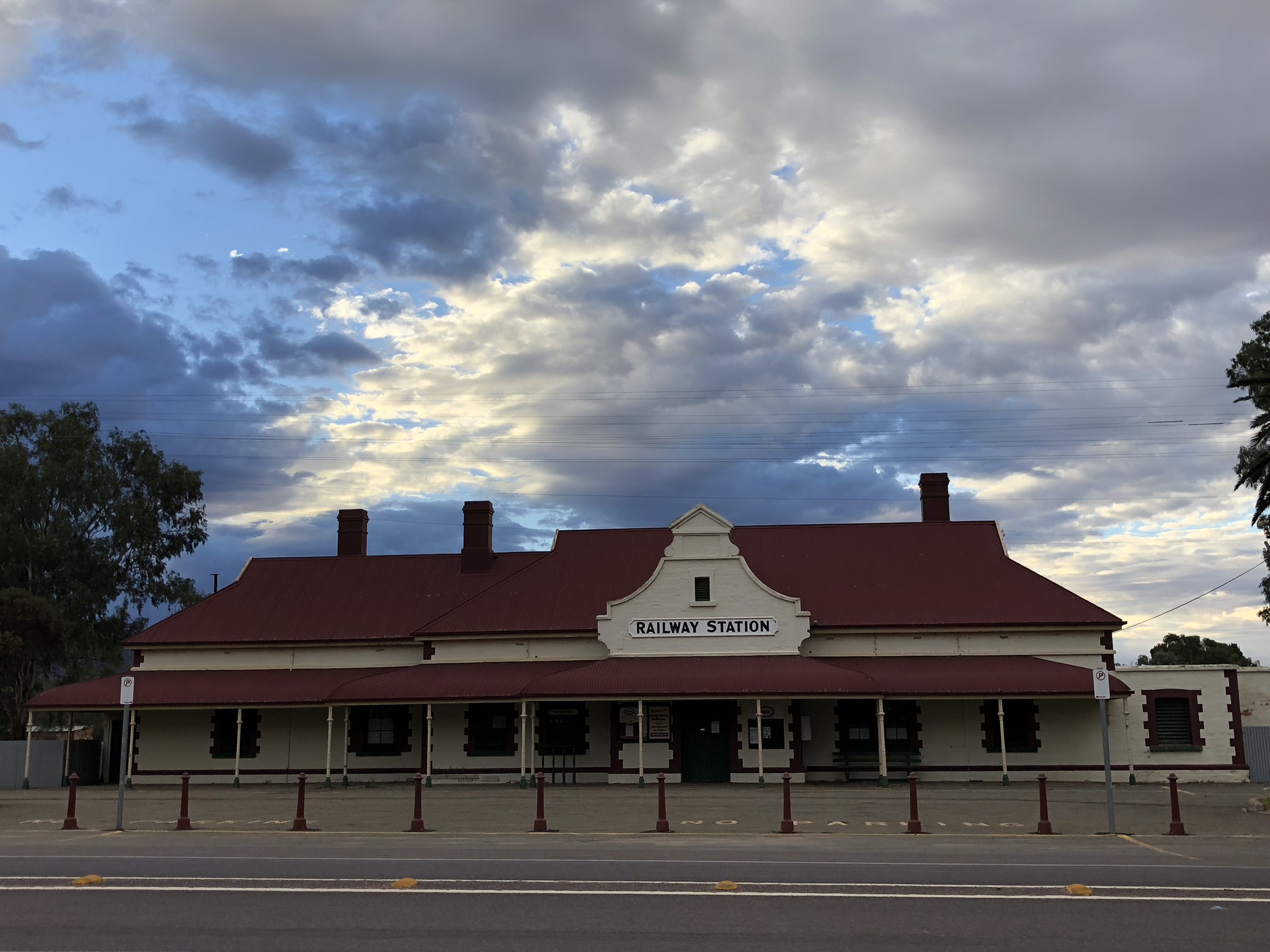
Quorn Railway Station
