= Cradock, South Australia =

Cradock
- Town
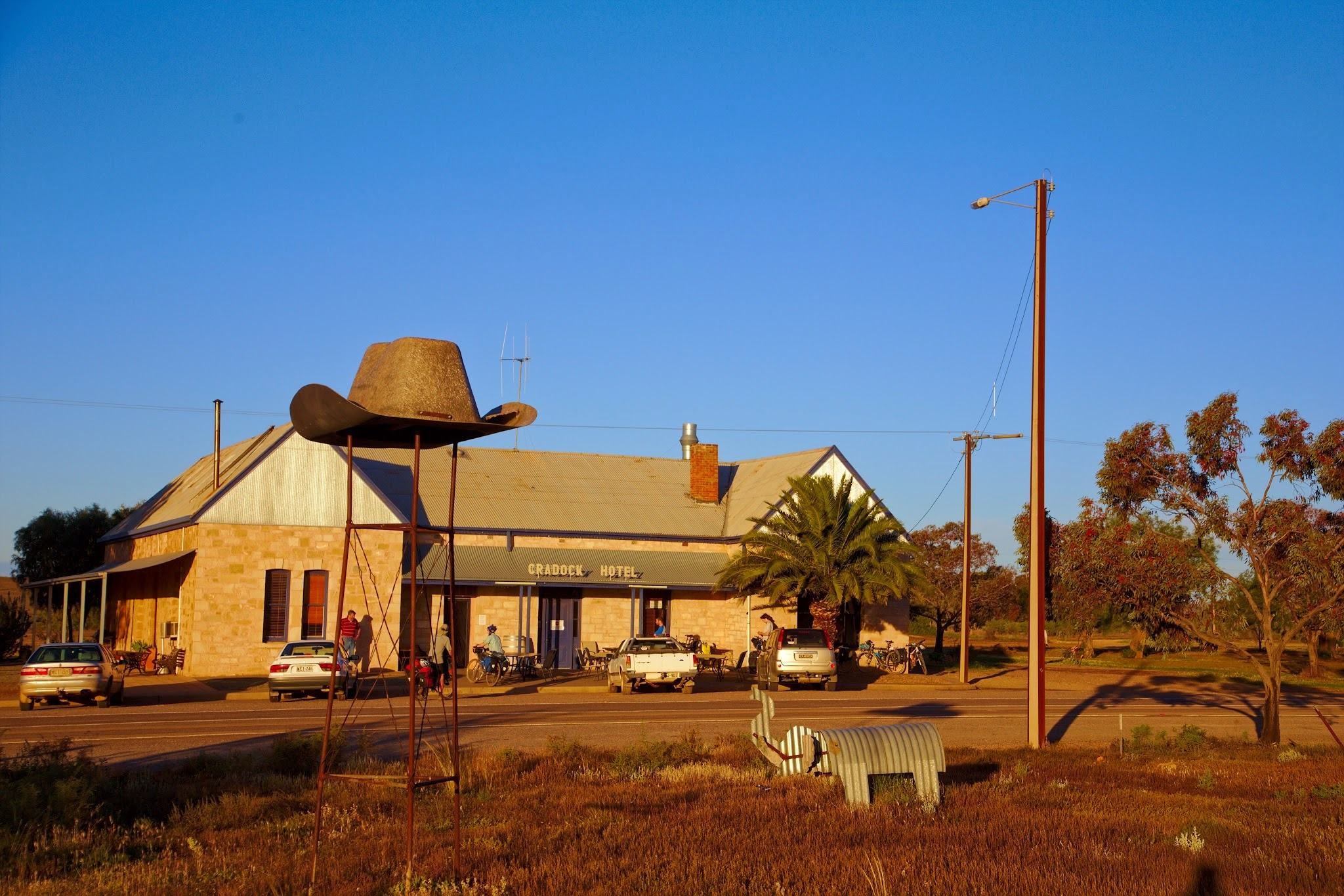
- The Cradock Hotel

- Coordinates: 32°04′21″S 138°29′34″E
- Country: Australia
- State: South Australia
- Region: Far North
- LGAs: Flinders Ranges Council; District Council of Orroroo Carrieton
- Location: 320 km (200 mi) N of Adelaide
- Established: 6 March 1879 (town); 25 November 1999 (locality)

Government
  - State electorate: Stuart
  - Federal division: Grey
- Elevation: 410 m (1,350 ft)

Population
  - Total: 44 (SAL 2021)
- Time zone: UTC+9:30 (ACST)
  - Summer (DST): UTC+10:30 (ACST)
- Postcode: 5432
- County: Granville
- Mean max temp: 25.3 °C (77.5 °F)
- Mean min temp: 10.7 °C (51.3 °F)
- Annual rainfall: 307.2 mm (12.09 in)
Localities around Cradock
Hawker	Hawker; Worumba	Holowiliena South; Three Creeks
Kanyaka	Cradock	Wilcowie; Belton
Moockra	Yanyarrie	Belton

Cradock is a town and locality in the Australian state of South Australia 320 kilometres north of the state capital of Adelaide on the RM Williams Way . The nearest town with a greater population is Hawker which is approximately 20 km away with a population of around 360. Cradock is in the Flinders Ranges Council area, the state Electoral district of Stuart and the federal Division of Grey.

The town was surveyed during November 1878 and proclaimed on 6 March 1879. The locality's boundaries were gazetted on 25 November 1999 and include the Government Town of Cradock and the sites of the ceased Government Towns of Charlcome and Herbert.

After the South Australian government permitted settlers to go into the semi-arid lands north of Goyder's Line Cradock was established in 1879 on a 'grassy flat' of 'strong red loam', by the Wirreanda Creek. Cradock takes its name from the then Governor of South Africa, Sir John Cradock.

Soon after settlement, a school, police station, two hotels, two blacksmith shops and a saddler were operating in Cradock. The "wheat rush" was followed by the failure of four years of crops which led to an increasing despair and a loss of many of the town's population.

== Historic buildings ==
Cradock had three churches. The stone Catholic church opened in 1883. The Wesleyan Methodist church built in 1884 was weatherboard and iron, replaced by a stone church (construction started in 1924) which was used into the 1980s, but is now a private residence. The stone Anglican church built in 1894 was used until 1958 and is also now a private residence.

The historic former St Gabriel's Catholic Church designed by Thomas Burgoyne in Main Street is listed on the South Australian Heritage Register.

The town still has one hotel, the Cradock Hotel, known in earlier days as the Heartbreak Hotel.
