= Wallerberdina, South Australia =

Wallerberdina
- Suburb
- Coordinates: 31°51′19″S 138°00′23″E
- Country: Australia
- State: South Australia
- Region: Far North
- LGA: Pastoral Unincorporated Area
- Location: 345 km (214 mi) N of Adelaide; 40 km (25 mi) W of Hawker
- Established: 26 April 2013

Government
  - State electorate: Giles
  - Federal division: Grey

Population
  - Total: 0 (shared with adjoining localities) (2016 census) (Note: For the 2016 census, the State Suburb of Wallerberdina consisted of the localities of Wallerberdina and Yadlamalka, and part of the northern end of Yarrah.)
- Time zone: UTC+9:30 (ACST)
  - Summer (DST): UTC+10:30 (ACST)
- Postcode: 5713
- County: Blachford
- {{{blank_name_sec2}}}: 25.3 °C (77.5 °F)
- {{{blank1_name_sec2}}}: 10.7 °C (51.3 °F)
- {{{blank2_name_sec2}}}: 307.2 mm (12.09 in)
Suburbs around Wallerberdina
| Lake Torrens Station | Lake Torrens Station | Flinders Ranges |
| Yadlamalka | Wallerberdina | Barndioota |
| Yadlamalka | Yadlamalka; Yarrah | Kanyaka |

Wallerberdina is a locality in the Australian state of South Australia located about 345 kilometres (214 mi) north of the state capital of Adelaide and about 40 kilometres (25 mi) west of the town of Hawker.

It is located on the plain between Lake Torrens in the west and the Flinders Ranges in the east. Its boundaries approximate those of the cadastral unit of the Hundred of Warrakimbo.

The traditional owners of the area are the Banggarla peoples.

The 2016 Australian census which was conducted in August 2016 reports that Wallerberdina and two adjoining localities had no people living within the boundaries of the geographic classification known as the State Suburb of Wallerberdina.

Wallerberdina is located within the federal division of Grey, the state electoral district of Giles, the Pastoral Unincorporated Area of South Australia and the state government region of the Far North. Plans to build a nuclear waste dump in the area were defeated in 2019 following community opposition.

== Mount Eyre ==
The site of the government town of Mount Eyre (31°55′05″S 138°01′29″E) is located at the south end of the locality on the north-west side of the route of the Marree railway line. It was surveyed during January 1863 and the land sale began on 14 May 1863. Its name is derived from Mount Eyre which was "the northernmost point of Eyre's 1839 expedition and named by Governor Gawler on 11 July 1839."
