= 1917 Newcastle state by-election =

The 1917 Newcastle state by-election was a by-election held on 12 May 1917 for the South Australian House of Assembly seat of Newcastle.

The by-election was triggered by the resignation of first-term Labor MP Thomas Butterfield on 21 March to contest a seat in the Australian Senate at the 1917 federal election. There were only two candidates Port Augusta labourer William Harvey for the Labor Party, and Quorn farmer and grazier Edward Twopeny for the Liberal Union. Twopeny, who had unsuccessfully contested the seat twice previously, won the seat.

The largest booths were at Quorn (580 votes), Port Augusta (572 votes), Wilmington (177 votes) and Hawker (175 votes). There were also booths at Beltana, Belton, Blinman, Boolcunda East, Bruce, Carrieton, Cockburn, Cordillo Downs, Cradock, Edeowie, Eurelia, Farina, Gordon, Hammond, Hookina, Johnburg, Leigh Creek, Limestone Well, Lyndhurst Siding, Marree, Mount Lyndhurst, Mungeranie, Murnpeowie, Olary, Oodnadatta, Parachilna, Port Augusta West, Saltia, Stirling North, Warcowie, Waukaringa, William Creek, Willipa, Wilson, Wooltana, Wyacca and Yanyarrie.

The election saw a drastic drop in turnout, which was down more than 25% from the 1915 state election. This was attributed by both candidates to major problems with the electoral roll. Twopeny criticised the "disgraceful state of the electoral roll", stating that the rolls "could not be in a worse condition" and expressing concern about voters being disenfranchised for being "too late" to be counted, while others who were present on the roll were dead or had left the state. He hoped there would soon be "clean rolls". Harvey stated that "had the rolls been in good order Labor would have won" and claimed that 200 Labor voters in Port Augusta had been refused a vote, but stated he was "pleased with the way Mr Twopeny had run the campaign". The Register in Adelaide reported that there had been "great indignation" about the state of the rolls, with voters who "had their cards and transfer notices" not being on the certified roll. The newspaper also noted that the time at which the polls closed and the location of the polling booth in Port Augusta differed from that at the Commonwealth elections one week prior.

Butterworth lost the Senate race at the federal election, reclaimed his Newcastle seat at the 1918 state election and would go on to be a senior minister in state Labor governments during the 1920s.

== Results ==
Newcastle state by-election, 12 May 1917
Party	Candidate	Votes	%	±%
Liberal Union	Edward Twopeny	1,533	53.6	
Labor	William Harvey	1,326	46.4	
Total formal votes		2,862	99.4	+1.0
Informal votes		17	0.6	−1.0
Turnout		2,879	46.9	−25.8
Liberal Union gain from Labor		Swing	N/A	

== See also ==
- List of South Australian state by-elections
