= Yadlamalka =

- Suburb
- Coordinates: 31°56′21″S 137°51′00″E
- Country: Australia
- State: South Australia
- Region: Far North
- LGA: Pastoral Unincorporated Area
- Location: 60 km (37 mi) N of Port Augusta
- Established: 26 April 2013

Government
  - State electorate: Giles
  - Federal division: Grey
- County: Blachford
Suburbs around Yadlamalka
Lake Torrens	Lake Torrens Station	Flinders Ranges
Lake Torrens; South Gap; Kootaberra	Yadlamalka	Wallerberdina; Yarrah
Kootaberra	Wilkatana Station; Yarrah	Yarrah

Yadlamalka is a rural locality in the Far North region of South Australia. Yadlamalka lies at the southern tip of Lake Torrens within the Pastoral Unincorporated Area, 60 kilometres north of Port Augusta.

The area is an arid plain between the Flinders Ranges and Lake Torrens, and exhibits some salt flats.
