= County of Blachford =

Blachford
- Cadastral division
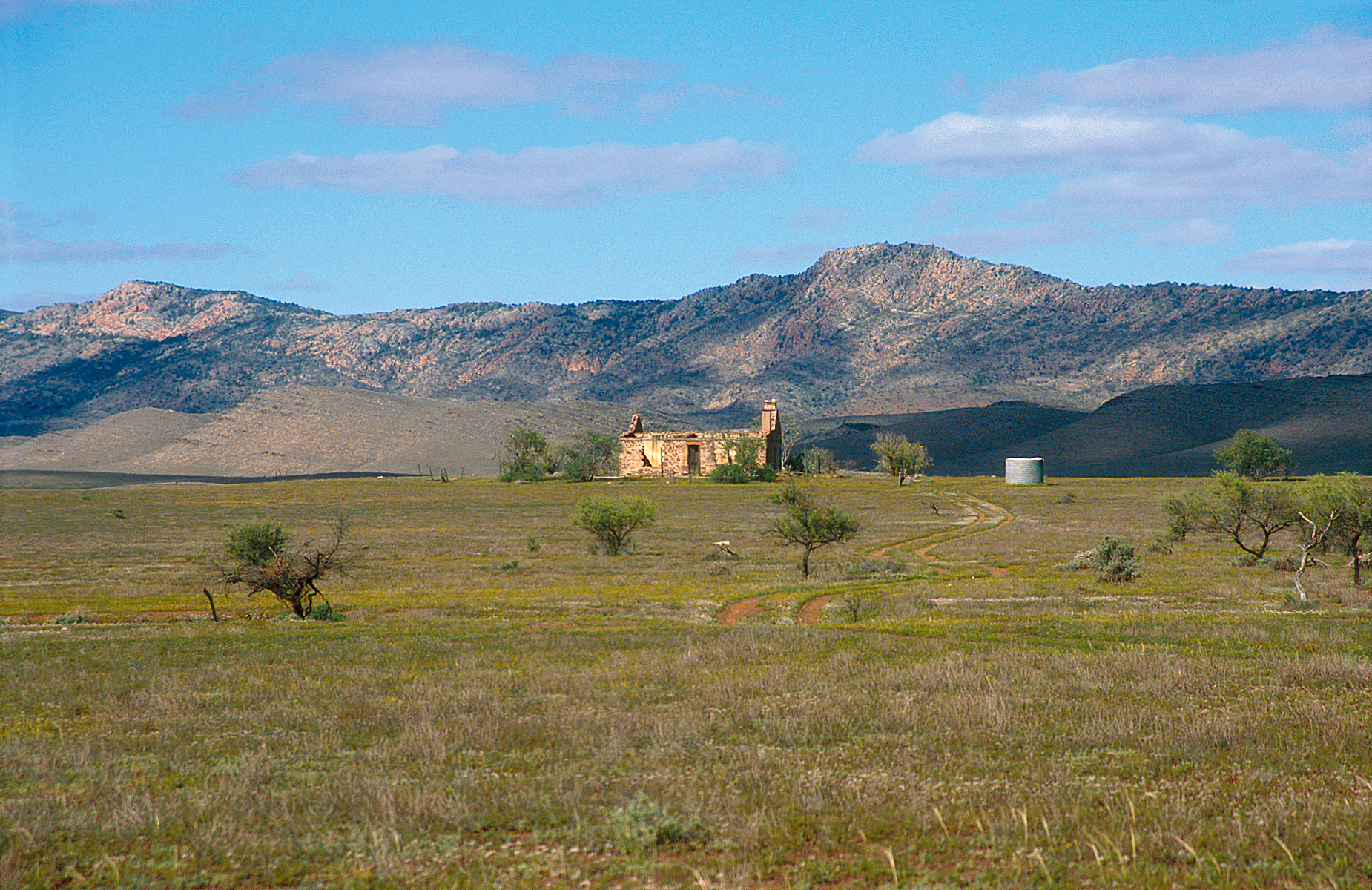
- Abandoned homestead north of Hawker on the western edge of the Flinders Ranges

- Coordinates: 31°44′41″S 138°07′14″E
- Country: Australia
- State: South Australia
- Region: Far North
- LGAs: Flinders Ranges Council; Pastoral Unincorporated Area
- Location: 90 km (56 mi) NE of Port Augusta
- Established: 16 January 1877

Area
  - Total: 2,940 km^{2} (1,135 sq mi)
Lands administrative divisions around Blachford
Lake Torrens	Taunton	Taunton
Lake Torrens	Blachford	Hanson
-	Newcastle	Granville
- Location; Adjoining counties

County of Blachford is a cadastral unit located in the Australian state of South Australia that covers land between the east coast of Lake Torrens and the western side of the Flinders Ranges about 90 kilometres (56 mi) north-east of the city of Port Augusta. It was proclaimed in 1877 and named after Frederic Rogers, 1st Baron Blachford who was the Under Secretary of State for the Colonies from 1860 to 1871. It has been partially divided in the following sub-units of hundreds – Barndioota, Cotabena, Warrakimbo, Wonoka and Woolyana.

== Description ==
The County of Blachford covers the part of South Australia extending from the east coast of Lake Torrens for about 40 kilometres (25 mi) along its northern boundary to the west side of the Flinders Ranges and then extending about 50 kilometres (31 mi) to the south of its northern boundary. It is bounded by the following counties - Taunton to the north and north-east, Hanson to the east, Granville to the south-east and by Newscastle to the south.

The county has a physical landscape consisting of a portion of the Flinders Ranges in its east and the floodplains draining from the ranges to Lake Torrens in its west.

The county's principal town is Hawker which is located in its south-east corner.

The county is served by one principal road, The Outback Highway, which passes through the county in a north–south direction from Quorn in the south through the hundreds of Wonoka and Woolyana including the town centre of Hawker to Parachilna in the north. The Outback Highway is also fed by traffic from the RM Williams Way which meets the highway to the south of Hawker.

The Marree railway line passes through the county in a north-easterly direction passing from the south via the hundreds of Warrakimbo, Barndiooota and Cotebena.

The county is located both within the state's Pastoral Unincorporated Area and the local government area of the Flinders Ranges Council with the latter occupying its south-east corner.

Land use within the county is concerned with agriculture which is dominated by the grazing of livestock, mining and tourism. Requirements published by the state government for both the ‘pastoral unincorporated area’ and the Flinders Ranges Council seeks to control land use and associated development to prevent “encroachment by incompatible land uses” and to protect the “scenic qualities of rural landscapes.” The land is west of the Marree railway line which is zoned respectively as ‘pastoral’ and ‘primary production’ is the basic requirement where developments such as wind farms can be considered. Land use and associated development to the east of the railway line is more highly controlled or even prohibited in some situations to conserve and protect “the natural character and environment of the area.”

== History ==
The County of Blachford was proclaimed on 18 January 1877. It was named after Frederic Rogers, 1st Baron Blachford who was the Under Secretary of State for the Colonies from 1860 to 1871.

The following hundreds have been proclaimed within the county - Wonoka in 1877, Woolyana in 1880, Barndioota in 1881, and Cotabena and Warrakimbo in 1888.

== Constituent hundreds ==
=== Location of hundreds ===
The hundreds are laid out from east to west from the boundary with the County of Hanson in two rows as follows:

- the northern row consisting of Woolyana and Cotabena, and
- the southern row consisting of Wonoka, Barndiotta and Warrakimbo

The total area of the hundreds accounts for 2,140 square kilometres (826 mi^{2}) out of the county's total area of 2,940 square kilometres (1,135 mi^{2}) or 72.8% of the county's area.

=== Hundred of Barndioota ===
The Hundred of Barndioota (31°51′31″S 138°10′25″E) was proclaimed on 3 March 1881. It covers an area of 490 square kilometres (188 mi^{2}) and its name is reported in one source as being was derived from an Aboriginal word whose meaning is not known while another states that it is “an Aboriginal word corrupted from the ‘Barndeootoo Run’ taken up by Hugh Proby in 1851.” Its boundaries coincide with those of the locality of Barndioota.

=== Hundred of Cotabena ===
The Hundred of Cotabena (31°37′21″S 138°10′52″E) was proclaimed on 6 December 1888. It covers an area of 490 square kilometres (188 mi^{2}) and its name is reported as being “an Aboriginal name taken from the sheep run held by R.B. Smith in the 1860s (lease no. 1659) at ‘Warrakimbo, Mount Eyre’.” It is located entirely within the south-west corner of the locality of Flinders Ranges.

=== Hundred of Warrakimbo ===
The Hundred of Warrakimbo (31°51′38″S 138°00′13″E) was proclaimed on 6 December 1888. It covers an area of 380 square kilometres (147 mi^{2}) and its name is reported as being “taken from an Aboriginal word applied to pastoral lease no. 1659 held by R.B. Smith in the 1860s.” The majority of its extent is located within the locality of Wallerberdina with a portion of Lake Torrens Station at its north and a portion of Yadlamalka at its south.

=== Hundred of Wonoka ===
The Hundred of Wonoka (31°51′31″S 138°21′24″E) was proclaimed on 18 January 1877. It covers an area of 390 square kilometres (151 mi^{2}) and its name is reported as being “an Aboriginal word meaning ‘daughter’, was a name given to a pastoral run by John McKinlay in 1851.” It entirely is located within the western side of the locality of Hawker.

=== Hundred of Woolyana ===
The Hundred of Woolyana (31°37′26″S 138°21′21″E) was proclaimed on 5 August 1880. It covers an area of 390 square kilometres (152 mi^{2}) and its name is derived from an Aboriginal word. It is entirely located within the boundaries of the locality of Flinders Ranges.

=== Gallery ===
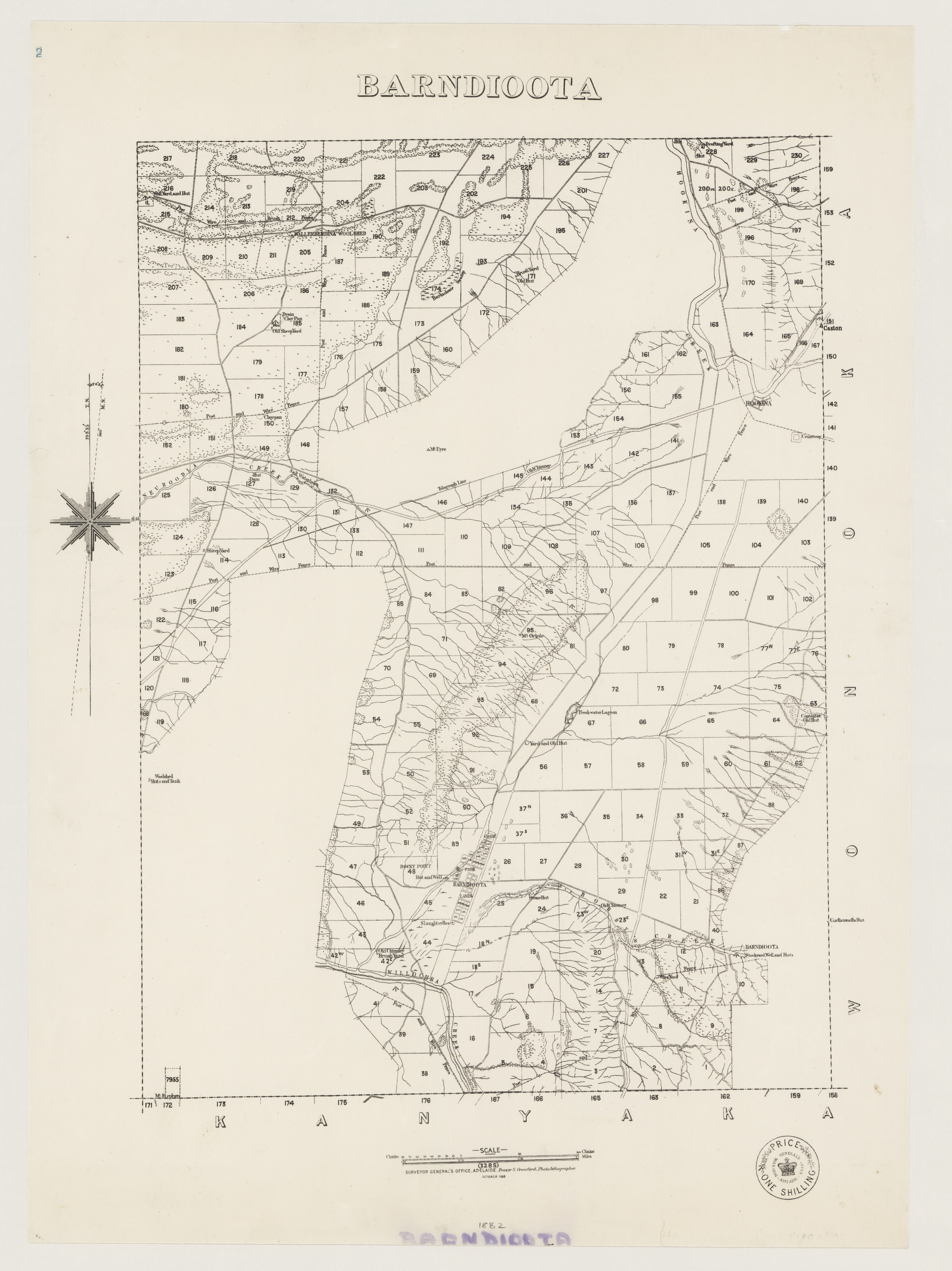
Hundred of Barndioota, 1882

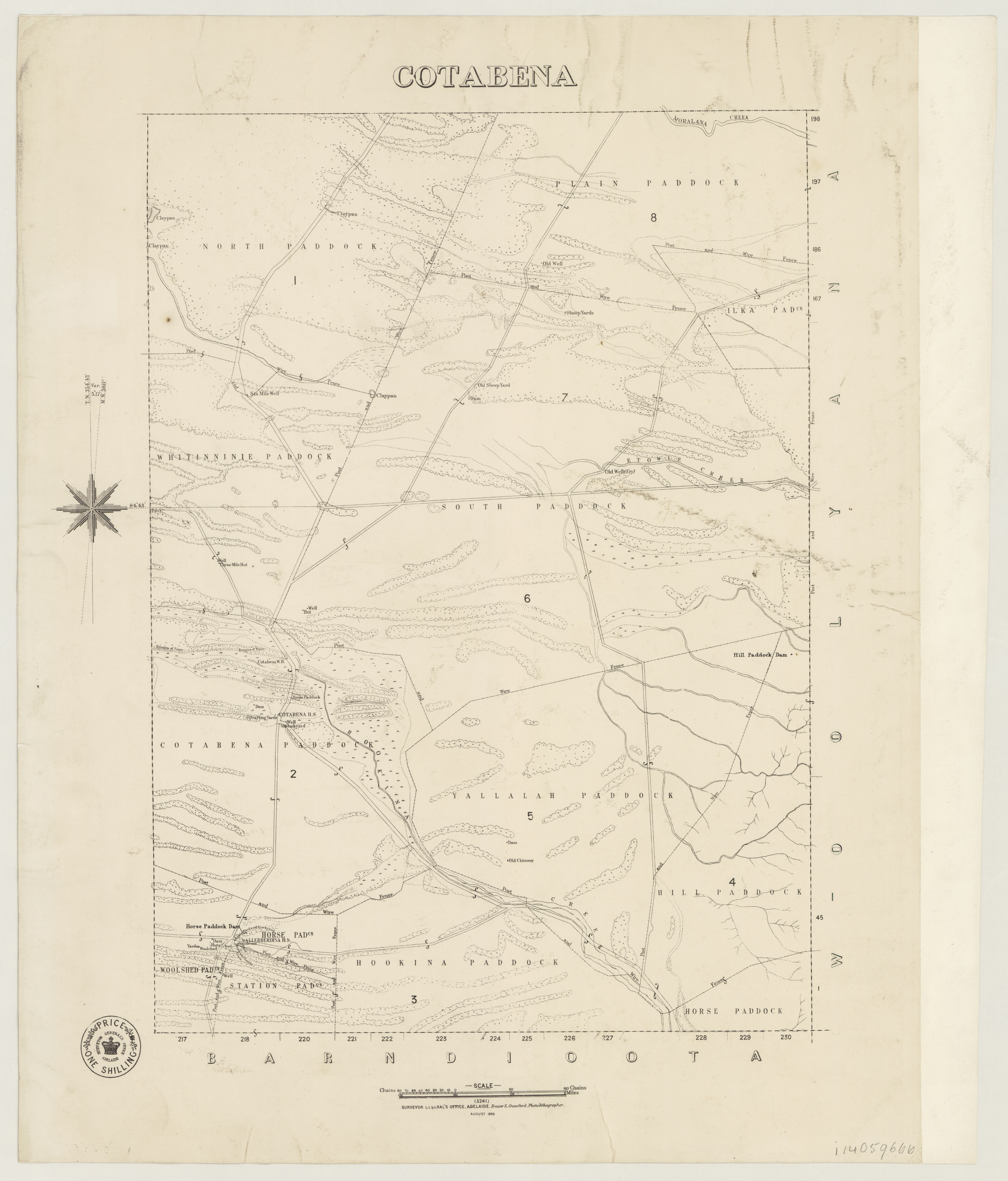
Hundred of Cotabena, 1888

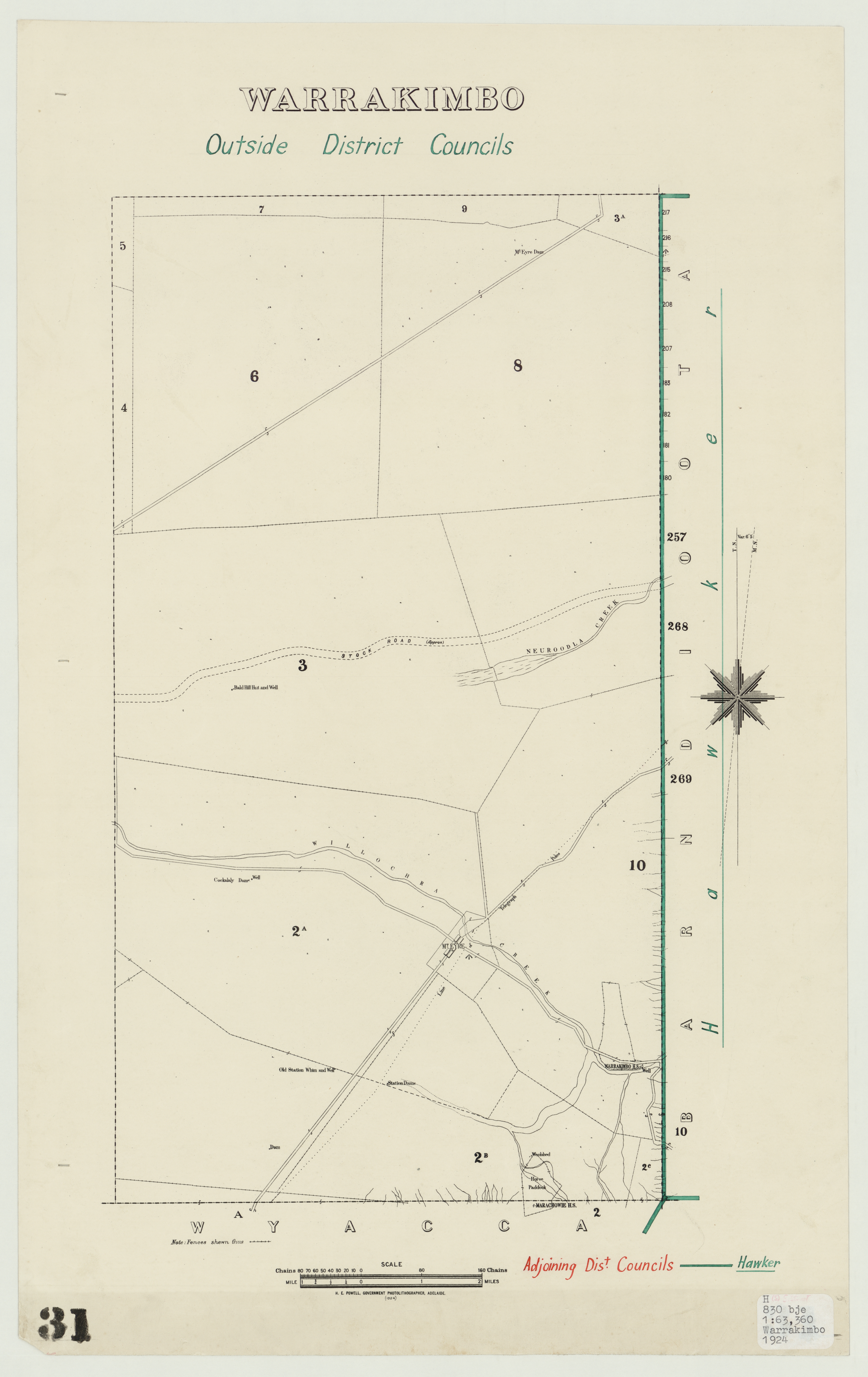
Hundred of Warrakimbo, 1924

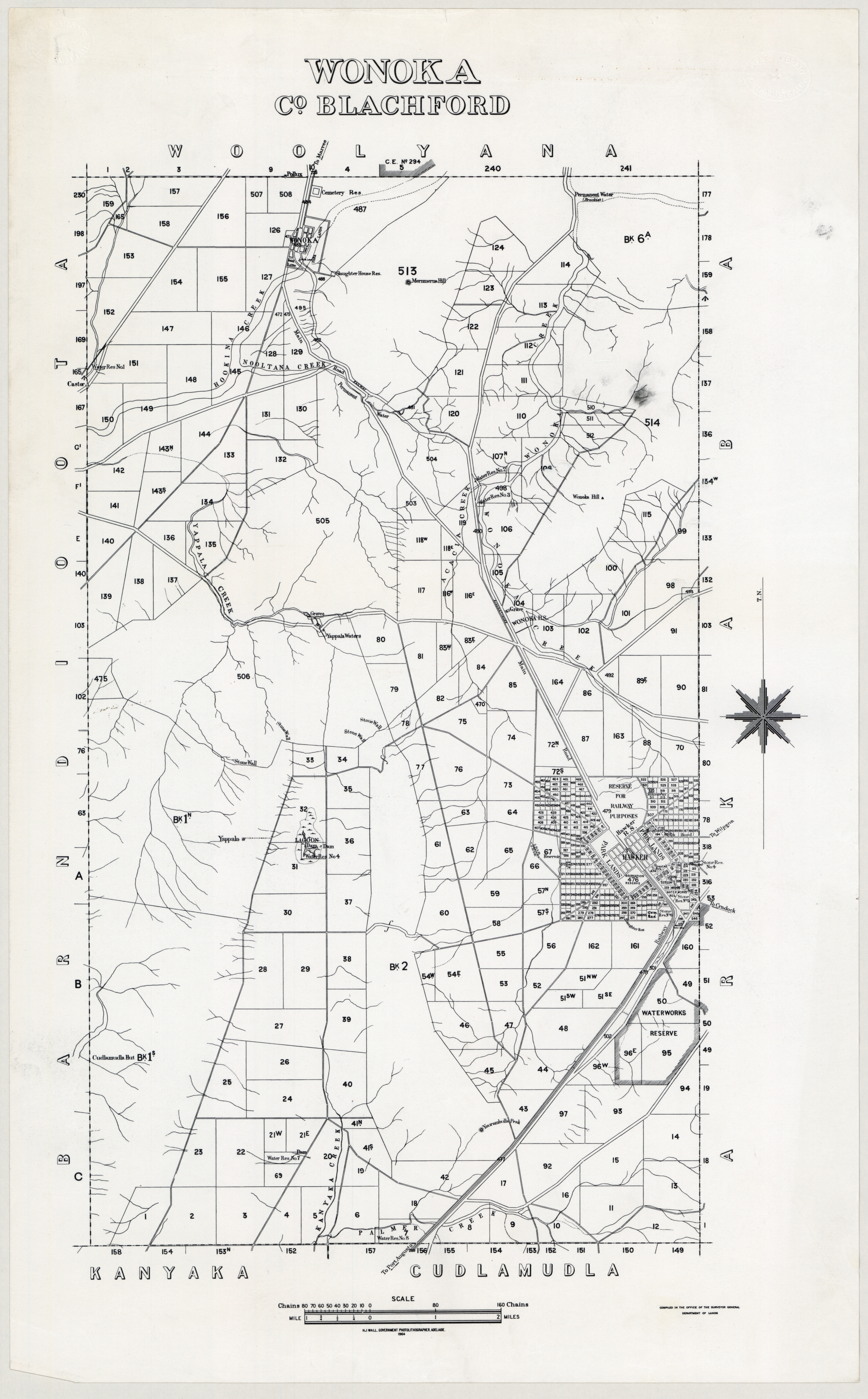
Hundred of Wonoka, 1964

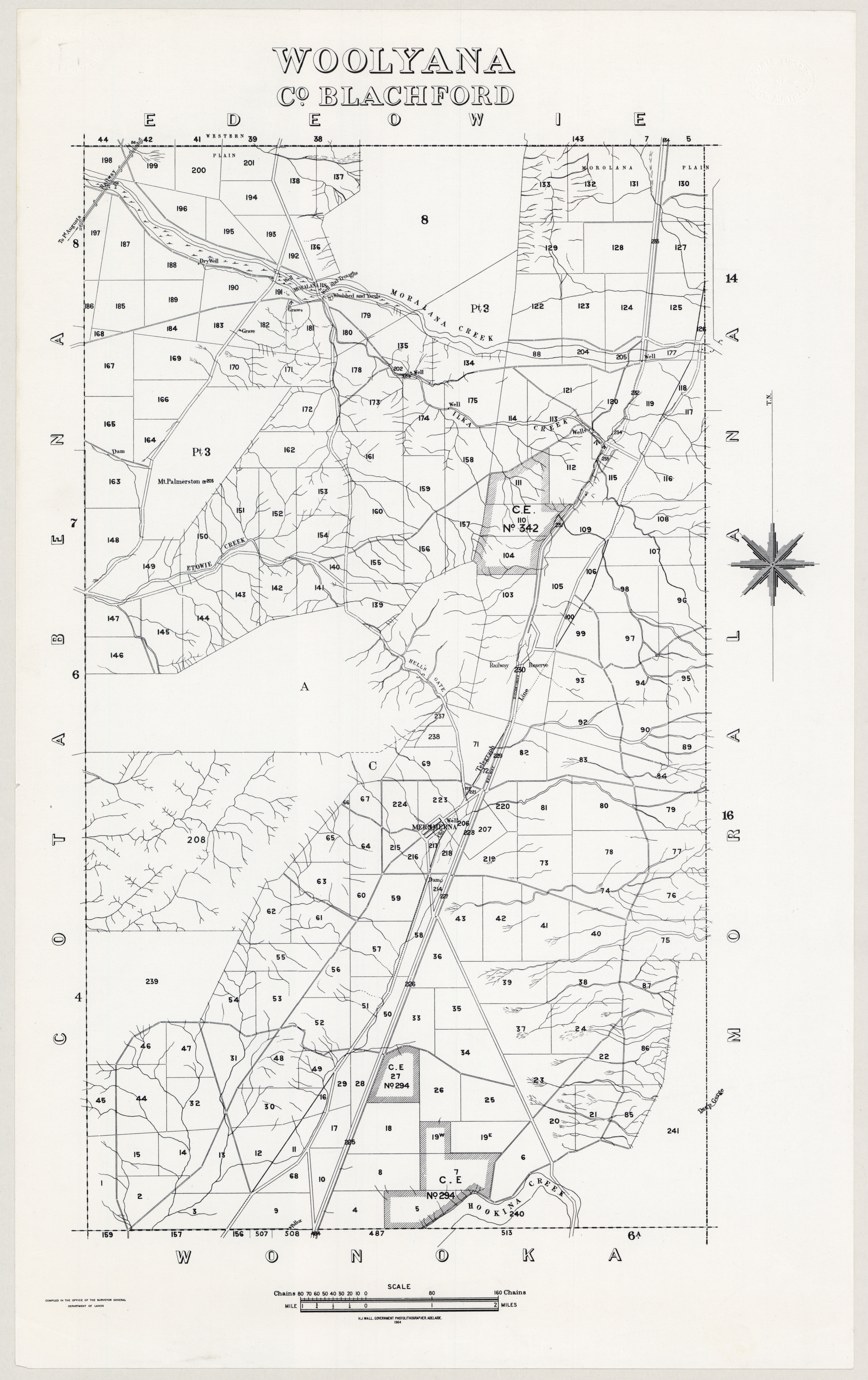
Hundred of Woolyana, 1964

== See also ==
- Lands administrative divisions of South Australia
- Blachford (disambiguation)
