= District Council of Hawker =

- Local government area
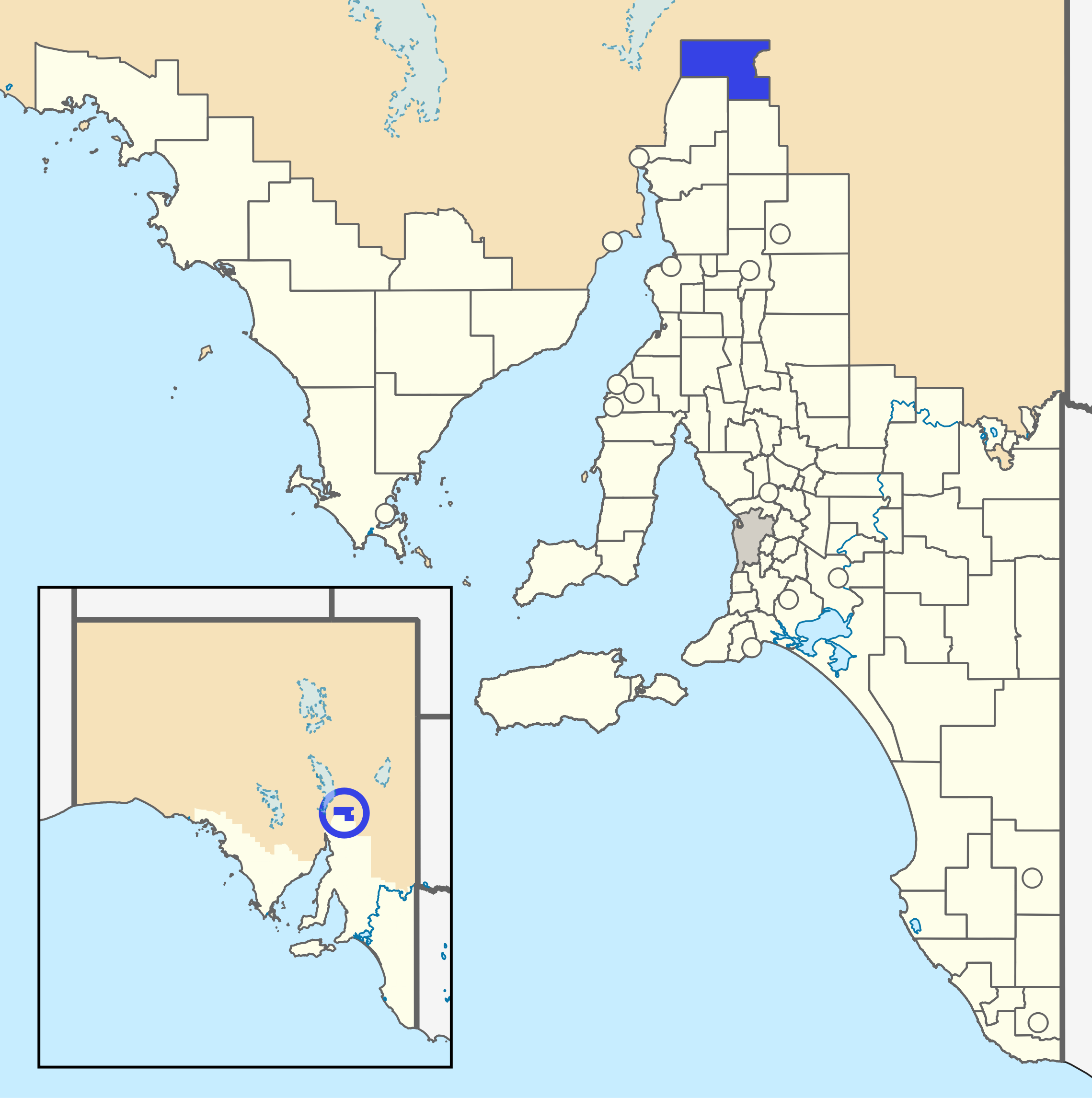
- The District Council of Hawker as it was prior to disestablishment (blue)
- Coordinates: 31.890640°S 138.423187°E
- Country: Australia
- State: South Australia
- Established: 1888
- Abolished: 1997
- Council seat: Hawker
LGAs around District Council of Hawker
| | District Council of Hawker |
| Davenport/ Woolundunga | Kanyaka; Kanyaka-Quorn | Eurelia/ Carrieton |

The District Council of Hawker was a local government area in South Australia from 1888 to 1997, centred on the town of Hawker. At its creation it was the northernmost local government area in the state.

== History ==
It was established on 5 January 1888 under the provisions of the District Councils Act 1887. It comprised the hundreds of Arkaba in the County of Hanson, Barndioota and Wonoka in the County of Blachford, and Wirreanda and Yednalue in the County of Granville. Land from each of the hundreds of Adams and Warcowie was added to the District Council on 12 May 1932. In 1936, it was reported to have an estimated population of 975 across an area of 300 square miles. In that year, the council elected a member from five wards, one for each of the initial hundreds. It amalgamated with the District Council of Kanyaka-Quorn to form the Flinders Ranges Council on 1 January 1997.

== Chairmen ==
- J. Edgeloe (1888)
- S. J. Jones (1888)
- W. F. King (1888–1889)
- W. J. Pyman (1901–1902, 1911–1918)
- M. B. Woods (1918)
- James Michael Gillick (1935–1940)
- Walter Joseph Webb (1940–1956)
- Donald Ivor McArthur (1956–1960)
- Henry Gifford Spiers (1960–1962)
- Lincoln James Dorward (1962–1969)
- John Thomas Hilder (1969–1979)
- Lindsay Milton Clarke (1979–1985)
- Henry John Spiers (1985–?)
