= Yarrah, South Australia =

Yarrah South Australia
- Coordinates: 32°11′50″S 137°52′28″E
- Population: 30 (SAL 2021)
- Established: November 1999
- Postcode(s): 5433
- Time zone: ACST (UTC+9:30)
  - Summer (DST): ACST (UTC+10:30)
- LGA(s): Flinders Ranges Council; Pastoral Unincorporated Area
- Region: Far North
- County: Newcastle
- State electorate(s): Giles
- Federal division(s): Grey
| Mean max temp | Mean min temp | Annual rainfall |
| 26.3 °C; 79 °F | 12.1 °C; 54 °F | 221.5 mm 8.7 in |
Localities around Yarrah:
| Wilkatana Station | Yadlamalka | Wallerberdina; Barndioota |
| Mount Arden | Yarrah | Kanyaka; Willochra |
| Emeroo | Emeroo; Quorn | Quorn |
- Footnotes: Adjoining localities

Yarrah is a rural locality in the Far North region of South Australia. The eastern section of Yarrah lies within the Flinders Ranges Council, while the western section lies in the Pastoral Unincorporated Area.

== History ==
The traditional owners of the area are the Barngarla people. The name 'Yarrah' is said to come from an Aboriginal word meaning "river red gum".

A township at Yarrah, located along the railway line, was surveyed in April 1863 and offered for sale on 21 July 1864 but was largely unsuccessful. The hundred of Yarrah was proclaimed on 16 December 1880 by Governor William Jervois.

Yarrah Post Office opened on 1 October 1887 and closed around 1909. Yarrah Primary School opened in 1893. In about 1919, it closed because of small attendance, but then re-opened in 1919, only to be closed permanently at a later date.

'The little galvanised-iron church at Yarraville [sic]' is mentioned in the Register newspaper.

Wilkatana railway station was located in the west of the hundred of Yarrah, named after nearby Wilkatana Station. The Depot Creek railway station, further to the south within the hundred of Yarrah, existed for many years; however, Pacific National advised in 2013 that the station had been closed, although the line continues to be in use. The historic Depot Creek Weir is located at Yarrah, and is listed on the South Australian Heritage Register. The weir dates from 1912 to 1917, when it was built as part of the supply infrastructure for the Port Augusta-Kalgoorlie section of the Trans-Australian Railway; the underlying springs had earlier been used by explorer Edward John Eyre.

The gazetted locality of Yarrah was created in November 1999. The locality's boundaries roughly equate to those of the hundred of Yarrah and approximately half of the adjacent hundred of Wyacca. In April 2013, an additional portion of formerly unincorporated land was added to the locality.

In 2013, Australia Post altered the local postcode from 5713 to 5433 as part of a review of outback postcodes.

Much of the 1950 film Bitter Springs, starring Chips Rafferty, was filmed at Yarrah.
