= Barndioota =

Barndioota may refer to:

- Barndioota, South Australia, a locality and former town
- Barndioota Road, at Hawker, South Australia, in the Flinders Ranges
- Barndioota Road, at Salisbury Plain, South Australia, in Adelaide
