= Kanyaka, South Australia =

Kanyaka South Australia

- Coordinates: 32.112°S 138.285°E
- Population: 8 (SAL 2021)
- Postcode(s): 5434
- Location: 32 km (20 mi) north-west of Quorn
- LGA(s): Flinders Ranges Council
- State electorate(s): Giles
- Federal division(s): Grey
Localities around Kanyaka:
Wallerberdina	Barndioota; Hawker	Hawker
Yarrah	Kanyaka	Cradock
Yarrah	Willochra; Moockra	Cradock

Kanyaka is a rural locality in the Far North region of South Australia, situated in the Flinders Ranges Council.

Kanyaka Station, a prominent pastoral holding in the region, was taken up in 1852 by Hugh Proby. It became one of the largest stations in the area, reportedly employing up to seventy families at one stage. In 1856, the station owner built an eating house on the main road to divert visitors away from the main station. A government town of Kanyaka along the main road was surveyed in 1863, although not proclaimed; although the Kanyaka township itself would be a failure and the least successful of the four former towns in the modern-day locality, it allowed for the construction of a two-story hotel, the Great Northern Hotel, on the main road in 1865. Kanyaka Post Office had opened on 6 October 1858, and a general store would operate alongside it in the 1860s.

The Hundred of Kanyaka was gazetted on 6 July 1876 by Governor Anthony Musgrave; it was noted that the Kanyaka name reportedly stemmed from an Aboriginal name for a local waterhole. The Hundred of Kanyaka and the northern section of the adjacent Hundred of Cudlamunda roughly correlates to the boundaries of the modern-day Kanyaka locality. The District Council of Kanyaka was created in 1888 to represent the area of the station and cadastral hundred; its council seat, however, would lie outside its boundaries in the town of Quorn. The modern locality of Kanyaka was established in 1999, when boundaries were formalised and named after the former Kanyaka Station in respect of the long-established local name. The modern locality also subsumed four former government towns: Kanyaka, Gordon, Simmonston, and Wilson, as well as their surrounding pastoral lands.

Of the four former towns now in the Kanyaka locality, three were located along the modern Flinders Ranges Way. Kanyaka township itself had been the smallest; it had been surveyed in 1863 but not proclaimed and was entirely based along the main road. Wilson, further to the north along the same road, was a larger village with around eleven blocks on either side of the main road. It was surveyed in November 1880, and named after Charles Wilson, a "brother officer" of Governor William Jervois. Wilson had a railway station on the Central Australia Railway line, which had been previously known as the Palmer siding, and closed when the local railway was re-routed through Parachilna. The former Kanyaka Post Office was renamed the Wilson Post Office on 28 February 1881. Gordon, located along the road to the south, on the edge of the modern border with Willochra was another village of several blocks, named on 2 October 1879 by Governor Jervois, reportedly after one of his brothers; it also contained its own railway station. The fourth town, Simmonston was located in the west of the locality; it is recorded as having been gazetted in 1876 but named in 1880.

Today, the ruins of the Kanyaka Station complex (32.0726°S 138.2997°E), including the nearby woolshed and cemetery, and the stone walling on the opposite side of the Hawker road, are located on the South Australian Heritage Register. The historic Wirreanda Creek Railway Bridge, located just off Flinders Ranges Way, is also located on the Heritage Register.
