= Simmonston =

Simmonston Kanyaka, South Australia
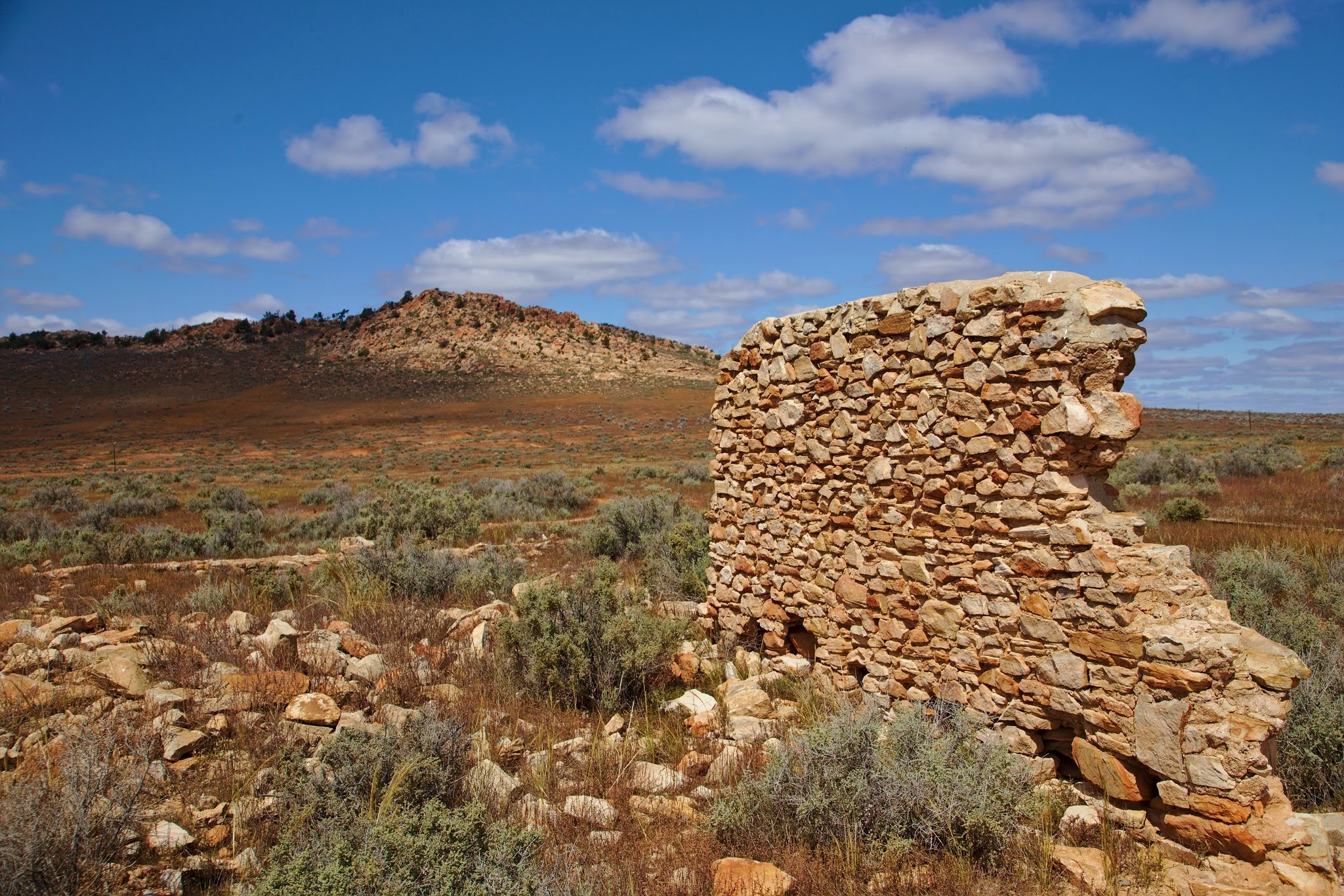
- Ruins of the half-built hotel at Simmonston

- Coordinates: 32°04′22″S 138°09′08″E
- Established: 15 April 1880
- LGA(s): Flinders Ranges Council

Simmonston was a former town in South Australia which was abandoned before completion in the early 1880s. The town was originally intended to be on the new railway extending north from Quorn, but the final route passed through Gordon instead. Today, the stone ruins of a hotel and its cellars are still visible. The town is reported as being "named after Sir Lintorn Simmons, Field Marshal and Commandant of the Royal Engineers" by William Jervois, the 10th Governor of South Australia. The creation of the town was announced in April 1880 as follows: "Portions of Crown Lands in the Hundred of Kanyaka have been reserved as a site for the new town of Simmonston." Plans to build the hotel were announced three weeks later in May 1880 by a D. McFie. The site of the former town is currently located in the gazetted locality of Kanyaka and within the local government area of the Flinders Ranges Council.
