= Hundred of Wonoka =

Coordinates: 31.857°S 138.358°E

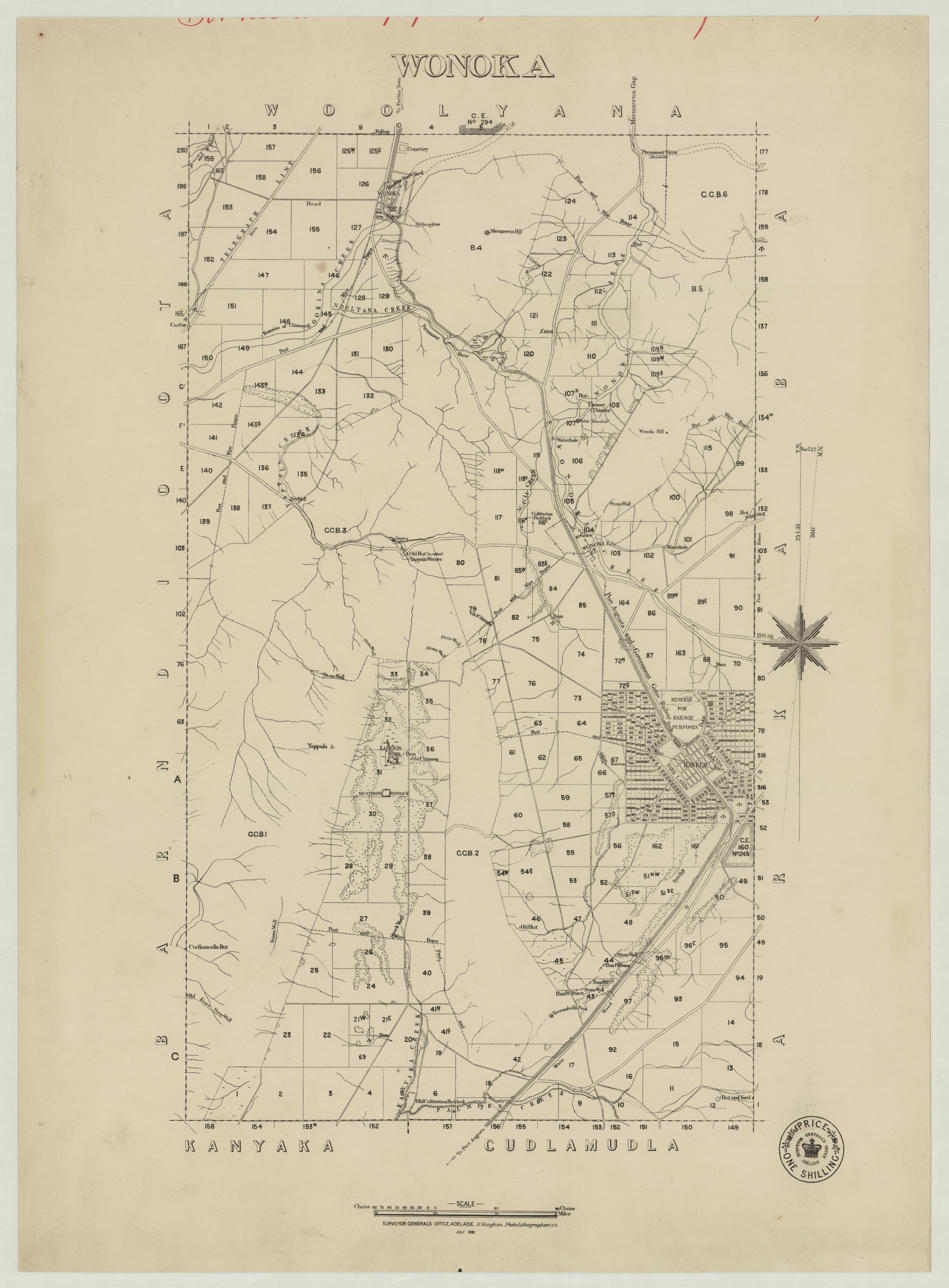
Hundred of Wonoka, 1891

The Hundred of Wonoka is a cadastral unit of hundred in the County of Blachford, South Australia.

== Local government ==
The hundred was first locally governed by the District Council of Hawker, with Wonoka ward electing one dedicated councillor. In 1997 the hundred become a part of the Flinders Ranges Council with the amalgamation of Hawker and Kanyaka councils.

== See also ==
- Lands administrative divisions of South Australia
