= Flinders Ranges, South Australia =

Flinders Ranges
- Suburb
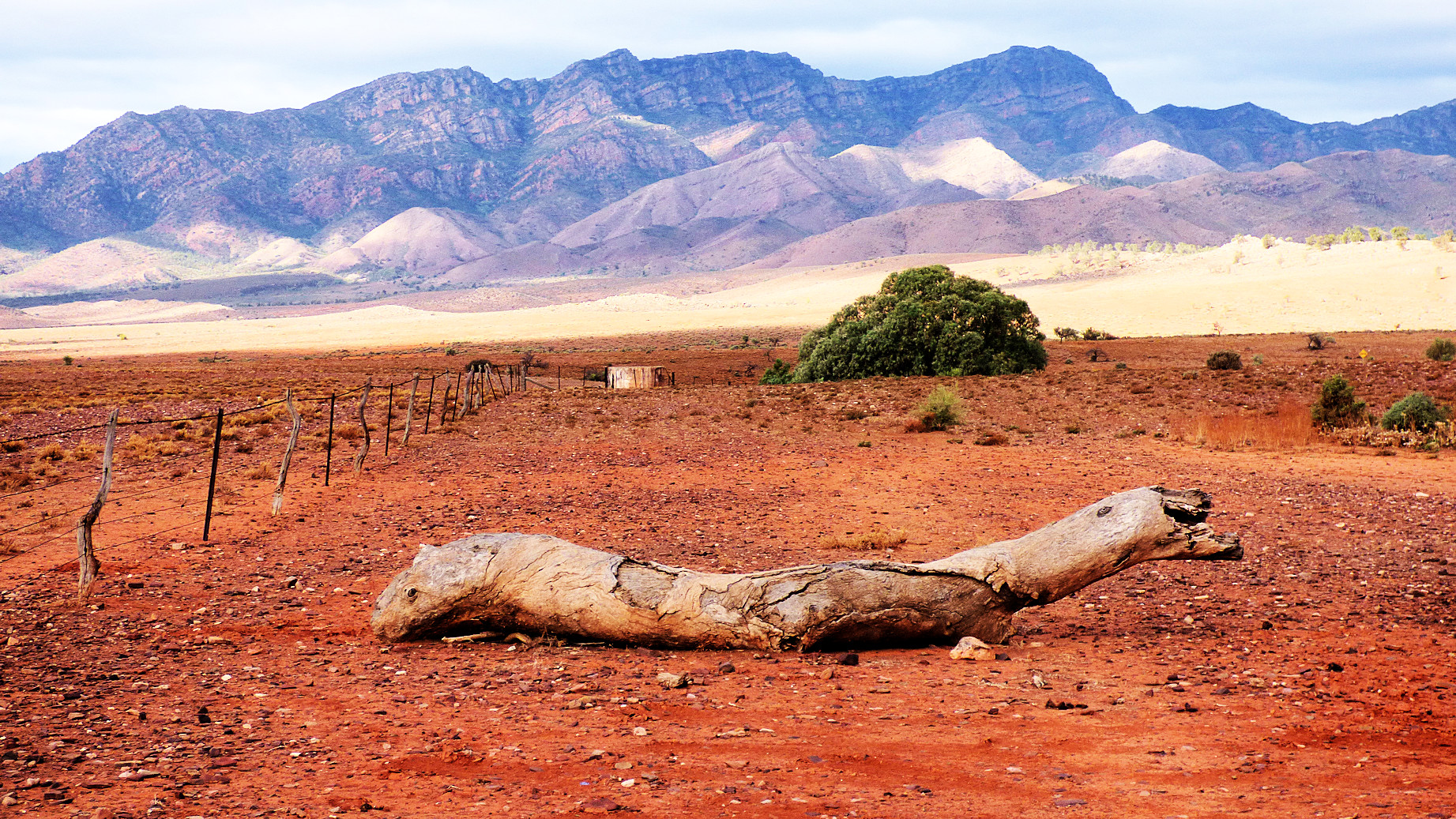
- A view of Flinders Ranges

- Coordinates: 31°29′30″S 138°29′09″E
- Country: Australia
- State: South Australia
- Region: Far North
- LGAs: Flinders Ranges Council; Pastoral Unincorporated Area
- Location: 380 km (240 mi) north of Adelaide; 86 km (53 mi) north-east of Quorn; 131 km (81 mi) north-east of Port Augusta
- Established: 2013

Government
  - State electorate: Giles Stuart
  - Federal division: Grey

Population
  - Total: 20 (SAL 2021)
- Time zone: UTC+9:30 (ACST)
  - Summer (DST): UTC+10:30 (ACST)
- Postcode: 5434
- County: Blachford; Hanson; Taunton
- Mean max temp: 25.3 °C (77.5 °F)
- Mean min temp: 10.7 °C (51.3 °F)
- Annual rainfall: 307.2 mm (12.09 in)
Suburbs around Flinders Ranges
See Adjoining localities

Flinders Ranges is a locality in the Australian state of South Australia located in the mountain range of the same name, about 380 km (240 mi) north of the state capital of Adelaide, about 86 km (53 mi) north-east of the municipal seat in Quorn and about 131 km (81 mi) north-east of the regional centre of Port Augusta.

== History ==
Its boundaries were created in April 2013, with the name selected in respect to the ‘long established local name’. Its southern boundary was altered in November 2013 with the addition of land from Hawker and the transfer of land to Shaggy Ridge. The sites of the government towns of Edeowie and Mernmerna are also within its boundaries. These town were both surveyed in 1863. Edeowie Post Office was open from c. 1870 to 1876 and then from 1879 to 1881, while Mernmerna Post Office was open from 1874 to 1881 and then again for a period in 1905.

== Geography ==
Flinders Ranges consists of the part of the mountain range between the ‘town centre’ of Hawker in the south and the 'town centre' of Parachilna in the north, as well as some land to the west of the range. In the north east it contains all of the protected areas of the Ikara–Flinders Ranges National Park and Bunkers Conservation Reserve, whose eastern boundaries align with that of the locality. The Marree railway line and The Outback Highway both pass through the west side of the locality while the Flinders Ranges Way passes through the south-east side.

As of 2012, its land use was either pastoral farming or conservation. The Marree railway line is the boundary between these uses, with pastoral farming to the west and land to the east zoned for conservation, including the Ikara-Flinders Ranges National Park and the Bunker Conservation Reserve.

== Governance ==
Flinders Ranges is located within the federal division of Grey, the state electoral districts of Giles and Stuart, the local government area of the Flinders Ranges Council, the Pastoral Unincorporated Area of South Australia, and the state's Far North region.

== Heritage listings ==
Flinders Ranges contains a number of places listed on the South Australian Heritage Register, including:

- Ajax Mine Fossil Reef
- Aroona Valley: Hayward Homestead Ruins
- Aroona Valley: Eddie Pumpa Outstation
- Brachina Gorge: Impact Ejecta Horizon Late Precambrian Shales Geological Site
- Brachina Road: Enorama Outstation and Mail Station Ruins
- Wilpena Pound Geological Landform
- Stromatolites in the Precambrian Trezona Formation, Ikara-Flinders Ranges National Park
- Wilkawillina Archaeocyathae Geological Site
- Oraparinna Diapir
- Tufa Waterfall
- Enorama Diapir
- Appealinna Mine Ruins and Miner's Hut
- Blacksmith's Shop, Oraparinna Station
- Dingley Dell Homestead Ruins
- Wills Homestead Complex Ruins
- Hill's Cottage, Wilpena Pound
- Wilpena Homestead Complex

== Adjoining localities ==
Flinders Ranges is bounded by the following localities:

- Northwest: Motpena,
- North: Motpena, Mount Falkland, Alpana, Gum Creek Station and Agorigina.
- Northeast: Wirrealpa
- East: Wirrealpa, Willow Springs, Upalinna, Prelinna, Mount Havelock and Willippa.
- Southeast: Black Hill Station
- South: Barndioota, Hawker, Shaggy Ridge and Black Hill Station
- Southwest: Wallerberdina
- West: Motpena, Wintabatinyana, Lake Torrens Station

== See also ==
- St Mary Peak
- Edeowie Station
- Cazneaux Tree
