= Hundred of Yednalue =

Coordinates: 32.048°S 138.672°E

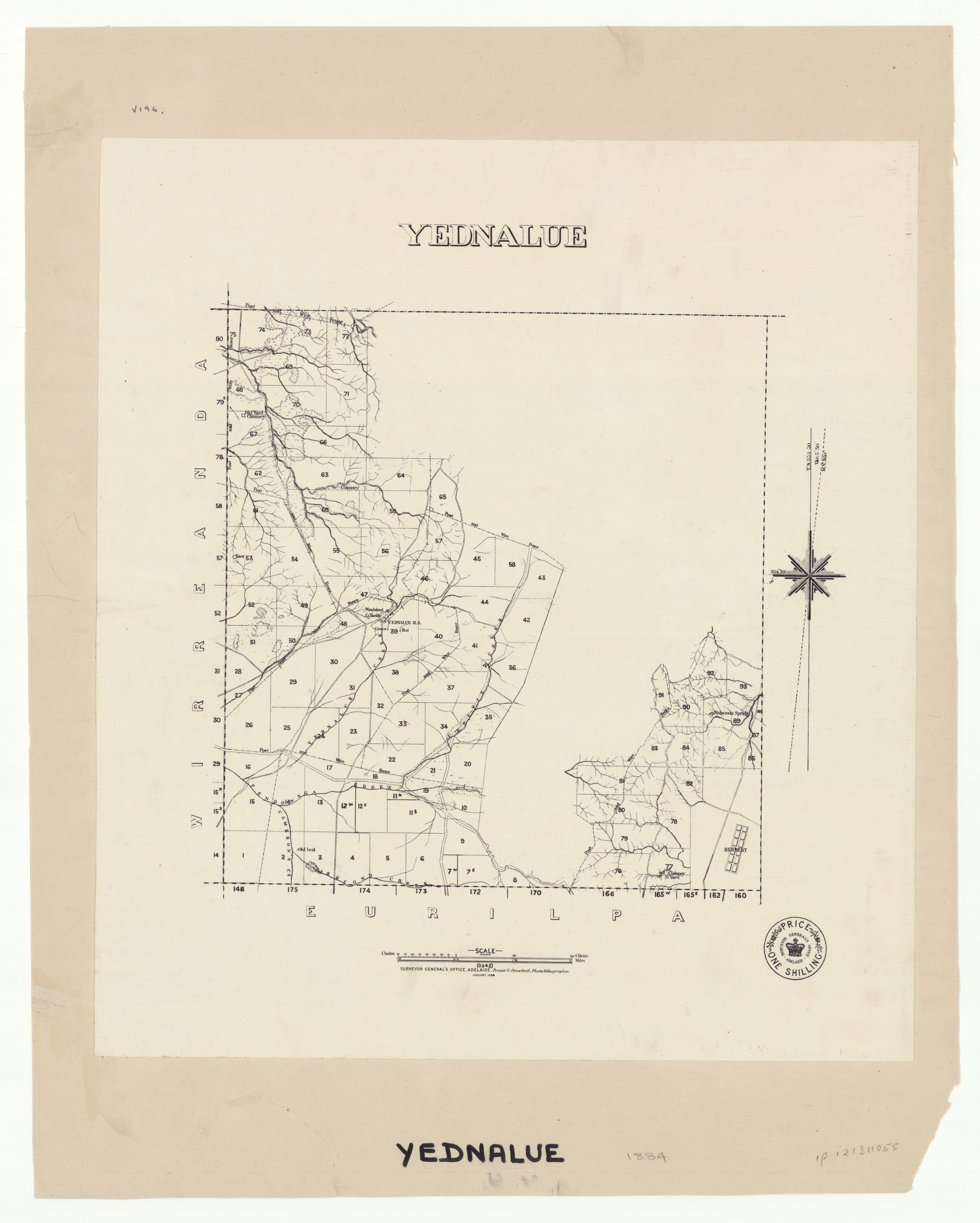
Hundred of Yednalue, 1884

The Hundred of Yednalue is a cadastral unit of hundred in the County of Granville, South Australia.

== History ==
The Hundred of Yednalue was proclaimed on 18 January 1877 in the County of Granville.

In 1885, it was reported that "all the spinifex or porcupine grass which affords both food and shelter for the rabbits was systematically burned so the rabbits [...] became an easy prey for dogs".

The Yednalue School opened in 1887 and closed in 1926.

The hundred was first locally governed by the District Council of Hawker when it was established in 1888. The hundred was represented by Yednalue ward, electing one dedicated councillor. In 1997 local administration of the hundred moved to the Flinders Ranges Council following the amalgamation of Hawker and Kanyaka councils.

== See also ==
- Hundreds of South Australia
- County of Granville
- South Australia
- Flinders Ranges Council
- District Council of Hawker
- District Council of Kanyaka
- Cadastral divisions of South Australia
- Lands administrative divisions of South Australia
