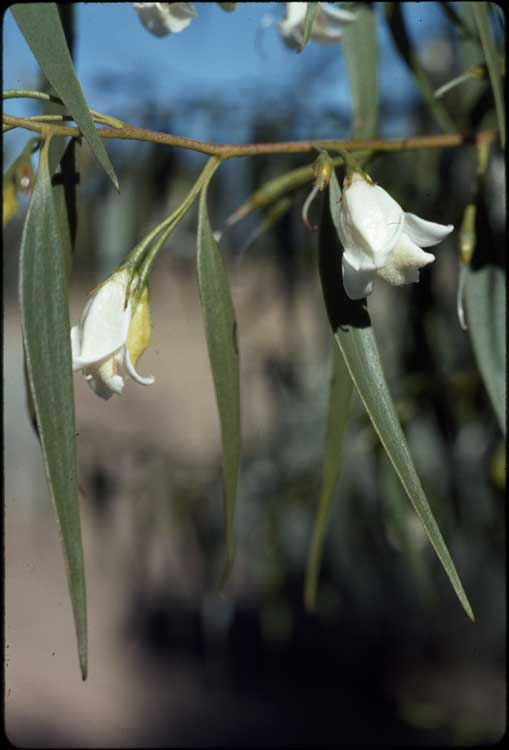

Scientific classification
- Kingdom: Plantae
- Clade: Embryophytes
- Clade: Tracheophytes
- Clade: Spermatophytes
- Clade: Angiosperms
- Clade: Eudicots
- Clade: Asterids
- Order: Lamiales
- Family: Scrophulariaceae
- Genus: Eremophila
- Species: E. santalina

Binomial name
- Eremophila santalina (F.Muell.) F.Muell.

Synonyms
- Pholidiopsis santalina F.Muell.; Pholidia santalina (F.Muell) Benth.; Bontia santalina (F.Muell) Kuntze

= Eremophila santalina =

Species of flowering plant

Eremophila santalina is a flowering plant in the figwort family, Scrophulariaceae and is endemic to South Australia. It is an erect, glabrous shrub with thin branches, flexible leaves and white or cream-coloured flowers which sometimes have a slight pinkish-purple tinge.

== Description ==
Eremophila santalina is an erect, rounded, glabrous shrub or small tree which grows to a height of between 1 and 6 m (3 and 20 ft) and which often has weak, drooping branches. The branches and leaves are sticky when young, due to the presence of resin. The leaves are thin and flexible, linear to lance-shaped, sometimes sickle-shaped, taper towards both ends, mostly 42–95 mm (2–4 in) long, 3.5–12 mm (0.1–0.5 in) wide and have a hooked end.

The flowers are borne singly or in pairs in leaf axils on a glabrous stalk 10–21 mm (0.4–0.8 in) long. There are 5 green, tapering sepals which are 2–6 mm (0.08–0.2 in) long. The petals are 10–20 mm (0.39–0.79 in) long and are joined at their lower end to form a tube. The petal tube is white to cream-coloured often with a pinkish-purple tinge and lacks spots. The petal tube and lobes are glabrous apart from the inside of the middle part of the lower lobe which has long soft hairs. The lower lobe is also raised so that it closes the petal tube. The 4 stamens are enclosed in the petal tube. Flowering occurs mainly from July to October and is followed by fruits which are almost spherical, slightly fleshy, 6–10.5 mm (0.2–0.4 in) long and have a shiny, smooth yellowish-brown surface.

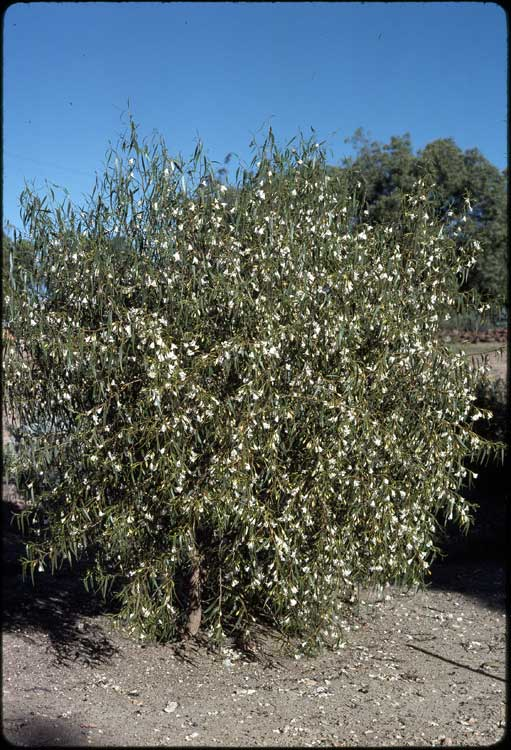
Eremophila santalina growth habit

== Taxonomy ==
The species was first formally described in 1853 by Ferdinand von Mueller who gave it the name Pholidiopsis santalina and published the description in Linnaea. In 1860, Mueller changed the name to Eremophila santalina and published the change in Papers and Proceedings of the Royal Society of Van Diemen's Land. The specific epithet (santalina) refers to the similarity of the habit of this species to that of plants in the Santalaceae genus Santalum.

== Distribution and habitat ==
Eremophila santalina grows on rocky hillsides and along stream beds between Hawker and Mambray Creek in the Mount Remarkable National Park in the Flinders Ranges and Eyre Peninsula botanical regions of South Australia.

== Use in horticulture ==
The pendulous branches and dark green leaves as well as the hanging flowers are attractive features of this large shrub. It can be propagated from cuttings, although roots are often slow to develop. It will grow in a range of soils, including clay but faster in lighter soils in full sun. It is very drought tolerant and relatively frost hardy. Unusually, it will tolerate high humidity and is grown successfully in areas like Sydney and coastal areas of Victoria.
