= Hookina, South Australia =

Ghost town in South Australia

Hookina
- Town
- Coordinates: 31.805830°S 138.262130°E
- Country: Australia
- State: South Australia
- LGA: Flinders Ranges Council
- Location: 21 km (13 mi) NW of Hawker
- Established: 1862

Hookina is a former town in the Flinders Ranges in South Australia.

It is now included as part of the bounded locality of Barndioota. It was surveyed in 1862 on the route for transporting ore from mines at Blinman to the coast. By the time it was surveyed, there was already a 12-room inn and a blacksmith shop. Up to 130 bullock teamsters could camp in the area as it provided a secure water supply. A Catholic church was built at Hookina in 1885 and was demolished in 1966. The inn closed in 1896 following a drought that led to sand piling up against the building. The last publican was refused renewal of his licence, so he removed the roof iron and moved to the nearby township of Wonoka a little further upstream along the creek, where the Hookina siding on the Central Australia Railway was.
