= Eyre's 1839 expeditions =

1839 explorations of interior South Australia

In 1839, Edward John Eyre made two expeditions to explore the interior of South Australia, at a time when the territory was almost completely unknown to European colonists beyond the head of Spencer Gulf. The first expedition, in May, set out from Adelaide. Eyre traveled as far as the Flinders Ranges, though it is not clear exactly how far north he reached before turning back. The second expedition, in August, sailed to Port Lincoln and then struck west, following the coast to Streaky Bay. Forced back again by inhospitable conditions, he went east and then further north than his previous attempt, eventually discovering the endorheic Lake Torrens.

Eyre later made a third trip north in June 1840, this time reaching what is now known as Lake Eyre. A fourth trip began in February 1841 with the goal of reaching Western Australia. The trek began at Fowlers Bay and reached Albany in July, a trip of 1,600 kilometres (990 miles).

== First expedition ==
Having made a tidy profit of several thousand pounds from his second overlanding trip, the young Eyre (then only 23 years old) turned his attention to the interior and speculations surrounding the possibility of a navigable inland sea. Planning a three-month expedition to the head of the Spencer Gulf, he left Adelaide with five other men on 1 May 1839, taking two drays and travelling north towards the coastal plain west of the Flinders Ranges. He named the Broughton River after William Grant Broughton, the Anglican Bishop of Australia, and then proceeded northward past the head of Spencer Gulf to establish a camp halfway between The Dutchmans Stern and Mount Arden at a small creek with permanent springs in it; he named it Depot Creek and was to return to it several times in future years.

From this camp Eyre espied a low range of hills to the west and sent his companion John Baxter to investigate – this range he later named the Baxter Range. It lies north of the town of Iron Knob. Eyre himself set off north along the margin of the Flinders. Finding little fresh water (the pools of water in Willochra Creek were salty), he made for a hill some 30 kilometres (19 mi) northwest of the later town of Hawker. From the summit he had his first view of Lake Torrens; he later wrote that it "seemed to be water", but he realised it was merely the "dry and glazed bed of where water had lodged" – a salt lake. To the northeast he noted that the ranges continued: "tier behind tier of very rocky appearance as far as the eye could reach". This was almost certainly the first time that a European had glimpsed the peaks of Wilpena Pound.

After returning to camp and a brief foray 50 kilometres (31 mi) down the western side of Spencer Gulf with Baxter, Eyre decided to return southwards. He was dissatisfied with the saltbush country (as he described it, "sandy desert interspersed with scrub"), not realising the grazing potential of the saltbush.

On his return trip he turned east after leaving the Flinders behind and instead travelled back to Adelaide down the River Murray, reaching home on 29 June. The Governor soon named his northernmost point Mount Eyre.

== Second expedition ==
Restless, Eyre dallied little before setting sail for Port Lincoln on his 24th birthday, 5 August 1839. His small party travelled along the coast to the vicinity of Streaky Bay before Eyre struck out alone with an Aboriginal companion. They reached their farthest point some 50 km (31 mi) west of the modern site of Ceduna, before being forced back by lack of water. It was during this trip that they passed Lake Newland, which Eyre named after his friend Richard Francis Newland.

Eyre then led his party across country back to the head of Spencer Gulf and their old campsite at Depot Creek, visiting and naming the Gawler Ranges (for the Governor) on the way. Determined to explore farther, he travelled north alone, this time going about 80 km (50 mi) farther than Mount Eyre, reaching a peak a little southwest of modern-day Leigh Creek. From here he saw that Lake Torrens was now filled with water, but it still blocked his path. He was compelled to return, being without any support. Back at camp he conferred with Baxter, whom he had sent east. Baxter is assumed to have crossed the Willochra Plain, and after travelling some 100 km (62 mi), he had seen what he called nothing but a "low flat sea of scrub". Eyre returned to Adelaide directly, giving glowing reports of what was to become the Clare Valley. He later made two further expeditions in 1840 and 1841.
