= Corporate Town of Quorn =

Corporate Town of Quorn South Australia
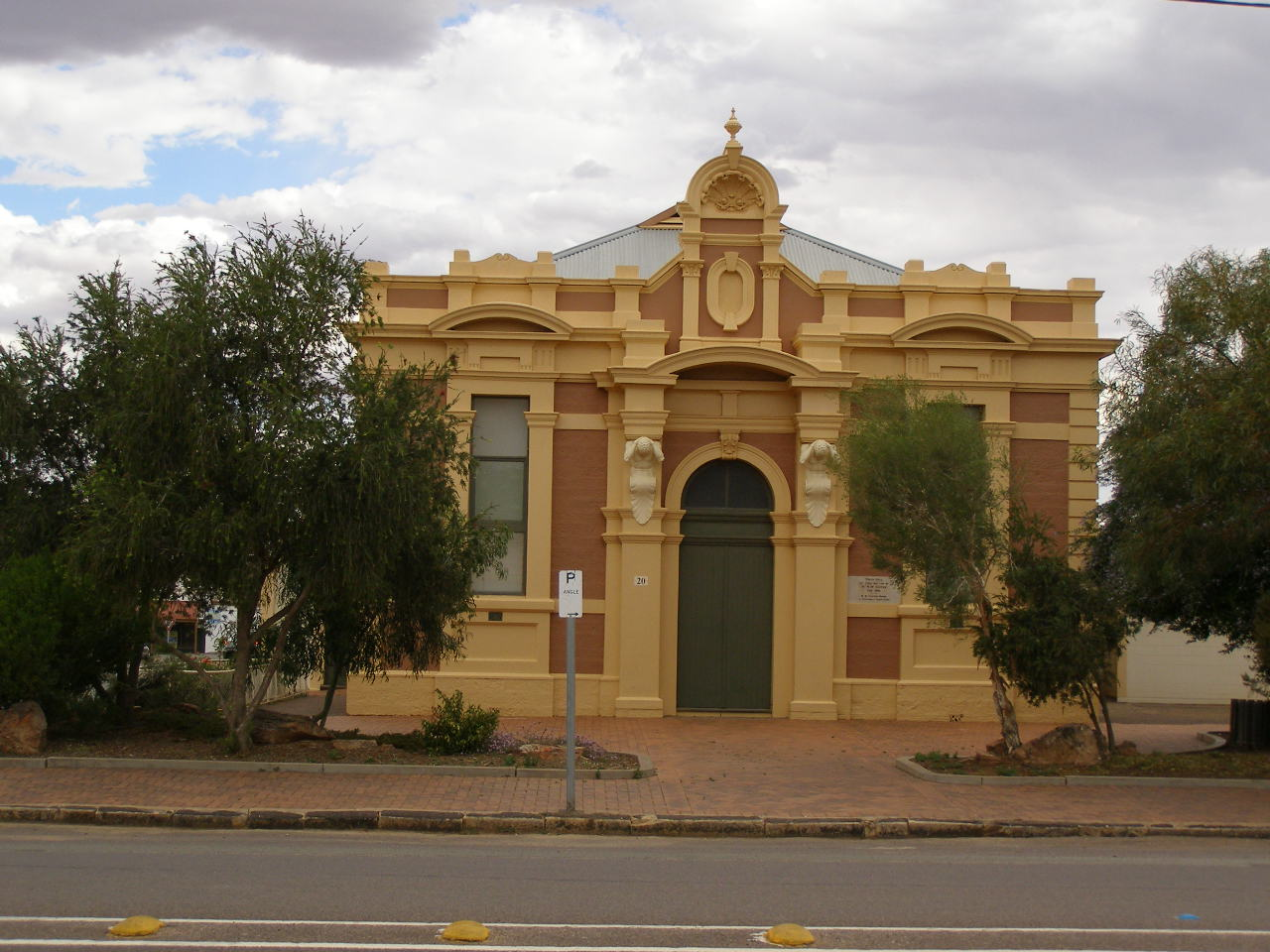
- Quorn Town Hall was shared by Quorn and Kanyaka councils

- Coordinates: 32.345428°S 138.041729°E
- Established: 1883
- Abolished: 1969
- Council seat: Quorn
LGAs around Corporate Town of Quorn:
| Kanyaka | Kanyaka | Kanyaka |
| Kanyaka | Corporate Town of Quorn | Kanyaka |
| Kanyaka | Kanyaka | Kanyaka |

The Corporate Town of Quorn was a local government area in South Australia from 1883 to 1969, centred on the town of Quorn.

It was incorporated on 25 October 1883, prior to the 1888 establishment of the rural District Council of Kanyaka, which surrounded the town for most of its history. It consisted of a 171-acre area in Quorn township itself, with parkland surrounding the town subsequently serving as the boundary with the Kanyaka council. It was divided into four wards: North, South, East and West, each represented by two councillors. It gained a small section of the cadastral Hundred of Pichi Richi on 18 April 1888.

The council was based out of the Quorn Town Hall from the building's opening in 1891 until 1953, when it moved to a purpose-built standalone council chamber in Seventh Street. The council was responsible for water supply in Quorn from 1898 to 1943, and responsible for electricity supply from 1923 onwards; it generated its own electricity until 1959-60, and resold power purchased from the Electricity Trust of South Australia for the remainder of its existence. Its population in 1936 was reported to be 1,080.

It merged with the District Council of Kanyaka on 1 April 1969 to form the District Council of Kanyaka-Quorn. Both former council chambers survive, with both its successor councils (Kanyaka-Quorn and the Flinders Ranges Council) based out of the 1953 building, and the former town hall remaining as a heritage-listed public hall.

== Mayors of Quorn ==
- William Charles Barton (1883–1885)
- Edward Manton (1885–1886)
- James Mansom (1886–1888)
- John Lord (1888–1890)
- Richard Foster (1890–1892)
- John Rock (1892–1894)
- Robert Thompson (1894–1899)
- H. Matthews (1899–1902)
- Robert Thompson (1902–1910)
- John C. Turner (1910–1914)
- Robert Thompson (1914–1928)
- S. C. Chennell (1928–1932)
- David Hammond (1932–1936)
- Leonard Blackwell Adams (1936–1943)
- Clarence James Stephens (1943–1945)
- Frederick Allan Smith (1945–1946)
- Alfred Claude Thompson (1946–1949)
- Andrew John Neville (1949–1951)
- John Neales White (1951–1953)
- Frank Wilford Roberts (1953–1958)
- Archie Ronald Burden (1958–1961)
- Frank Wilford Roberts (1961–1969)
