= Quorn Town Hall =

Heritage-listed binding in Quorn, South Australia

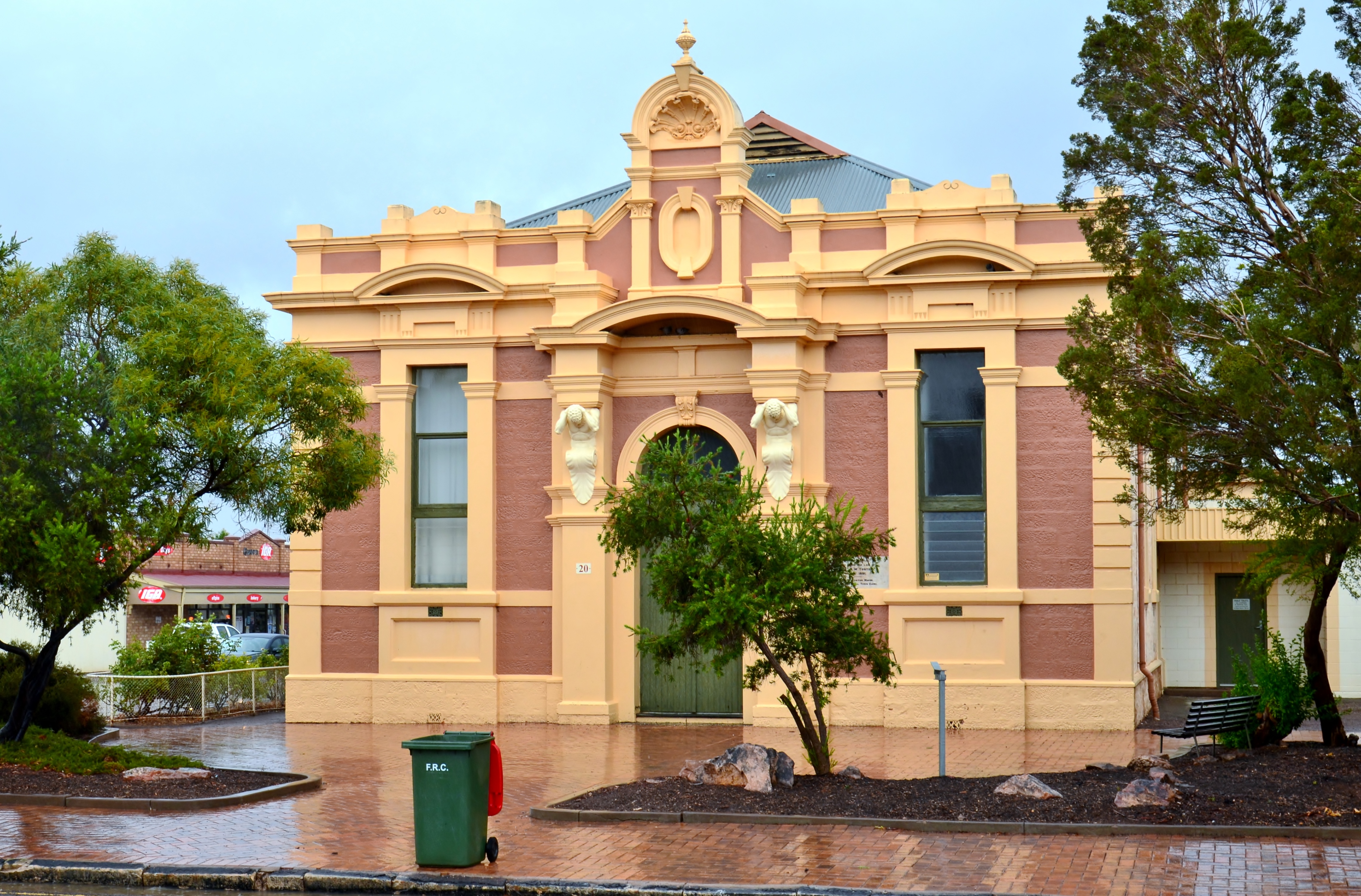
- The Town Hall in 2017
- Interactive map of Quorn Town Hall
- Location: 20 Railway Terrace; Quorn SA 5433
- Coordinates: 32°20′44″S 138°02′30″E
- Built: 1891; 135 years ago
- Architect: F. W. Dancker
- Governing body: Flinders Ranges Council

South Australian Heritage Register
- Type: State Heritage Place
- Designated: 12 January 1984
- Reference no.: 16348

The Quorn Town Hall is a heritage-listed former town hall at 20 Railway Terrace, Quorn, South Australia. It was added to the South Australian Heritage Register on 12 January 1984; it is also listed on the Register of the National Estate.

It was built by the Corporate Town of Quorn in 1891 to a design of Adelaide architect F. W. Dancker, and erected by Port Augusta contractors Moran Bros. The hall had dimensions of 68 ft by 40 ft, and 20 ft high. The foundation stone was laid on 7 February that year by the wife of mayor Richard Foster; at that time, it had cost £854 10s., and was expected to run to £1,000 for the building itself, with another £350 to fit out and furnish the hall. An acetylene gas lighting system was installed in 1904. In that year, the building contained the main hall, an office shared between the Quorn council and the District Council of Kanyaka, a public reading room and library, and a room for the Institute Committee.

By 1910, concerns were being raised about the hall being inadequate for the needs of the town, as it repeatedly proved too small for events held there. Councillor Hudson, in that year, stated that "the lodge room was not large enough to swing a cat in, the institute was too small, as was also the stage and body of the hall, they had no room for holding small meetings in, and the lack of dressing rooms made Quorn a laughing-stock to more up-to-date towns". The council struggled at the time to find the funds for necessary extensions, while acknowledging their necessity. A cinema was conducted in the hall in the years prior to World War II.

Both councils vacated the building by the 1950s, the Quorn council building a new chamber in Seventh Street (the modern Flinders Ranges Council building) in 1953, and the Kanyaka council converting a house in Eighth Street for their office; however, it remained in use as a community hall. Several additions were made during the twentieth century, and the building was remodelled in 1978, with the stage removed to enlarge the hall.

In 2016, it continues in use as a hall, and houses a bar in the former ladies' rest room, council archives in the former library reading room, and a supper room in the former council offices.
