= Pirie–Torrens corridor =

- Location within South Australia

Location
- Country: Australia
- State: South Australia
- Region: Far North

Physical characteristics
- Source: Lake Torrens
  - coordinates: 31°56′27.7″S 137°46′15.5″E
  - elevation: 30 m (98 ft)
- Mouth: Spencer Gulf
  - location: Emeroo
  - coordinates: 32°24′15.6″S 137°45′16.2″E
  - elevation: 0 m (0 ft)
- Length: 59 km (37 mi)
- Discharge
  - location: Port Augusta
  - average: 0.5 m^{3}/s (18 cu ft/s)

Basin features
- Tributaries
  - right: Sandy Creek

The Pirie–Torrens corridor is an approximately 59 km (37 mi) long intermittent watercourse that serves as the only natural outlet of Lake Torrens, a large normally endorheic salt lake in central South Australia.

Only on two recorded occasions — in 1836, and again in March 1989 — has Lake Torrens filled high enough to flow out through the corridor to its outlet at the head of the Spencer Gulf. The corridor likely flowed in 1897.
