= Acacia symonii =

Symon's wattle

Conservation status
- Vulnerable (IUCN 3.1)

Scientific classification
- Kingdom: Plantae
- Clade: Tracheophytes
- Clade: Angiosperms
- Clade: Eudicots
- Clade: Rosids
- Order: Fabales
- Family: Fabaceae
- Subfamily: Caesalpinioideae
- Clade: Mimosoid clade
- Genus: Acacia
- Species: A. symonii

Binomial name
- Acacia symonii Whibley
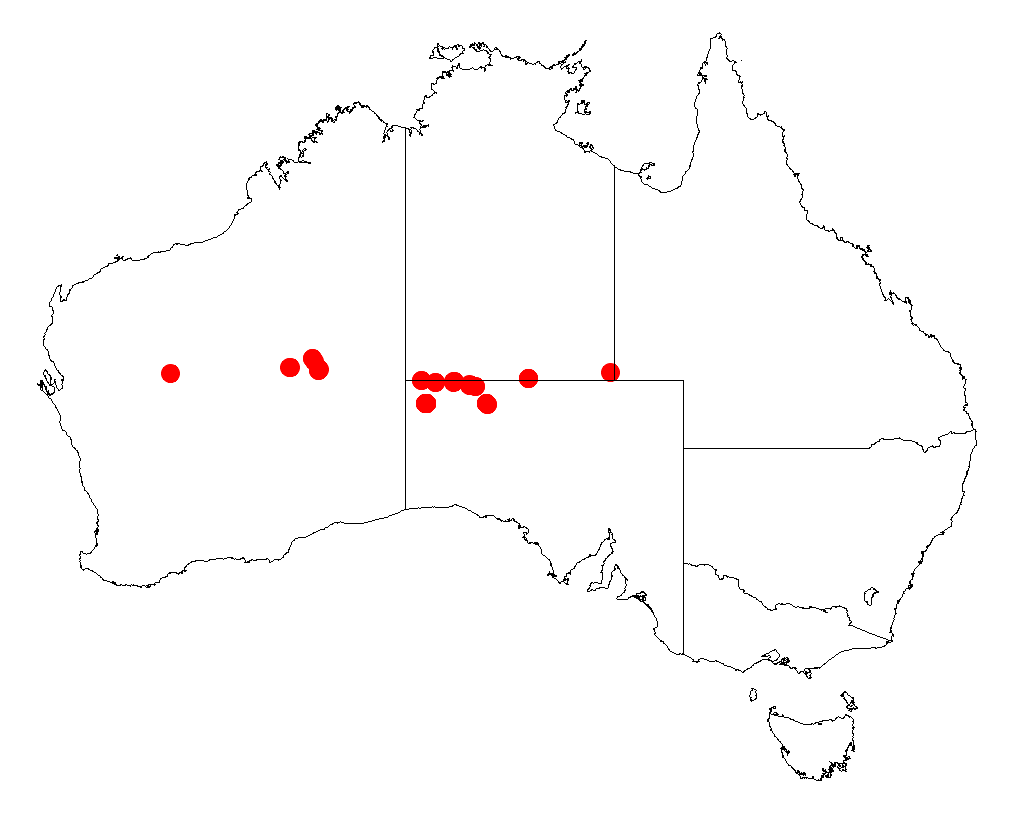
- Occurrence data from AVH

Species of plant

Acacia symonii, also known commonly as Symon's wattle, is a tree or shrub belonging to the genus Acacia and the subgenus Juliflorae that is endemic to parts of arid central Australia.

== Description ==
The tree or shrub typically grows to a height of 2 to 4 metres (7 to 13 ft) but can be as tall as 8 m (26 ft) and often has a bushy crown. The branchlets are usually glabrous but can have small hairs at the ribbed and resinous apices. Like most species of Acacia it has phyllodes rather than true leaves. The grey-green and erect phyllodes have a linear shape and can be straight or incurved slightly. They have a length of 8 to 14 cm (3.1 to 5.5 in) and a width of 1.5 to 3 mm (0.059 to 0.118 in) with three nerves per face with the central nerve being most prominent. It blooms from May to September producing yellow flowers. The simple inflorescences usually occur singly in the axils with cylindrical flower-spikes that have a length of 11 to 15 mm (0.43 to 0.59 in) and a diameter of around 4 mm (0.16 in). Following flowering brown seed pods from with a linear shape that have a length of around 70 mm (2.8 in) and a width of around 3 mm (0.12 in). The pods can be straight or slightly curved and mostly flat but are raised over and constricted between the seeds. The shiny seeds have a light brown colour and are about 3 mm (0.12 in) in length and 1.5 mm (0.059 in) wide.

== Taxonomy ==
The species was first formally described by the botanist D.J.Whibley in 1980 as published in the Journal of the Adelaide Botanic Gardens. It was reclassified as Racosperma symonii by Leslie Pedley in 2003 and then transferred back genus Acacia in 2006. The specific epithet honours the South Australian botanist D. E. Symon, who collected the type specimen.

== Distribution ==
It is native to an area in northern South Australia, southern parts of the Northern Territory and the central Goldfields region of Western Australia where it has a scattered disjunct distribution. It is often situated on low rocky ranges and growing in rocky red soils. In Western Australia it is found from north of Wiluna in the west with a range that extends through the Gibson Desert into South Australia. In South Australia the species is known only from western parts of the far north region in the Everard Ranges and the Birksgate Range from around Mount Lindsay.

== See also ==
- List of Acacia species
