= Wilkatana Station =

Coordinates: 32°11′50″S 137°52′28″E

Location in South Australia

Wilkatana Station is a sheep and cattle station in the Australian state of South Australia located north of the regional city of Port Augusta and south of Lake Torrens. It covers an area of 458 square kilometres (177 sq mi) which is located within the gazetted localities of Wilkatana Station in the west and Yarrah in the east.

The station consists of an arid plain between the Flinders Ranges and Lake Torrens, and exhibits some salt flats.

The traditional owners of the area are the Barngarla people.

In April 2013, the land occupying the appropriate western half of the Wilkatana Station was gazetted by the Government of South Australia as a locality under the name Wilkatana Station.

== See also ==
- List of ranches and stations
