= Barndioota, South Australia =

Barndioota
- Town
- Coordinates: 31°55′31″S 138°10′37″E
- Country: Australia
- State: South Australia
- Region: Far North
- LGA: Flinders Ranges Council
- Established: April 1883 (town); 25 November 1999 (locality)

Government
  - State electorate: Giles
  - Federal division: Grey

Population
  - Total: 6 (SAL 2021)
- Time zone: UTC+9:30 (ACST)
  - Summer (DST): UTC+10:30 (ACST)
- Postcode: 5434
- County: Blachford
- Mean max temp: 25.3 °C (77.5 °F)
- Mean min temp: 10.7 °C (51.3 °F)
- Annual rainfall: 307.2 mm (12.09 in)
Localities around Barndioota
Lake Torrens Station	Flinders Ranges	Flinders Ranges
Wallerberdina	Barndioota	Hawker
Yadlamalka, Yarrah	Kanyaka	Kanyaka

Barndioota is a locality and former town in the southern Flinders Ranges west of Hawker. The bounded locality of Barndioota which corresponds to the cadastral Hundred of Barndioota, also includes the former town of Hookina and the site of the ceased Government Town of Barndioota which was surveyed in 1883 and declared ceased to exist in 1929.

The traditional owners of the area are the Adnyamathanha peoples.

Mount Eyre which is located in the northern part of the locality was "the northernmost point of Eyre's 1839 expedition and named by Governor Gawler on 11 July 1839."

In April 2016, Wallerberdina Station in Barndioota was proposed as a possible site for a government-owned nuclear waste storage facility. The proposal met opposition from locals, Aboriginal people and environmental groups. A decision on this is not expected soon.
