= District Council of Kanyaka-Quorn =

Coordinates: 32°20′44″S 138°02′30″E

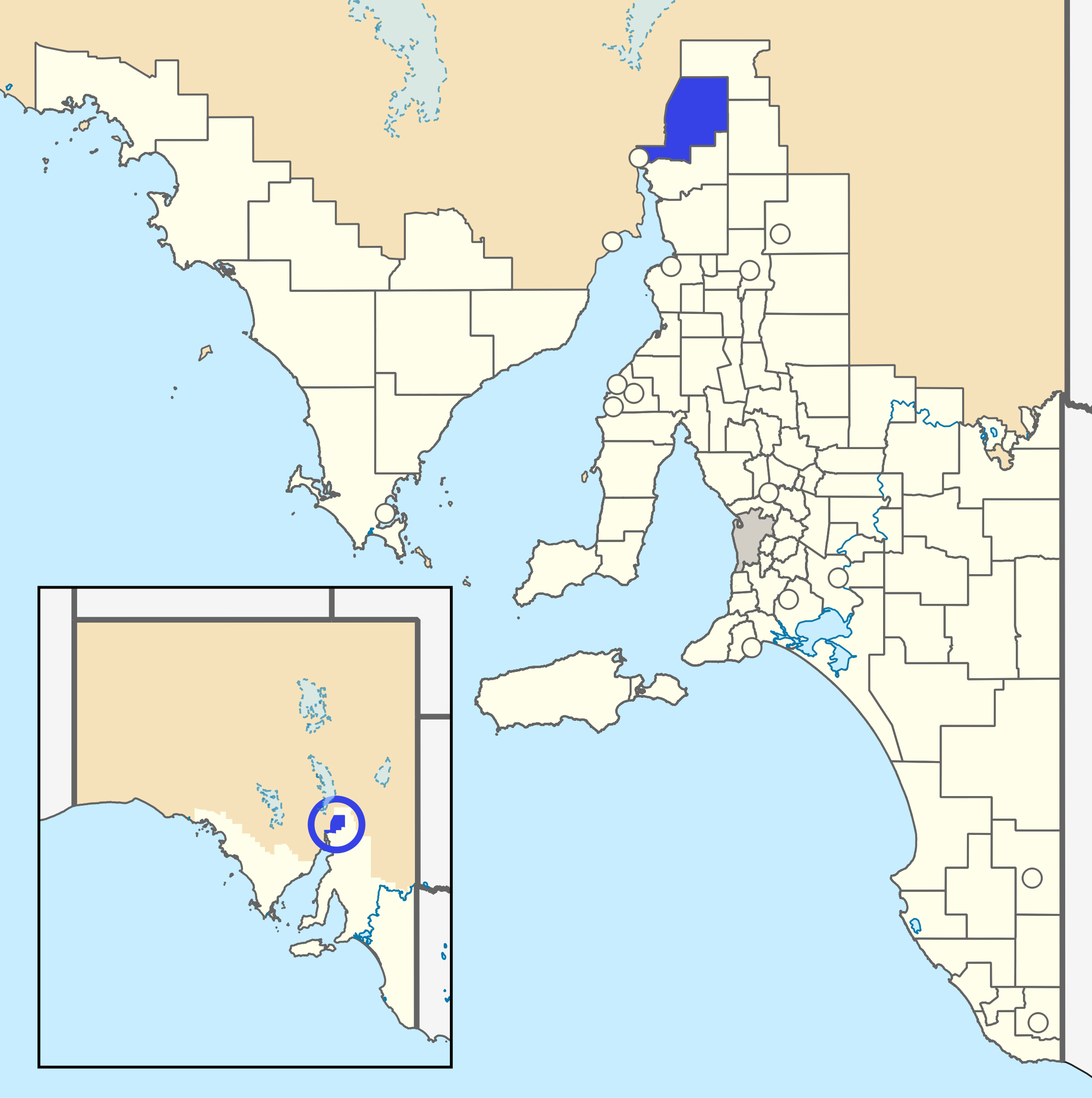
The District Council of Kanyaka-Quorn as it was in 1970 (blue)

The District Council of Kanyaka-Quorn was a local government area in South Australia that existed from 1969 to 1997.

The Council came into existence on 1 April 1969 following the merger of the Corporate Town of Quorn with the surrounding District Council of Kanyaka. It operated out of the former Quorn council's offices.

In 1983, the council published a book commemorating 100 years of local government in the district.

The Council amalgamated with the District Council of Hawker to form the Flinders Ranges Council on 1 January 1997, which continues to meet out of its former offices.

== Mayors of Kanyaka-Quorn ==
- John Denton French (1969-1975)
- Frank Jesse Flower (1975-1979)
- Roy James Deakin (1979-?)
