= Mount Desire Dyke =

Coordinates: 31°45′16″S 138°34′00″E

Mount Desire Dyke is designated place of geological significance. It is located 16 km (9.9 mi) north-east of Hawker in South Australia, on the edge of the Flinders Ranges. The dyke (or dike) is a rock structure where mobile material, being a breccia of rock salt and rubble (as in 'salt diapirs') has intruded into cracks in folded Adelaidean sediments in the geological past

The site was added to the South Australian Heritage Register on 30 March 1998. Its significance is described as follows:

This site contains a number of features of considerable importance to research and debate concerning the nature and origin of the Mt Desire Dyke and other diapirs of the Flinders Ranges, including: typical dolomitic-vanished evaporite breccia and dolostone/metasediment xenoclasts (to km in size) of probable Willouran origin; sharp irregular and distinctive contacts with early Cambrian units such as the Mernmerna Formation, Oraparinna Shale, and Wilkawillina Limestones, including a particularly important apophysis interpreted as an intrusive re-entrant; and significant brecciation in, and metamorphic incongruence between, the material of the dyke and the adjacent Cambrian limestones.

== See also ==
- Geology of South Australia
