= Eurelia (disambiguation) =

Eurelia is a town and locality in the Australian state of South Australia.

Eurelia may also refer to the following:

- Hundred of Eurelia, a cadastral unit in South Australia
- District Council of Eurelia, former local government in South Australia
- SS Eurelia, a ship - refer Walsh Island Dockyard and Engineering Works
