= Pedirka Desert =

Desert in central Australia

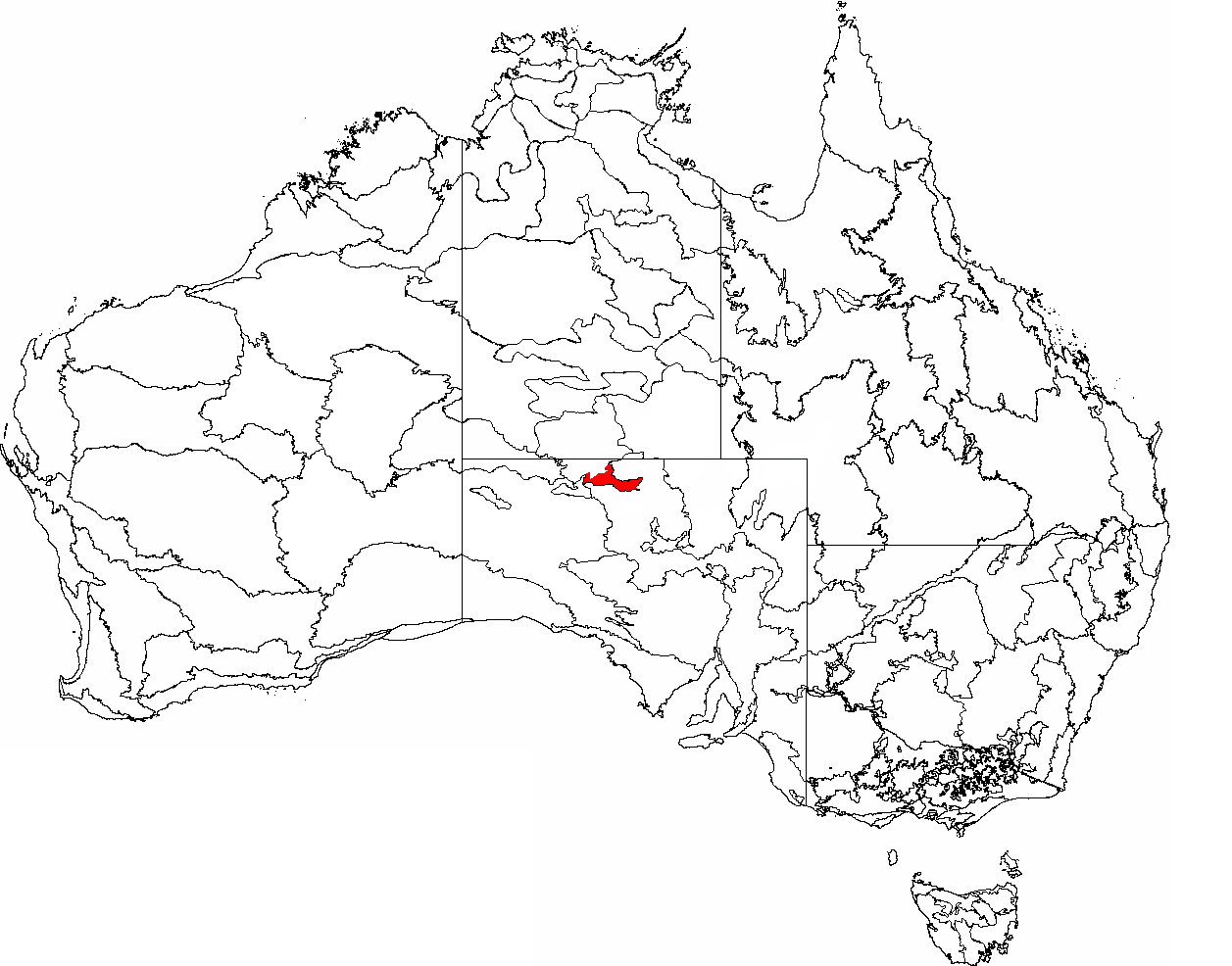
- The IBRA regions, with Pedirka Desert in red
- Area: 1,250 km^{2} (480 mi^{2})

Geography
- Country: Australia
- State: South Australia
- Region: Far North
- Coordinates: 26.9°S 134.9°E

The Pedirka Desert is a small Australian desert, about 100 kilometres (62 mi) north-west of Oodnadatta and 250 kilometres (160 mi) north-east of Coober Pedy in South Australia. Mount Dare and Witjira National Park are just to the north.

The desert is relatively small, occupying about 1,250 square kilometres (480 sq mi).

Pedirka Desert belongs to the Finke bioregion. The sands are deep-red and it is vegetated by dense mulga woodlands. Dunes in the desert are low, eroded, widely spaced and positioned parallel to each other.

Although the land is not over-appealing to pastoralists, it is progressively being developed.

== See also ==
- Deserts of Australia
- List of deserts by area
