= William Jervois =

British Army general

Lieutenant-General Sir William Jervois GCMG CB FRS
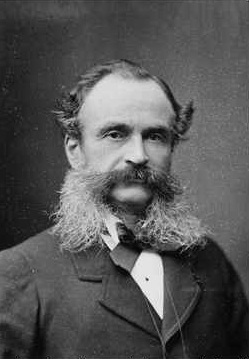
- Sir William Jervois, c. 1880

10th Governor of the Straits Settlements
- In office 8 May 1875 – 3 April 1877
- Preceded by: Andrew Clarke
- Succeeded by: Sir William Cleaver Francis Robinson

10th Governor of South Australia
- In office 2 October 1877 – 9 January 1883
- Monarch: Queen Victoria
- Premier: James Boucaut (1877–78); William Morgan (1878–81); John Cox Bray (1881–83)
- Preceded by: Sir Anthony Musgrave
- Succeeded by: Sir William Cleaver Francis Robinson

10th Governor of New Zealand
- In office 20 January 1883 – 23 March 1889
- Monarch: Victoria
- Premier: Frederick Whitaker; Harry Atkinson; Robert Stout
- Preceded by: The Baron Stanmore
- Succeeded by: The Earl of Onslow

Personal details
- Born: 10 September 1821 Cowes, Isle of Wight, England
- Died: 17 August 1897 (aged 75) Hampshire, England
- Civilian awards: Knight Grand Cross of the Order of St Michael and St George

Military service
- Allegiance: United Kingdom
- Branch: Board of Ordnance; British Army
- Service years: 1839–1882
- Rank: Lieutenant-General
- Unit: Corps of Royal Engineers
- Campaigns: Seventh Xhosa War, 1846–1847
- Military awards: Companion of the Order of the Bath

Lieutenant-General Sir William Francis Drummond Jervois GCMG CB FRS (10 September 1821 – 17 August 1897) was a British military engineer and diplomat. After joining the British Army in 1839, he saw service, as a second captain, in South Africa. In 1858, as a major, he was appointed Secretary of a Royal Commission set up to examine the state and efficiency of British land-based fortifications against naval attack; and this led to further work in Canada and South Australia. From 1875 to 1888 he was, consecutively, Governor of the Straits Settlements, Governor of South Australia and Governor of New Zealand.

== Early life ==
Born on 10 September 1821 in Cowes in the Isle of Wight, Jervois was the son of General William Jervois (pronounced "Jarvis"), and his wife Elizabeth Jervois (née Maitland). From a military family of Huguenot descent, he was educated at Dr. Burney's Academy, Gosport, before entering the Royal Military Academy, Woolwich.

== Military service ==
Upon graduating from Woolwich, Jervois was commissioned as a second lieutenant in the Corps of Royal Engineers in March 1839. From then until 1841, Jervois was trained at the School of Military Engineering at Chatham. In 1842, having been promoted to lieutenant the year before, Jervois was sent to South Africa where he served as a brigade major. As a second captain he saw service in the 7th Xhosa War, 1846–1847 during which he drew military sketches of British Kaffraria (now part of the Eastern Cape Province) in South Africa.

Returning to Britain in 1848, he commanded a company of Sappers and Miners at Woolwich and then in June 1849 was ordered to Alderney with instructions to manage the construction of substantial fortifications. Following a visit by Queen Victoria and Prince Albert to inspect the progress of the fortifications in 1854, he was promoted to the rank of major. Having been refused permission to go to the Crimea he returned to London in January 1855, he became the Commanding Royal Engineer (Major) for the London District and Assistant Inspector-General of Fortifications in April the following year. Jervois became Secretary of a Royal Commission set up on 20 August 1859 to examine the state and efficiency of British land-based fortifications against naval attack. It was specifically tasked to consider Portsmouth, Spithead, the Isle of Wight, Plymouth, Portland, Pembroke Dock, Dover, Chatham and the Medway. The commission's report was published on 7 February 1860. Amongst other things, it proposed several options for a ring of defences around London, none of which were adopted, although elements were used in the later London Defence Scheme. Jervois went on to oversee the design of the resulting fortifications that became known as the Palmerston Forts.

Promotion to lieutenant colonel came in 1861, and in 1864 and 1865, he was sent to Canada to review its fortifications and at the conclusion of his inspection he submitted what became a politically controversial report that stated that the Great Lakes and Upper Canada were not defensible. He then lectured about iron fortifications, and inspected and provided advice regarding the defences of various British colonies including Gibraltar and the Andaman Islands. He was promoted to colonel in 1867. In 1871 he was sent to India; and then worked on the defences of Cork harbour, which were completed in 1874.

Following the withdrawal of British garrison troops from Australia in 1870, Jervois and Lieutenant Colonel Peter Scratchley were commissioned by a group of colonies to advise on defence matters. They inspected each colony's defences and produced the Jervois-Scratchley reports of 1877 and 1878. These emphasised the importance of shore-based fortifications to defend against naval attack and also led to the establishment of local infantry and artillery units. In the 1880s many of the reports' recommendations were implemented by the various colonial governments and they went on to form the basis of defence planning in Australia and New Zealand until Federation. Jervois was raised to the rank of major general in 1877; he received a final promotion to lieutenant general in 1882.

== Diplomatic career ==
=== Governor of the Straits Settlements ===
In April 1875, Jervois was appointed the Governor of the Straits Settlements, a British dependency which included Penang, Malacca and Singapore. He took office in Singapore on 8 May 1875, and served until 3 April 1877. Decisions he made during his tenure cemented Britain's foothold on the Malay peninsula; he was instrumental in the formation of a local militia and the quelling of a Malay uprising. Although distrustful of Malays, he was sympathetic to the Chinese and would later bolster public support for oriental immigration during his time as Governor of South Australia.

=== Governor of South Australia ===
During an 1877 inspection of Australian maritime defences, Jervois was appointed Governor of South Australia. He was given notice of his "promotion" while in Melbourne in June, although the true reason for his reassignment was that the Colonial Office disliked his interference on the Malay mainland. Jervois arrived in South Australia on HMS Sapphire on 2 October 1877.

Jervois arrived in the colony during a time of political crisis. Later in October, the Colton Ministry resigned over a disagreement with the Legislative Council about the new Parliamentary buildings. Jervois resisted the pressure to dissolve parliament, and James Boucaut became Premier. Jervois's term also coincided with unusually good rainfall and a massive agricultural expansion, including his own efforts to establish an irrigation scheme on the Murray River. He laid the foundation stones of the University of Adelaide, the Institute and the Art Gallery, and commissioned a new vice-regal summer residence at Marble Hill.

=== Governor of New Zealand ===
Jervois then served as Governor of New Zealand from 1883 to 1888. In this role, Jervois provided advice on harbour defence, guided the colonial government on Imperial matters, was active in the country's social life, and worked to promote equality. He officiated at the opening of Auckland University College in 1883, declaring that it would be accessible to all New Zealanders, and recognised the service of nurses in the Zululand conflict, awarding a Royal Red Cross to a New Zealand woman for the first time. He also engaged with the Maori leadership. He also served as president of the New Zealand Institute and patronised many sporting institutions, including the New Zealand Amateur Rowing Association.

== Later life ==
At the conclusion of his term as governor-general in New Zealand, Jervois returned to England in 1889. The following year, he was appointed to serve on the Stanhope Commission, which again reviewed the state of Britain's fortifications. He returned to New Zealand briefly in 1892, before being appointed the colonel commandant of the Corps of Royal Engineers the following year.

His wife, Lucy, with whom he had had three daughters and two sons since their marriage in 1850, died in 1895. Jervois died on 17 August 1897, at the age of 75, as a result of injuries sustained in a carriage accident, and was buried at Virginia Water, Surrey.

== Honours ==
Jervois received numerous honours for his military and diplomatic service. He was invested Companion of the Order of the Bath in 1863, Knight Commander of the Order of St Michael and St George in 1874, and Knight Grand Cross of the Order of St Michael and St George in 1888. He was elected a Fellow of the Royal Society in 1888. Several streets were also named after him, including: Jervois Quay in Wellington and Jervois Street in Christchurch, and Jervois Close and Jervois Road in Singapore. In Australia, a bridge in Adelaide, a mine and Jervois, a locality on the Murray River in South Australia were named for him. Jervois Glacier in New Zealand's Fiordland National Park also bears his name.

== See also ==
- Corresp: Actions of Perak Expeditionary Force post-murder of Birch
- Governor of Penang
- Simmonston
- Amyton, South Australia
- Carrieton
- Hammond, South Australia

Government offices
Preceded by Andrew Clarke	Governor of the Straits Settlements; 1875–1877	Succeeded by Sir William Robinson
Preceded by Sir Anthony Musgrave	Governor of South Australia; 1877–1883	Succeeded by Sir William Robinson
Preceded by The Lord Stanmore	Governor of New Zealand; 1883–1889	Succeeded by The Earl of Onslow
