= Lake Torrens Station =

Coordinates: 31.657°S 137.971°E

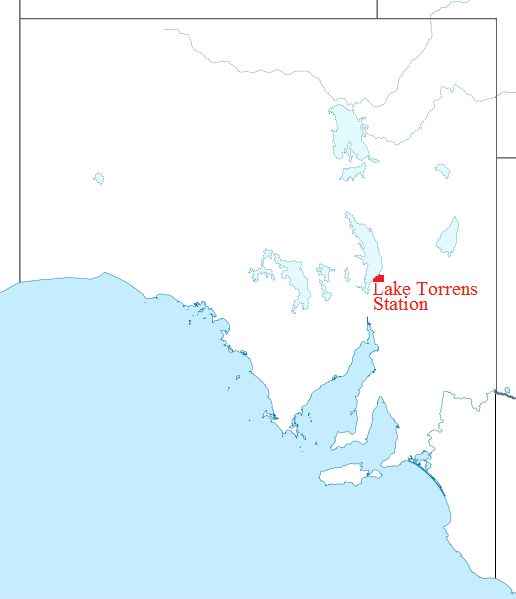
Map showing Lake Torrens Station.

Lake Torrens Station is a rural locality in central South Australia. Lake Torrens Station is located between the Lake Torrens foreshore and The Ghan railway line.

The area is part of an arid plain between the Flinders Ranges and Lake Torrens, and the post code is 5713.

The traditional owners of the area are probably the Barngarla people, but the property is close to the traditional lands of the Kuyani and Adnyamathanha peoples as well.

In April 2016 a nuclear waste facility was proposed for the adjoining locality of Barndioota. The facility, to hold materials classified as "low level radioactive waste" and temporarily store "intermediate level radioactive waste" above ground for 92 years, has been opposed by local environmental groups and Aboriginal people. A decision is not expected in the near future.
