= Lake Torrens =

Salt lake in South Australia

Lake Torrens (Ngarndamukia)
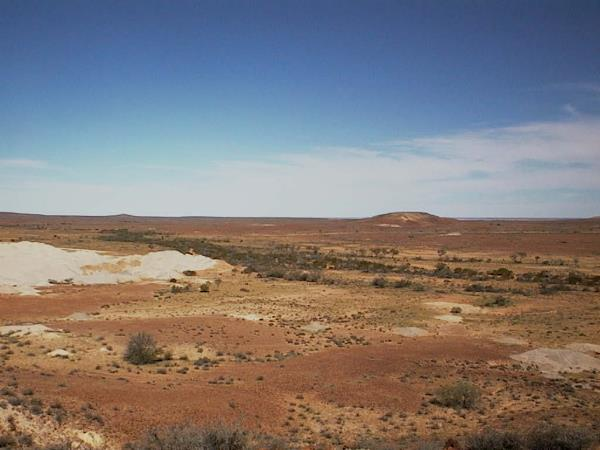
- Stuart Creek with Lake Torrens in the background

- Location in South Australia
- Location: South Australia
- Coordinates: 31°02′40″S 137°51′35″E
- Type: Salt lake
- Primary outflows: Pirie–Torrens corridor
- Basin countries: Australia
- Designation: Lake Torrens National Park
- Max. length: 250 km (160 mi)
- Max. width: 30 km (19 mi)
- Surface area: 5,745 km^{2} (2,218 sq mi)
- Max. depth: 1 m (3.3 ft)
- Surface elevation: 30 m (98 ft)

Lake Torrens (Kuyani: Ngarndamukia) is a large ephemeral, normally endorheic salt lake in central South Australia. After sufficiently extreme rainfall events, the lake flows out through the Pirie-Torrens corridor to the Spencer Gulf.

Islands on the lake include Andamooka Island and Murdie Island, both near the western shore; Trimmer Inlet runs between Andamooka Island and the shore, and Carrapateena Arm is an arm extending westwards south of Murdie Island.

== Description ==
Lake Torrens lies between the Arcoona Plateau to the west and the Flinders Ranges to the east, about 65 kilometres (40 mi) north of Port Augusta and about 345 kilometres (214 mi) north of the Adelaide city centre. The lake is approximately 30 metres (98 ft) above sea level, with a maximum depth of 1 m. It is located within the boundaries of Lake Torrens National Park.

Lake Torrens stretches approximately 250 kilometres (155 mi) in length and 30 kilometres (19 mi) in average width. It is Australia's second largest lake when filled with water and encompasses an area of 5,745 square kilometres (2,218 sq mi).

Usually the Lake Torrens catchment is an endorheic basin, having no outflow of water to the ocean.

Andamooka Island is the largest of several islands, lying along the western shore. It is a pastoral property, but an important area for birds such as the red-capped plover and cinnamon quail-thrush, and other islands host banded stilts and others. Murdie Island lies just south of Andamooka, its name of either Barngarla or Kuyani origin and identified in the 1850s. Its name, along with Carrapateena, reflect "the earliest known and identifiable cultural associations to Lake Torrens", according to a 2016 court judgement. Other geographic features include Carrapateena Inlet (also called Carrapateena Arm) and Trimmer Inlet.

== History ==
Approximately 35,000 years ago, the lake water was fresh to brackish, but has become increasingly saline since.

In a 2016 case in the Supreme Court of South Australia, the lake was noted as a sacred site and ownership was contested by three claimant groups: the Kokatha, Adnyamathanha/Kuyani and Barngarla peoples. The court ruled that none of the groups would be awarded native title to the area, as although all three groups had 'significant and credible spiritual connection to parts of Lake Torrens' it was not possible to 'prioritise one set of spiritual beliefs over the other'. In 2020, mine exploration licences covered part of the lake with prospecting for minerals underway The first European to see the lake was Edward Eyre in 1839, who spotted the salt bed from Mount Arden at the head of the Spencer Gulf.

Eyre named the lake after Colonel Robert Torrens who was one of the founders of the colony of South Australia. However the Kuyani people had long called the lake Ngarndamukia, meaning "shower of rain".

The lake filled in 1897 and again in April 1989. The 1989 filling resulted in the lake outflowing through the Pirie-Torrens corridor to the Spencer Gulf, suggesting it likely did so in 1897 as well. It has a thin salt crust with red-brown clays beneath, which are soft and boggy. The area around the lake is sparsely vegetated with samphire, saltbush and bluebush.

In April 2013, the full extent of Lake Torrens was gazetted by the Government of South Australia as a locality with the name Lake Torrens.

== Protected area status ==
=== South Australian government ===
The full extent of Lake Torrens has been protected as a national park under the National Parks and Wildlife Act 1972 since 1991.

=== Non-statutory arrangements ===
Lake Torrens is part of an area known as the Inland Saline Lakes which has been listed in the Directory of Important Wetlands in Australia since at least 1995.

Lake Torrens has been identified by BirdLife International as an Important Bird Area known as the Lake Torrens Important Bird Area (IBA) because it supported up to 100,000 breeding banded stilts during the major filling event of 1989. It may occasionally support over 1% of the world population of red-capped plovers. Cinnamon quail-thrushes are also common in the IBA.

== Exploratory drilling for minerals ==
In April 2017 Kelaray, a subsidiary of mining company Argonaut Resources, secured native title permission to do exploratory drilling for iron, copper and gold under the lake, intending to work with traditional owners to “preserve and protect” important sites. The area was drilled in 2007 to 2008 without obtaining permission of the Kokatha people, who then held native title (see History, above). In February 2018, the South Australian Environment, Resources and Development (ERD) Court granted authority to enter and undertake mining operations (exploration) within those parts of the western area of the lake defined in an application by Argonaut. Some drilling was done in 2019, but was paused pending a technical review relating to the aquifer below the lake. In September 2020, representatives of the local Kuyani and Kokatha people raised concerns about further drilling proposals.

In January 2021, the state government under Steven Marshall granted permission to Kelaray to conduct drilling on the lake, over an area including Murdie Island, part of Andamooka Island, and part of Carrapateena Arm, after they had made an application under Section 23 of the Aboriginal Heritage Act 1988, "to damage, disturb or interfere with any Aboriginal sites, objects or remains". Mitigation strategies to protect the environment include purpose-built mats which would be used on the lake's surface to "protect the salt crust" from vehicles travelling over it, and the company intends to consult regularly with Aboriginal representatives. However Kuyani woman Regina McKenzie expressed concerns that her people were not consulted and no cultural assessments were made. The work, scheduled to begin in 2021, would "target iron oxide copper-gold (IOCG) copper mineralisation", similar to mines at Olympic Dam and Carrapateena mines. It has been called the Murdie project in Argonaut's documentation.

Drilling was set to start from 15 March 2021, despite recommendations against doing so being provided to Marshall (who is also Aboriginal Affairs minister) by the state-government-appointed Aboriginal Affairs and Reconciliation and the State Aboriginal Heritage Committee (SAHC) and Aboriginal Affairs and Reconciliation (part of the Department of the Premier and Cabinet). 20 semi-trailer trucks delivered accommodation units and equipment to Murdie Island in preparation. In the same week, the Barngarla Determination Aboriginal Corporation launched legal action to put a stop to the drilling, on the grounds that it is "one of the most significant cultural sites in South Australia".

In August 2022, the Chief Justice of South Australia, Chris Kourakis, overturned Marshall's decision, citing concerns that Kelaray's heritage plan and procedures would "substantially detract" from the state’s Aboriginal heritage laws.

== See also ==
- Lake Eyre
- List of lakes of Australia § South Australia
- Pirie–Torrens corridor
