= Hawker, South Australia =

Hawker
- Town
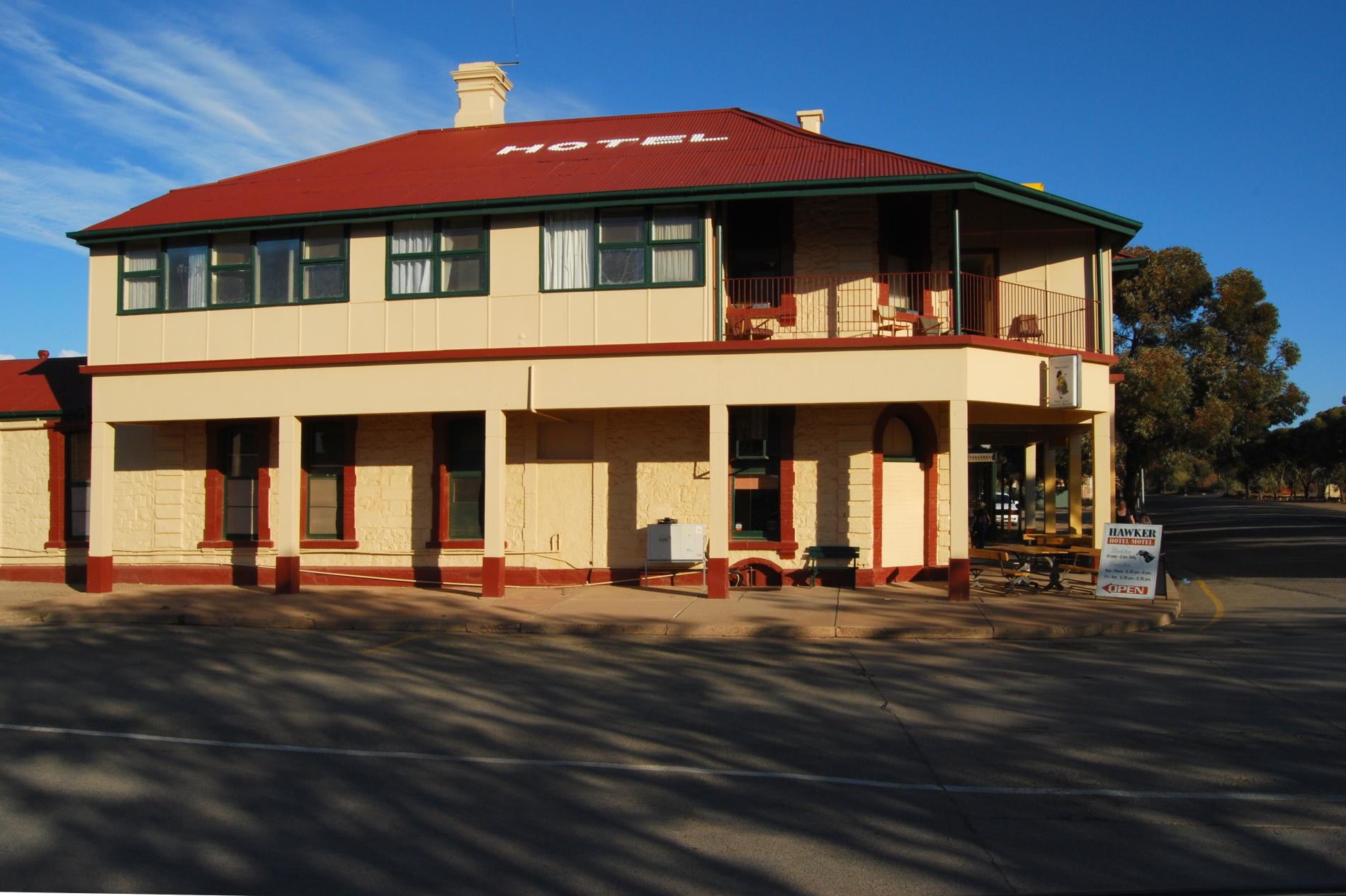
- Hawker Hotel-Motel

- Coordinates: 31°53′28″S 138°25′20″E
- Country: Australia
- State: South Australia
- Region: Far North
- LGA: Flinders Ranges Council
- Location: 365 km (227 mi) N of Adelaide
- Established: 1 July 1880 (town); 25 November 1999 (locality)

Government
  - State electorate: Giles
  - Federal division: Grey
- Elevation: 315 m (1,033 ft)

Population
  - Total: 226 (UCL 2021)
- Postcode: 5434
- County: Blachford; Hanson
- Mean max temp: 25.2 °C (77.4 °F)
- Mean min temp: 10.6 °C (51.1 °F)
- Annual rainfall: 308.6 mm (12.15 in)
Localities around Hawker
| Flinders Ranges | Flinders Ranges | Flinders Ranges |
| Barndioota | Hawker | Shaggy Ridge; Worumba |
| Kanyaka | Kanyaka; Cradock | Cradock |

Hawker is a town and a locality in the Flinders Ranges area of South Australia, 365 kilometres (227 mi) north of Adelaide. It is in the Flinders Ranges Council, the state Electoral district of Giles and the federal Division of Grey.

== History ==
The town was surveyed during March 1880 and was proclaimed on 1 July 1880. It was named after G. C. Hawker who was a member of the Parliament of South Australia for the years 1858–1865 and 1875–1883. The locality's boundaries were gazetted on 25 November 1999 and include the Government Towns of Wonoka, Hawker and Chapmanton. Portions of Hawker were added to the adjoining localities of Flinders Ranges and Shaggy Ridge on 26 November 2013.

Hawker was a thriving railway town from the 1880s until 1956 as it was on the Central Australia Railway, until the route was moved further west when the Marree railway line was opened.

=== Establishment and naming ===
The State Library of South Australia Place Names list gives this account of the naming of the town.

"Hawker – George Charles Hawker was born in London, in 1819, the second son of Admiral Edward Hawker and, after his arrival in South Australia in the Lysander in September 1840, ran sheep in the Nuriootpa district and, in 1841, established the 'Bungaree Run' with two brothers. Entering parliament in 1858, he became Speaker in 1860, returned to England in 1865 and, apart from a short return visit, remained there until 1874. Upon his return to the colony he re-entered the political arena in 1875, retiring in 1883.

Hawker Hill, west of Lake Frome, was named by John McDouall Stuart on 2 June 1859; Mount Hawker, South-West of Lake Eyre South, was named by John McDouall Stuart on 1 July 1861.

The town of Hawker was proclaimed on 1 July 1880 and its sale occasioned very spirited bidding particularly for 'blocks near the railway station favourably placed for hotels and shops': The supreme site was the large corner (Lot 470) on which the Royal Hotel (now Hawker Hotel) was erected later, and this brought the top price of £246. Lot 473 on which William Powell erected a hotel later named the 'Wonoka' brought £147. The storekeepers H. Gadd and G. Jackson paid, respectively, £72 (Lot 415) and £100 (Lot 391) for good sites facing the railway close to the station.

While most of Hawker remained simply pegged-out blocks of bluebush, the 'top end' of the town, where business activity was concentrated, must have been as animated as an ant colony. Hammering could be heard all day long for initially all of the buildings were of wood and iron. There was keen competition to be first with any business service to the public. Constantly teams of horses, bullocks, donkeys, and even camels converged upon, or radiated from, the town, raising the dust in that dry year of 1880."

=== Heritage listings ===
Hawker has a number of heritage-listed sites, including:

- 20 Cradock Road: St Philip and St James Catholic Church
- Hawker-Wilpena Road: Mount Desire Dyke
- Wonoka-Hawker Road: Hawker railway station
- 1885 Hawker Dam

== Economy ==
The main economic activities in the area are tourism and pastoral runs of sheep and increasingly cattle. Due to the arid environment, the stocking rates are low, at about one sheep per three to four hectares. Hawker is 55 kilometres (34 mi) south of Wilpena Pound, a unique natural dish-shaped range of hills popular with tourists, as well as the spectacular scenery of the Flinders Ranges.

== Tourism ==
In late May, Hawker Racing Club holds its annual Thoroughbred horse racing meeting, which includes the Hawker Cup and attracts many people from the surrounding area.

== Climate ==
Hawker has a semi-arid climate with hot summers and cool winters. Rainfall is very sparse throughout the year, but more reliable in the winter months.

Climate data for Hawker
| Month | Jan | Feb | Mar | Apr | May | Jun | Jul | Aug | Sep | Oct | Nov | Dec | Year |
|---|---|---|---|---|---|---|---|---|---|---|---|---|---|
| Record high °C (°F) | 46.8 (116.2) | 45.5 (113.9) | 41.5 (106.7) | 37.0 (98.6) | 30.0 (86.0) | 26.7 (80.1) | 26.9 (80.4) | 30.0 (86.0) | 36.3 (97.3) | 39.2 (102.6) | 44.5 (112.1) | 46.1 (115.0) | 46.8 (116.2) |
| Mean daily maximum °C (°F) | 34.3 (93.7) | 33.4 (92.1) | 30.2 (86.4) | 25.4 (77.7) | 20.0 (68.0) | 16.3 (61.3) | 16.0 (60.8) | 17.8 (64.0) | 21.8 (71.2) | 25.8 (78.4) | 29.4 (84.9) | 32.0 (89.6) | 25.2 (77.4) |
| Mean daily minimum °C (°F) | 18.1 (64.6) | 18.0 (64.4) | 15.0 (59.0) | 11.1 (52.0) | 7.2 (45.0) | 4.6 (40.3) | 3.7 (38.7) | 4.4 (39.9) | 6.9 (44.4) | 10.1 (50.2) | 13.6 (56.5) | 16.0 (60.8) | 10.7 (51.3) |
| Record low °C (°F) | 5.6 (42.1) | 9.0 (48.2) | 4.5 (40.1) | 0.9 (33.6) | −2.7 (27.1) | −4.5 (23.9) | −4.7 (23.5) | −5.5 (22.1) | −3.0 (26.6) | −0.2 (31.6) | 2.0 (35.6) | 6.2 (43.2) | −5.5 (22.1) |
| Average precipitation mm (inches) | 20.2 (0.80) | 20.3 (0.80) | 16.2 (0.64) | 19.8 (0.78) | 29.9 (1.18) | 37.5 (1.48) | 32.4 (1.28) | 31.1 (1.22) | 27.0 (1.06) | 24.8 (0.98) | 23.0 (0.91) | 21.9 (0.86) | 304.2 (11.98) |
| Average precipitation days | 2.8 | 2.6 | 2.6 | 3.4 | 5.5 | 7.3 | 7.7 | 7.2 | 5.5 | 5.1 | 4.1 | 3.6 | 57.4 |

== See also ==
- Hawker (disambiguation)
