= Flinders Ranges Council =

Coordinates: 32.35°S 138.033333°E

The Flinders Ranges Council
- Local government area
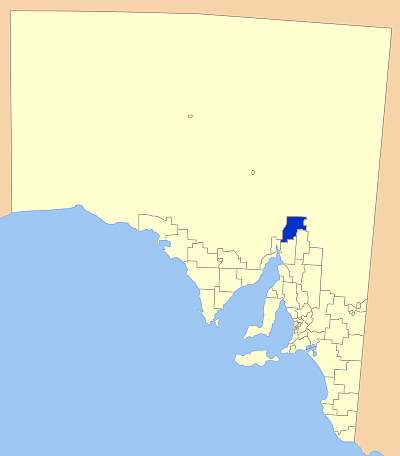
- Location of The Flinders Ranges Council

- Interactive map of The Flinders Ranges Council
- Country: Australia
- State: South Australia
- Region: Far North
- Established: 1 January 1997
- Council seat: Quorn

Government
  - Mayor: Ken Anderson
  - State electorate: Electoral district of Giles
  - Federal division: Division of Grey

Area
  - Total: 4,198 km^{2} (1,621 sq mi)

Population
  - Total: 1,646 (LGA 2021)
- Website: The Flinders Ranges Council
LGAs around The Flinders Ranges Council
Outback Communities Authority	Outback Communities Authority	Outback Communities Authority
Outback Communities Authority	The Flinders Ranges Council	Outback Communities Authority
City of Port Augusta	District Council of Mount Remarkable	District Council of Orroroo Carrieton

The Flinders Ranges Council is a local government area (LGA) located in the Flinders Ranges of South Australia.

The LGA is approximately 100 km from north to south, and 45 km from east to west, with a total area of 4,198 square kilometres.

The main towns within the council are Hawker and Quorn; it also includes the localities of Barndioota, Kanyaka and Stephenston, and part of Bruce, Cradock, Flinders Ranges, Moockra, Saltia, Shaggy Ridge, Wilmington and Yarrah.

It was created on 1 January 1997 following the merger of the District Council of Kanyaka-Quorn and the District Council of Hawker.

The LGA adjoins the following to the south - City of Port Augusta, District Council of Mount Remarkable and District Council of Orroroo Carrieton, while the remainder of the adjoining land is within the unincorporated area of South Australia, where municipal services are provided by the Outback Communities Authority.

The Flinders Ranges Council is entirely in the state electorate of Giles and the federal Division of Grey.

== Council ==
Ward	Councillor	Notes
Mayor	Ken Anderson	
Unsubdivided	Steven (Steve) Taylor	
Unsubdivided	Julian Hipwell	
Unsubdivided	Angus Searcy	
Unsubdivided	Patricia (Patsy) Reynolds	Deputy Mayor
Unsubdivided	David Hunter	
Unsubdivided	Ashley Parkinson	
Unsubdivided	Ian Carpenter	
Unsubdivided	Greg Flint	

The Flinders Ranges Council has a directly elected Mayor. The last Mayoral election was completed in November 2022 with Mayor Anderson, defeating the incumbent Mayor Flint with 426 votes to 307. Anderson was preceded by:

- 1997-2010: Max McHugh
- 2010-2020: Peter Slattery
- 2021-2022: Greg Flint

The current Chief Executive Officer of The Flinders Ranges Council is Sean Holden. He was preceded by:

- 1997-2002: D A Cearns
- 2002-2004: R D Walsh
- 2004-2009: L E Connors
- 2009-2019: C J Davies
- 2020-2023: E J Brown
