= Far North (South Australia) =

Very large region in the arid part of South Australia

- Region
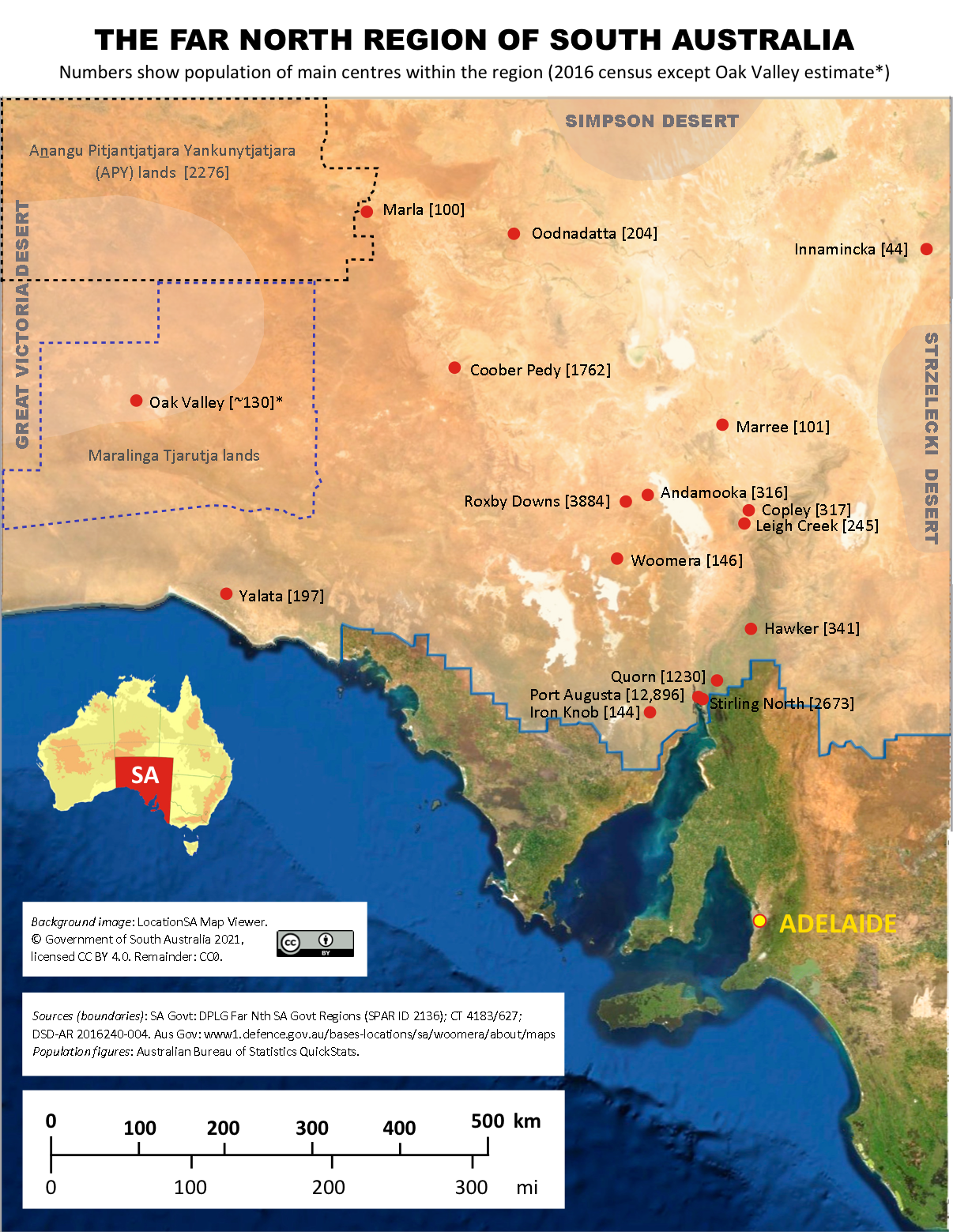
- South Australia's Far North region (north of the blue east–west border lines), with main settlements and their populations in 2016

- Coordinates: 29°S 136°E
- Country: Australia
- State: South Australia
- LGA: Anangu Pitjantjatjara Yankunytjatjara (APY) lands; Maralinga Tjarutja lands; Port Augusta; Flinders Ranges; Coober Pedy; Roxby Downs; Outback Communities Authority

Government
  - State electorate: Giles; Stuart
  - Federal division: Grey

Area
  - Total: 696,986 km^{2} (269,108 sq mi)

Population
  - Total: 27,727 (2016 census (Note: Comprises populations of places shown within Far North region on map (total 24,203) plus 3524 in Unincorporated South Australia, to whom the state government provides municipal services through the Outback Communities Authority.))
  - Density: 0.0397813/km^{2} (0.1030331/sq mi)
Regions around Far North
Western Australia	Northern Territory	Queensland
Eyre and Western; Western Australia	Far North	New South Wales
Eyre and Western	Eyre and Western; Yorke and Mid North; Murray Mallee	New South Wales
- Map of adjoining regions

The Far North is a region that covers about 70 per cent of the Australian state of South Australia. It extends across the entire width of the state – about 1200 kilometres (750 miles) – for approximately the northernmost 750 kilometres (470 miles). The state government defines the Far North region similarly, although it separately delineates the Maralinga Tjarutja Lands, the Yalata Aboriginal community and other unincorporated crown lands in the state's far west, which are officially considered part of the Eyre and Western region. Colloquially, South Australians regard anywhere north of Port Augusta as the Far North.

The Far North is by far the least populated region of South Australia.

== Wilderness and deserts ==
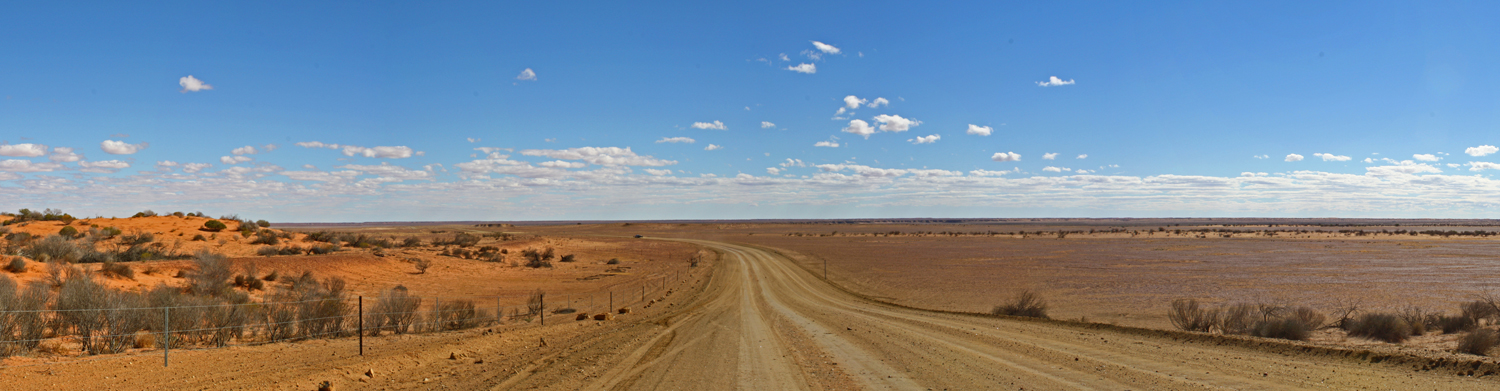
The arid terrain of the Oodnadatta Track is typical of much of the Far North region

The landscape comprises mainly rugged outback wilderness and desert, including some of the most arid parts of the continent, with a Köppen climate classification of BWh hot desert. In the north-east are the Simpson Desert, Tirari Desert, Painted Desert and Pedirka Desert. To the north and north-west is the Great Victoria Desert.

The Far North is also known as the Arid Lands as a more descriptive term than "desert".

== Governance ==
The Far North includes the following local government areas: Anangu Pitjantjatjara Yankunytjatjara (APY), City of Port Augusta, District Council of Coober Pedy, Flinders Ranges Council and Municipal Council of Roxby Downs. Since most of it lies within what is known as the unincorporated area, municipal services to communities outside of the foregoing local government areas are provided directly by the South Australian Government via the Outback Communities Authority. It is within the extent of the state electoral districts of Giles and Stuart, and at a national level the Division of Grey.

== Tourism ==
The region has abundant national parks and reserves and widely scattered tourist attractions and facilities. Experiences and attractions include farmstays on sheep stations, unique native flora and fauna, a museum and underground accommodation where opal is mined, natural springs, and vast landscapes of salt lakes, sandstone tablelands, and vividly coloured hills.

=== Permits ===
Permits are required to enter Aboriginal-owned land. As of 2023, a National Parks and Wildlife Service South Australia Desert Parks Pass was also needed to visit the Simpson Desert Conservation Park and Regional Reserve and east of Dalhousie Springs in Witjira National Park. (Note: The Desert Parks Pass includes unlimited vehicle entry and camping in another 5 areas.) A tourist pass was also required to enter the Woomera Prohibited Area.

Some significant roads in the area include the Stuart Highway from Port Augusta to Alice Springs, the Oodnadatta Track, and both the Birdsville Track and the Strzelecki Track to Queensland.

Travelling in outback South Australia can be very exciting. The scenery is breathtaking, the wildlife unique and the flora exquisite. It can also be deadly if you don't plan adequately. – Information provided by the Outback Communities Authority

== See also ==
- Regions of South Australia
- List of regions of Australia
