= Yalpara Conservation Park =

Protected area in South Australia

- IUCN category III (natural monument or feature)
- Location within South Australia
- Location: South Australia
- Nearest city: Orroroo
- Coordinates: 32°33′31″S 138°50′59″E
- Area: 43 ha (110 acres)
- Established: 10 June 1976
- Governing body: Department for Environment and Water

Yalpara Conservation Park is a protected area located in the Australian state of South Australia in the locality of Yalpara about 266 kilometres (165 mi) north of the state capital of Adelaide and about 30 kilometres (19 mi) north-east of Orroroo.

The conservation park occupies land in section 112 of the cadastral unit of the Hundred of Yalpara. It was proclaimed on 10 June 1976 under the National Parks and Wildlife Act 1972 in order to preserve “an example of rangeland country”. As of 2016, it covered an area of 43 hectares (110 acres).

In 1980, the conservation park was described as being on “relatively flat terrain”, as having vegetation consisting of “an open woodland of Eucalyptus socialis with Myoporum platycarpum over an open shrubland understorey of Atriplex, Kochia and numerous introduced species” and that it was in “a degraded state, having suffered heavy grazing”.

The conservation park is classified as an IUCN Category III protected area. It was listed on the now-defunct Register of the National Estate.

== See also ==
- Protected areas of South Australia
