= Hundred of Erskine =

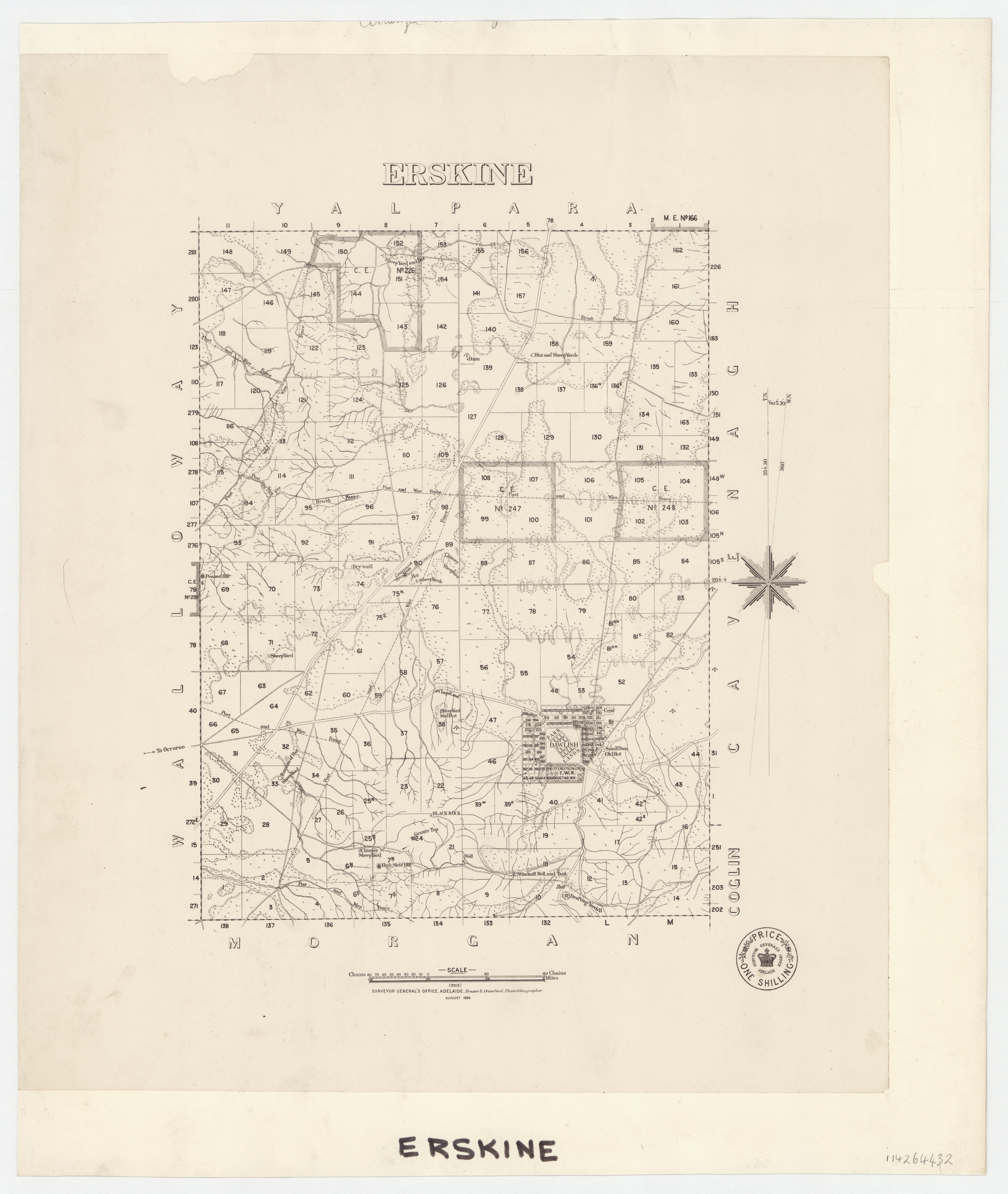
Hundred of Erskine

The Hundred of Erskine is a hundred in the County of Dalhousie, South Australia. The hundred was established 1876 but contains no townships. Once regarded as 'governmental wasteland', it has been settled by pastoralists for over 150 years.

The land in the hundred has been used to grow cattle and sheep, as well as cereal crops including wheat, barley and oats. The closest town to the hundred is Orroroo.

The Hundred of Erskine borders the Hundred of Walloway to the West, the Hundred of Yalpara to the North, the Hundred of Cavenagh and Hundred of Coglin to the East and the Hundred of Morgan to the South.

== History ==
The land in the hundred was first sold in 1879.

== Stories ==
There are a number of stories from the early settlers of the area.

1. Early settler James Craig Jr was sinking a well on his property with dynamite. The charge he used didn't go off, so Craig went to investigate. As he was descending into the well the charge exploded, propelling him 70ft into the air. He died later that day.

2. After a long day shearing, some shearers would find themselves at Patsy Nugents wine shanty near Dawlish. On one such evening, a young Irishman attempted to 'earmark' one of his companions. In an effort to dissuade him, Nugent threw a lantern towards him, which hit him in the end. The kerosene from the lamp spilled onto him, igniting and leaving him with severely burnt ears.

3. William Hanna, also known as Billy Bangham, was a well known farmhand from the area. One day a young calf fell into a well, and his employer James Pollard proceeded to lower him into the well to retrieve it. While lowering him, the rope snapped, leaving Hanna stranded. Pollard was headed to Orroroo to get a heavier cable from the blacksmith to retrieve him. While passing through a creek his horses were spooked, throwing him from the cart and leaving him unconscious. He was found later that day in the creek and was admitted to hospital. After 32 hours he came out of his coma, whereupon he sent a message to the blacksmith. Two men sped off in a Ford to rescue Hanna. Both Hanna and the calf were rescued from the well. Upon being rescued, Hanna pronounced "Behold, Pluto, King of the Underworld."

Stories such as these show the spirit of those early settlers and the trials that they went through.

== See also ==
- Dawlish, South Australia
- Erskine, South Australia
