= Black Rock Conservation Park =

Protected area in South Australia

- IUCN category III (natural monument or feature)
- Location within South Australia
- Location: South Australia
- Nearest city: Orroroo
- Coordinates: 32°41′25″S 138°48′33″E
- Area: 119 ha (290 acres)
- Established: 9 November 1972
- Governing body: Department for Environment and Water

Black Rock Conservation Park is a protected area located in the Australian state of South Australia in the locality of Erskine about 250 kilometres (160 mi) north of the state capital of Adelaide and about 25 kilometres (16 mi) east of Orroroo.

The conservation park occupies land in section 76 of the cadastral unit of the Hundred of Erskine on the south side of the Orroroo-Paratoo Road. It was proclaimed on 9 November 1972 under the National Parks and Wildlife Act 1972. As of 2016, it covered an area of 119 hectares (290 acres).

A statement of significance prepared in 1980 advises that it preserves "vegetation typical of the region" and that it contains "a diverse avifauna, including the most westerly record of the black-backed wren, now considered to be a variant of the splendid wren".

The conservation park was described in 1980 as being “located on the outwash from Black Rock, the highest point in the vicinity”, as having a “dominant vegetation consists of a low woodland of Casuarina cristata and Myoporum platycarpum with areas of Eucalyptus socialis over an understorey of Atriplex sp., Kochia sedifolia and Enchylaena tomentosa” and as having a “disturbed natural condition” due to "a long history of grazing".

In 2004, it was reported as having “good examples of the flora of the area dominated by the black oak (Casuarina pauper) and bluebush (Maireana sedifolia)” and “several creek beds with steep banks suitable for red-backed kingfishers and rainbow bee-eaters to nest”.

The conservation park is classified as an IUCN Category III protected area. It was listed on the now-defunct Register of the National Estate.

== See also ==
- Protected areas of South Australia
