= Albert Macdonald =

Albert Macdonald may refer to:

- Ab Macdonald, South Australian horse trainer
- Albert Frederick Macdonald, Canadian politician
- Albert MacDonald (cyclist), Australian cyclist

== See also ==
- Albert McDonald, American politician
