= Hundred of Oladdie =

Hundred in the County of Dalhousie, South Australia

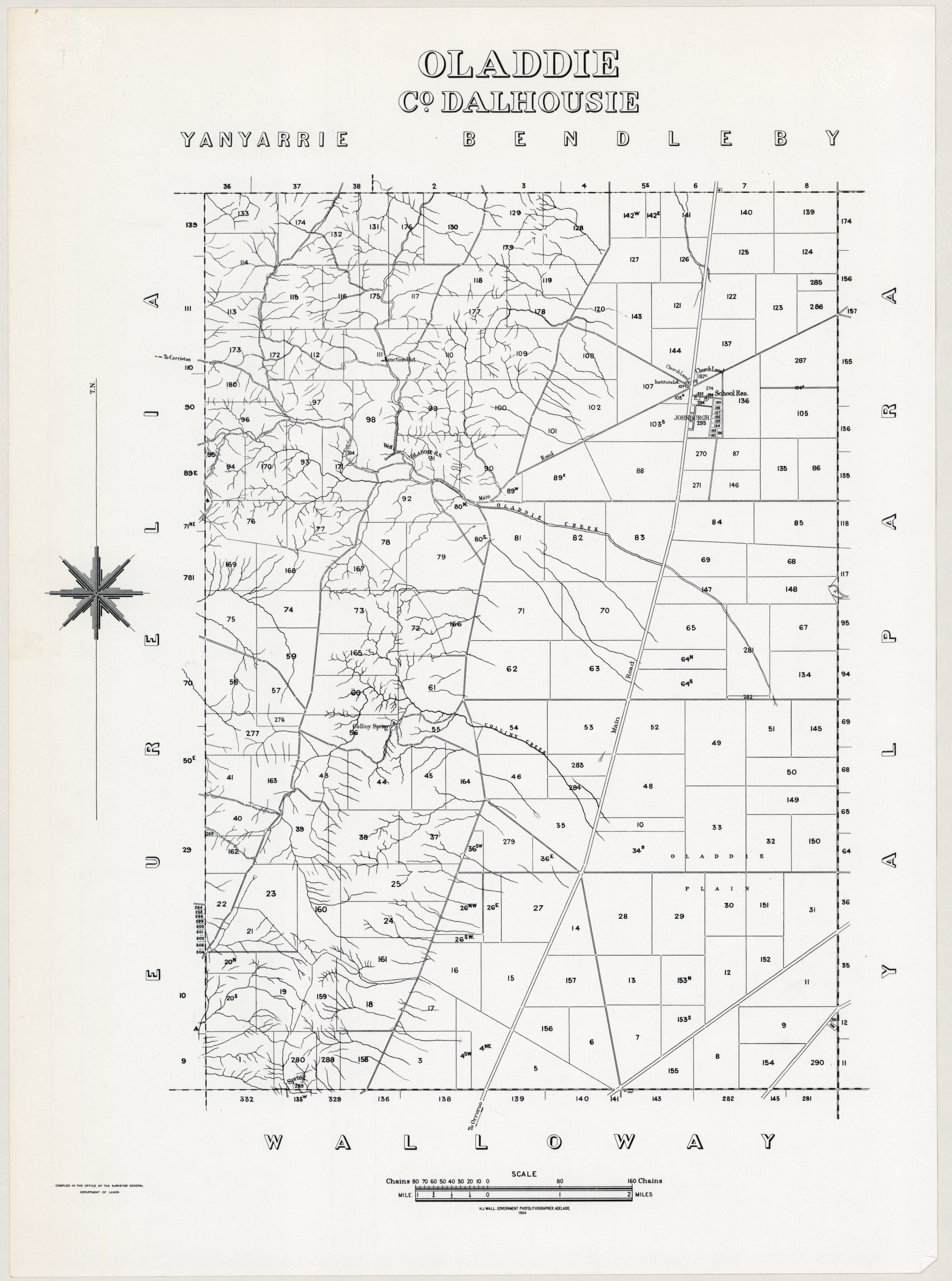
Hundred of Oladdie, 1964

The Hundred of Oladdie is a hundred in the County of Dalhousie, South Australia. The hundred was established 1876 but has no townships. A settlement at Oladdie was abandoned.

Oladdie is south of Johnburgh , east of Eurelia and southeast of Ivy Glen homestead. Oladdie has an elevation of 377 metres (1,237 ft) above sea level.
