= Morchard, South Australia =

Morchard South Australia
- Coordinates: 32°43′18″S 138°29′34″E
- Population: 19 (SAL 2021)
- Established: 9 August 1877 (town); 13 March 1997 (locality)
- Postcode(s): 5431
- Location: 13 km (8 mi) west of Orroroo
- LGA(s): Orroroo Carrieton; Mount Remarkable
- Region: Yorke and Mid North
- County: Dalhousie; Frome
- State electorate(s): Stuart
- Federal division(s): Grey
Localities around Morchard:
Amyton	Coomooroo	Coomooroo
Willowie	Morchard	Coomooroo
Willowie; Pekina	Pekina	Coomooroo; Pekina
- Footnotes: Adjoining localities

Morchard is a town and locality in the Australian state of South Australia located on the Wilmington-Ucolta Road in the state's Mid North region.

The Morchard Hotel, which is still standing today, was opened in 1878. The licensee was George Dowdy.
