= Wheatbelt =

Wheatbelt or wheat belt may refer to:

- Wheatbelt (Australia), areas of Australia where wheat has been produced
  - Wheatbelt (Western Australia), one of the nine regions of Western Australia
- Wheat belt (North America), the part of North America where wheat is the primary crop

== See also ==
- Avon Wheatbelt, an Australian bioregion in Western Australia
- Breadbasket, any region that produces a lot of wheat or other grain, including a list of regions worldwide
