= Coomooroo, South Australia =

Coomooroo
- Town
- Coordinates: 32.62°S 138.46°E
- Country: Australia
- State: South Australia
- LGAs: Orroroo Carrieton; Mount Remarkable

Government
  - State electorate: Stuart
  - Federal division: Grey

Population
  - Total: 13 (SAL 2021)
- Postcode: 5431
Localities around Coomooroo
Hammond	Hammond; Eurelia	Eurelia
Amyton; Morchard	Coomooroo	Walloway; Orroroo
Morchard	Morchard; Pekina	Orroroo

Coomooroo is a rural locality in the Mid North region of South Australia, approximately 3 hours' drive north of Adelaide. With a population of 13 as of 2021, Coomooroo is now considered a ghost town.

Most of Coomooroo lies within the District Council of Orroroo Carrieton. However, a small section on its western end lies within the District Council of Mount Remarkable. The Orroroo Carrieton section consists of a diagonal rural strip of the cadastral Hundred of Coomooroo separating the towns of Morchard and Walloway, with narrow strips of the Hundreds of Eurelia and Pinda at its north-western end.

== History ==
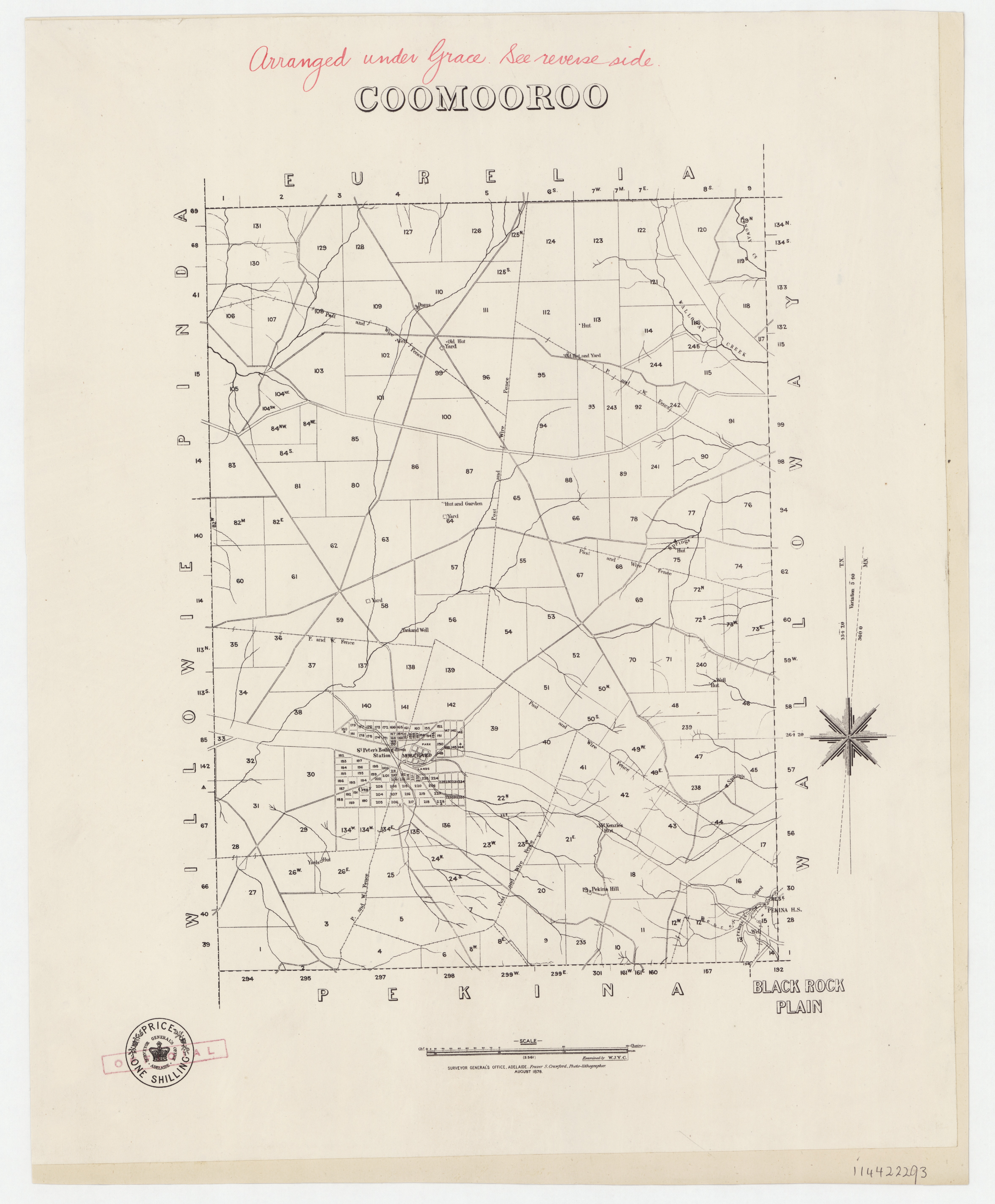

Coomooroo is situated on the traditional lands of the Ngadjuri people. The Ngadjuri have been largely overlooked in the histories of colonization and the subsequent dispossession from their traditional lands.

The locality derives its name from the Hundred of Coomooroo, which Governor Anthony Musgrave named in 1875 after a word meaning "small food seeds" in an unknown Aboriginal language. While the area was informally known as Poverty Corner, it was formally named Coomooroo at the request of the District Council of Mount Remarkable. In 1882, newly-opened Hundreds, including portions of the Hundred of Coomooroo, were put up for sale.

The settlement process in the Upper North of South Australia is an intriguing case study of the economic and social changes brought about by land reform legislation in the 1860s. Within a decade, an extensive area of pastoral land was transformed into agricultural use, making it one of the most remarkable instances of its kind in Australia.

Coomooroo lies just north of Goyder's Line, which marks the boundary of land suitable for cropping due to rainfall levels. North of Goyder's Line, the annual rainfall is generally insufficient to support crops, limiting the land to grazing purposes. Despite some development efforts in the region, adverse conditions repeatedly hindered progress. As early as 1876, the South Australian Register reported on the challenges faced by settlers in Coomooroo due to unfavorable weather conditions.

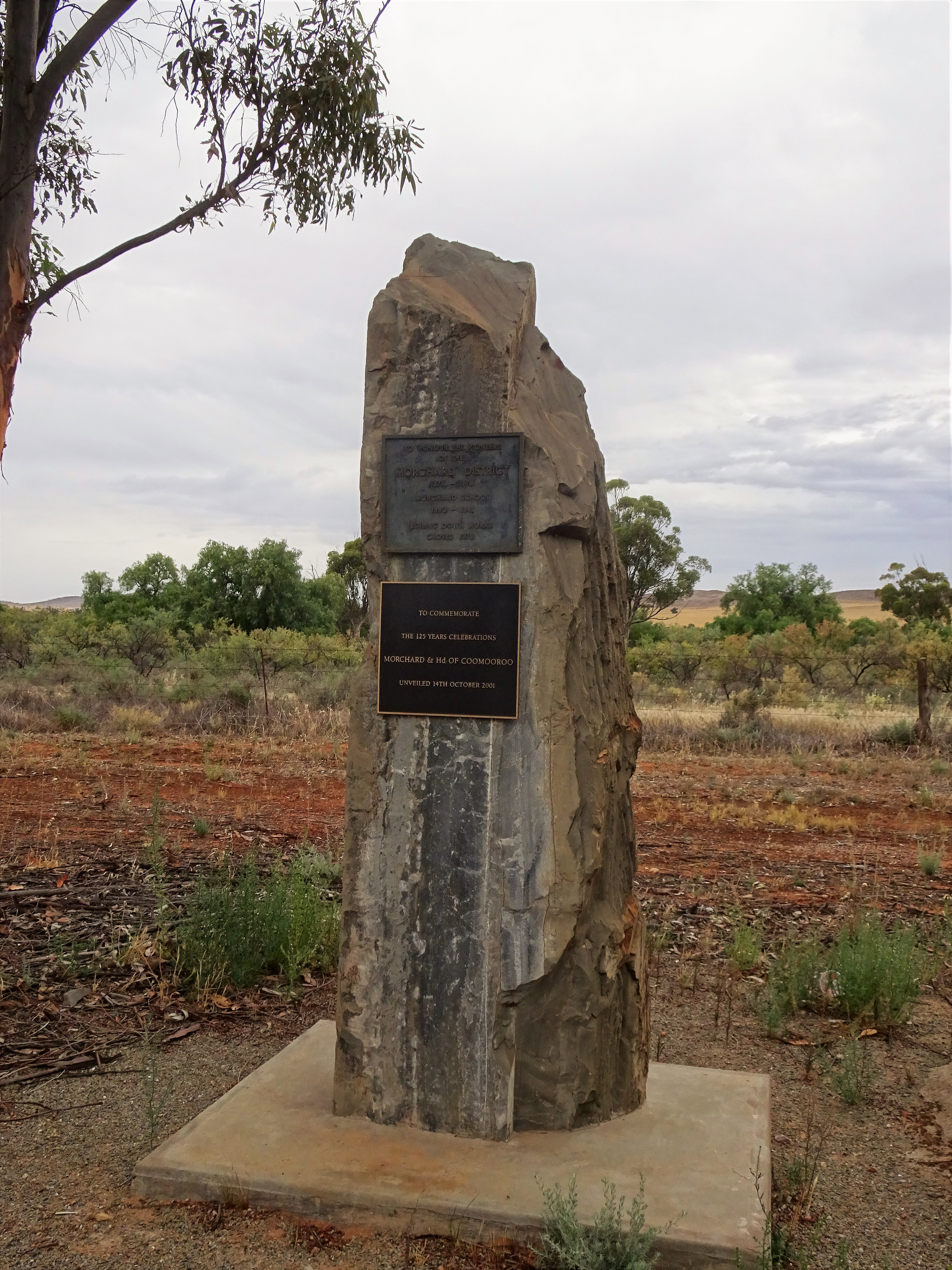
Morchard and Coomooroo 125 Year Commemoration Plaque

The Coomooroo School opened its doors in 1881 and remained in operation until its closure in 1917. The residents petitioned for a post office, but ultimately one was established in nearby Morchard instead. At different points in the town history, Coomoroo had community organisations such as an Agricultural Board, a dog coursing club, cricket club, and tennis club. Notably, one Coomooroo resident, Robert Wilfred Robertson, was killed in action in World War 1 and is commemorated at the Australian War Memorial.

In 1976, a book titled "Reflections: The story of the Morchard District and the Hundred of Coomooroo" was compiled in conjunction with the centenary celebrations of Morchard and Coomooroo. Additionally, in 2001, a plaque commemorating 125 years of European settlement in Morchard and Coomooroo was erected in nearby Morchard.

== Landmarks ==
The historic Pekina Run Ruins, located at the south-eastern tip of Coomooroo, are listed on the South Australian Heritage Register. The Pekina Run ruins are significant as the relatively well-preserved remains of an early and large homestead complex of the 1840s, completely abandoned and allowed to fall into ruin after the Strangways land resumptions of the 1870s.
