= County of Dalhousie (South Australia) =

Dalhousie
- Cadastral division
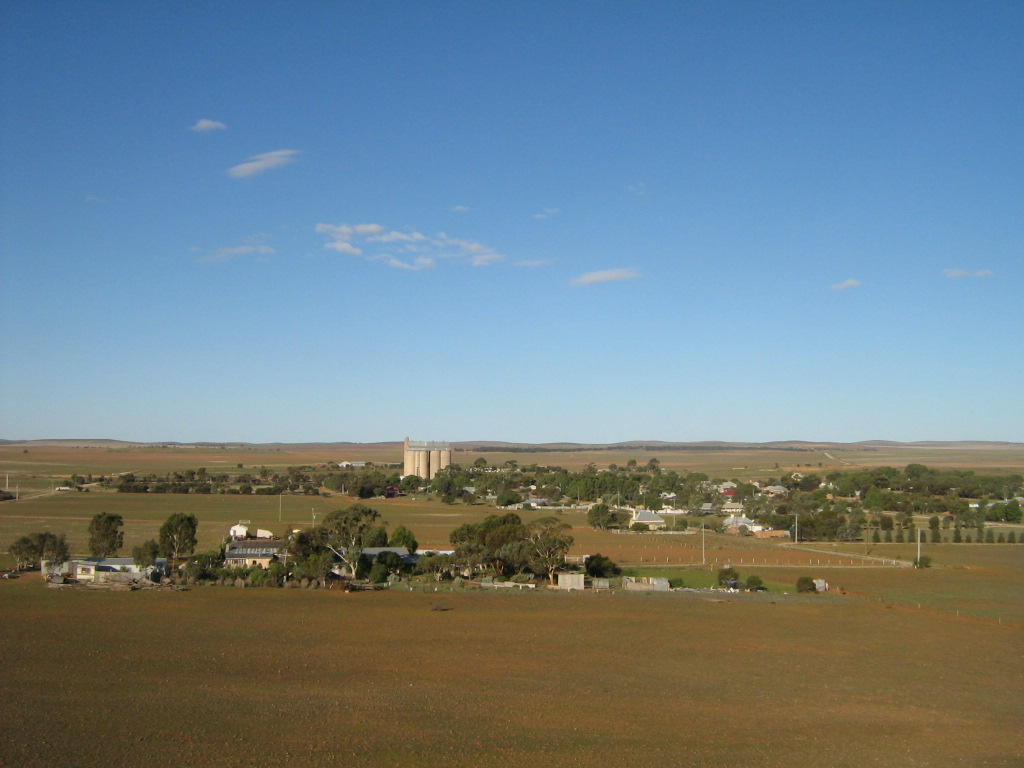
- Landscape near Yongala in the south of the county

- Coordinates: 32.738°S 138.673°E
- Country: Australia
- State: South Australia
- LGA: District Council of Orroroo Carrieton District Council of Peterborough Northern Areas Council
- Established: 1871

Area
  - Total: 3,200 km^{2} (1,230 sq mi)
Lands administrative divisions around Dalhousie
Newcastle	Granville	Granville
Frome	Dalhousie	Herbert
Victoria	Victoria	Kimberley

The County of Dalhousie is one of the 49 cadastral counties of South Australia in straddling the Mid North and Flinders Ranges regions. It was proclaimed in 1871 by Governor James Fergusson and was named for Fergusson's father-in-law James Broun-Ramsay, 1st Marquess of Dalhousie.

== Local government ==
The first local government in the county was the District Council of Yongala, established 1883, covering the Hundred of Yongala in the county's south east corner. The Corporate Town of Peterborough was established by separation from Yongala in 1886. Local government in the rest of the county was established in 1888 by the creation of the District Council of Orroroo at Orroroo and the District Council of Carrieton at Carrieton. They were created by the passage of the District Councils Act 1887 on 5 January 1888. As part of the same legislation in action, the District Council of Caltowie gained the Hundred of Tarcowie in the south west corner of the county.

In 1935 when Yongala council amalgamated with the adjacent District Council of Coglin to create the District Council of Peterborough and in 1997 the enclave corporate town was also amalgamated.

The Orroroo and Carrieton councils also amalgamated in 1997 to form the District Council of Orroroo Carrieton, which is currently the main local government body in the county.

== Hundreds ==
The county is divided into the following hundreds:

- Hundred of Black Rock Plain, established 1871 (Black Rock)
- Hundred of Coomooroo, established 1875 (Coomooroo, Morchard, Walloway)
- Hundred of Erskine, established 1876 (Erskine)
- Hundred of Eurelia, established 1876 (Carrieton, Eurelia)
- Hundred of Mannanarie, established 1871 (Mannanarie)
- Hundred of Morgan, established 1876 (Minvalara)
- Hundred of Oladdie, established 1876 (Johnburgh)
- Hundred of Pekina, established 1871 (Pekina)
- Hundred of Tarcowie, established 1871 (Tarcowie)
- Hundred of Walloway, established 1875 (Orroroo)
- Hundred of Yalpara, established 1876 (Yalpara)
- Hundred of Yongala, established 1871 (Peterborough, Yongala)
