= Pekina =

Pekina South Australia
- Coordinates: 32°50′19″S 138°33′07″E
- Population: 70 (2021 census)
- Established: 20 May 1875 (town); 16 December 1999 (locality)
- Postcode(s): 5431
- Time zone: ACST (UTC+9:30)
  - Summer (DST): ACST (UTC+10:30)
- Location: 270 km (168 mi) N of Adelaide; 14 km (9 mi) S of Orroroo
- LGA(s): District Council of Orroroo Carrieton
- County: Dalhousie
- Parish: Yorke and Mid North
- State electorate(s): Stuart
- Federal division(s): Grey
Mean max temp	Mean min temp	Annual rainfall
21.9 °C; 71 °F	7.4 °C; 45 °F	364.8 mm 14.4 in
Localities around Pekina:
Willowie	Willowie; Morchard; Coomooroo	Orroroo
Willowie; Booleroo Centre	Pekina	Orroroo; Black Rock; Tarcowie
Booleroo Centre	Tarcowie	Tarcowie
- Footnotes: Adjoining localities

Pekina is a town and locality in the Mid North region of South Australia. The town is located in the District Council of Orroroo Carrieton local government area, 270 kilometres (170 mi) north of the state capital, Adelaide.

The name of the town is thought to derive from the Aboriginal (Note: Adnyamathanha was the local language.) word for "creek water", from which Pekina Station derived its name.

European settlement in the Pekina district began in earnest in 1846 when Price Maurice brought 3000 sheep to the district. Pekina Station, a sheep station, "one of the most profitable sheep runs" in South Australia, became a stopping-point for coaches on the run between Blinman and Burra.

In 1871, Pekina Station was resumed and broken up for closer settlement. The region was settled by German and especially Irish migrant farmers. Problems with drought, rust and locusts in the 1880s meant the town grew slowly with only around 75 residents at the beginning of the 20th century. Pekina's Irish Catholic heritage has seen the district nicknamed "Vatican Valley".

At the 2006 census, Pekina and the surrounding area had a population of 172; in 2021, it was down to 70.

The historic former Pekina Animal Pound is listed on the South Australian Heritage Register.
