= Minburra =

- Suburb
- Coordinates: 32°32′54″S 138°49′49″E
- Country: Australia
- State: South Australia
- Region: Yorke and Mid North
- LGA: District Council of Orroroo Carrieton
- Location: 265 km (165 mi) N of Adelaide; 28 km (17 mi) NE of Orroroo
- Established: 16 December 1999

Government
  - State electorate: Stuart
  - Federal division: Grey

Population
  - Total: 0 (2016 census)
- Time zone: UTC+9:30 (ACST)
  - Summer (DST): UTC+10:30 (ACST)
- Postcode: 5431
- County: Dalhousie
- Mean max temp: 21.9 °C (71.4 °F)
- Mean min temp: 7.3 °C (45.1 °F)
- Annual rainfall: 365.7 mm (14.40 in)
Suburbs around Minburra
Johnburgh	Yalpara	Yalpara
Johnburgh	Minburra	Yalpara
Orroroo	Orroroo	Orroroo

Minburra is a locality in the Australian state of South Australia located about 265 kilometres (165 mi) north of the state capital of Adelaide and about 29 kilometres (18 mi) north-east of the municipal seat in Orroroo.

The locality 's boundaries were created on 16 December 1999 and includes the site of the now-ceased government town of Gallwey. Gallwey was proclaimed on 2 December 1880 and was declared "ceased to exist" on 24 September 1944.

Land use within the locality is ’primary production’ and is concerned with “agricultural production and the grazing of stock on relatively large holdings.

The 2016 Australian census which was conducted in August 2016 reports that no people were living in Minburra.

It is located within the federal division of Grey, the state electoral district of Stuart and the local government area of the District Council of Orroroo Carrieton.
