= Ab Macdonald =

Albert "Ab" Macdonald (1896 – after 1967), often McDonald, was a South Australian horse trainer. Among the horses he trained were winners of the Adelaide Cup, VRC Oaks, AJC Oaks and SA Derby.

== History ==
Macdonald was born in Orroroo, South Australia, one of six sons of George Alexander Macdonald (1862 – 26 July 1915) and Annie Macdonald, née McMahon (c. 1866 – 6 November 1955), who married in 1884.

G. A. Macdonald's brother, telegraphist and inventor Albert MacDonald, in 1898 rode a "Swift" bicycle from Adelaide to Darwin in 28 days, 15 hours, 30 mins.
The first and only previous cyclist to perform this feat was Jerome J. Murit, in 72 days. Ten years later, Dutton and Aunger were the first to make the trip in a motor car, a 25HP Talbot, in 53 days.

At age 14 Macdonald left for Queensland, droving cattle between there and the Northern Territory. His father was a noted jockey and trainer in a district known for its contribution to thoroughbred racing, and when he died the son returned to take over his stables. He first came to public attention at the Orroroo races of February 1922, when he trained and rode three winning horses, one being over hurdles. He had successes in country meetings with Mambray Lord, who also took third place in the 1923 Adelaide Cup.

In 1927, after some success with Ailerue, a sprinter who won eight races in a year, he set up as a public trainer with stables at Moore Street, Somerton, and cemented his reputation with Silent March, who, ridden by Harry Walsh, won the 1940 SAJC St Leger and the Birthday Cup. He had successes with Mollymawk, My Saint, Terebooka, Wynall Twain, Irrappatana, Unification, Present, Miss Rosa, Dell Fire, Cesariona, Alwyne King, Rose Glen, Lord Traquair, Molly Pistol, King Frederick, Explore, Sieraetus, Hieration, Boonah Boy, Whyalpa, Indian Seal, Baryta (dam of Wynall, Hilarity and Alkali), Gay Boy, Wongyarra, and a great number of others. Later successes were Aldershot (1952 Adelaide Cup), Farmer's Daughter (1966 VRC Oaks), (1967 AJC Oaks), Tasman Pride, Shako, Balloch Gold and Axinite.

In 1938 on the second day of the Port Augusta carnival, three of his horses, Royal Pilgrim, Mooloogan, and Malolo took the first three races.

In the 1950 Clarendon Handicap, the Macdonald brothers took first and second places with Peter Pim and Dark Banner, also siblings, having been sired by Powerscourt.

== Recognition ==
Macdonald was in 2015 inducted into the Thoroughbred Racing SA Hall of Fame.

== Personal ==
Records of a marriage or children have not been found. His home address in 1962 was 13 Moore Street, Somerton Park (Parry Street corner). Brothers George (George Alexander Macdonald, 1902–1986), Frank (George Frank Macdonald, 1889–1967) and Dave (David George Macdonald, 1913–1987) were also trainers. as was nephew Leon Macdonald, (born 1942) who in 1977 took over his uncle George Macdonald's stables in Morphettville.
