= Wheatbelt (Australia) =

Agricultural regions

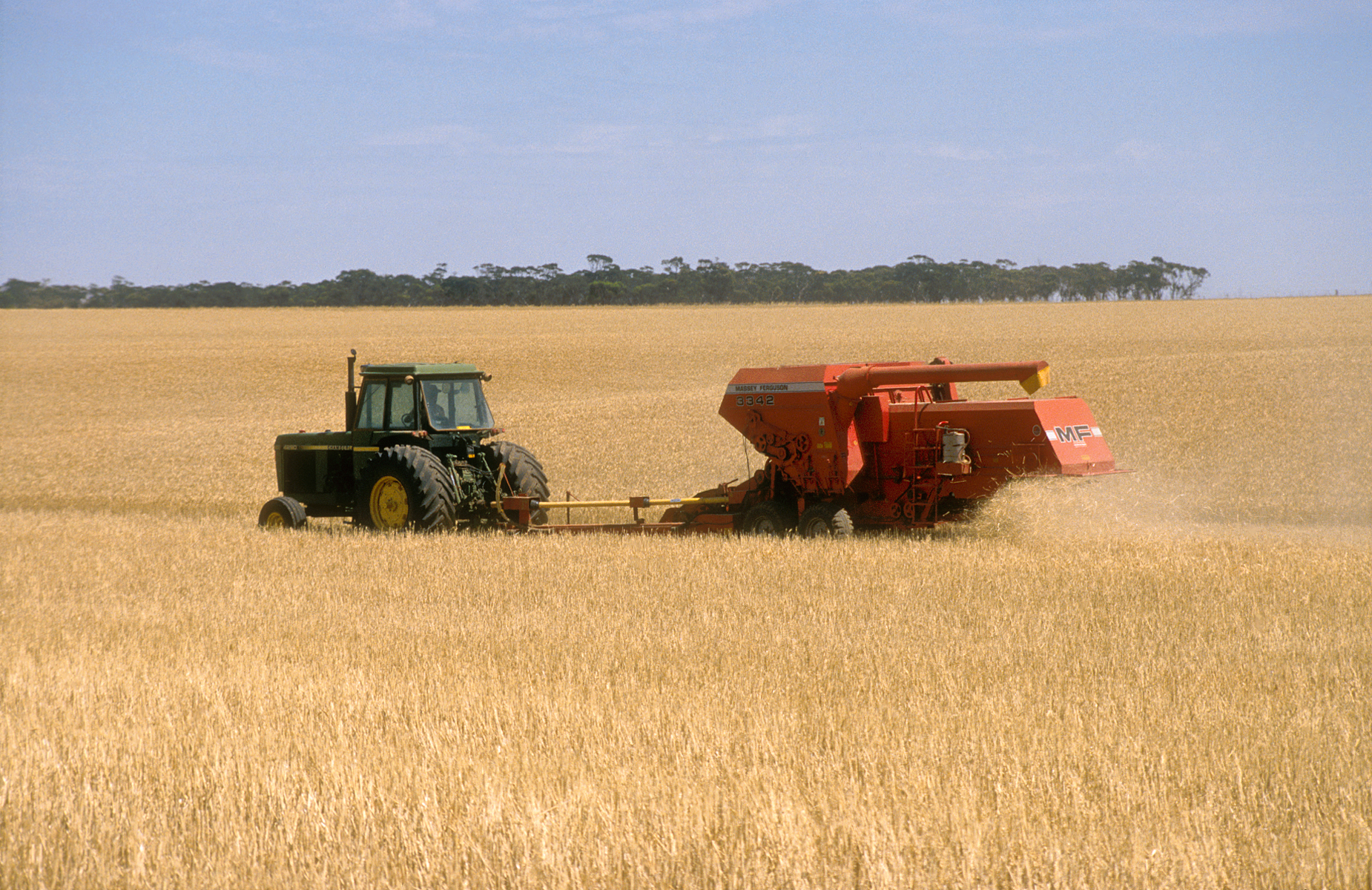
Wheat harvest in Blyth

Australian wheatbelts comprise inland agricultural regions across southern and eastern Australia. The regions are named for wheat, which was the main agricultural product in the early history of Australia's development; today, many other crops are also produced.

== Climate ==
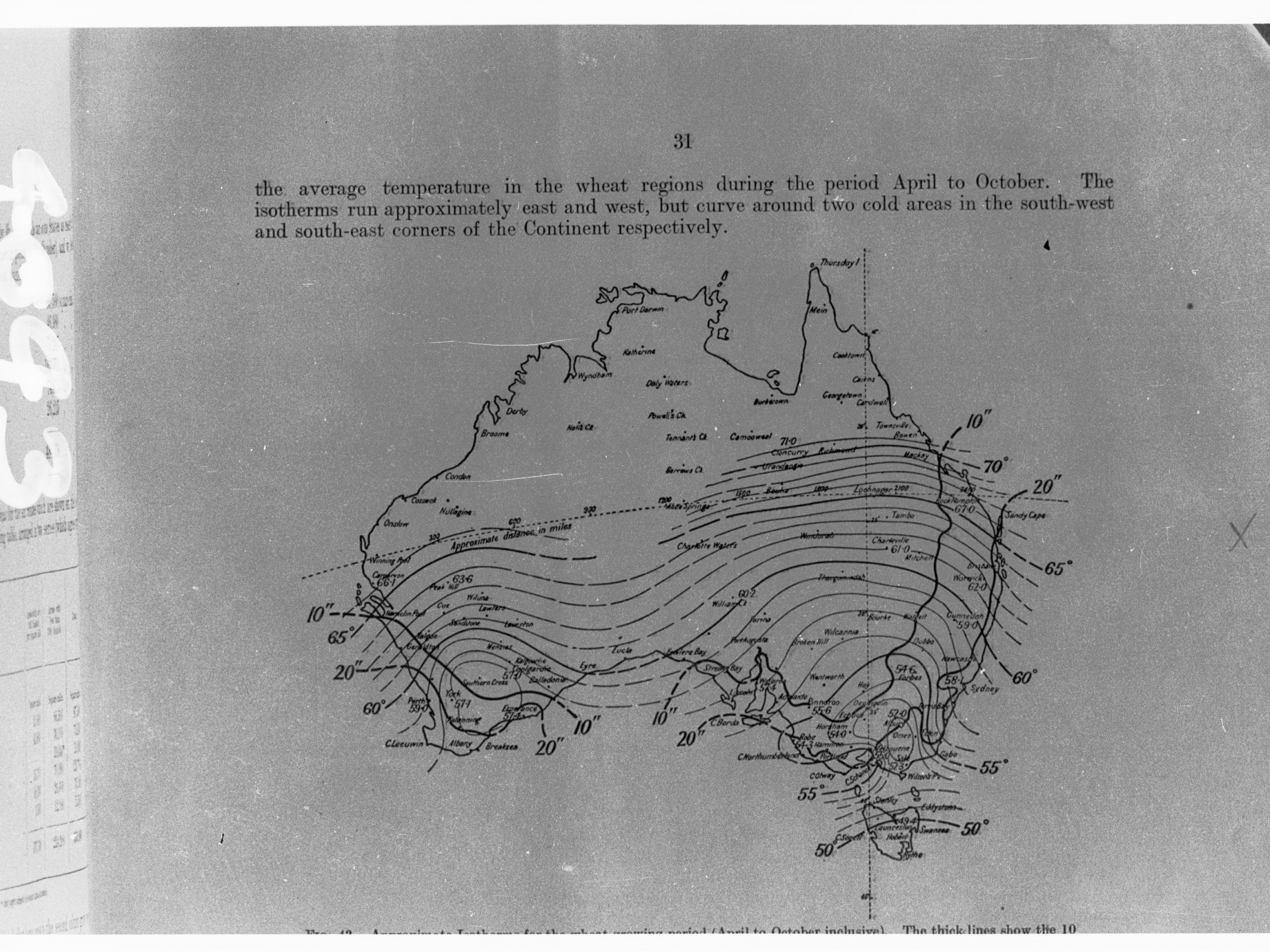
1905 map of wheat regions

The wheatbelt is relatively dry with low levels of underground water, making agriculture largely reliant on the rainfall. Rainfall varies from the coastal regions, which have more dependable rain to the drier and more volatile inland regions. In the wheatbelt, both land productivity and prices tend to be determined by the level of rainfall.

=== Regions ===
Wheat-growing regions in Australia are situated within the temperate zones of the country such as areas that receive more than 300 mm (11.8 inches) of rainfall annually. The isopleth of the wheatbelt corresponds to the Goyder's line in South Australia, with Orroroo and Minnipa being on the boundary. In Western Australia, Southern Cross lies on the bounds, with other areas on the boundary being Mildura in Victoria, Cobar or Walgett to Deniliquin in New South Wales, and St George in Queensland.

== Production ==
In addition to wheat, the wheatbelt produces coarse grains (including barley, oats, sorghum, and maize), oilseeds (including rapeseed, sunflower, soybean, safflower and linseed) and legumes (including lupins, peanuts, and various peas, beans and lentils).

== See also ==
- Agriculture in Australia
- Climate of Australia
- Geography of Australia
