= Nellie Flynn =

Australian Aboriginal leader (1881–1982)

- Flynn holding a snake, undated.
- Born: 4 August 1881; Powell Creek Telegraph Station, Northern Territory, Australia
- Died: 31 December 1982 (aged 101)
- Spouse: Tom Flynn (m. 1909)
- Children: 10

Frances Taylor, on left, with her mother Nellie Flynn during the 1961 NT News "Walkabout".

Nellie 'Shotgun' Flynn (4 August 1881 – 31 December 1982) was an Aboriginal Australian who was a matriarch of her family and a community leader.

== Life in the Northern Territory ==
Flynn was born in 1881 at Powell Creek Telegraph Station, just south of Elliott, and was the daughter of Maggie and Lindsay Crawford; her mother was an Aboriginal woman and her father was Māori. Flynn never knew her mother as she died when she was a small child. Relatives where unable to care for Flynn and she began working as a housemaid as a young girl and, eventually, walked to Pine Creek (a distance of almost 600 km) and began working at the Pine Creek Hotel. Flynn only worked there for a short time as she "could not stand the drunks" and was a teetotaller herself. However, it was there that she met her future husband Tom Flynn who was employed on the North Australia Railway at Rum Jungle.

Flynn was only about 145cms tall and Tom was described as an "Irish giant" at 189cms tall.

Flynn's grandson John Scrutton said of the pair that: "[t]he two of them just clicked and the rest is history," and that "[t]hey just adored each other".

They married in October 1909, when a Catholic priest passed through. The ring used was made from gold that Tom found when digging the railway. Their marriage was one of the last interracial marriages in the Northern Territory for some time due to restrictions brought in with the Northern Territory Aboriginals Act 1910.

The couple relocated to Rum Jungle together, where they lived in a railway cottage until Tom built them a home at Rum Jungle Creek. It was an old railway shed that he and his horses pushed up a hill. The couple had 10 children together. Flynn was remembered by many of the locals for walking from her home in Rum Jungle to Batchelor each week for supplies and often carrying large amounts of supplies with her.

During World War II, Flynn and her husband were told to evacuate, but chose to remain at their home. They and their daughters Bessie and Josie were the only civilians to remain in the area. Flynn said that they were well looked after during this period and that the closest they came to seeing anything of the bombing was when the petrol dump at Batchelor was destroyed and the impact threw Tom against the kitchen stove. She also remembered the Army sergeant who told them to never look at the night sky as their faces would reflect the moonlight, and the Japanese would spot them and machine-gun them.

Flynn was given the name 'Shotgun Nellie' from her skill with a rifle. She was fiercely protective of her family and home and often protected them with this gun. In one incident, a passing swagman "started to get a bit cheeky" with Flynn and her daughter, and she wielded the shotgun at him to get him off the property. She made national news in 1969 for wielding her 59-year-old shotgun at a group of boys who had burned down the footbridge at her home.

In 1961, at the age of 80 and in a sparkly gold ankle-length dress, she famously walked 25 km for the NT News Walkabout, a fundraiser organised by Jim Bowditch Despite trailing behind others she vowed: "I'll knock 'em off... I'll leave em dead by the roadside". After completing the walk, as the last over the line, she was rewarded with afternoon tea at Government House.

After the death of her husband, who had become blind many years before, Flynn moved to Darwin and was living in Rapid Creek when Cyclone Tracy hit. After the disaster, Flynn refused to evacuate and hid for three days under some scraps of canvas in her roofless home; she feared that she would never survive the flight south.

In 1981, she received a 100th birthday telegram from Queen Elizabeth II, then-Prime Minister Malcolm Fraser, and many others from around Australia.

Nellie died in 1982 at 101 years old. She was believed to have been the oldest Territorian who had ever lived at that time. It is said that:

She is typical of the Territory's pioneering spirit, the battles who fought tremendous odds to wring a living from an uncompromising and unyielding outback

— Terry Dahlenburg, NT News, 1 August 1981

== Legacy ==
Flynn's grandson, John Scrutton, published a storytelling artwork called ‘The Real Map of Batchelor According to Me’ which contains stories about Flynn woven alongside his own memories of life in Batchelor.

== Resources ==
There is a collection of biographical clippings of Flynn available at the National Library of Australia.
