= Powell Creek Telegraph Station =

Station in the Northern Territory, Australia

- Location within Northern Territory
- Location: Northern Territory, Pamayu
- Coordinates: 18°05′00″S 133°40′00″E

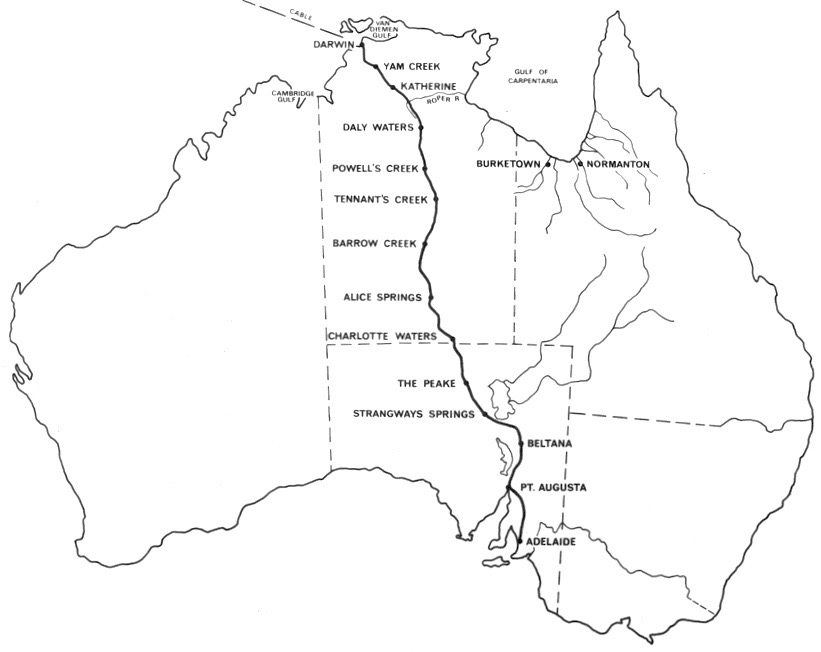
Map of Australia's Overland Telegraph Line, c. 1940

Telegraph Station at Powell Creek, 1931

Powell Creek Telegraph Station was a repeater station for the Australian Overland Telegraph Line and it sat between the Tennant Creek Telegraph Station and the Daly Waters Telegraph Station. It was one of the more important telegraph stations along the line as inland weather conditions were so favourable that not all stations where required to support the line.

The telegraph station takes it name from the nearby Powell Creek which was named by John McDouall Stuart on 19 June 1861 after JW Powell.

It is located 60 km south of Elliott and 200 km from Tennant Creek. It listed on the Northern Territory Heritage Register and was previously listed on the Register of National Estate.

The area where it is located is now known as Pamayu (pronounced "Bama-yu") which is the Djingili name for this place.

== History ==
The Powell Creek Telegraph Station was originally a temporary timber office and quarters that were constructed in 1872 and it was not officially opened until 1 January 1874 when these were replaced with a substantial stone building with a galvanised iron roof.

During the 1880s that station was staffed by the Station Master, an assistant operator and five linesmen and labourer's. During this time it also became a stop in point for many travelers, explorers and drovers; especially as the pastoral industry in the region grew. In 1881 Nellie Flynn was born there, her father was Lindsey Crawford, was a linesman working there.

In 1889 a police station was established at Powell Creek in an attempt to address the theft of livestock on the overland routes to Queensland and, at some time later, an Aboriginal ration depot was opened there.

One telegraph operators there, from 1895 - 1898, was Albert MacDonald who, after the completion of his work there, rode his bicycle from Darwin to Melbourne; he left Darwin on 22 August 1898 and arrived in Adelaide on 18 September 1898 having covered 3000 km in 28 days. He then arrived in Melbourne 6 days after that. Another staff member, Alfred Pybus, died and was buried there on 10 April 1900.

The Telegraph Station ceased operation in the 1930s was abandoned in 1955.

It is now a tourist attraction which is open to visitors.
