= Yalpara, South Australia =

Yalpara South Australia
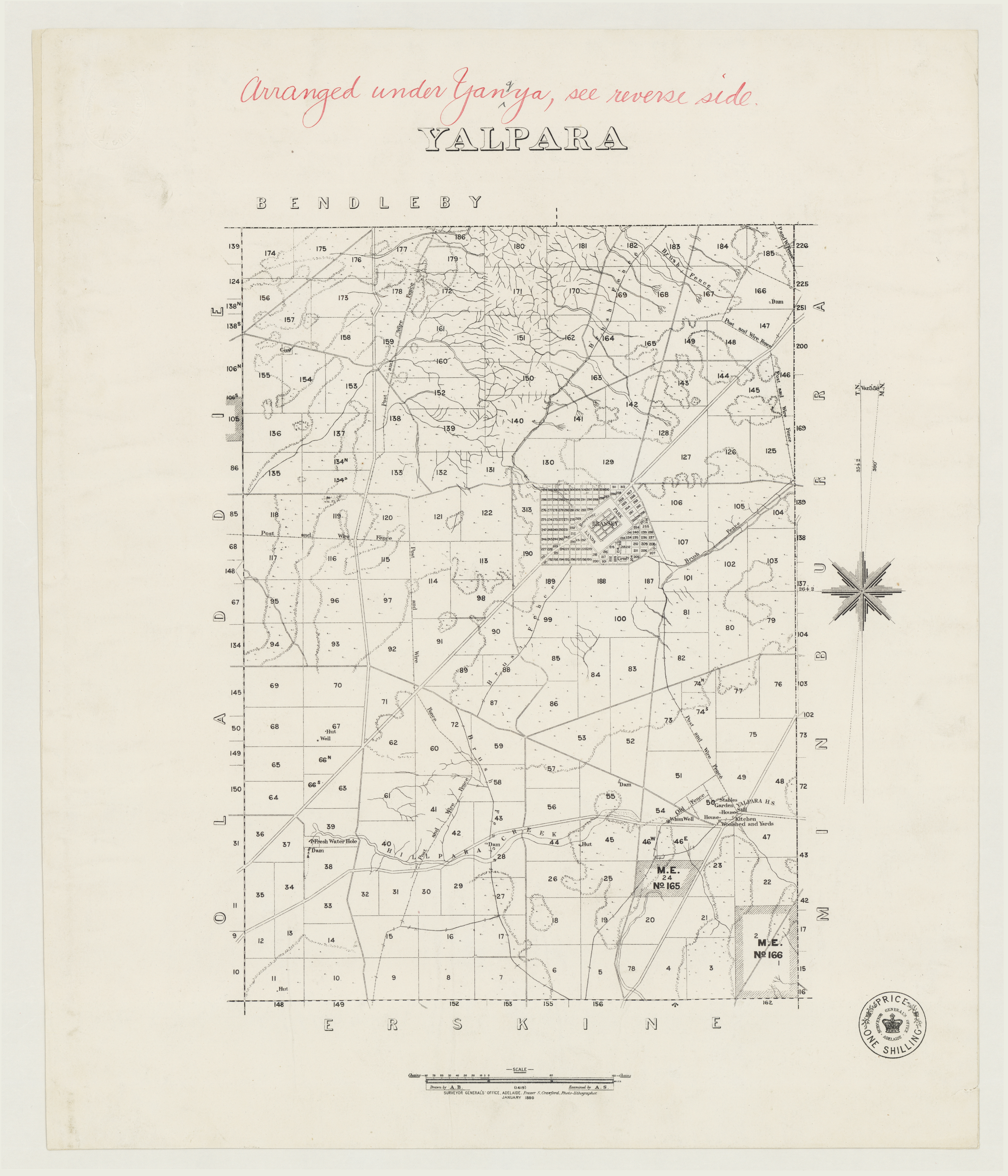
- The Hundred of Yalpara, circa 1880, which shows the extent of the now-ceased government town of Brassey.

- Coordinates: 32°32′54″S 138°49′49″E
- Population: 6 (SAL 2021)
- Established: 16 December 1999
- Postcode(s): 5431
- Elevation: 297 m (974 ft)
- Time zone: ACST (UTC+9:30)
  - Summer (DST): ACST (UTC+10:30)
- Location: 265 km (165 mi) N of Adelaide; 28 km (17 mi) NE of Orroroo
- LGA(s): District Council of Orroroo Carrieton
- Region: Yorke and Mid North
- County: Dalhousie
- State electorate(s): Stuart
- Federal division(s): Grey
Mean max temp	Mean min temp	Annual rainfall
21.9 °C; 71 °F	7.3 °C; 45 °F	366.2 mm 14.4 in
Suburbs around Yalpara:
Belton	Belton; North Hills; Minburra Station	Minburra Station
Johnburgh; Minburra	Yalpara	Minburra Plain
Orroroo	Orroroo; Erskine	Cavanagh

Yalpara is a locality in the Australian state of South Australia located about 265 kilometres (165 mi) north of the state capital of Adelaide and about 29 kilometres (18 mi) north-east of the municipal seat in Orroroo.

== Geography ==
The boundaries of Yalpara were created on 16 December 1999 for the "long established name". This name is based on the Hundred of Yalpara, a cadastral division which has similar boundaries to the locality. The locality includes the site of the now-ceased Government Town of Brassey which was surveyed in June 1879 and "declared ceased to exist" on 24 February 1927.

== Origin of the name ==
The origin of the name Brassey is not known, Geoffrey Manning, the South Australian historian, suggests that "it was the name of an associate of Governor Jervois, the most likely candidate being Thomas Brassey (1805-1870), a railway contractor and an associate of Robert Stephenson." The Hundred of Yalpara, which also contains a portion of the locality of Minburra was named after an unknown Aboriginal word.

The Yalpara Post Office, opened in December 1880 and closed on 30 April 1917, similarly Yalpara School opened in 1883 and closed in 1903.

Yalpara Station experienced flooding in December 1933.

Land use within the locality is "primary production" and is concerned with "agricultural production and the grazing of stock on relatively large holdings." Some land in its south has been gazetted as a protected area known as the Yalpara Conservation Park.

Yalpara is located within the federal division of Grey, the state electoral district of Stuart and the local government area of the District Council of Orroroo Carrieton.
