= Johnburgh, South Australia =

Johnburgh South Australia
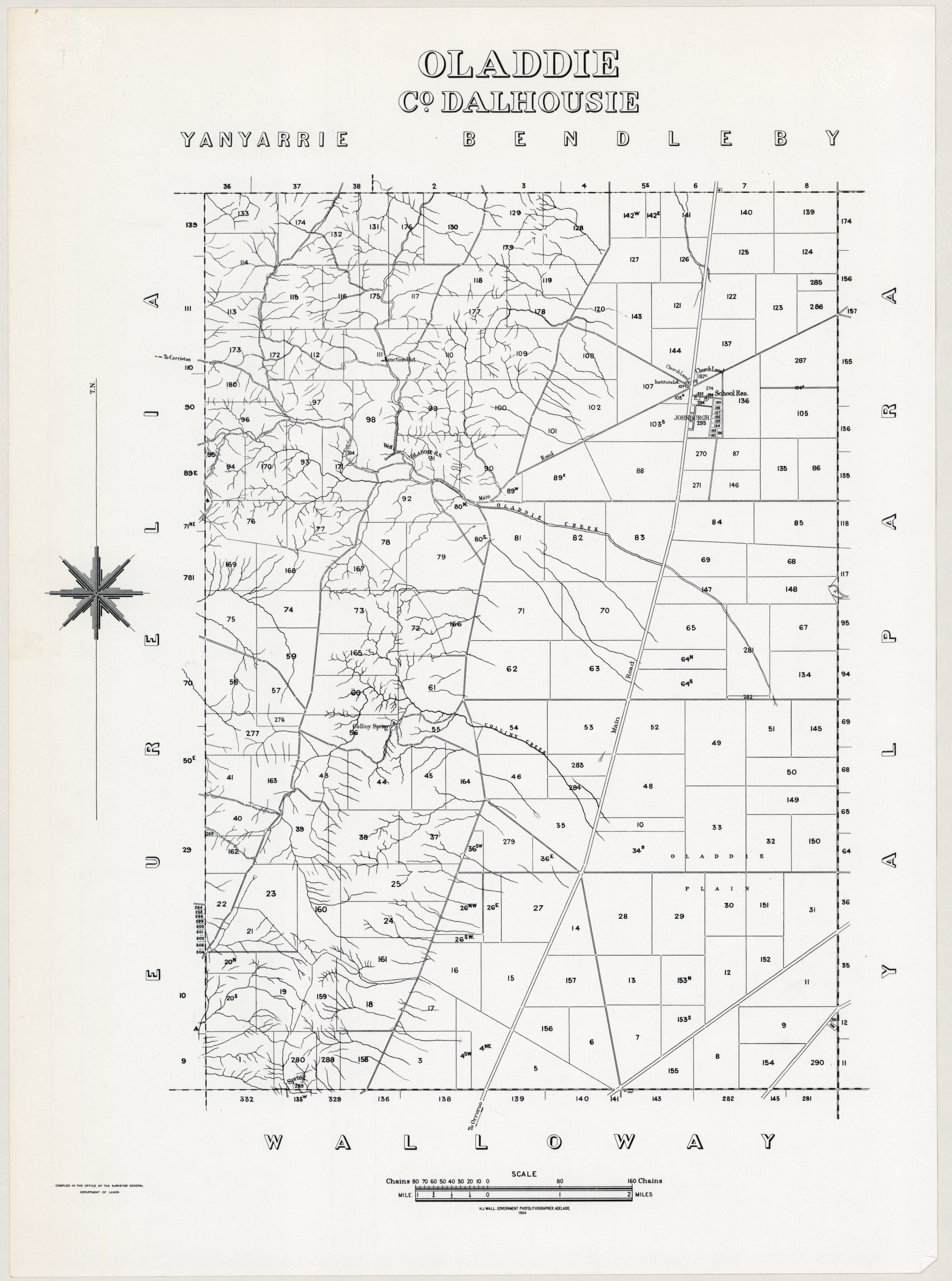
- Hundred of Oladdie, circa 1964, which shows the extent of the government town of Johnburgh in the top right hand corner

- Coordinates: 32°27′41″S 138°42′15″E
- Population: 10 (SAL 2021)
- Established: 10 July 1879 (town); 16 December 1999 (locality)
- Postcode(s): 5431
- Time zone: ACST (UTC+9:30)
  - Summer (DST): ACST (UTC+10:30)
- Location: 275 km (171 mi) N of Adelaide; 32 km (20 mi) NE of Orroroo
- LGA(s): District Council of Orroroo Carrieton
- Region: Yorke and Mid North
- County: Dalhousie
- State electorate(s): Stuart
- Federal division(s): Grey
| Mean max temp | Mean min temp | Annual rainfall |
| 21.9 °C; 71 °F | 7.3 °C; 45 °F | 366.2 mm 14.4 in |
Suburbs around Johnburgh:
| Yanyarrie; Carrieton | Belton | Belton |
| Carrieton; Eurelia | Johnburgh | Yalpara; Minburra |
| Walloway | Walloway; Orroroo; Minburra; Walloway | Minburra |
- Footnotes: Location; Adjoining localities

Johnburgh is a former town and a locality in the Australian state of South Australia located on the eastern side of the Flinders Ranges about 275 kilometres (171 mi) north of the state capital of Adelaide and about 32 kilometres (20 mi) north-east of the municipal seat of Orroroo.

The government town of Johnburgh was proclaimed on land in the cadastral unit of the Hundred of Oladdie on 10 July 1879 while the boundaries for the locality were created on 16 December 1999 which include the site of the Government Town of Johnburgh. The town was named after Major John Jervois who was the second son of William Jervois, the then Governor of South Australia.

The 2016 Australian census which was conducted in August 2016 reports that Johnburgh had a population of 13 people. Data from the 2021 Australian census using the same statistical tool was unable to provide information due to the area having either low or no population.

Land use within the locality is ’primary production’ and is concerned with “agricultural production and the grazing of stock on relatively large holdings.”

Johnburgh is located within the federal division of Grey, the state electoral district of Stuart, and the local government area of the District Council of Orroroo Carrieton.
