= Erskine =

Erskine may refer to:

== Places ==
=== Australia ===
- Erskine, South Australia, a locality
- Erskine, Western Australia, a suburb of Mandurah
- Erskine Island, in the Great Barrier Reef
- Erskine Valley, Lord Howe Island, New South Wales
- Erskine Creek, New South Wales
- Erskine River, Victoria

=== United States ===
- Erskine, Oregon, an unincorporated community
- Erskine, Minnesota, a city
- Erskine, West Virginia, an unincorporated community

=== Elsewhere ===
- Erskine, Alberta, Canada, a hamlet
- Erskine, Renfrewshire, Scotland, a town
- Erskine Glacier, Graham Land, Antarctica

== Schools ==
- Erskine College, Wellington, New Zealand, a Catholic girls' boarding school which closed in 1985
- The Mary Erskine School, Edinburgh, Scotland, an all-girls private day school
- Erskine College, South Carolina, United States, a private Christian college
- Erskine Theological Seminary, South Carolina

== People and fictional characters ==
- Erskine (given name), including a list of people and fictional characters with the given name
- Erskine (surname), including a list of people and fictional characters with the surname
- Clan Erskine, a Lowland Scottish clan

== Titles ==
- Baron Erskine of Restormel Castle in the County of Cornwall, a title in the Peerage of the United Kingdom
- Baron Erskine of Rerrick of Rerrick in Kirkcudbrightshire, a title in the Peerage of the United Kingdom
- Lord Erskine, a Scottish Lordship of Parliament

== Transportation ==
- Erskine (automobile), manufactured by the Studebaker Corporation 1927–1930
- Erskine Bridge, spanning the River Clyde in Scotland
- Erskine Ferry, a former ferry on the River Clyde
- Erskine Road, Singapore

== Other uses ==
- Erskine Barracks, Fugglestone St Peter, Wiltshire, England
- Erskine Memorial Fountain, a public fountain in Atlanta, Georgia, United States
- Erskine Records, a British record label founded by Harry Styles
- Erskine Veterans Charity, a veterans care and support non-profit organisation
- Erskine Flying Fleet football, the football team of Erskine College

== See also ==
- Erskine Park, New South Wales, Australia
- Erskineville, New South Wales, Australia
- Erskine May: Parliamentary Practice, a British parliamentary authority
- Mount Erskine, a neighbourhood of the city of George Town, Penang, Malaysia
