= Erskine, South Australia =

Erskine South Australia
- Coordinates: 32°40′24″S 138°50′20″E
- Population: 4 (SAL 2021)
- Established: 16 December 1999
- Postcode(s): 5422
- Time zone: ACST (UTC+9:30)
  - Summer (DST): ACST (UTC+10:30)
- Location: 250 km (155 mi) N of Adelaide; 22 km (14 mi) NE of Orroroo
- LGA(s): District Council of Orroroo Carrieton
- Region: Yorke and Mid North
- County: Dalhousie
- State electorate(s): Stuart
- Federal division(s): Grey
Mean max temp	Mean min temp	Annual rainfall
21.9 °C; 71 °F	7.3 °C; 45 °F	366.2 mm 14.4 in
Suburbs around Erskine:
Yalpara	Yalpara	Minburra Plain
Orroroo	Erskine	Cavenagh; Dawson
Minvalara	Minvalara	Dawson

Erskine is a locality in the Australian state of South Australia located about 250 kilometres (160 mi) north of the state capital of Adelaide and about 22 kilometres (14 mi) north-east of the municipal seat in Orroroo.

Its boundaries were created on 16 December 1999 for the “long established name” and includes the site of the now-ceased Government Town of Dawlish. Its name is derived from the cadastral unit of the Hundred of Erskine which it shares with the locality of Orroroo and which was named after William West-Erskine, a former member of the South Australian Parliament.

Land use within the locality is ’primary production’ and is concerned with “agricultural production and the grazing of stock on relatively large holdings.” Some land in its south has been gazetted as a protected area known as the Black Rock Conservation Park.

Erskine is located within the federal division of Grey, the state electoral district of Stuart and the local government area of the District Council of Orroroo Carrieton.

== See also ==
- Erskine (disambiguation)
