= Walloway, South Australia =

Locality on the former Peterborough–Quorn railway line in South Australia

Walloway
- Town
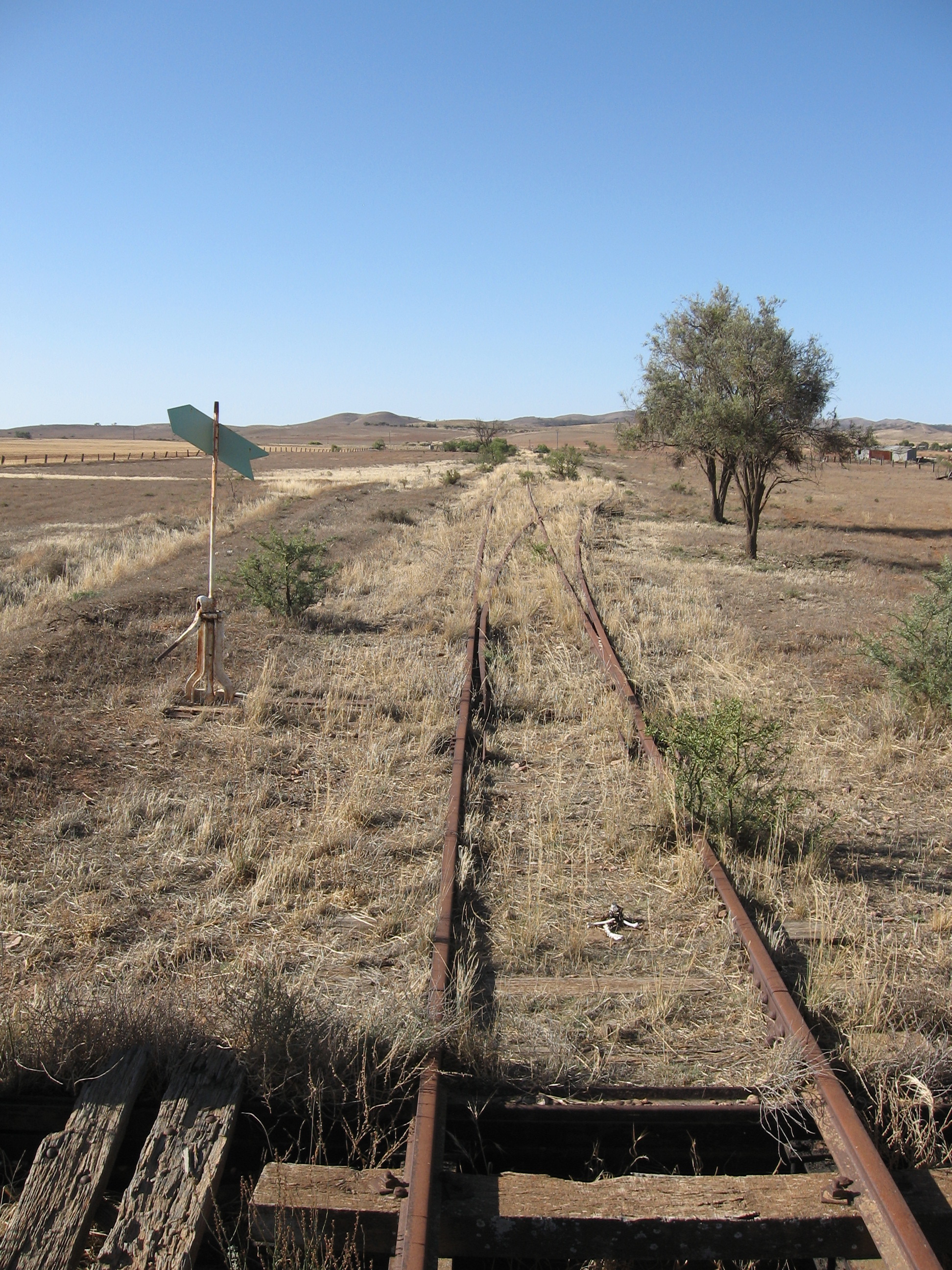
- The Peterborough–Quorn railway line, which closed in 1988, at Walloway locality in 2006. Two years later the rails were removed.

- Coordinates: 32.63668843°S 138.58746293°E
- Country: Australia
- State: South Australia
- Region: Yorke and Mid North
- LGA: District Council of Orroroo Carrieton
- Location: 255 km (158 mi) N of Adelaide; 10 km (6.2 mi) N of Orroroo
- Established: 1881

Government
  - State electorate: Stuart
  - Federal division: Grey

Population
  - Total: 8 (SAL 2021)
- Time zone: UTC+9:30 (ACST)
  - Summer (DST): UTC+10:30 (ACST)
- Postcode: 5431
- County: Dalhousie
- Mean max temp: 21.9 °C (71.4 °F)
- Mean min temp: 7.3 °C (45.1 °F)
- Annual rainfall: 365.2 mm (14.38 in)
Localities around Walloway
Eurelia	Eurelia	Johnburgh
Coomooroo	Walloway	Johnburgh; Orroroo
Coomooroo	Coomooroo; Orroroo	Orroroo
- Coordinates; Locations; Climate; Adjoining localities

Walloway (formerly Rye) is a locality in the Australian state of South Australia located about 255 kilometres (158 mi) north of the state capital of Adelaide and about 10 kilometres (6.2 mi) north of the municipal seat of Orroroo.

The principal land use within the locality is primary production.

== History ==
The Government Town of Walloway was surveyed in November 1881 and proclaimed with the name Rye on 30 March 1882. It was renamed as Walloway in 1940 in order to match the Wallaway railway station, which had been so named since 1851. The government town officially ceased to exist on 30 June 1988.

Being spread over the boundary joining the Hundred of Coomooroo and Hundred of Walloway, the local government first was established for the town in 1888 with the formation of the District Council of Orroroo. From 1997, the hundreds of Coomooroo and Wallaway, among thirteen hundreds in the area, became part of the larger District Council of Orroroo Carrieton.

Boundaries for the locality were formalised in December 1999 (including "the ceased Government Town of Walloway") and it was formally given the "long established name" of Wallaway, which is derived from a "native name for a large plain frequented by wild turkeys."

== Train crash ==
On 16 November 1901 a northbound train with an engine driver and fireman aboard, carrying flour and copper ore, and a southbound train also with an engine driver and a fireman aboard, carrying 170 bullocks consigned by Sir Sydney Kidman, collided at Walloway. The firemen from both locomotives were killed; one of the drivers was seriously injured. Many cattle were also lost. A monument was erected at the site in 2001 commemorating the event.

== Governance ==
Walloway is located within the federal division of Grey, the state electoral district of Stuart and the local government area of the District Council of Orroroo Carrieton.
