= Mulga-eucalypt line =

The mulga-eucalypt line, or mulga-eucalypt boundary line, marks a boundary between Acacia-dominated shrublands and Eucalyptus-dominated open woodlands across Western Australia. It runs across the north of the Eastern Goldfields, and through the northeastern segment of Charles Darwin Reserve, from Seven Mile Well to Christmas Bore.

Its course runs along the isohyet marking 250 mm (10 in) annual rainfall.

Ferdinand von Mueller predicted its existence in 1883, and it was subsequently mapped by explorers and botanists Woodward, Diels, Clarke, Gardner, Burbidge and Beard.

== See also ==
- Goyder's line (a similar boundary in South Australia)
