= Eurelia =

Eurelia South Australia
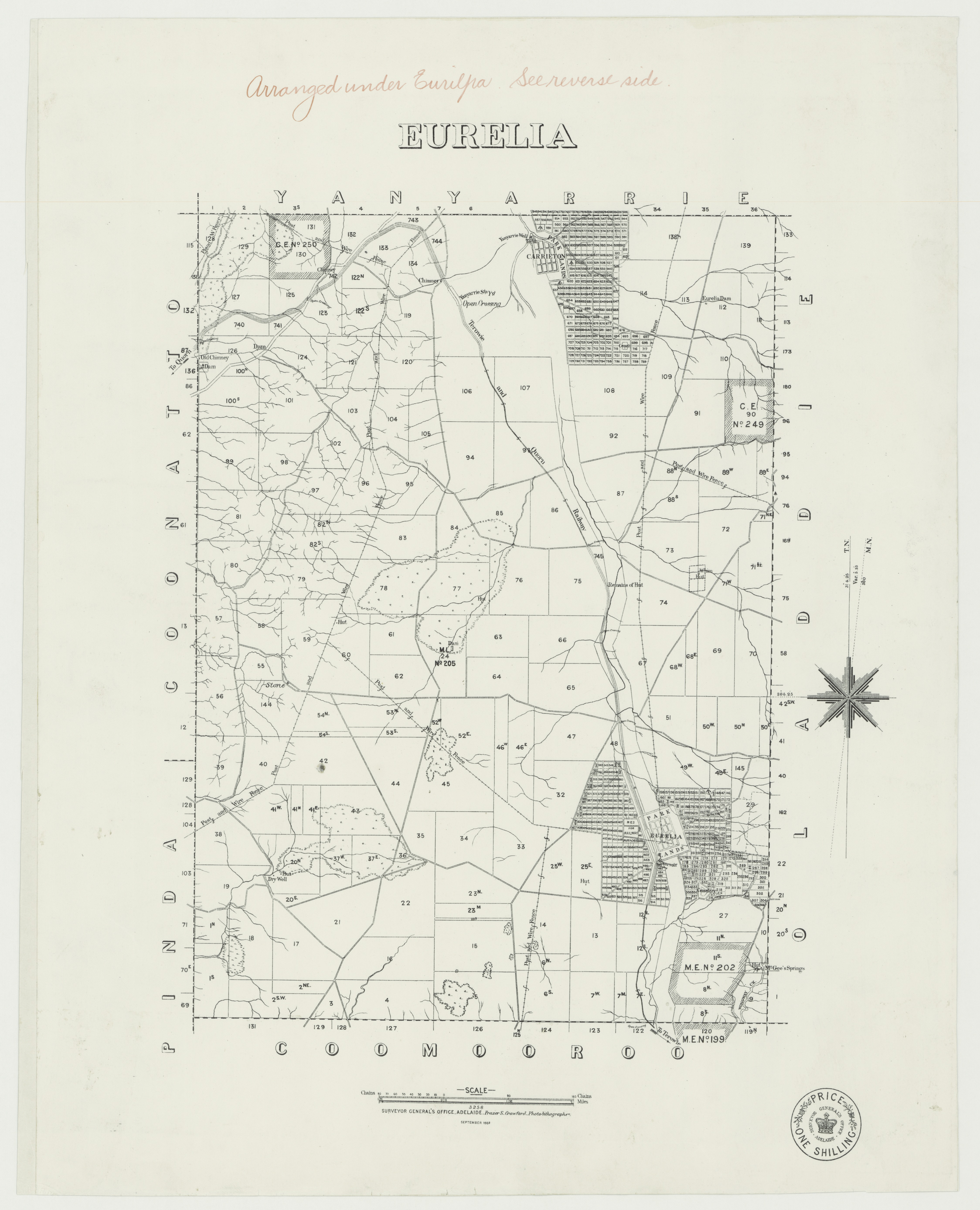
- Hundred of Eurelia, 1889, which shows the proposed extent of the government town in the bottom right hand corner

- Coordinates: 32°33′16″S 138°33′41″E
- Population: 21 (SAL 2021)
- Established: 12 September 1878 (town); 16 December 1999 (locality)
- Postcode(s): 5431
- Elevation: 525 m (1,722 ft)(railway station)
- Time zone: ACST (UTC+9:30)
  - Summer (DST): ACDT (UTC+10:30)
- Location: 264 km (164 mi) N of Adelaide; 20 km (12 mi) N of Orroroo
- LGA(s): District Council of Orroroo Carrieton
- Region: Yorke and Mid North
- County: Dalhousie
- State electorate(s): Stuart
- Federal division(s): Grey
Mean max temp	Mean min temp	Annual rainfall
21.9 °C; 71 °F	7.3 °C; 45 °F	366.2 mm 14.4 in
Localities around Eurelia:
Moockra	Moockra; Carrieton; Johnburgh	Johnburgh
Moockra; Hammond	Eurelia	Johnburgh
Coomooroo	Walloway	Johnburgh
- Footnotes: Locations; Adjoining localities

Eurelia is a town and locality in the Australian state of South Australia located on the east side of the Flinders Ranges about 264 kilometres (164 mi) north of the state capital of Adelaide and about 20 kilometres (12 mi) from the municipal seat of Orroroo.

The town was surveyed in July 1878 and was gazetted as a government town on 12 September 1878 with its name being derived from the cadastral unit of the Hundred of Eurelia. The locality's boundaries were created on 16 December 1999 for the “long established name” and includes the site of the Government Town of Eurelia.

Eurelia's name comes from the local Jadliaura language and translates to "place of the ear". It is thought that local Dreamtime stories associated with the Ranges locates Eurelia as an "ear" of a prostrate man. The pronunciation of the town's name has given rise to some long-standing jokes. One joke has two railway porters at each end of the platform and as each train pulls in, one would call out "You're a liar! You're a liar", and the other would reply "You really are! You really are!". (I.e. the town's name sounds like either "you're a liar" or "you really are", depending on which syllable the stress falls). The "correct" pronunciation is "you really are"

The District Council of Carrieton, based in adjacent Carrieton, was known as the District Council of Eurelia for the first six years of its existence, from 1888 to 1894.

Land use within the locality is ’primary production’ and is concerned with “agricultural production and the grazing of stock on relatively large holdings.”

Eurelia is located within the federal division of Grey, the state electoral district of Stuart and the local government area of the District Council of Orroroo Carrieton.

== Railways ==
Eurelia is located on route of the former Peterborough–Quorn railway line, built in 1881, and ceased regular use by the 1980s. It then became the northern terminus of operations of the Steamtown Peterborough Railway Preservation Society running trains from Peterborough between 1981 and 2002.

== Dams ==
Eurelia had two dams. The first built when the railway was constructed by C & E Miller. The original dam held 20,000,000 imperial gallons (9.1×10^{10} ml). This dam was later supplemented by a new dam of the same capacity which was built to the north of the original dam, with the intent that the old dam would act as a settling pond. Construction started in 1948 and was completed in 1952. The dam remained empty until 1958 when, after heavy rains in the region, both dams filled.

Water from the dams was shipped across the South Australian Railway system during times of drought.
