= District Council of Orroroo Carrieton =

Coordinates: 32°44′03″S 138°36′49″E

- Local government area
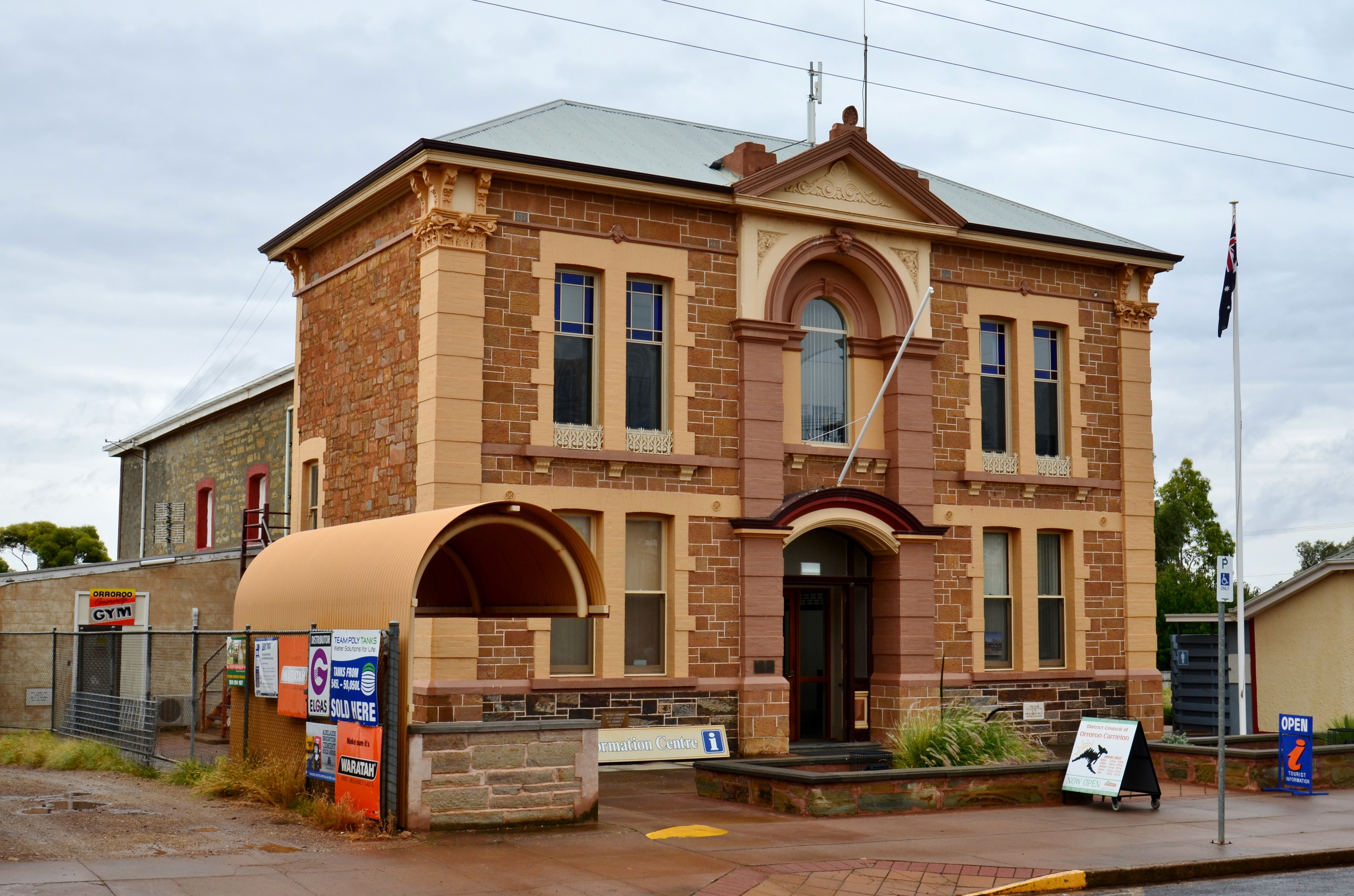
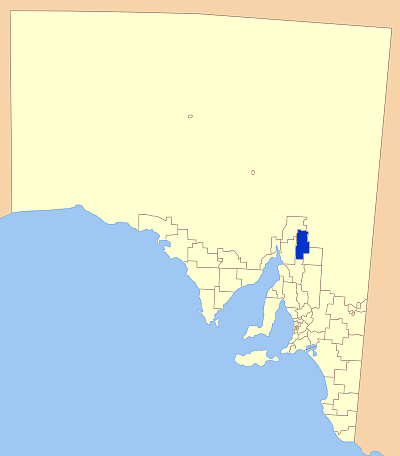
- The District Council office, Orroroo Location of District Council of Orroroo Carrieton
- Interactive map of District Council of Orroroo Carrieton
- Country: Australia
- State: South Australia
- Region: Yorke and Mid North
- Established: 1997
- Council seat: Orroroo

Government
  - Mayor: Kathie Bowman
  - State electorate: Stuart
  - Federal division: Grey

Area
  - Total: 3,300 km^{2} (1,300 sq mi)

Population
  - Total: 874 (LGA 2021)
- Website: District Council of Orroroo Carrieton
LGAs around District Council of Orroroo Carrieton
| Flinders Ranges Council | Flinders Ranges Council | Outback Communities Authority |
| District Council of Mount Remarkable | District Council of Orroroo Carrieton |
| | Northern Areas Council | District Council of Peterborough |

The District Council of Orroroo Carrieton is a local government area in the Yorke and Mid North region of South Australia. The principal towns are Orroroo and Carrieton; it also includes the localities of Belton, Black Rock, Coomooroo, Erskine, Eurelia, Johnburgh, Minburra, Pekina, Walloway, Yalpara and Yanyarrie, and part of Cradock, Hammond, Moockra, Morchard, Tarcowie and Yatina.

It was created in 1997 from the merger of the District Council of Carrieton and the District Council of Orroroo.

== Elected members ==
| Ward | Councillor | Notes |
|---|---|---|
| Unsubdivided | Kathie Bowman | Mayor |
| Unsubdivided | Malcolm Byerlee | |
| Unsubdivided | Grant Chapman | Deputy Mayor |
| Unsubdivided | Joylene Ford | |
| Unsubdivided | Ralph Goehring | |
| Unsubdivided | Colin Parkyn | |
| Unsubdivided | Ahmad Ramadan | |
