= Hundred of Yalpara =

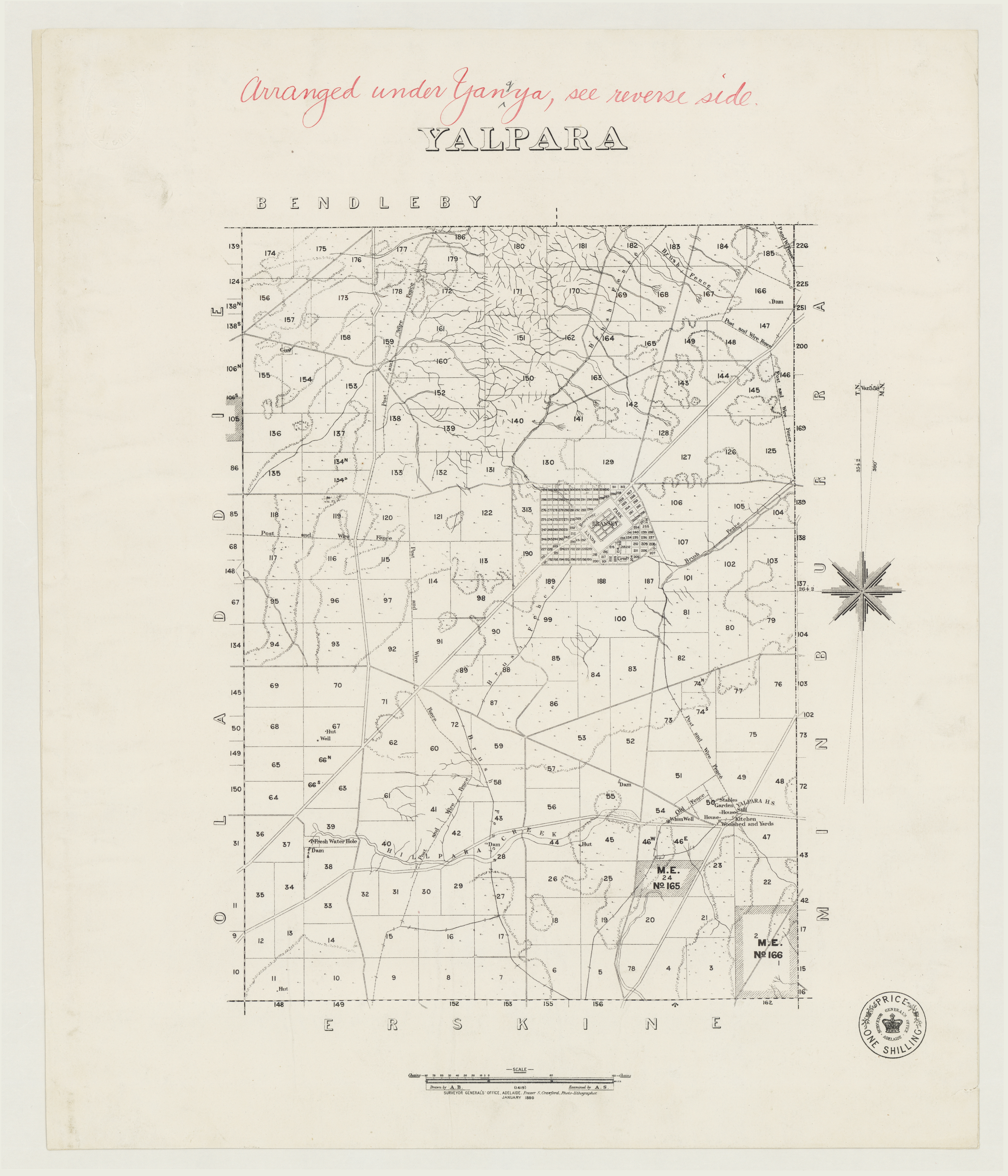
Hundred of Yalpara, 1880

The Hundred of Yalpara is a hundred in the County of Dalhousie, South Australia. The hundred was established 1876 and a government town called Brassey was laid out, though it never developed into a township. The hundred is largely occupied by the locality of Yalpara but a portion of Minburra crosses the western border.

== See also ==
- Yalpara, South Australia
