= Dawlish, South Australia =

Former town in South Australia

Coordinates: 21°22′S 149°09′E

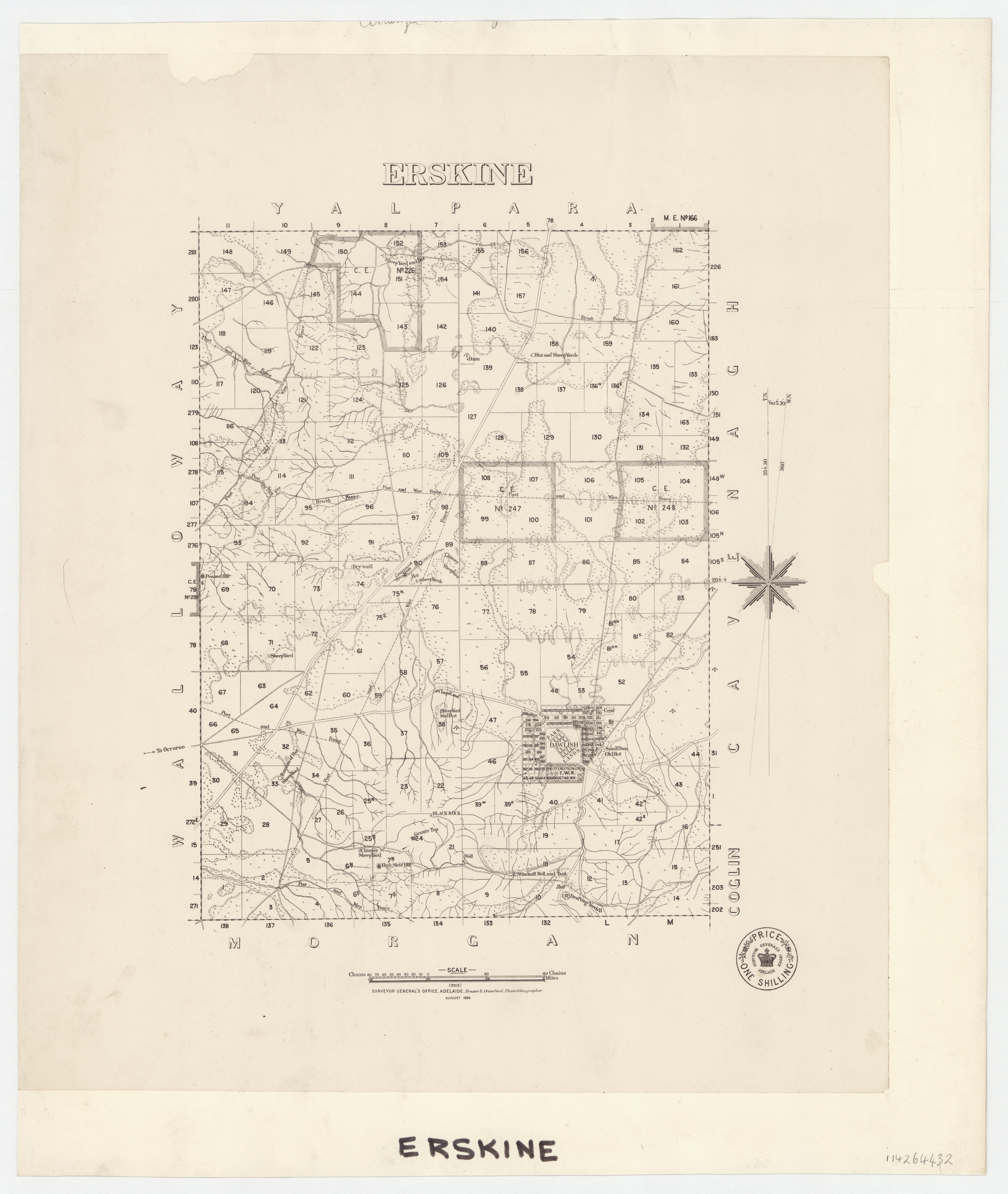
Dawlish in the Hundred of Erskine, 1886, Source: State Library of South Australia

Dawlish is a former government town whose site is located in the locality of Erskine north of Peterborough, South Australia.

The area is arid and although a town was laid out, on 8 June 1882 but it never developed. "In 1964, as there was no demand for allotments, the few that had been sold were acquired compulsorily by the Crown and reverted back [sic] to broad acres."

The name comes from Devon, England, where in the Domesday Book the Town of Dawlish was recorded as Doelis or ‘hallowed place’
