= Albert MacDonald (cyclist) =

Australian telegraphist (1870–1924)

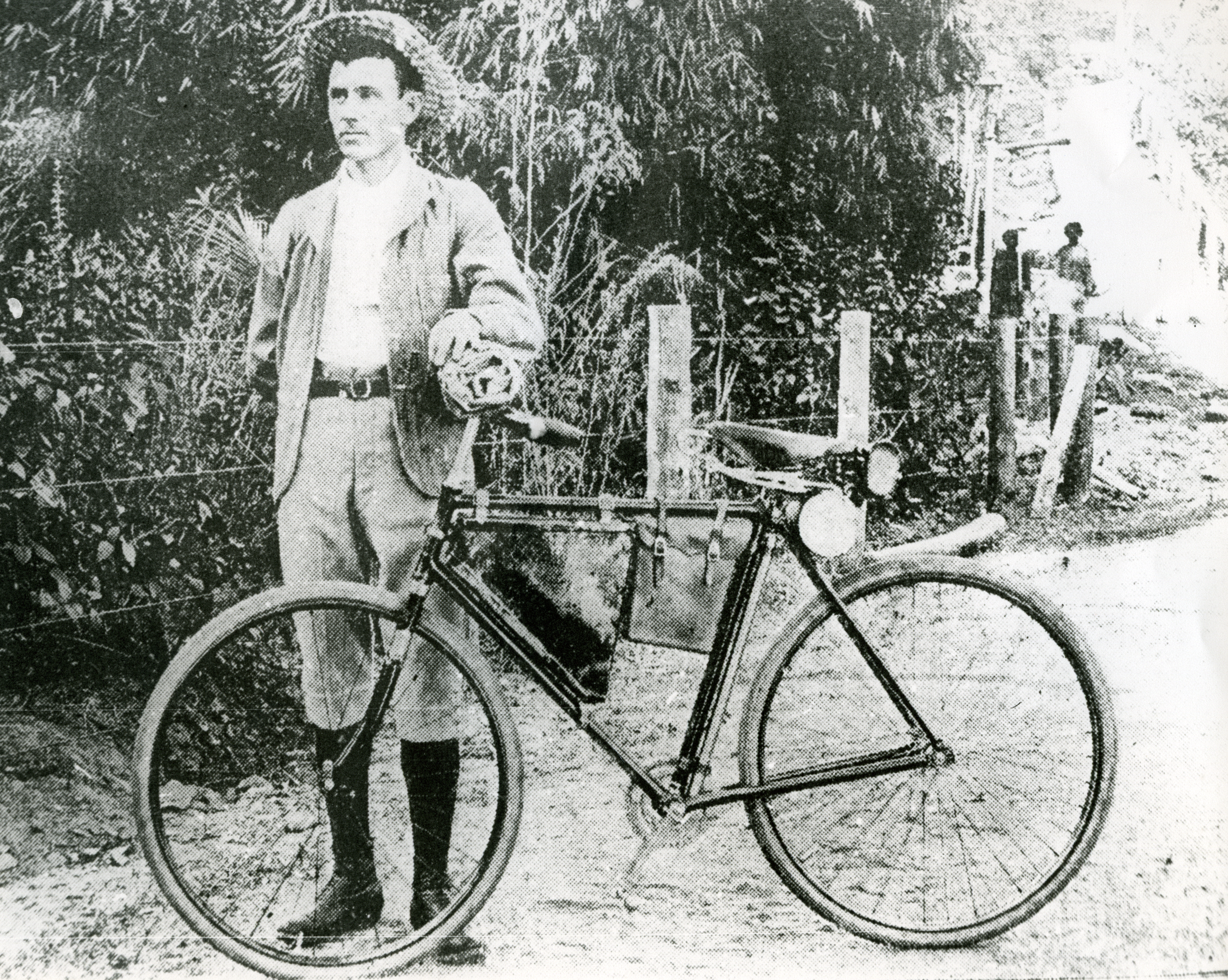
Albert MacDonald and his bike, 1898

Albert MacDonald (17 December 1870 – 25 October 1924) was a telegraphist on the Australian Overland Telegraph Line and cyclist who broke the continental record in 1898 when he cycled from Darwin to Melbourne in 33 days. He later invented the Pendograph.

== Early life ==
MacDonald was born in Clare, South Australia and was the son of David and Christina MacDonald and his father worked as a tailor. When MacDonald was a small child the family moved to Orroroo, South Australia where he attended school. After completing school he worked as a messenger for the Post and Telegraph Services on 4 August 1885 until, in 1888, he began working as a junior telegraph officer first at Orrorroo (1888–1889), Melrose (1890–1891) and then at the Central Telegraph Office in Adelaide (1892–1893).

== Life in the Northern Territory and cycling ==
In March 1893 MacDonald transferred to the Northern Territory where he worked at the Port Darwin Telegraph Station in Darwin where he worked between 1893 and 1895 and then again in 1898. In between these two dates MacDonald worked at the Powell Creek Telegraph Station. He became involved in the community in Darwin and was a part of the Literary and Debating Society as well as being a prominent athlete who was involved in running and, most notably, cycling.

In August 1898 MacDonald set out to cycle from Darwin to Adelaide and beat the record which was then at 60 days and, in order to obtain sponsorship, he then extended that journey to Melbourne. His sponsor, the Austral Cycling Company, gave their support with the condition that he complete this complete journey in 5 weeks (35 days) or less. Their support was on a 'no result, no pay' basis.

MacDonald set out from Darwin on 22 August 1898 and reached Adelaide on 19 September, a time of 28 days, and was the fourth person to complete this route and he continued on to Melbourne with a complete journey time of 33 days. His longest cycling day was between Wilmington and Adelaide, a distance of 301 kilometres (187 mi) and, between Adelaide and Melbourne, he averaged 125 kilometres (78 mi) a day. The total length of the trip was, just over, 3,000 kilometres (1,900 mi).

Following the completion of this journey a pamphlet called 'The Book of Albert MacDonald of Orroroo' (1898) which included photographs taken by Maurice William Holtze and Francis James Gillen.

== Later career ==
MacDonald did not return to the Northern Territory after completing his cycling trip and, instead, began working as a telegraphist in South Australia again. He was also active in the South Australian Post and Telegraph Association and acted as their secretary and, in this, role he presented their submissions into the Royal Commission on postal services (1908–1910).

In 1907 MacDonald also travelled to the United States in order to learn about improvements which had been made there in order to reduce repetitive strain injuries; particularly as they related to vibratory mechanical transmitters. Based on this trip MacDonald developed the Pendograph which used a pendulum type vibrator rather than a horizonal vibrator, which he patented on 28 April 1908. This invention claimed to lessen repetitive strain by around 75% and was sold throughout Australia.

In 1915 he became a postal inspector.

== Personal life ==
On 18 April 1899 MacDonald married Lillian Maude Turler in Morphett Vale, South Australia and they had four children together Trempice, Stewart, Nancy and Betty.

After Lillian's death MacDonald married Edith Holmes on 24 June 1924.

== Death ==
MacDonald died on 23 October 1924 on West Terrace, Adelaide just a few moths after his second marriage.
