= Orroroo, South Australia =

Orroroo South Australia
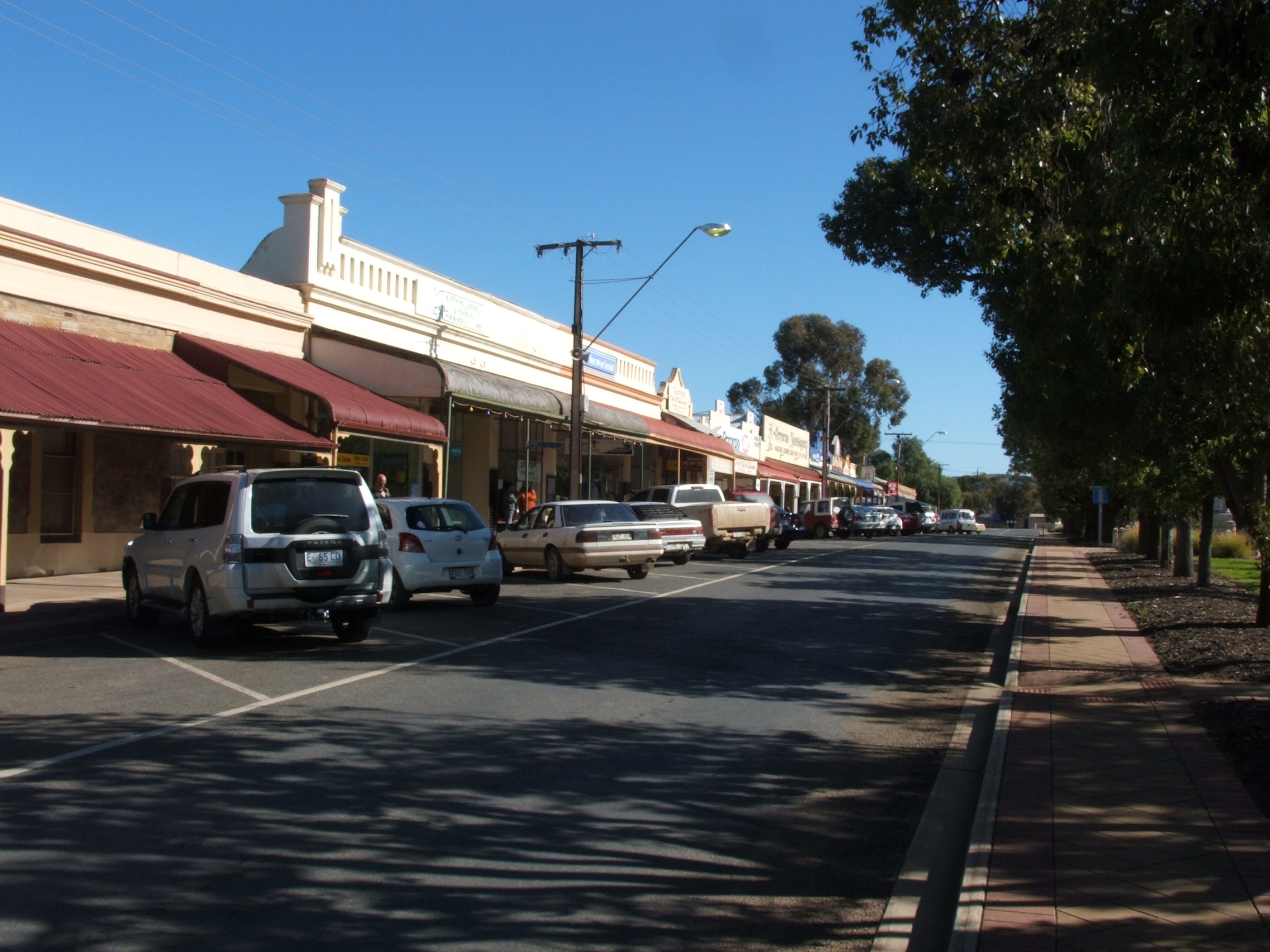
- The main street of Orroroo

- Coordinates: 32°44′09″S 138°36′44″E
- Population: 537 ('urban centre & locality') (2016 census); 610 ('state suburb') (2016 census)
- Established: 1875 (town); 1999 (locality)
- Postcode(s): 5431
- Elevation: 428 m (1,404 ft)
- Location: 270 km (168 mi) N of Adelaide; 120 km (75 mi) NE of Port Pirie; 100 km (62 mi) NW of Port Augusta
- LGA(s): District Council of Orroroo Carrieton
- Region: Yorke and Mid North
- County: Dalhousie
- State electorate(s): Stuart
- Federal division(s): Grey
Localities around Orroroo:
Walloway	Johnburgh	Minburra, Yalpara
Coomooroo	Orroroo	Erskine
Pekina	Black Rock	Minvalara
- Footnotes: Adjoining localities

Orroroo is a town in the Yorke and Mid North region of South Australia. At the 2016 census, the locality of Orroroo had a population of 610 while its urban centre had a population of 537. The Wilmington-Ucolta Road passes through here, intersecting with the RM Williams Way which leads to the Birdsville and Oodnadatta Tracks. The Peterborough–Quorn railway line extended from Peterborough to Orroroo also in 1881 and Quorn in 1882, connecting with the new Central Australia Railway from Port Augusta. These railways have now been abandoned. Orroroo is situated near Goyder's Line, a line drawn up in 1865 by Surveyor General Goyder which he believed indicated the edge of the area suitable for agriculture.

== History ==
Prior to European settlement, Orroroo was the home of the Ngadjuri Aboriginal people whose domain was the area to the east of the Flinders Rangers. The name Orroroo was thought to be a form of onomatopoeia in imitation of wind blowing through acacia trees. According to J. Gray, it actually meant 'early start', referring to the fact that the Ngadjuri, who usually camped at Pekina Creek, would move to camp at the Orroroo river the night before hunting for kangaroos, which would come up to the river at that point and thus allow them to make an early start at dawn for the hunt. Aboriginal origins, but the true meaning of the word is uncertain. The name was first used by an early pioneer who conducted a nearby coaching house which served travellers on the Burra-Blinman track.

In 1844, the first Europeans to settle, John and James Chambers, took up the Pekina Run which covered 320 square miles. They did not receive any rain during the 17 months that they lived there. As a result of this drought, they sold the Pekina Run for £30.

Charlie Easther settled in Orroroo during 1864 and opened up an eating house that became a popular stopping point for the drovers and bullockies who travelled through the area. The town was surveyed in 1875, when Solly's Hut, a clay-pugged log structure, was constructed as the town's first house and is now used as a museum. In September 1875, the town was officially named by George Goyder following the suggestion made by Charlie Easther. The first land sales were made in May 1876. The town was granted its own local council, the District Council of Orroroo, in 1887 (taking effect in 1888), and the town's council offices were constructed in 1888. The District Council of Orroroo would survive until 1997, when it was merged to create the District Council of Orroroo Carrieton.

On 24 August 1923, 230-volt electricity was connected to the town by Cr Martin Redden, Chairman of the District Council, in the presence of a large crowd. On 4 July 1962, the power house engines were shut down and the town was connected to the ETSA 240-volt grid.

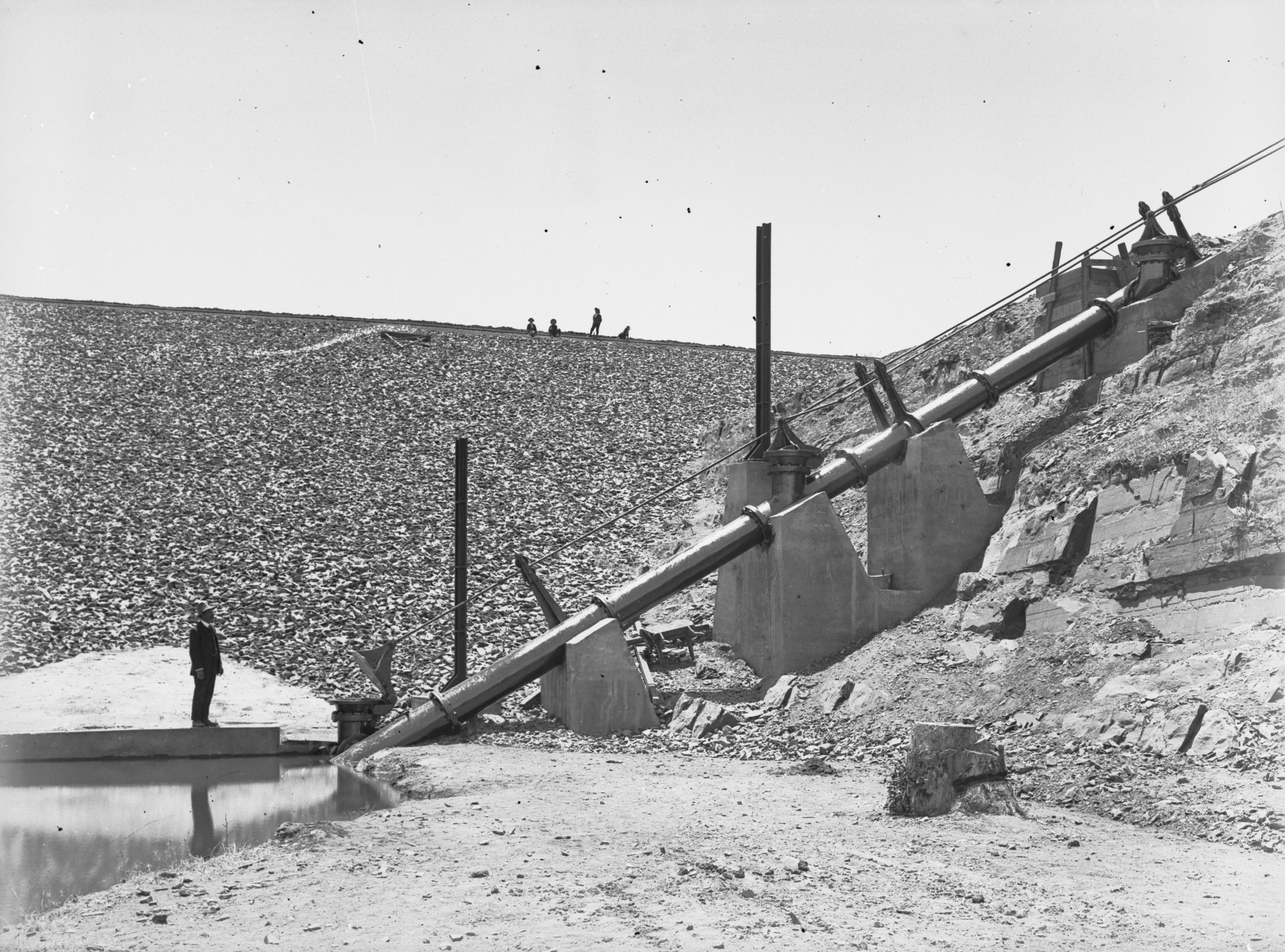
Pekina Creek dam circa 1906

An early irrigation scheme was formed after damming the Pekina Creek and creating the Pekina reservoir. Water from here was supplied to over 50 dairy farms. Orroroo had its own flour mill, several bakeries, carriage manufacturer and a butter factory, which still stands.

Orroroo is the service centre for a predominantly farming community with the main products being wheat, sheep, cattle, pigs and a kangaroo processor.

A local curiosity is nearby, called "Magnetic Hill", which is a gravity hill optical illusion.

== Railways ==
The town was connected by the Peterborough–Quorn railway line to Peterborough and Quorn in September 1881, and was served by a Class 1 station and a large Goods Shed. During 1962, concrete grain silos were built in the Yard. these provided the bulk of traffic until the railway was closed in 1987

Orroroo was the last attended station on the railway; staff were withdrawn and the station operated as "unattended" from August 1981.

Passenger services were discontinued during 1969, when the South Australian Railways withdrew the railcar service.

Grain continued to be hauled by rail from Orroroo until 1987, when all rail services were withdrawn by Australian National. Steamtown, a railway preservation group based at Peterborough, operated passenger trains for tourists to Orroroo and Eurelia until 2002. The railway line was eventually removed in 2008.

== Road transport ==
Orroroo is on the south–north RM Williams Way (route B80) connecting Clare to Hawker and the west–east route B56 connecting the Port Augusta to Broken Hill.

== Origin of the name "Orroroo" ==
"Orroroo" was officially named by a C.J. Easther, an early settler in the region. The Register of 16 November 1926 gives two still further alternatives, stating that Orroroo was the name of an Aboriginal girl who lived on nearby Pekina station, and that the town was for some reason named in honour of this girl, but also noting that others have suggested the name derivates from an Aboriginal word meaning 'dust', 'drift', or 'a windy locality'. It is true that in the Advertiser of 9 January 1903, it is said that orroroo means wind in "the native language". In the Advertiser of 15 August 1908, a still further derivation is suggested by a Gustav Degenhardt, who claims the name comes from the Aboriginal name for a nearby creek, Oorooroo. Degenhardt resided in Orroroo from at least as early as 1880 (five years after Easther named the town), so it may be that he had first-hand knowledge of Easther's reasons for so naming the town.

== Orroroo Fire Service ==
The Orroroo Country Fire Service (CFS) is the volunteer fire service of Orroroo. They are part of the Black Rock CFS Group.

== Notable residents ==
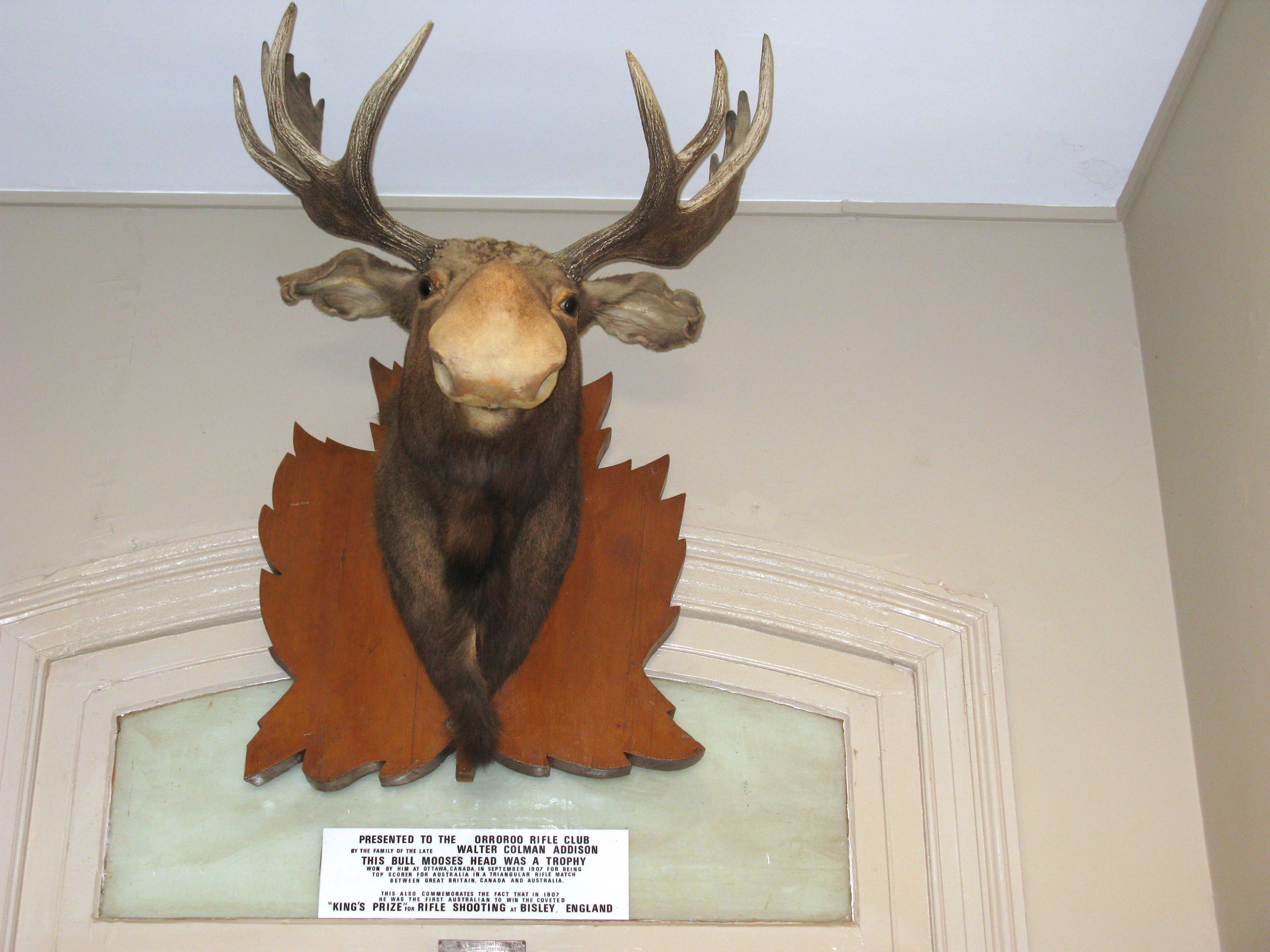
Trophy won by W. C. Addison in Ottawa, Canada

- Arthur Richman Addison MLC (1842–1915) and son Walter C. Addison, a champion rifle shooter, were longtime residents.
- Hooper Brewster-Jones, an Australian composer, born in Orroroo
- Rex Ingamells, poet, and founder of the Jindyworobak Movement, born in Orroroo.
- Albert MacDonald (cyclist), a cyclist, telegraphist and inventor, spent much of his childhood and early life in Orroroo.
- Albert "Ab" Macdonald, racehorse trainer, born in Orroroo.
- Fleur McDonald, author and founder of Breaking the Silence, born in Orroroo.
- Professor Harry Medlin (1920–2013), Deputy Vice-Chancellor of University of Adelaide 1978–1997
- Luke Tapscott, former footballer with Melbourne in the Australian Football League, born in Orroroo.
- Peter Timmens, racehorse trainer, born in Orroroo.
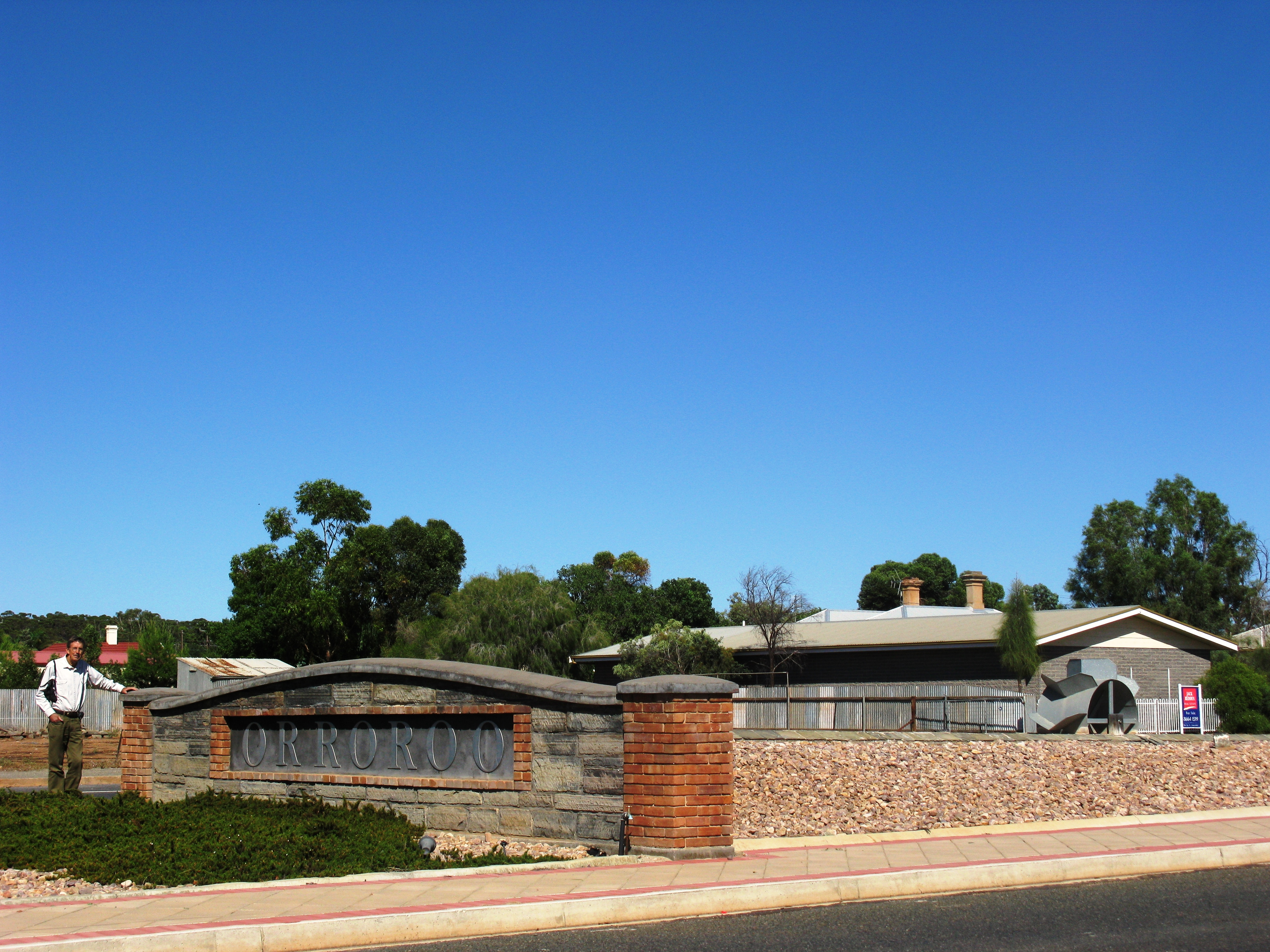
Town entrance

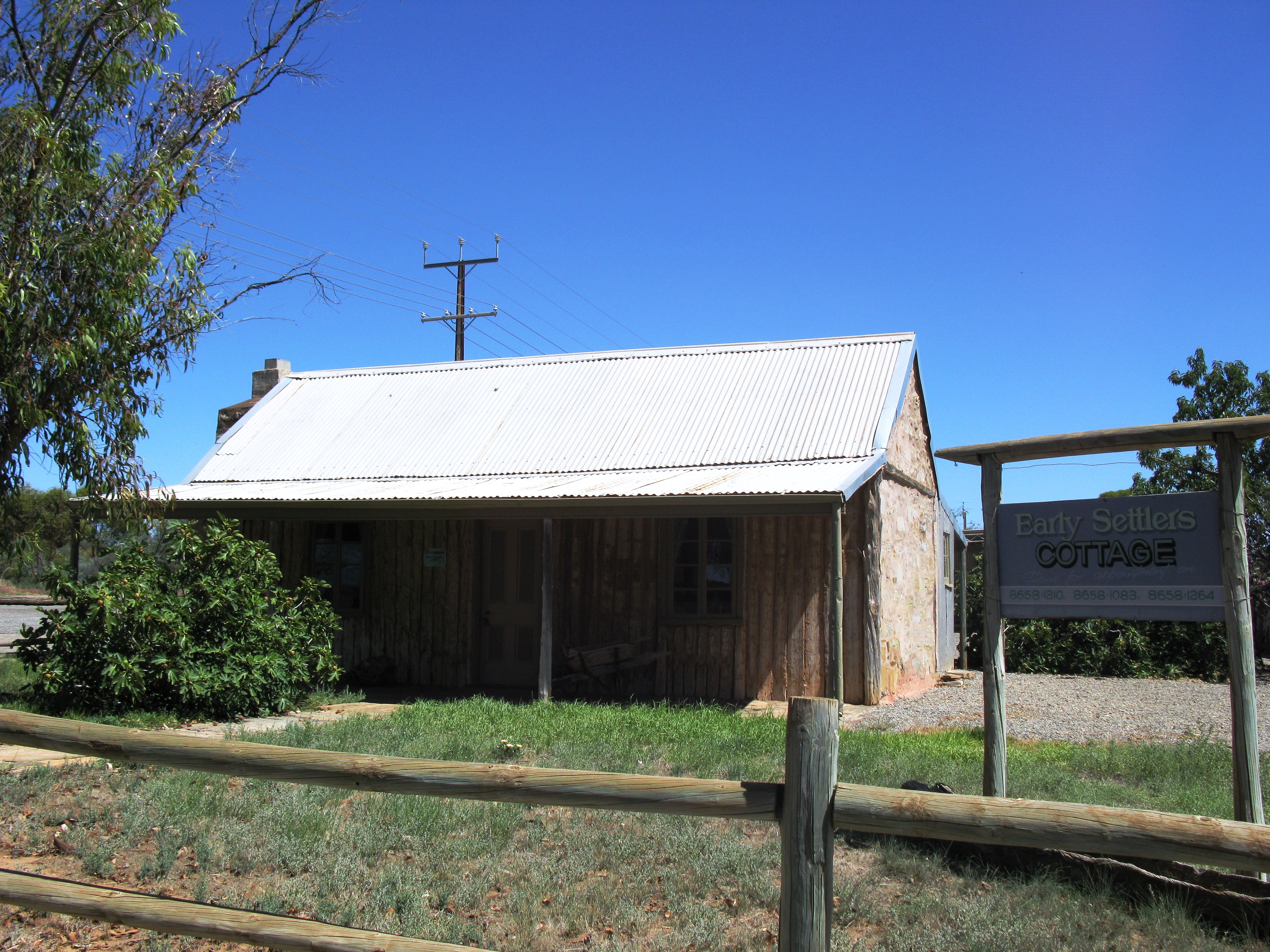
Settler's cottage

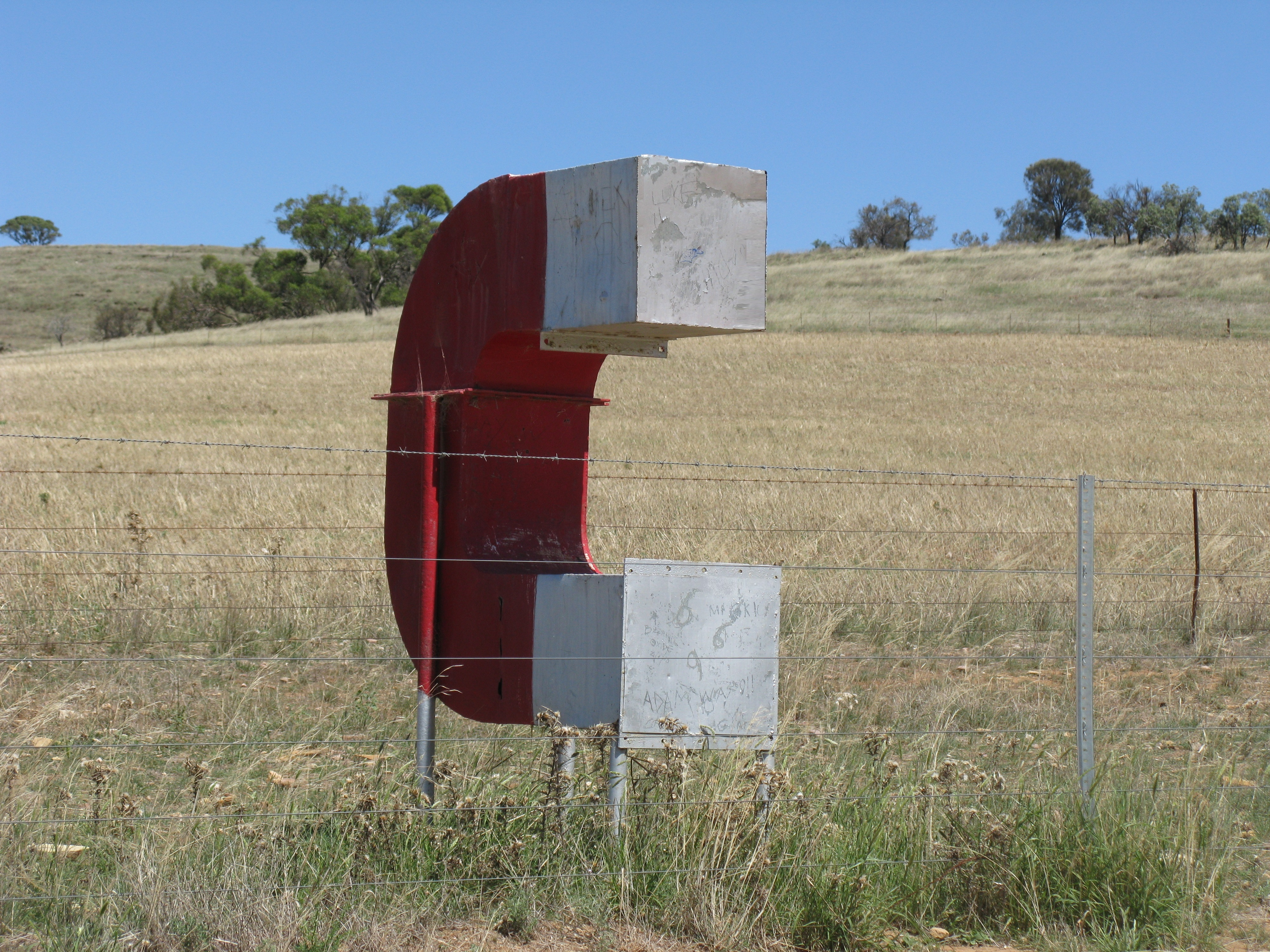
The big magnet

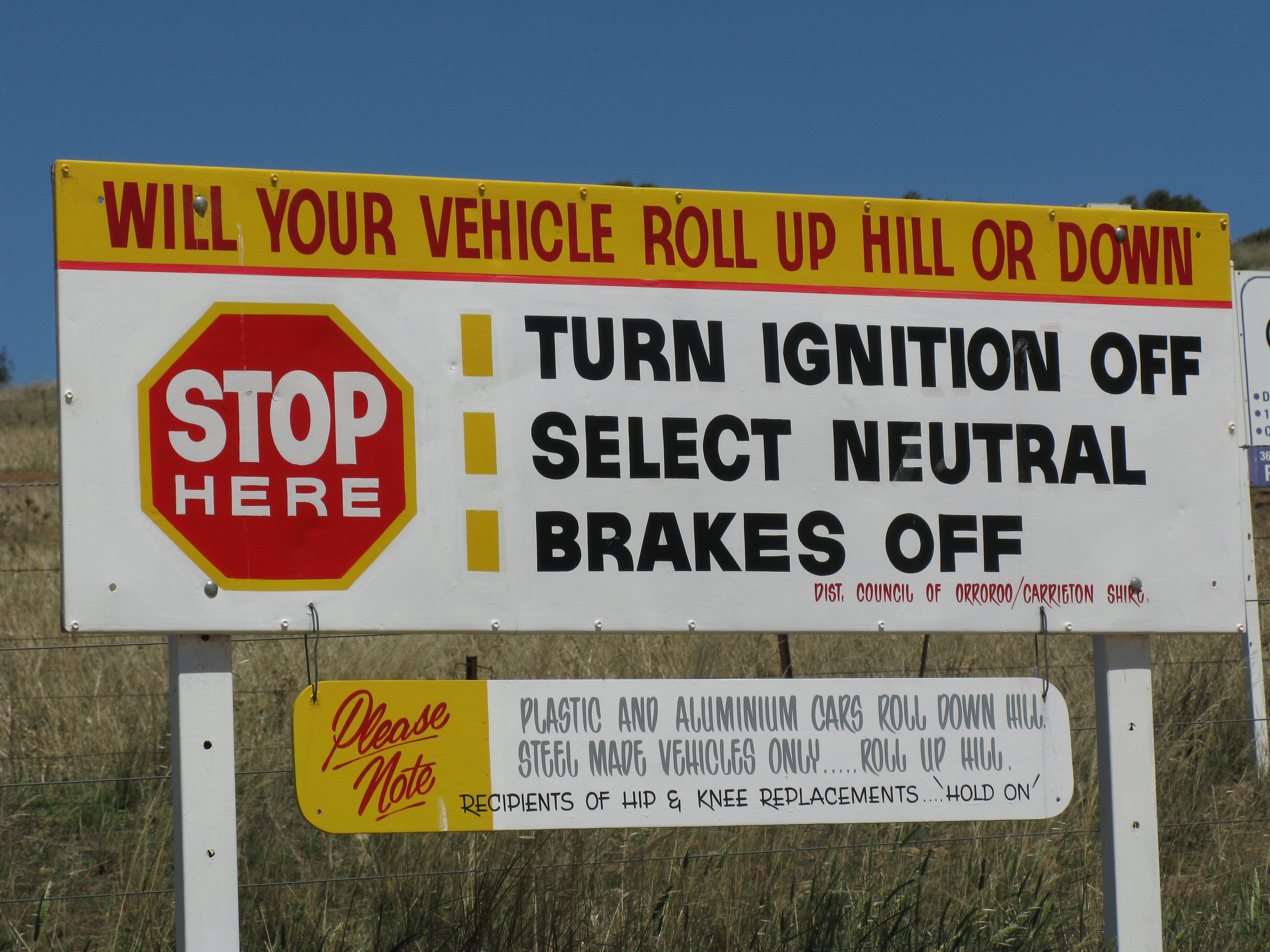
Sign at "Magnetic Hill"
