= Edeowie =

Edeowie may refer to:

- Edeowie, South Australia, a ghost town
- Edeowie glass, a natural glass found in South Australia
- Edeowie Station, a pastoral lease in South Australia
- Hundred of Edeowie, a cadastral unit in South Australia
