= County of Hanson =

Hanson
- Cadastral division
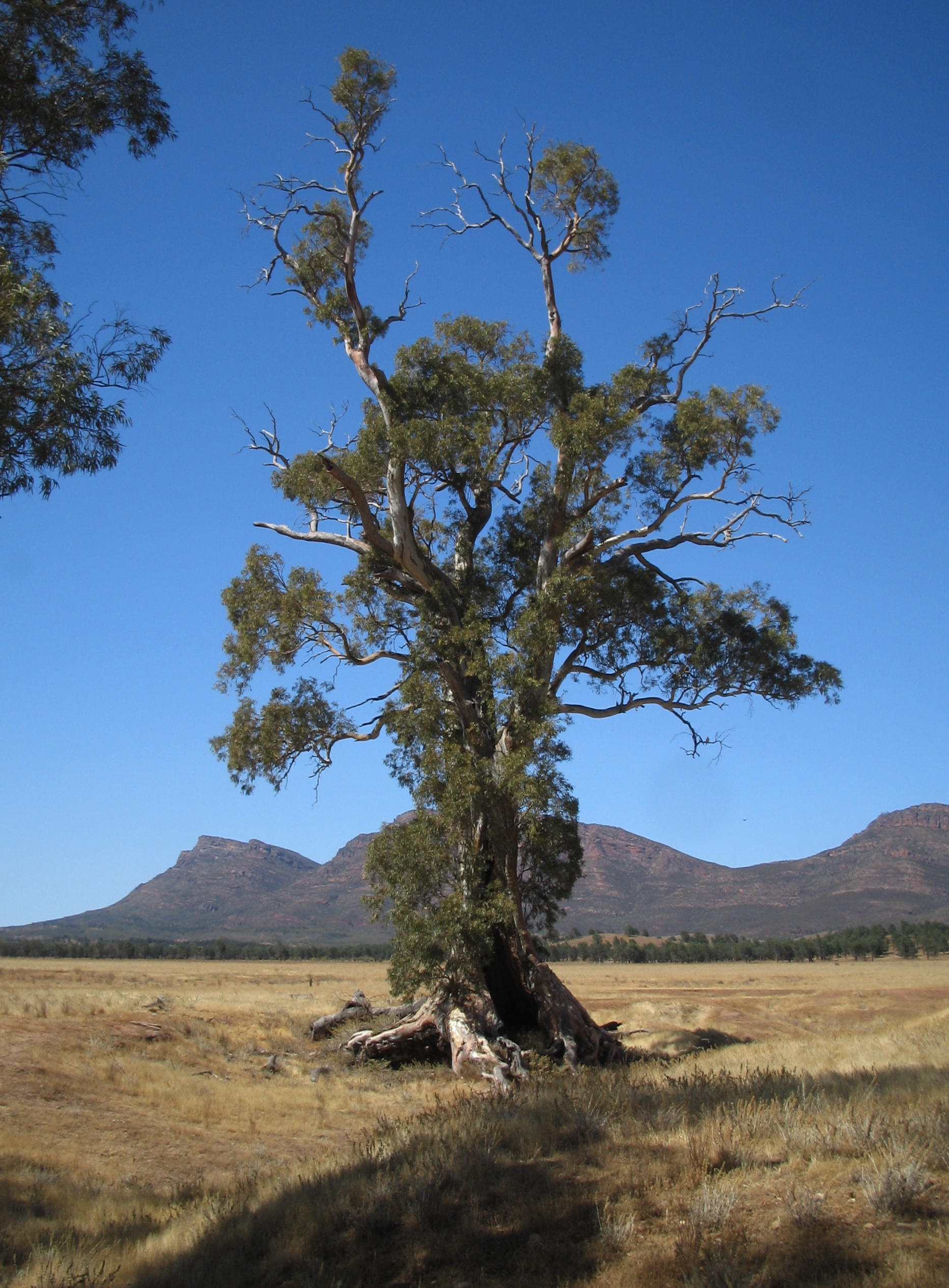
- The Cazneaux Tree is located within the County of Hanson

- Coordinates: 31°44′23″S 138°46′20″E
- Country: Australia
- State: South Australia
- Region: Far North
- LGA: Flinders Ranges Council Pastoral Unincorporated Area
- Location: 36 km (22 mi) E of Hawker; 127 km (79 mi) NE of Port Augusta
- Established: 18 January 1877

Area
  - Total: 3,280 km^{2} (1,265 sq mi)
Lands administrative divisions around Hanson
Taunton	Taunton	-
Blachford	Hanson	Derby
Newcastle	Granville	Lytton
- Location; Adjoining counties

County of Hanson is a cadastral unit located in the Australian state of South Australia that covers land in the Flinders Ranges immediately east of the town of Hawker. It was proclaimed on 20 July 1877 and is named after Sir Richard Davies Hanson who served as Premier, Administrator and Chief Justice of South Australia. It has been partially divided in the following sub-units of hundreds – Adams, Arkaba, French, Moralana and Warcowie.

== Description ==
The County of Hanson is located on the east side of the Flinders Ranges to the immediate east of the town of Hawker for a distance of about 62 kilometres (39 mi) from its western boundary and for about 53 kilometres (33 mi) from its northern boundary. It is bounded by the following counties - Taunton to the north and north-west, Blachford to the west, Newcastle to the south-west, Granville to the south, Lytton to the south-east and Derby to the east.

The county is served by one principal road, the Flinders Ranges Way, which passes through the county in a north–south direction from the town of Hawker in the south entering via the west side of the Hundred of Arkaba and exiting via the Hundred of Warcowie on its way to the town centre in Blinman in the north.

The county is located both within the local government area of the Flinders Ranges Council which occupies the county's south-west corner and the state's Pastoral Unincorporated Area which occupies the remainder of the county.

The county includes the southern end of the Ikara-Flinders Ranges National Park on its northern side. Features such as Wilpena Pound and St Mary Peak are within the boundary of the county.

== History ==
The County of Hanson was proclaimed on 20 July 1877 and is named after Sir Richard Davies Hanson who served as Premier of South Australia from 1857 to 1861, the Chief Justice of South Australia from 1861 to 1876 and as the Administrator of South Australia during the absence of the Governor from late 1872 to mid-1873.

The following hundreds have been proclaimed within the county - Arkaba in 1877, and Adams, French (formerly Basedow), Moralana and Warcowie in 1895.

The Hundred of Arkaba formed part of the land area gazetted on 5 January 1888 as the District Council of Hawker under the District Councils Act 1887. Parts of the hundreds of Adams and Warcowie were added to the District Council on 12 May 1932. All of this land has been part of the Flinders Ranges Council since 1 January 1997.

== Constituent hundreds ==
=== Location of hundreds ===
The hundreds are laid out from west to east from the boundary with the County of Blachford in three columns as follows:

- the western column consisting of Arkaba and Moralana,
- the middle column consisting of Adams and Warcowie,
- the east column consisting of French located immediately east of Warcowie.

The total area of the hundreds accounts for 2,560 square kilometres (988 mi^{2}) out of the county's total area of 3,280 square kilometres (1,265 mi^{2}) or 78.1% of the county's area.

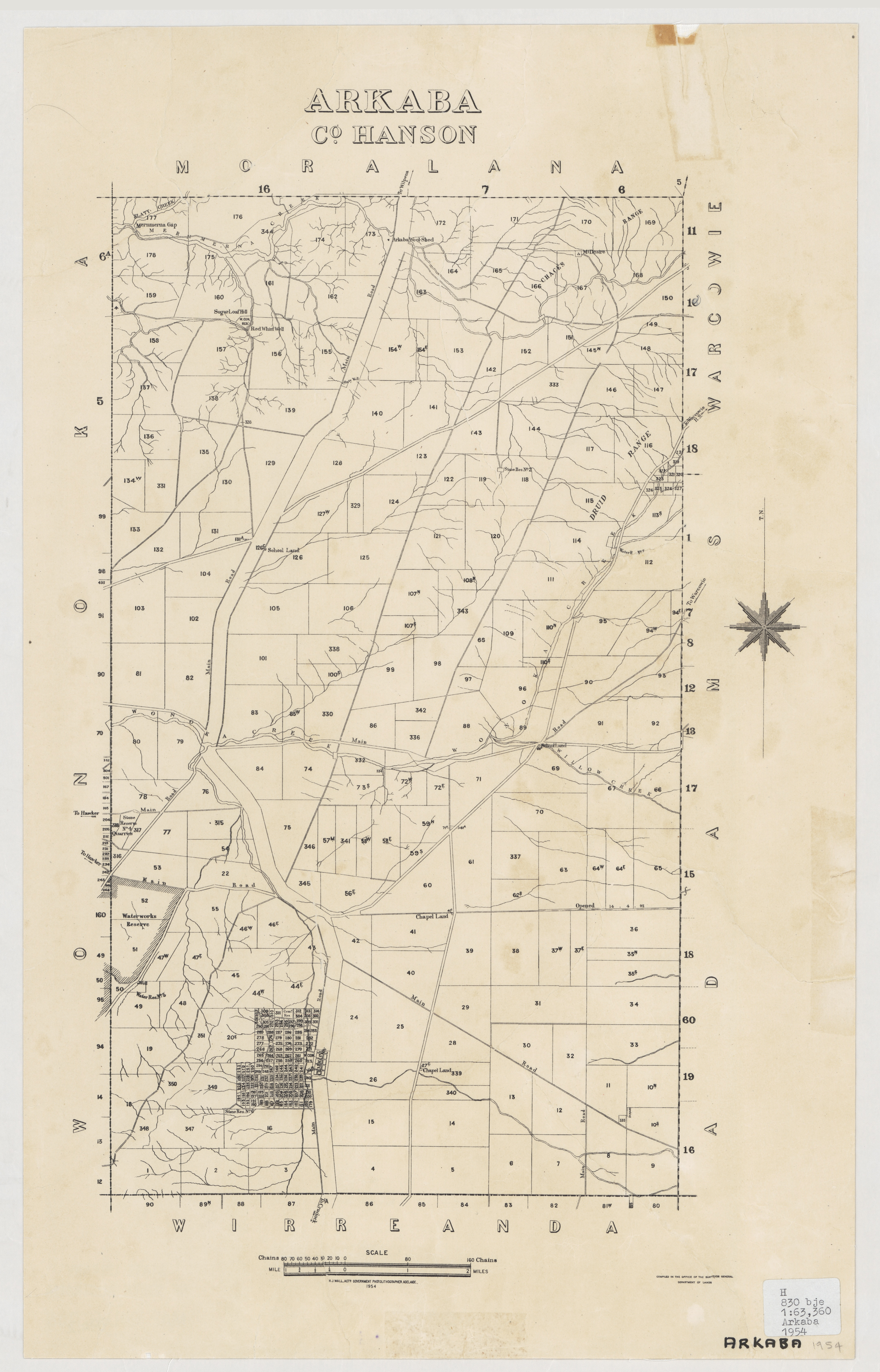
Hundred of Arkaba, 1954

=== Hundred of Adams ===
The Hundred of Adams (31°53′29″S 138°40′25″E) was proclaimed on 12 December 1895. It covers an area of 280 square kilometres (107 mi^{2}) and is named after Henry Adams, a former member of the South Australian Parliament. Its western side is in the locality of Hawker, its eastern side is in Worumba, its north-east corner is in Shaggy Ridge and its south-east corner is shared with the localities of Holowiliena, Holowiliena South and Three Creeks.

=== Hundred of Arkaba ===
The Hundred of Arkaba (31°51′36″S 139°15′55″E) was proclaimed on 18 January 1877. It covers an area of 390 square kilometres (150.5 mi^{2}) and was named after Arkaba Creek. The site of the government town of Chapmanton is located within the hundred. Its extent is fully occupied by part of the locality of Hawker.

=== Hundred of French ===
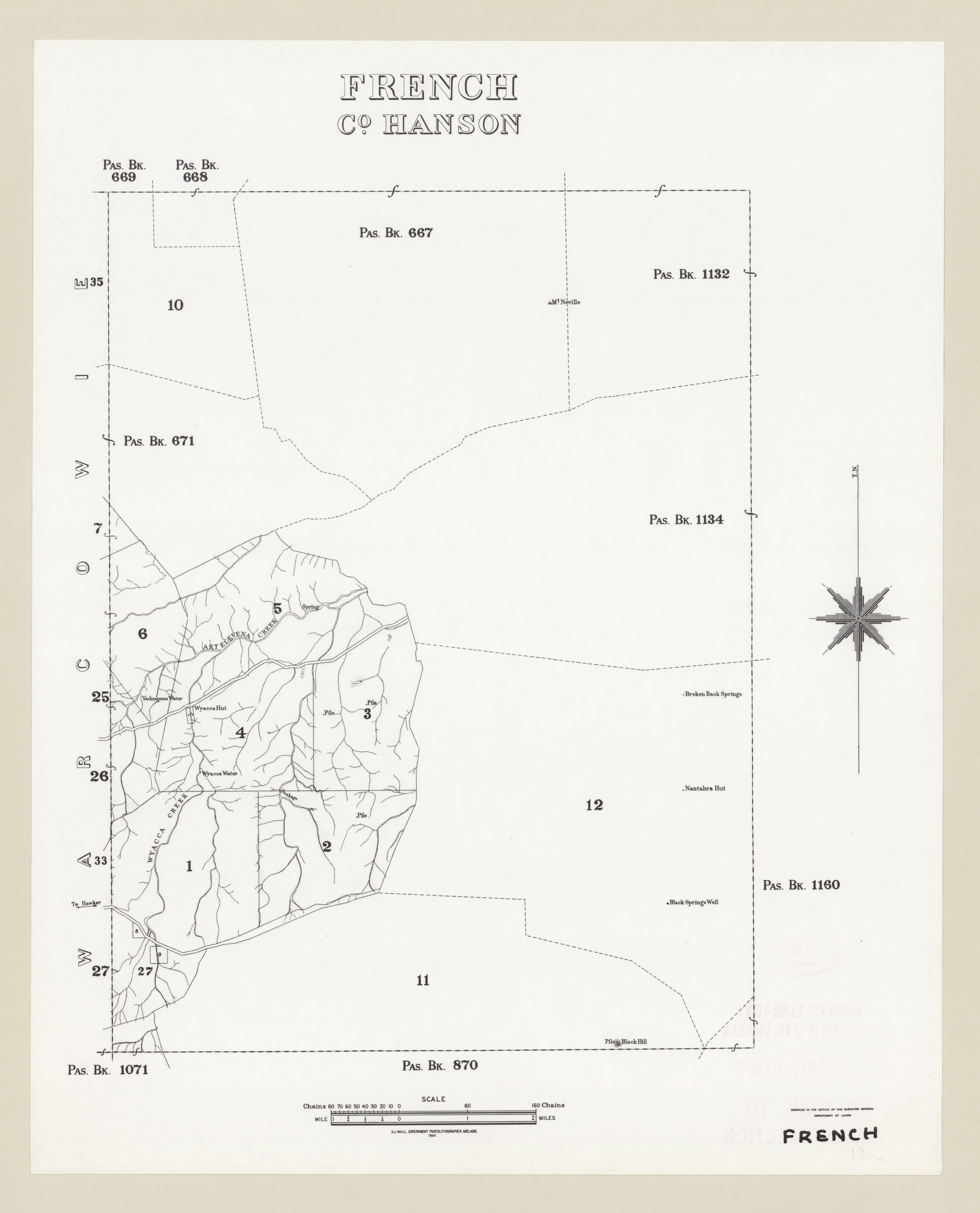
Hundred of French, 1964

The Hundred of French (31°42′50″S 138°50′00″E) was originally proclaimed on 12 December 1895 as the Hundred of Basedow (German: [ˈbaːzəˌdoː]), covers an area of 302 square kilometres (116.5 mi^{2}). The original naming was to honour M. P. F. Basedow, a member of the South Australian Parliament. It was one of places to be renamed during World War I as it was "of enemy origin". The Hundred of Perawillia was first proposed in 1916 as a replacement name but was not accepted. It was finally named after John French, a British general of World War I on 10 January 1918. Its centre is occupied by a portion of the locality of Flinders Ranges in the west and by a portion of Willippa in the east, while its southern end is occupied by Shaggy Ridge in the west and by Black Hill Station in the east, and while its northern end is occupied by Upalinna and Mount Havelock in the west and by Prelinna in the east.

=== Hundred of Moralana ===
The Hundred of Moralana (31°38′34″S 138°31′31″E) was proclaimed on 7 March 1895. It covers an area of 340 square kilometres (130 mi^{2}) and its name is derived from an Aboriginal word whose meaning is not known. Its extent is fully occupied by part of the locality of Flinders Ranges.

=== Hundred of Warcowie ===
The Hundred of Warcowie (31°43′05″S 138°40′33″E) was proclaimed on 7 March 1895. It covers an area of 280 square kilometres (110 mi^{2}) and its name is derived from an Aboriginal word meaning “crows waterhole”. Its centre is occupied by a portion of the locality of Flinders Ranges while its southern end is occupied by Hawker in the west and Shaggy Ridge in the east, and while its northern end is occupied by Upalinna, Prelinna and Mount Havelock (from west to east).

== See also ==
- Lands administrative divisions of South Australia
- Hawker, South Australia#Climate, the nearest weather station
