= County of Derby =

County of Derby may refer to:

- Derbyshire, England, United Kingdom
- County of Derby (South Australia)
- County of Derby, Queensland, Australia
