= Edeowie Station =

Pastoral lease in South Australia

Coordinates: 31.44584°S 138.45327°E

Location in South Australia

Edeowie Station is a pastoral lease that currently operates as a sheep station in South Australia.

It is located approximately 45 kilometres (28 mi) north of Hawker and 48 kilometres (30 mi) south of Blinman in the Flinders Ranges.

The property was established in 1859 by William Marchant who stocked it sheep. The Browne brothers had previously held the land as early as 1851. In the 1860s an eating house to service local travelers was built not far from the homestead. By 1863 the government had sunk a bore nearby and small township was established. Drought struck in 1865 and broke in 1868 but only after the population had been reduced at the small township from 316 to 36. A post office was built in 1870.

In 1920 the then owner, V. H. Mogg, sold the 30,800 acres (12,464 ha) station to Messrs H. L. Nutt and sons of Orroroo for £16,400.

In 1941 the property occupied an area of 50 square miles (129 km^{2}).

== See also ==
- List of ranches and stations
- Edeowie glass
