= Hylaeus littleri =

Scientific classification
- Kingdom: Animalia
- Phylum: Arthropoda
- Clade: Pancrustacea
- Class: Insecta
- Order: Hymenoptera
- Family: Colletidae
- Genus: Hylaeus
- Species: H. littleri

Binomial name
- Hylaeus littleri (Cockerell, 1918)

Synonyms
- Prosopis littleri Cockerell, 1918

Species of bee

Hylaeus littleri, or Hylaeus (Prosopisteron) littleri, also known as Littler's masked bee, is a species of bee in the family Colletidae and subfamily Hylaeinae. It is endemic to Australia. It was described by British-American entomologist Theodore Dru Alison Cockerell in 1918.

== Description ==
Male body length is 5.5 mm. Integumental colouration is mainly black, with yellow and bright ferruginous markings.

== Distribution and habitat ==
The species occurs in south-eastern Australia. The type locality is George Town, Tasmania. It has also been recorded from Mount Magnificent in the Mount Lofty Ranges of South Australia.

== Behaviour ==
The adults are flying mellivores. Flowering plants visited by the bees include Banksia species.
