= Mount Brown Conservation Park =

Protected area in South Australia

- IUCN category VI (protected area with sustainable use of natural resources)
- Location within South Australia
- Location: South Australia
- Nearest city: Quorn
- Coordinates: 32°29′24.4″S 138°1′58.8″E
- Area: 22.64 km^{2} (8.74 sq mi)
- Established: 4 November 1993
- Governing body: Department for Environment and Water
- Website: Official website

Mount Brown Conservation Park is a protected area in the Flinders Ranges of South Australia. The park has established walking trails, including a section of the Heysen Trail. The park is managed by the Department of Environment, Water and Natural Resources; entry is free. It is located 14 km (8.7 mi) south of Quorn and about 300 km (190 mi) north of the nearest airport at Adelaide.

The conservation park is classified as an IUCN Category VI protected area.

== History ==
The conservation park was dedicated in November 1993 and its name was derived from the former forest reserve that occupied part of its extent.

== Prior use of the land ==
Prior to European settlement, the land was solely in the custody of the Nukunu people. Europeans first visited the area on 10 and 11 March 1802 when a group of people from HMS Investigator led by the Scottish botanist, Robert Brown, climbed Mount Brown. From the 1870s, the land was used for forestry with the focus being on nursery activity to produce trees for planting in drier parts of South Australia and other Australian states. After 1900, the nursery role of the forest ceased and the land was leased for pastoral use, a practice which continued until the 1990s. Part of the land was declared as a forest reserve possibly in 1925. In 1990, the forest reserve status was withdrawn as part of a rationalisation of land holdings by the responsible South Australian government agency, the Department of Woods and Forests.

== See also ==
- Protected areas of South Australia

== Citations and references ==
=== References ===
- "Mount Brown Conservation Park Management Plan" (PDF). Department for Environment Heritage and Aboriginal Affairs (DEHAA). 1999.
- "Mount Brown Conservation Park Summit Hike (brochure)" (PDF). Department of Environment and Natural Resources (DENR). 2010.
- "Search result for Mount Brown Conservation Park (record id no SA0046707)". Department of Planning, Transport and Infrastructure (DPTI). 2013. Archived from the original on 12 October 2016.
- "Protected Areas Information System - reserve list (as of 16 July 2015)" (PDF). Department of Environment Water and Natural Resources (DEWNR). 30 June 2015. Archived from the original (PDF) on 24 September 2015.
