= Finniss Conservation Park =

Protected area in South Australia

- IUCN category III (natural monument or feature)
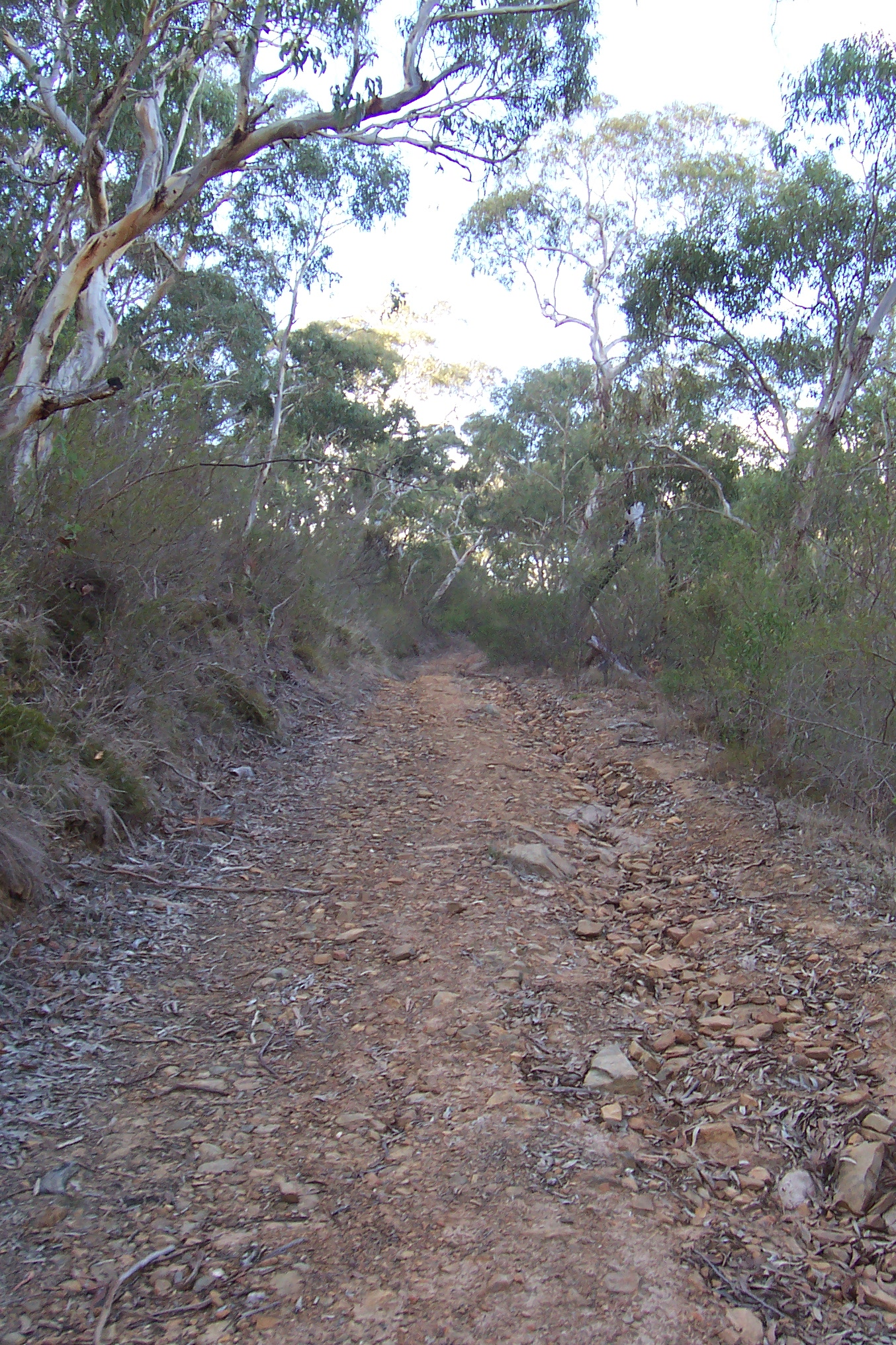
- Finniss in Easter 2007

- Location within South Australia
- Location: South Australia
- Nearest city: Ashbourne
- Coordinates: 35°18′57″S 138°41′42″E
- Area: 1.23 km^{2} (0.47 sq mi)
- Established: 29 January 1976
- Governing body: Department for Environment and Water

Finniss Conservation Park is a protected area in the Australian state of South Australia located in the Mount Lofty Ranges about 43 kilometres (27 miles) south of the state capital of Adelaide and about 7 kilometres (4.3 miles) west of Ashbourne. It is located within the gazetted locality of Mount Magnificent.

The conservation park consists of the following land in the cadastral unit of the Hundred of Kondoparinga - "Allotment 22 of DP 63695" and sections 107, 108 and 1963. It came into existence on 29 January 1976 by proclamation under the National Parks and Wildlife Act 1972 in respect to section 1963. Land in sections 107 and 108 was added on 28 November 1985 and land in Allotment 22 was added on 23 June 2005. As of 2018, it covered an area of 1.23 square kilometres (0.47 sq mi).

The Heysen Trail, the long distance walking trail, passes along the west side of the conservation park from Ridge Road in the south to Mount Magnificent Road in the north.

In 1980, the conservation park was described as follows:

A small park preserving a natural remnant of the open forest and scrub associations representative of the region, including one of the best preserved areas of Eucalyptus cosmophylla scrub in the South Mount Lofty Ranges. The park includes crest, slope and valley floor associations and affords good views of the coast...

A high rocky plateau and south trending ridges with steep intervening valleys, including a short stretch of the Finniss River. The western end of the Park consists of E. leucoxylon/E. fasciculosa woodland over regenerating pasture. The eastern end includes the plateau and is vegetated by very dense, spectacular scrub of E. cosmophylla, Hakea prostrata, Hulcina, Allocasuarina muelleriana, Leptospermum juniperinum and Tetratheca pilosa...

The western end has been semi-cleared and grazed, however the E. Cosmophyla scrub is essentially undisturbed. This scrub area is contiguous with scrub to the east and north-east of the park.

The conservation park is classified as an IUCN Category III protected area. In 1980, it was listed on the now-defunct Register of the National Estate.

== See also ==
- Protected areas of South Australia
- Mount Magnificent Conservation Park
