= William Marchant =

William Marchant may refer to:

- William Marchant (playwright) (1923–1995), American playwright and screenwriter
- William Sydney Marchant (1894–1953), British colonial administrator
- William Marchant (loyalist) (1948–1987), Northern Irish loyalist and volunteer in the Ulster Volunteer Force
- William Lavington Marchant (1828-1888), An Australian Pastoralist
- William Marchant (Rhode Island) (fl. 1800s), a Justice of the Rhode Island Supreme Court from 1808 to 1810
