= Parachilna, South Australia =

Parachilna
- Town
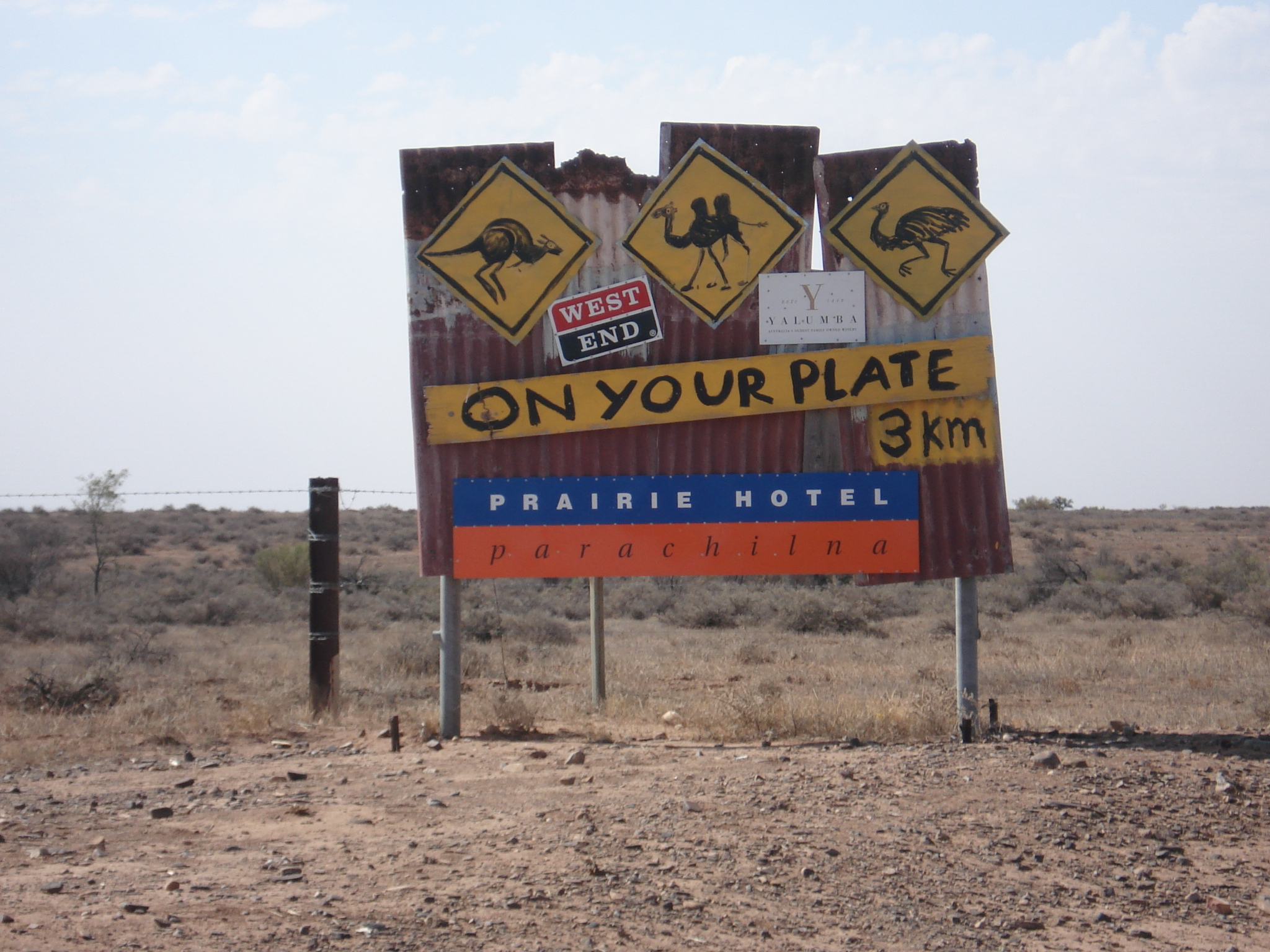
- Selection of meats provided at the hotel

- Coordinates: 31°07′S 138°23′E
- Country: Australia
- State: South Australia
- Region: Far North
- LGA: Pastoral Unincorporated Area
- Location: 422 km (262 mi) N of Adelaide; 30 km (19 mi) W of Blinman; 65 km (40 mi) S of Leigh Creek
- Established: 1889

Government
  - State electorates: Giles; Stuart
  - Federal division: Grey

Population
  - Total: 0 (SAL 2021)
- Time zone: UTC+9:30 (ACST)
  - Summer (DST): UTC+10:30 (ACDT)
- Postcode: 5730
- County: Taunton
- Mean max temp: 26.4 °C (79.5 °F)
- Mean min temp: 12.8 °C (55.0 °F)
- Annual rainfall: 223.9 mm (8.81 in)
Localities around Parachilna
Motpena	Motpena	Motpena
Motpena	Parachilna	Motpena
Motpena	Motpena	Mount Falkland
- Locations; Adjoining localities

Parachilna (/ˌpærəˈtʃɪlnə/ PARR-ə-CHIL-nə) is a country town in South Australia. The town was first surveyed in 1863 due to its closeness to a government water well. It is on the railway line and road between Port Augusta and Leigh Creek. Today, the Prairie Hotel, railway station, airstrip and a few buildings remain. The road east into the Flinders Ranges leads through Parachilna Gorge to Blinman. The town is surrounded by Motpena station pastoral lease.

The town's name is from the Aboriginal patajilnda, meaning "place of peppermint gum trees". The spelling difference is due to an early translation misreading. The railway station was completed in 1881 as part of the line to Leigh Creek through Beltana. The area was one of the set locations for the Australian feature film, Rabbit Proof Fence.

The Prairie Hotel is the only substantial building in the town, dating from the days when the rail was supreme. Away from the highway, the hotel fronts the railway line and the now derelict station building. The sandstone and limestone building has been in part retained, in part restored and extended. There are now no passengers on the line that once ran from Adelaide to Marree and connected with the old Ghan line to Oodnadatta and Alice Springs. The hotel's patrons come by car or bus. Local Aboriginal artwork decorates the lounges and dining room and there are displays of the nearby Ediacaran fossils.

The hotel serves feral animals like camel, goat and pig, as well as kangaroo and emu.

The historic Parachilna Fettlers' Cottages Ruins are listed on the South Australian Heritage Register.

Parachilna is located within the federal Division of Grey, the state electoral districts of Giles and Stuart, the Pastoral Unincorporated Area of South Australia and the state's Far North region. In the absence of a local government authority, the community in Parachilna receives municipal services from a state government agency, the Outback Communities Authority.

The town gives its name to a 2013 album by Andy Irvine.

== See also ==
- Edeowie glass
- Adnoartina, a spirit associated with ochre deposits near Parachilna
