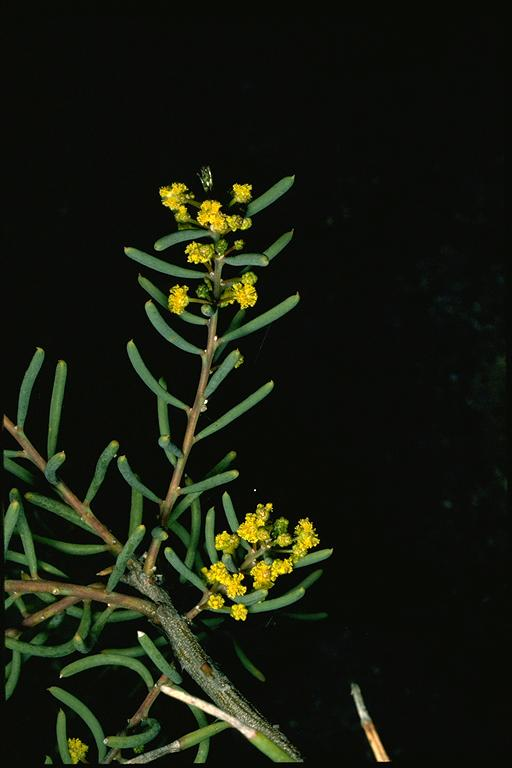
- In the Australian National Botanic Gardens

Conservation status
- Endangered (EPBC Act)

Scientific classification
- Kingdom: Plantae
- Clade: Embryophytes
- Clade: Tracheophytes
- Clade: Spermatophytes
- Clade: Angiosperms
- Clade: Eudicots
- Clade: Rosids
- Order: Fabales
- Family: Fabaceae
- Subfamily: Caesalpinioideae
- Clade: Mimosoid clade
- Genus: Acacia
- Species: A. pinguifolia

Binomial name
- Acacia pinguifolia J.M.Black
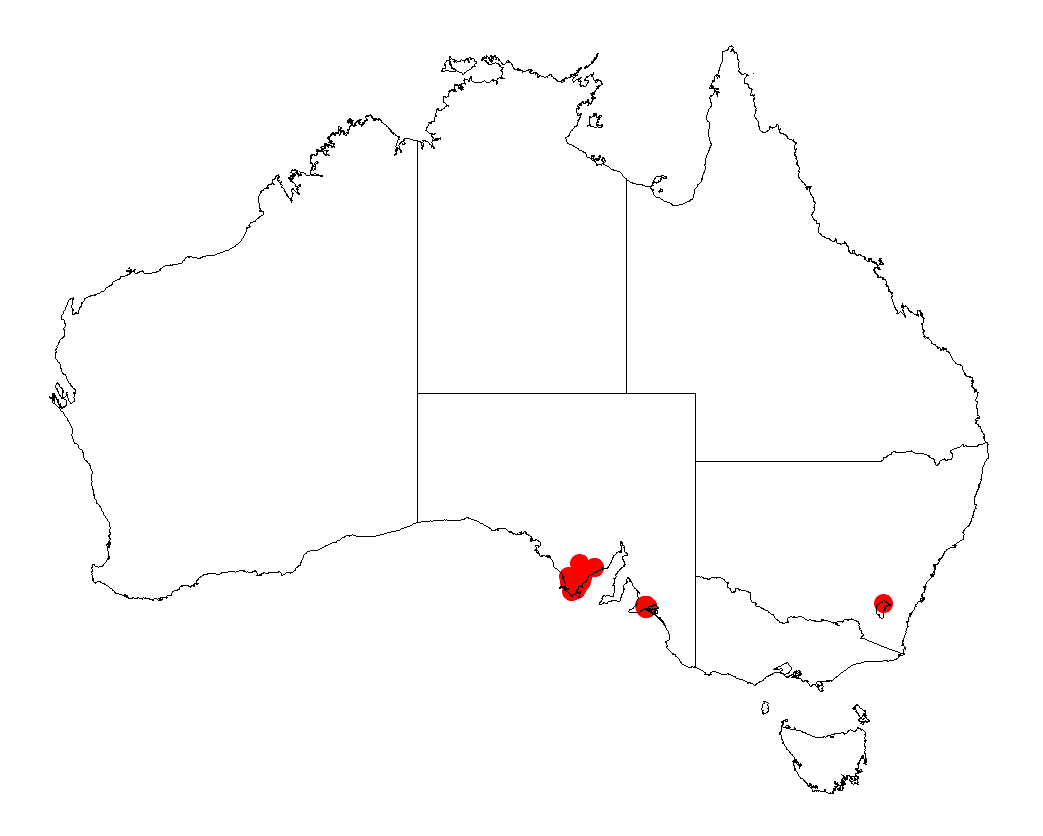
- Occurrence data from AVH

Synonyms
- Racosperma pinguifolium (J.M.Black) Pedley

= Acacia pinguifolia =

Species of legume

Acacia pinguifolia, commonly known as the fat-leaved wattle or fat-leaf wattle, is endemic to South Australia, and is listed as an endangered species. It is in the Plurinerves section of the Acacias.

== Distribution and habitat ==
It is found on the southern Eyre Peninsula and has a disjunct population near Finniss in the south Lofty region. It mainly grows in sandy or hard alkaline soils, in open scrub or woodland.

== History ==
The species was first described in 1947 by the botanist John McConnell Black, from a specimen collected on the Finniss River near Lake Alexandrina, in South Australia. The species epithet, pinguifolia, derives from the Latin adjective, pinguis ("fat") and the compounding root, -folius ("-leaved") to give a Botanical Latin adjective which describes the plant as being "fat-leaved".

== See also ==
- List of Acacia species
