= Moolawatana Station =

Pastoral lease in South Australia

- Town
- Coordinates: 29.90643°S 139.73499°E
- Country: Australia
- State: South Australia
- LGA(s): None
- Location: 139 km (86 mi) east of Lyndhurst, South Australia; 227 km (141 mi) west of Tibooburra, New South Wales

Government
  - State electorate(s): Stuart
  - Federal division(s): Grey

Area
  - Total: 1,900 km^{2} (730 sq mi)
- Postcode: 5732
Localities around Moolawatana Station
	Murnpeowie	Lindon
Mount Freeling	Moolawatana Station
Arkaroola	Wooltana	Frome Downs

Moolawatana Station, mostly referred to as Moolawatana, is a pastoral lease operating as a cattle station in South Australia.

The property is situated approximately 139 kilometres (86 mi) east of Lyndhurst, South Australia and 227 kilometres (141 mi) west of Tibooburra, New South Wales.

The property occupies an area of 1,900 square kilometres (734 sq mi) and is known as the Skeleton Block after all of the area it has shed over time. Moolawatana stretches from east to west, unusual in South Australia, as its northern boundary abuts the dog-proof fence. It straddles the north eastern tip of the Flinders Ranges and its outwash plains. The ephemeral Hamilton Creek runs through the property.

== History ==
The property was originally taken up by William Warwick in 1853 along with Holowiliena Station.

A fire at the station in 1896 destroyed between 120 and 130 bales of wool and the wagons it was being carted on, the cause of the fire was not known.

Heavy rains caused flooding along Hamilton Creek in 1903, 3 inches (76 mm) of rain feel at nearby Mount Freeling over the course of a few days.

Moolawatana was passed in at auction for £13,500 in 1935. The property was owned at the time by Neil McGilp and sons, who had acquired the leasehold in 1880. It was sold later the same year to Messrs A.J. and P.A. McBride of the Wilgena Pastoral Company for £15,000 along with the 6,700 sheep and 20 horses that the property was stocked with. The 448 square miles (1,160 km^{2}) station adjoined Wooltana Station.

The McBrides sold the property in 1947 to the Leslie Brothers of Mount Fitton Station, which adjoins Moolawatana to the west. The Leslies paid £22,500 to acquire Moolawatana.

In 1963 the property encompassed not only the Moolawatana but also the Mount Freeling, Mount Fitton and Yudnamutana leaseholds with a total area of approximately 2,200 square kilometres (849 sq mi). The run was divided again with the Mount Freeling lease being sold off leaving approximately 1,200 square kilometres (463 sq mi) at Moolawatana. In 1982 the Woolatchi lease was acquired adding about 700 square kilometres (270 sq mi).

The property switched from sheep to cattle in 1993 as a result of dog attacks on sheep; earlier the same year over 900 dogs had been shot, 98 of them inside the fence.

Moolawatana had good rains in 1997 causing the creek to run; a long dry spell followed with much of the surrounding area being drought struck. In 2001 the property experienced heavy thunderstorms followed by a locust outbreak with one swarm taking two hours to fly past the homestead. More good rains fell in 2008.

The land occupying the extent of the Moolawatana Station pastoral lease was gazetted as a locality by the Government of South Australia on 26 April 2013 under the name Moolawatana.

== Proposed wind and solar hub ==
In November 2021, Kallis Energy Investments announced a proposal to build a wind and solar farm near Moolawatana Station. The Moolawatana Renewable Hydrogen Project would use the electricity to produce green hydrogen and export it through a pipeline to Port Bonython on Spencer Gulf.

== See also ==
- List of ranches and stations
