= Mount Brown (South Australia) =

Mountain in South Australia

- Location within South Australia

Highest point
- Elevation: 964 m (3,163 ft)
- Coordinates: 32°30′22.53″S 138°0′28.44″E

Geography
- Location: South Australia, Australia
- Parent range: Flinders Ranges

Mount Brown is a mountain in the Australian state of South Australia located in the Flinders Ranges about 20 kilometres (12 mi) east of Port Augusta.

The mountain was named by the British navigator Matthew Flinders on 9 March 1802 after the Scottish botanist, Robert Brown, who was a member of HMS Investigator’s scientific team. Brown along with others from HMS Investigator including Ferdinand Bauer and William Westall climbed the mountain on 10 and 11 March 1802.

The mountain has a height of 964 m (3,163 ft).

Since 1993, it has been located within the boundaries of the protected area known as the Mount Brown Conservation Park.

The mountain’s summit can be reached via a walking trail known as the Mount Brown Summit Hike which starts near the entrance of the conservation park to the north of the summit, which is graded by the conservation park’s managing authority as being a “moderate hike’ and consists of a loop which allows two choices of route - one being a distance of 11.6 km (7.2 mi) with a return time of 6 hours and other being a distance of 15 km (9.3 mi) with a return time of 7.5 hours. The western side of the loop is part of the long distance walking trail, the Heysen Trail, which continues throughout the conservation park from the south to its trailhead at Parachilna Gorge.

== See also ==
- List of mountains in Australia

== Citations and references ==
=== References ===
- "Mount Brown Conservation Park Management Plan" (PDF). Department for Environment Heritage and Aboriginal Affairs (DEHAA). 1999.
- "Mount Brown Conservation Park Summit Hike (brochure)" (PDF). Department of Environment and Natural Resources (DENR). 2010.
- "Search result for Mount Brown (record id no SA0010029)". Department of Planning, Transport and Infrastructure (DPTI). 2013. Archived from the original on 12 October 2016.
