= County of Taunton =

Taunton
- Cadastral division
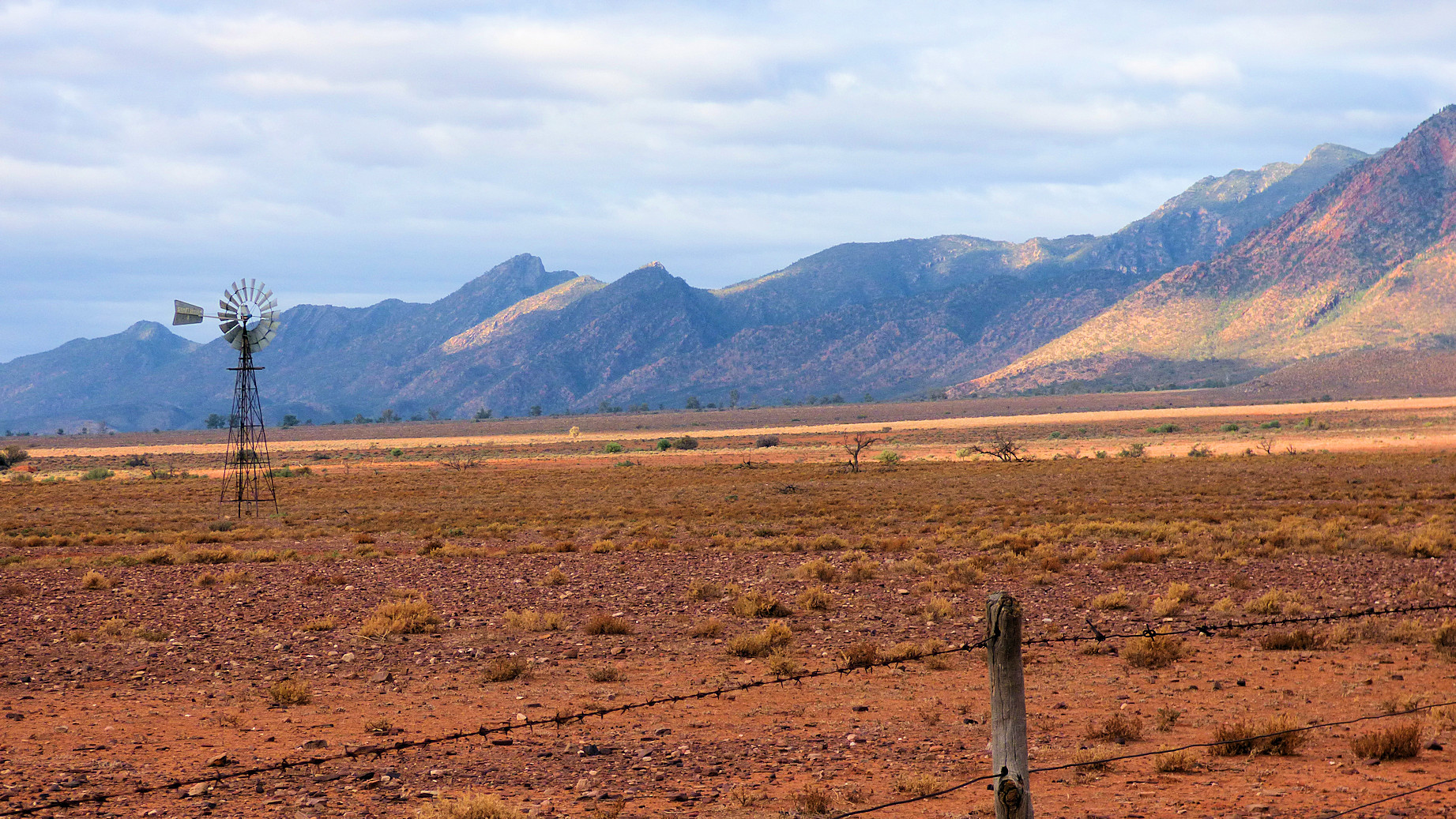
- Razorback Lookout, Ikara-Flinders Ranges National Park

- Coordinates: 31°13′58″S 138°34′35″E
- Country: Australia
- State: South Australia
- Region: Far North
- LGA(s): Pastoral Unincorporated Area
- Location: 160 km (99 mi) NE of Port Augusta
- Established: 18 January 1877

Area
  - Total: 5,560 km^{2} (2,147 sq mi)
Lands administrative divisions around Taunton
Lake Torrens	-	-
Lake Torrens	Taunton	-
Lake Torrens	Blachford; Hanson	Derby
- Location; Adjoining counties

County of Taunton is a cadastral unit located in the Australian state of South Australia on land on the east coast of Lake Torrens about 160 kilometres (99 mi) from the city of Port Augusta. It was proclaimed in 1877 and named after Lord Taunton who was the Secretary for the Colonies from 1855 to 1858. It has been partially divided in the following sub-units of hundreds – Bunyeroo, Carr, Edeowie, Nilpena, Oratunga and Parachilna.

== Description ==
The County of Taunton covers the part of South Australia extending from the east coast of Lake Torrens for about 100 kilometres (62 mi) and extending a distance of 60 kilometres (37 mi) north of its boundary in the south with the counties of Blachford, Hanson and Derby from west to east. It is the most northerly county in South Australia.

The county has a physical landscape consisting of a portion of the Flinders Ranges in its east and the floodplains draining from the ranges to Lake Torrens in its west.

The principal towns in the county are Blinman and Parachilna.

The county is served by one principal road, The Outback Highway, which passes through the county in a north-south direction from Hawker in the south through the hundreds of Edeowie, Bunyeroo, Nipena and Parachilna to Leigh Creek in the north via Parachilna.

The Marree railway line passes through the county in a north-south direction generally in parallel with The Outback Highway.

Statutory land use within the county is limited to four main zones. Firstly, land between Lake Torrens and The Outback Highway which is zoned as ‘pastoral’ is intended to be predominantly used for “the grazing of livestock” while ensuring that these activities do not affect the “preservation of the natural environment and character of the zone.” Land which is located east of The Outback Highway and in the main body of the Flinders Ranges is placed in two zones – ‘environment class A’ and ‘environmental class B’ where built development, agriculture and mining are more highly controlled or even prohibited in some situations to conserve and protect “the natural character and environment of the area.” Fourthly, land in the east of the county and in parts of its north that are outside of the alignment of the ranges is zoned ‘pastoral landscape’ to control development, agriculture and mining to preserve “the environmental and scenic qualities of the foreground of the most prominent ranges.”

The county includes the following protected areas within its extent – the northern end of the Ikara-Flinders Ranges National Park and the Bunkers Conservation Reserve.

The county is located within the Pastoral Unincorporated Area of the state where municipal services are provided by the Government of South Australia via agencies such as the Outback Communities Authority (OCA). Within the county, the OCA provides services to communities living in Blinman and Parachilna.

== History ==
The County of Taunton was proclaimed on 18 January 1877. It was named after Lord Taunton who was the Secretary for the Colonies from 1855 to 1858.

The following hundreds have been proclaimed within the county - Carr in 1877, Bunyeroo, Edeowie, Nilpena and Parachilna in 1881, and Oratunga in 1895.

== Constituent hundreds ==
=== Location of constituent hundreds ===
The hundreds are laid out from west to east in three columns as follows:

- Nilpena, Parachilna, Bunyeroo and Edeowie (from north to south)
- Oratunga and,
- Carr.

The total area of the hundreds accounts for 1,610 square kilometres (622 sq mi) out of the county’s total area of 5,560 square kilometres (2,147 sq mi) or 29% of the county's area.

=== Hundred of Bunyeroo ===
The Hundred of Bunyeroo (31°20′45″S 138°25′12″E) was proclaimed on 1 December 1881. It covers an area of 310 square kilometres (120 sq mi) and its name was derived from the botanical name for “a rank variety of saltbush” which may be of Aboriginal origin which had been used previously for a nearby hill and for a nearby pastoral property. It is entirely located within the boundaries of the locality of Flinders Ranges.

=== Hundred of Carr ===
The Hundred of Carr (31°09′09″S 138°42′32″E) was proclaimed on 3 May 1877. It covers an area of 220 square kilometres (85 sq mi) and was named after John Carr, a member of the South Australian Parliament from 1868 to 1884. Its northern end is within the locality of Blinman, its southern end is in Gum Creek Station and part of its east side in Angorigina.

=== Hundred of Edeowie ===
The Hundred of Edeowie (31°26′53″S 138°24′18″E) was proclaimed on 1 December 1881. It covers an area of 260 square kilometres (102 sq mi). Its name was derived from the Edeowie Homestead and ultimately from “an Aboriginal word meaning diamond sparrow water, from "ethie" meaning diamond sparrow and "owie" meaning water.” It is located entirely within the locality of Flinders Ranges.

=== Hundred of Nilpena ===
The Hundred of Nilpena (31°06′26″S 138°23′51″E) was proclaimed on 1 December 1881. It covers an area of 280 square kilometres (109 sq mi). Its name was derived from the Nilpena Homestead and ultimately from a “native name applied to W J Brown's sheep station” whose meaning is not known. Its western side is in the locality of Motpena while its eastern side contains parts of Alpana, Moolooloo and Mount Falkland, while its centre includes the entirety of Parachilna.

=== Hundred of Oratunga ===
The Hundred of Oratunga (31°07′57″S 138°34′59″E) was proclaimed on 7 March 1895. It covers an area of 210 square kilometres (82 sq mi) and its name was derived from an aboriginal word which means ‘tea tree creek’. Its centre is within the locality of Alpana while part of its north side is in Oratunga Station, part of its west side is in Mount Falkland and part of its south side is in Gum Creek Station.

=== Hundred of Parachilna ===
The Hundred of Parachilna (31°13′48″S 138°25′03″E) was proclaimed on 1 December 1881. It covers an area of 350 square kilometres (134 sq mi) and it was derived from an Aboriginal word meaning “a creek with steep banks and stones and ochre in the bed.” Its southern end is within the locality of Flinders Ranges while its north-western corner is in the locality of Motpena and its north-eastern corner in Mount Falkland.

== See also ==
- Lands administrative divisions of South Australia
- Taunton (disambiguation)
