= Taunton (disambiguation) =

Taunton is the county town of Somerset, England.

Taunton may also refer to:

== Places ==
=== Australia ===
- Taunton, Queensland, a locality
- Taunton National Park, a scientific national park in Queensland
- County of Taunton, a cadastral division in South Australia
- Taunton, South Australia, a locality

=== United Kingdom ===
- Taunton (UK Parliament constituency), a former parliamentary constituency in Somerset
- Taunton Deane, a former local government district with borough status in Somerset
- Taunton Stop Line, a World War II defensive line in south west England
- Taunton Racecourse, located near the town from which it takes its name
- Taunton, Greater Manchester, a suburb of Ashton-under-Lyne

=== United States ===
- Taunton, Massachusetts
- Taunton, Minnesota
- Taunton, New York
- Taunton, Washington
- Taunton River, historically called the Taunton Great River, a river in southern Massachusetts

== People ==
- Taunton (surname)
- Baron Taunton, defunct British peerage title

== Other ==
- Taunton train fire, a fire in an English sleeping car train on 6 July 1978
- Taunton Period, a British Bronze Age metalworking period, see Penard Period
- Taunton Press
- The Siege of Taunton, during the English Civil War
- Taunton's Grammar School Southampton, see Highfield, Hampshire

== See also ==
- Tauntaun, a fictional creature in the Star Wars universe
- Saunton, a village in north Devon, England
- Tawstock, a village in north Devon, England
