= County of Lytton (South Australia) =

Lytton
- Cadastral division
- Coordinates: 32.16°S 139.49°E
- Country: Australia
- State: South Australia
- Region: Far North
- LGA(s): Pastoral unincorporated area
- Established: 18 January 1877

Area
  - Total: 3,580 km^{2} (1,381 sq mi)
Lands administrative divisions around Lytton
| Hanson | Derby |
| Granville | Lytton |
| Dalhousie | Herbert |

The County of Lytton is one of the 49 counties of South Australia. It was proclaimed 1877 by Governor Anthony Musgrave and named for the Robert Bulwer-Lytton, Earl of Lytton, who was the Viceroy of India at the time. It covers a rectangular portion of unincorporated pastoral land in the state's Far North region. The west of the county includes some of the eastern foothills of the Flinders Ranges and the county's southern border is about 19 kilometres (12 mi) north of Yunta. The County of Lytton has never been divided into hundreds.
