= Parachilna Gorge =

Gorge in South Australia

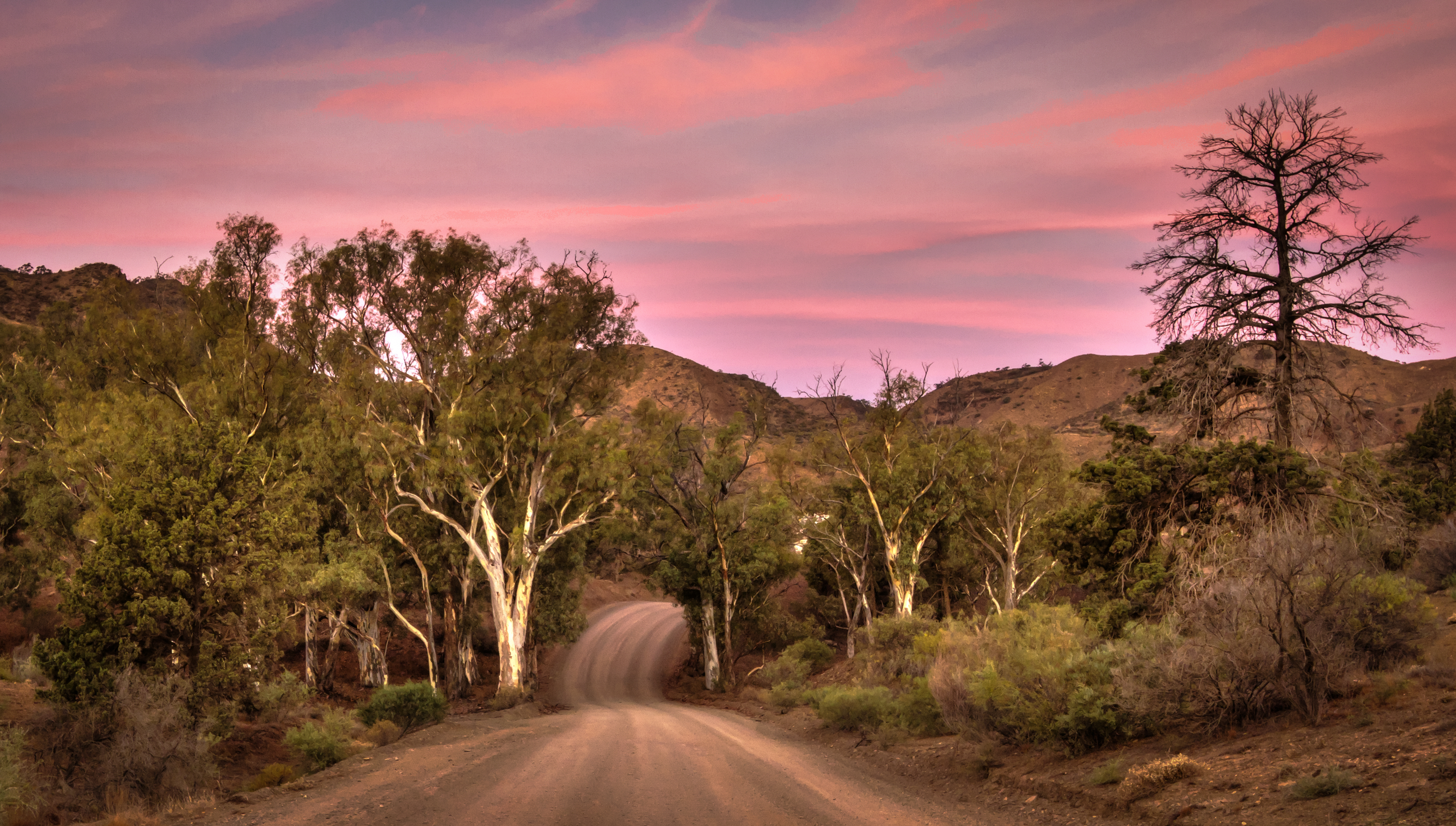
- Sunset in Parachilna Gorge

- Location within South Australia

Geography
- Country: Australia
- State: South Australia
- Region: Far North
- District: Mount Falkland, Alpana
- Coordinates: 31°07′50″S 138°30′50″E
- Traversed by: Parachilna Gorge Road
- River: Parachilna Creek
- Interactive map of Parachilna Gorge

The Parachilna Gorge is a gorge on the western side of the Flinders Ranges in South Australia. It is located about 8 kilometres (5.0 miles) east of the town of Parachilna. Parachilna Creek flows through the gorge. Parachilna Gorge Road runs from Parachilna on the plains up through the gorge to Blinman. Angorichina Village is near the road at the eastern end of the gorge.

Parachilna Gorge is the northern trailhead of the Heysen Trail, a walking trail which extends for about 1,200 kilometres (750 miles) to the southern trailhead at the tip of Fleurieu Peninsula.
