= Holowiliena Station =

Pastoral lease in South Australia

Coordinates: 31.8771°S 138.8366°E

Location in South Australia

Holowiliena or Holowiliena Station is a pastoral lease located about 40 kilometres (25 mi) east of Hawker and 88 kilometres (55 mi) south of Blinman in the state of South Australia.

The sheep station was founded in 1853 by William Warwick and his wife Jennet. The couple were natives of Canonbie in Southwest Scotland and had arrived in South Australia in 1839 aboard the barque Fairfield. William Warwick was employed by the pastoralist brothers William Browne and J. Harris Browne, firstly at Williamstown and then from 1846 as the pioneering manager of their Canowie Station.

In 1853, following a scouting expedition, William Warwick left that position to pioneer Holowiliena Station, being succeeded at Canowie by Harry Price. The young Warwick family loaded their possessions on a bullock dray for the cross-country trek.

When they arrived at Holowiliena the family selected a suitable site and began construction of a stone homestead, soon followed by other outbuildings. Within two years they had established a school for their children and those of their employees. The couple raised 12 children on the property.

The original lease was for 63 square miles (163 km^{2}) but Warwick had soon expanded to an area of 178 square miles (461 km^{2}) by 1857.

The area had excellent rains in 1889, with all the creeks flowing and good feed everywhere for stock. It was regarded as the best season since 1851.

Five generations of the Warwick family have operated the station. In 2015 the renovation of the historic homestead featured in an Australian Broadcasting Corporation documentary series "Restoration Australia".

The land occupying the extent of the Holowiliena pastoral lease was gazetted by the Government of South Australia as a locality in April 2013 under the name "Holowiliena".

== See also ==
- List of ranches and stations
