= Angorichina =

Pastoral lease in South Australia

Coordinates: 31°5′16.5″S 138°44′26.7″E

Location in South Australia

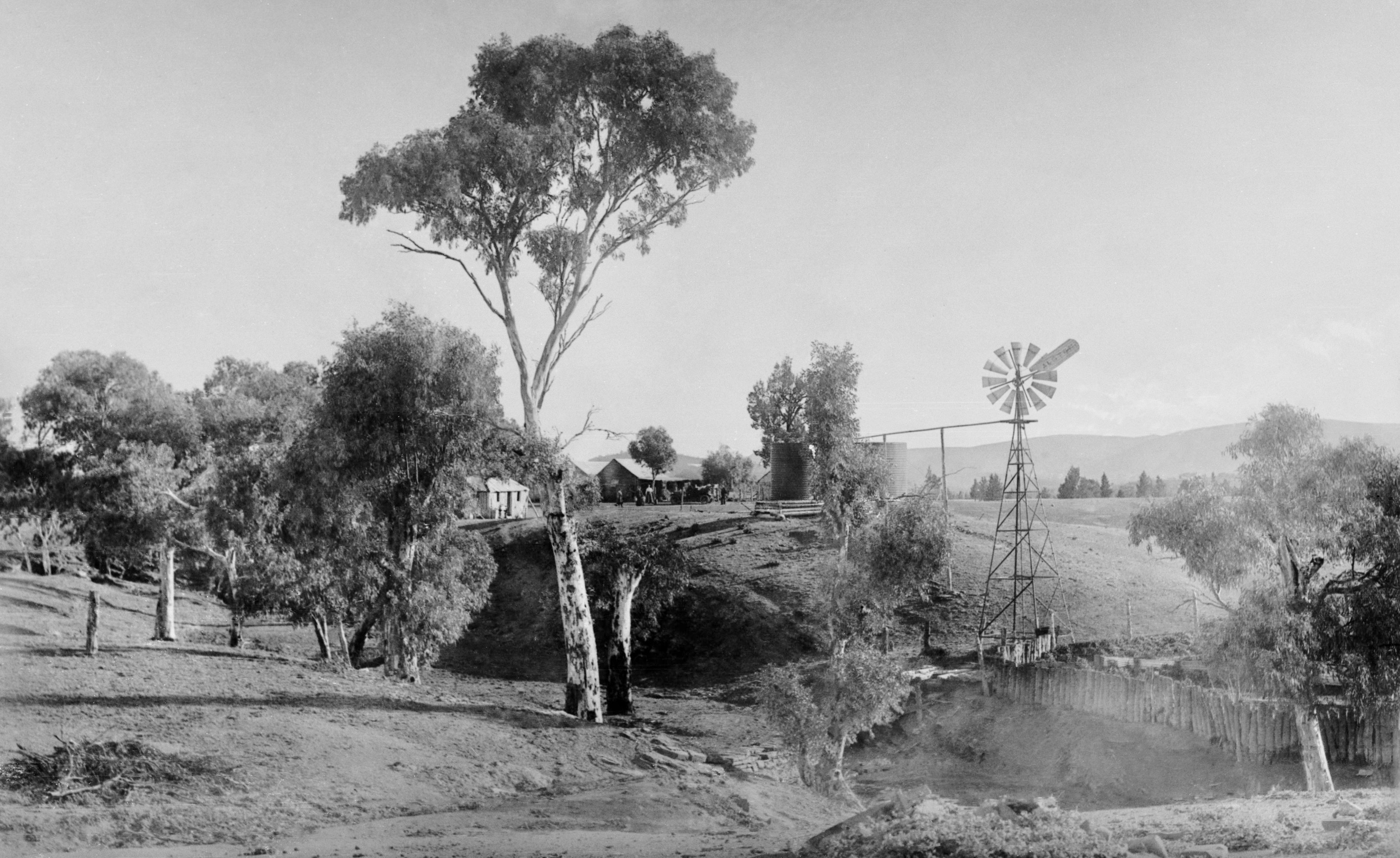
Angorichina Head Station, c. 1925

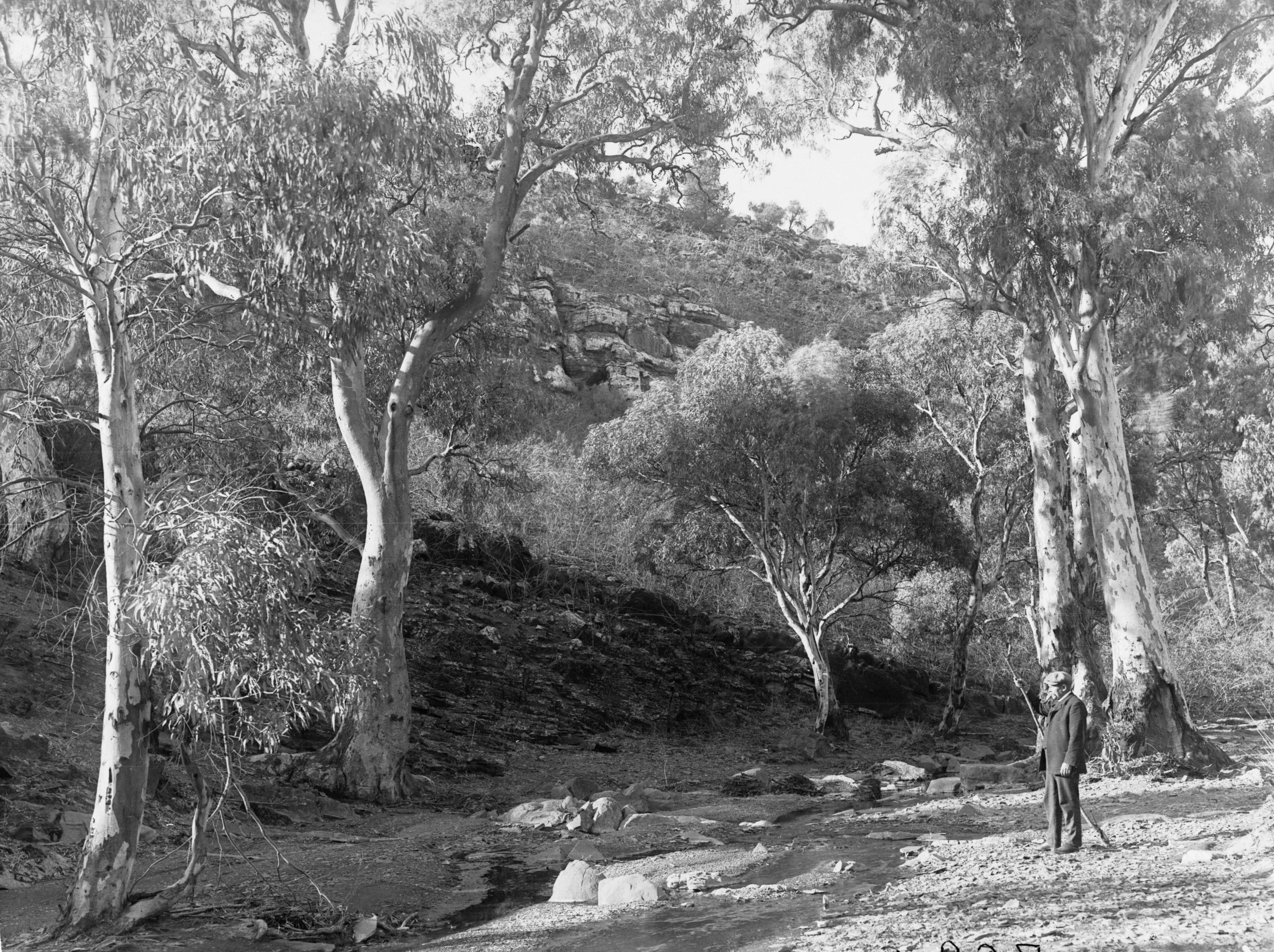
Angorichina Creek, c. 1935

Angorichina is a pastoral lease, 640 square kilometres (247 sq mi) in area, in the Flinders Ranges in the Australian state of South Australia. Its three small permanently inhabited places, dispersed on an east-west axis 18 kilometres (11 miles) long, are Angorichina Station, Blinman, and Angorichina Village.

== Angorichina Station ==
=== History ===
The lease was first taken up by Septimus Boord in 1853. In 1859, the property was visited by the surveyors Selwyn and Goyder and by the Governor of South Australia, Richard MacDonnell. Later the same year a shepherd on Angorichina Station, Robert Blinman, first discovered copper and took out a mining lease, which later became the Blinman mine.

Walter Henry McFarlane acquired Angorichina in the early 1920s after disposing of Warrioota Station. In 1941 the 1200-square-mile (3108 km^{2}) property was carrying a flock of 38,000 sheep that produced 1300 bales of wool.

As of August 2025, the property had been in the Fargher family for four generations.

=== Today ===
As of 2025, the owners are Di and Ian Fargher (the fifth generation of Farghers), and Angorichina Station is still a working sheep station. The renovated 1860s-era homestead, 6 kilometres (4 miles) east of Blinman, together with the garden cottage, accommodates up to eight guests, with only a single group hosted for each stay.

The property is located around 10 km (6.2 mi) east of Blinman, and extends over around 150,000 acres (61,000 ha).

== Populated places ==
=== Blinman ===
Blinman, the small township within the pastoral lease had a population, in 2021, of 43.

=== Angorichina Village ===
Angorichina Village is a small tourist village, 12 kilometres (7.5 miles) west of the Angorichina Station homestead, which provides accommodation, a caravan park and some services.

The site was originally established in 1927 as Angorichina Hostel by the Tubercular Soldiers Association as a sanatorium for returned servicemen of World War I.

== Paleontological importance ==
There are important complex fossil reefs on the property, recording the emergence of small fauna, such as molluscs, arthropods, brachiopods, and tommotiids. There are also fossils of archaeocyaths and calcimicrobes, and one of the sites records the extinction of the archaeocyathids resulting from environmental changes in the early Cambrian.

The oldest known corallimorpharia have been observed in Balcoracanna Gorge, and the first and only known articulated tommotiid specimens of Eccentrotheca helenia and Paterimitra pyramidalis were identified in the exposed strata of the Bunkers Range. This range also hosts diverse species of brachiopods, palaeoscolecid worms, bradoriid arthropods, and molluscs, along with an important silicified trilobite assemblage representative of the "Pararaia bunyerooensis Zone".

The fossils are managed under the Pastoral Land Management and Conservation Act 1989, and it is intended to create a formal conservation agreement with the Angorichina Station.

=== World Heritage bid ===
The Angorichina fossils are one of a group of seven geographically separate areas that are part of the Flinders Ranges geological successions where abundant and diverse arrays of fossils show how animal life began on Earth over a period of 350 million years. These areas were submitted to the UNESCO World Heritage Centre for consideration as a World Heritage Site under criterion (viii) on 15 April 2021, and as of August 2025 remain on the tentative list. The nomination will be voted on in 2026.

== In popular culture ==
A 2011 debut novel by Marion Grace Woolley is titled Angorichina. It tells the story of the tuberculosis hospice in the early 1930s through the eyes of four characters.

== See also ==
- List of ranches and stations
