= County of Derby (South Australia) =

Derby South Australia
- Coordinates: 31.74°S 139.49°E
- Established: 1877
- Area: 3,844 km^{2} (1,484.2 sq mi)
- LGA(s): Pastoral Unincorporated Area
- Region: Far North
Lands administrative divisions around Derby:
| Taunton |
| Hanson | Derby |
| Granville | Lytton |

The County of Derby is one of the 49 counties of South Australia. It was proclaimed 1877 by Governor Anthony Musgrave. It covers a rectangular portion of unincorporated pastoral land in the state's Far North. The west of the county includes some of the eastern foothills of the Flinders Ranges and the county's northern border is about 55 kilometres (34 mi) south of Lake Frome. As of 2014, the county has not been divided into hundreds.

== See also ==
- Lands administrative divisions of South Australia
