= William Lavington Marchant =

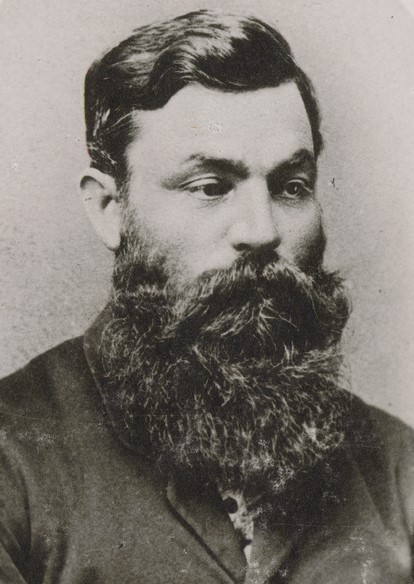

William Lavington Marchant (30 May 1828 – 1889) was a pastoralist and businessman in South Australia.

Marchant was born in Freashford in Somerset in 1828 and arrived in Australia aboard the Fairlie in 1840. He arrived with his father, William L. Marchant Snr, who died shortly after arriving, his mother and five brothers.

His brother, Thomas Balne Marchant, established the Mannanarie run initially as a cattle station but eventually changed to become a sheep station in the 1840s. After the death of Thomas in 1852 and a new lease was issued to William in 1854.

Marchant introduced Durham cattle and Clydesdale horses to South Australia and was involved in many stations in the north of South Australia including Mannanarie, Edeowie, Aroona and Burnside Station. He eventually retired to Adelaide and returned to England, where he died.

Coat of arms of William Lavington Marchant
Crest Upon a mount Vert a Gryphon segreant Sable winged Or between the claws a star as in the Arms. [of eight points Or] Escutcheon Or on a bend engrailed between two gryphons segreant Sable three stars of eight points of the field. Motto TOUJOURS LA MEME
