= Merna Mora =

Pastoral lease in South Australia

Coordinates: 31°32′43″S 138°23′27″E

Location in South Australia

Merna Mora Station is a pastoral lease that currently operates as a sheep station, cattle station, and tourism venture in the Flinders Ranges of South Australia.

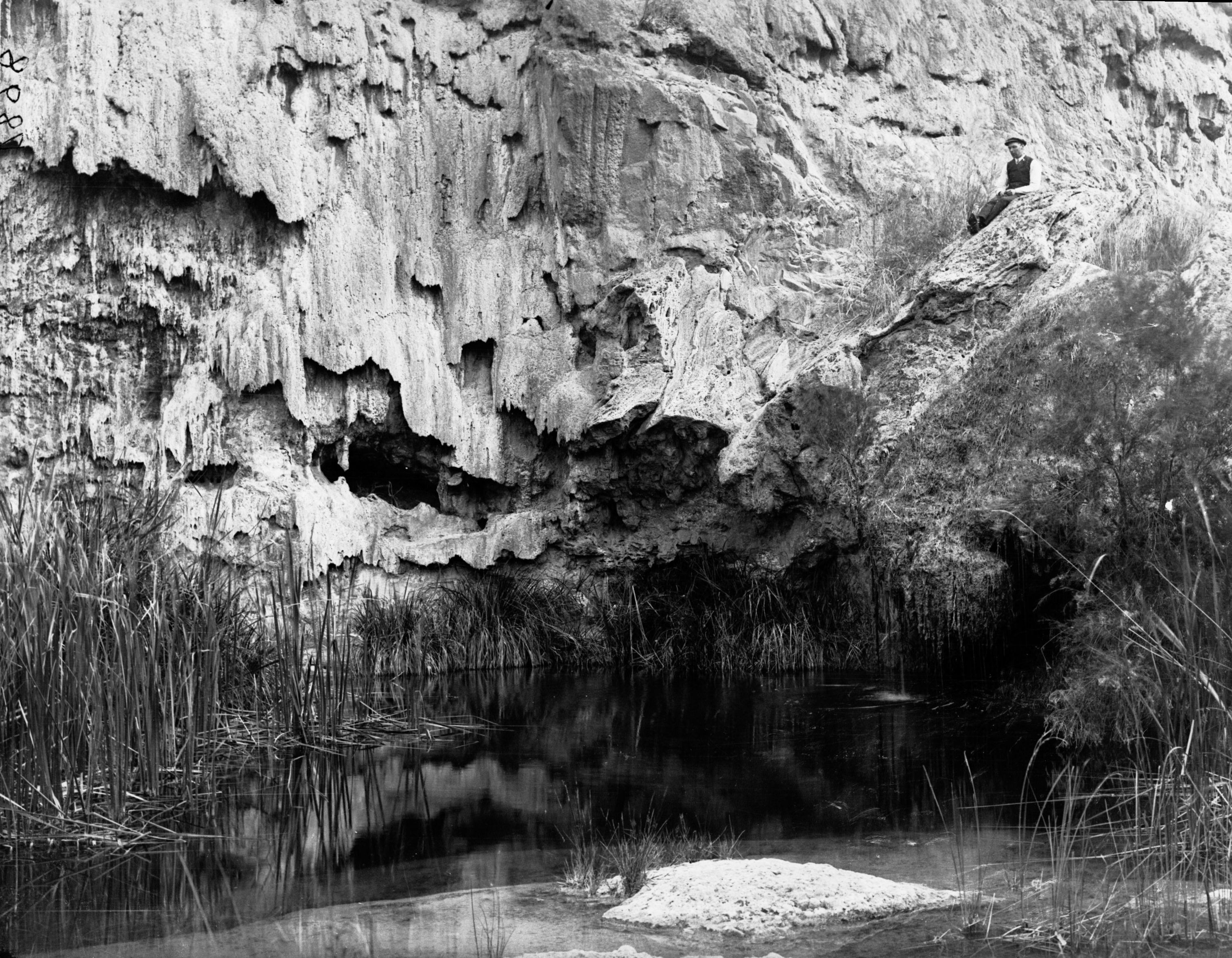
Mora Waters, ca. 1925

The property encompasses the very top of Wilpena Pound and goes as far west as Lake Torrens, and north to Beltana in the central Flinders Ranges.

It is about 43 kilometres (27 mi) north of Hawker and 57 kilometres (35 mi) south west of Blinman.

The Station is composed of a variety of hilly ranges, sandhills and clay plains country, with intermediate to large grass valleys, slopes and flats. Feed available to stock include black oak, Acacia, bullock bush, and other edible shrubs. Grasses include wallaby, windmill, millet, button, buffel, bindeyi and rootgrasses. The property has some permanent springs as well as 83 bores and is bisected by the Central Australia Railway.

The property currently occupies an area of 150,000 acres (234 sq mi; 607 km^{2}) and also offers tourist accommodation. The property has been owned by the Fels family since 1886 over five generations and in 1968 they opened up the property to tourists. The Fels family are extremely accomplished bushmen due to long establishment in the outback.

Joseph Auguste Robert Fels sold off A 4,000 acres (1,619 ha) portion of the property in 1905. The section had two wells and had not been stocked for three years at the time of sale.

In 1949 the property had been placed on the market by Philip Leo Fels Sr. when it occupied an area of 22,245 acres (9,002 ha) and was divided into six sheep-proof paddocks. It had a four bedrooms homestead and a galvanized iron woolshed end was equipped with three water wells.

The original Merna Mora run was increased in size in 1978 with the purchase of Wintabatinya station (formally Bosworths Lake station, of which Sidney Kidman held an interest). and again in 1993 with the purchase of Motpena station to give a total area of 290,000 acres, making it one of the largest pastoral properties in South Australia.

== See also ==
- List of ranches and stations
