= Finniss River (South Australia) =

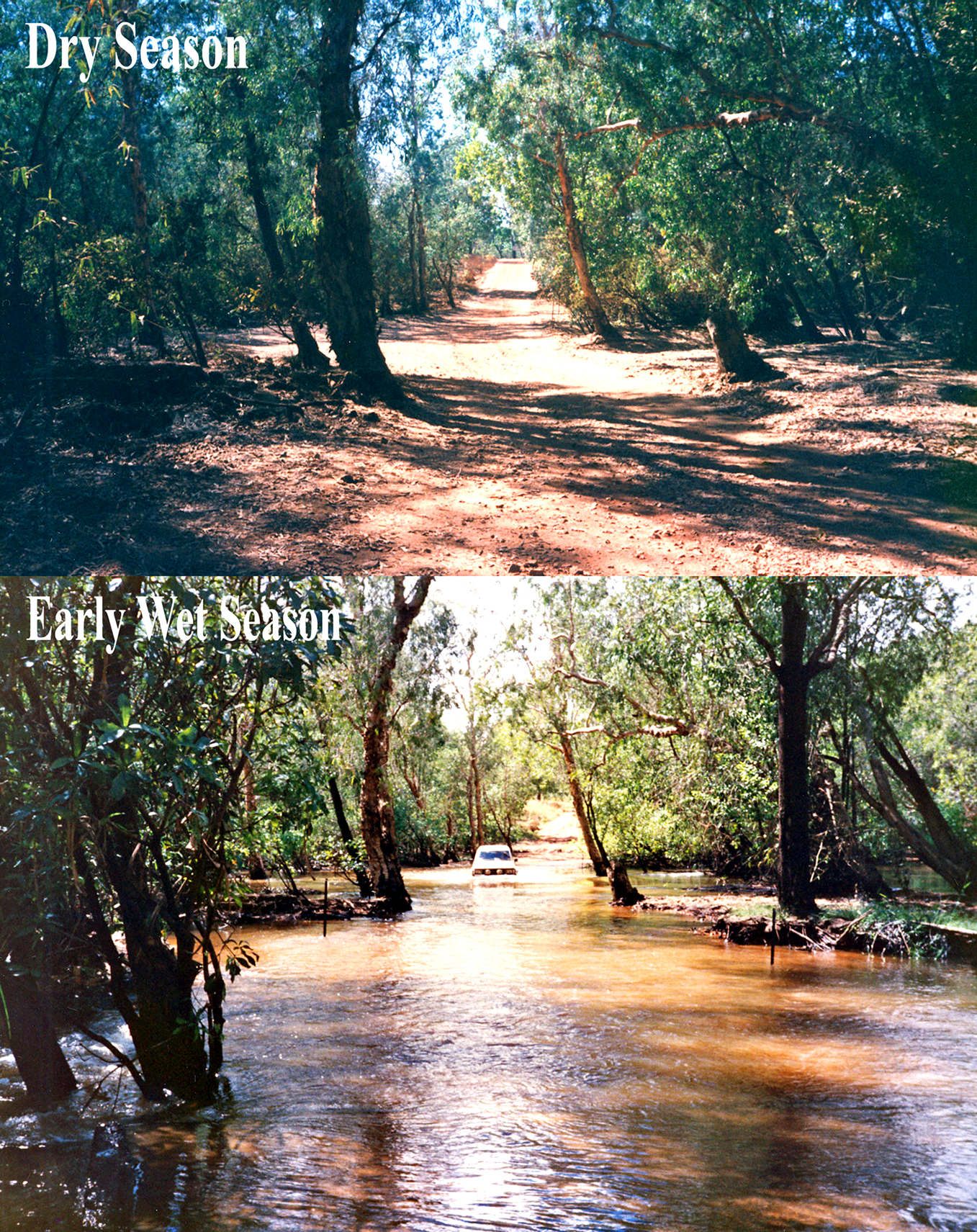

- Location within South Australia
- Etymology: Boyle Travers Finniss

Location
- Country: Australia
- State: South Australia

Physical characteristics
- Source
  - location: Mount Magnificent
  - coordinates: 35°18′39″S 138°38′21″E
- Mouth: Lake Alexandrina
  - location: Clayton Bay
  - coordinates: 35.4807°S 138.8905°E
  - elevation: 0.7 m
- Length: 50.1 km (31.1 mi)

Basin features
- River system: Murray–Darling basin

The Finniss River drains part of the east side of Fleurieu Peninsula into Lake Alexandrina in South Australia. It is part of the Murray–Darling basin.

The Finniss River starts east of Yundi and flows roughly east to its mouth in the Goolwa Channel of the lower Murray River, opposite Hindmarsh Island. It supports a wide range of flora (both natural and introduced weed species) and macroinvertebrates despite much of the catchment being cleared and grazed.

During the 2006–2010 drought, low water levels in Lake Alexandrina and the outflows of the Finniss River and Currency Creek exposed acid sulfate soils which would normally be submerged. Temporary flow regulators were installed in August–September 2009 across the Goolwa Channel to maintain the water level to keep these soils wet to prevent more acid being leached out. They were partially removed in September 2010 and completely by October 2012.

Watchalunga Nature Reserve, established in 2015, is in the lower reaches of the Finniss River, where it provides swampland habitat for the Mount Lofty Ranges Southern Emu-wren, an endangered species, and the southern bell frog, which is a threatened species.
