= Heysen Trail =

Long-distance trail in Australia

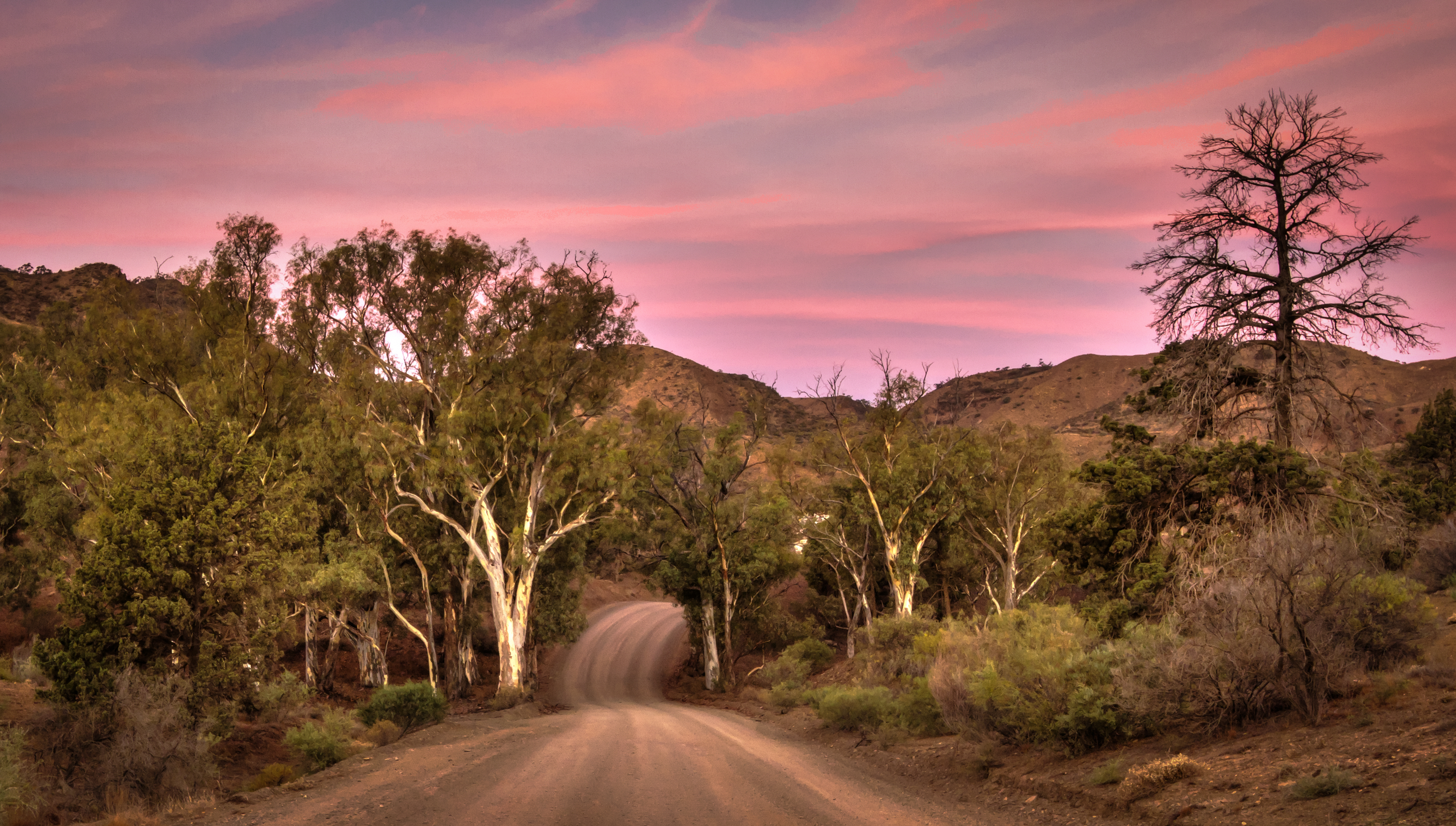
- Parachilna Gorge, the northern trailhead
- Length: 1,200 km (750 mi)
- Location: South Australia; *Flinders Ranges; *Mount Lofty Ranges; *Fleurieu Peninsula
- Established: 1978
- Trailheads: Parachilna Gorge; Cape Jervis
- Use: Hiking
- Season: sections are closed during summer
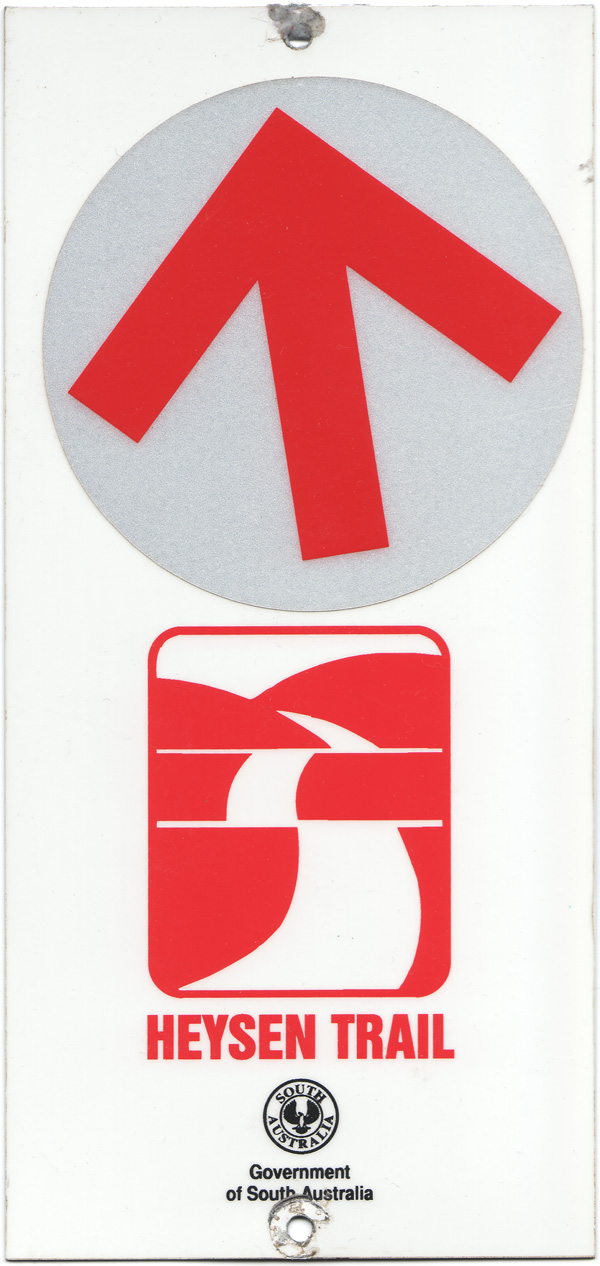
- Waymark: One of the many signposts marking the Heysen Trail.
- Sights: Wilpena Pound; Former Monster Mine at Burra; Pichi Richi Pass; Barossa Valley; Mount Lofty; Encounter Bay; Backstairs Passage
- Surface: natural
- Website: http://heysentrail.asn.au/

The Heysen Trail is a long distance walking trail in South Australia. It runs from Parachilna Gorge, in the Flinders Ranges via the Adelaide Hills to Cape Jervis on the Fleurieu Peninsula and is approximately 1,200 kilometres (750 mi) in length.

== Route summary ==
From north to south, the route of the trail may be summarised by the following landmarks in order: Parachilna Gorge - Flinders Ranges National Park - Hawker - Quorn - Mount Remarkable National Park - Melrose - Crystal Brook - Spalding - Burra - Kapunda - Adelaide Hills - Deep Creek Conservation Park - Cape Jervis

Due to bushfire risk, large sections of the trail are closed annually from December through to April.

Most people choose to walk sections of the track for one or a few days at a time. There are many places to stay along the trail and hardy walkers who walk the track from beginning to end typically do so in about 60 days.

The Friends of the Heysen Trail is a non-profit volunteer organisation dedicated to the maintenance, development and promotion of the Heysen Trail and other walking trails; and to the promotion of bushwalking as a healthy leisure activity.

A regular walking program is conducted by a walking sub-committee. Different grades of walks cater for beginners and for more experienced walkers.

== Geology and biology ==
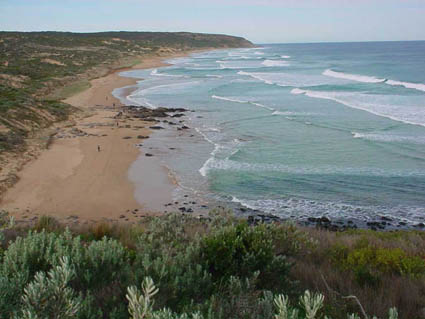
Waitpinga Beach, a part of the southernmost reach of the trail

The trail passes cliffs, farmland, natural bushland, forests, vineyards, and grazing land. It extends from the ocean through the fertile Mount Lofty Ranges across Goyder's Line to the arid Flinders Ranges, with many different bioregions.

== History ==
The trail was first suggested by Warren Bonython in 1969 but design was stalled by several years due to government politics and issues with private land owners. The first 50 kilometres of the track was laid through the Mount Lofty Ranges in 1978 after responsibility for the track was handed to the Department of Recreation and Sport. Terry Lavender was the main designer for the track and oversaw the majority of its construction until it was completed in 1992.

The trail is named after Sir Hans Heysen.

== Images ==
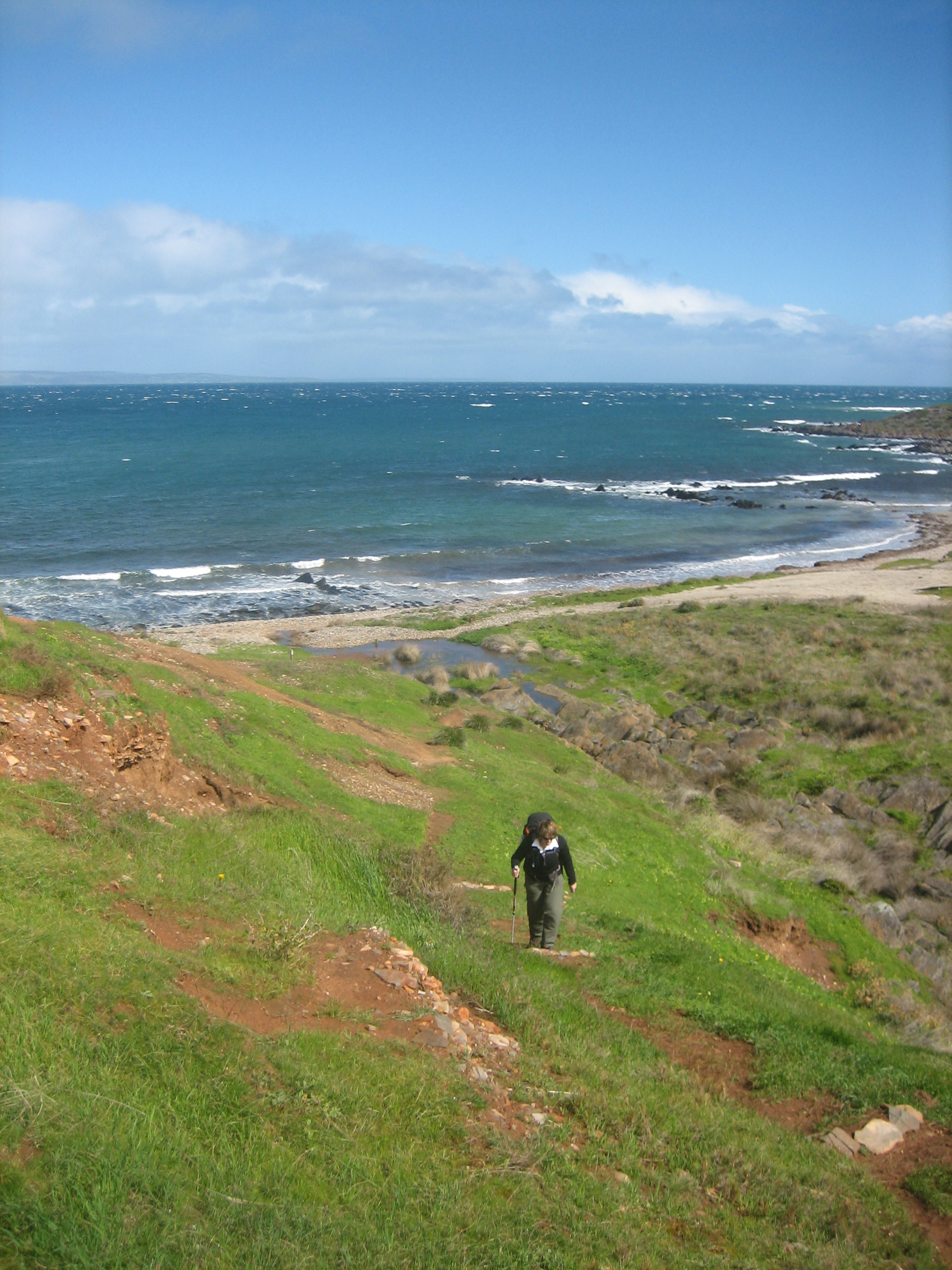
Near Victor Harbor, with Kangaroo Island visible on the left horizon

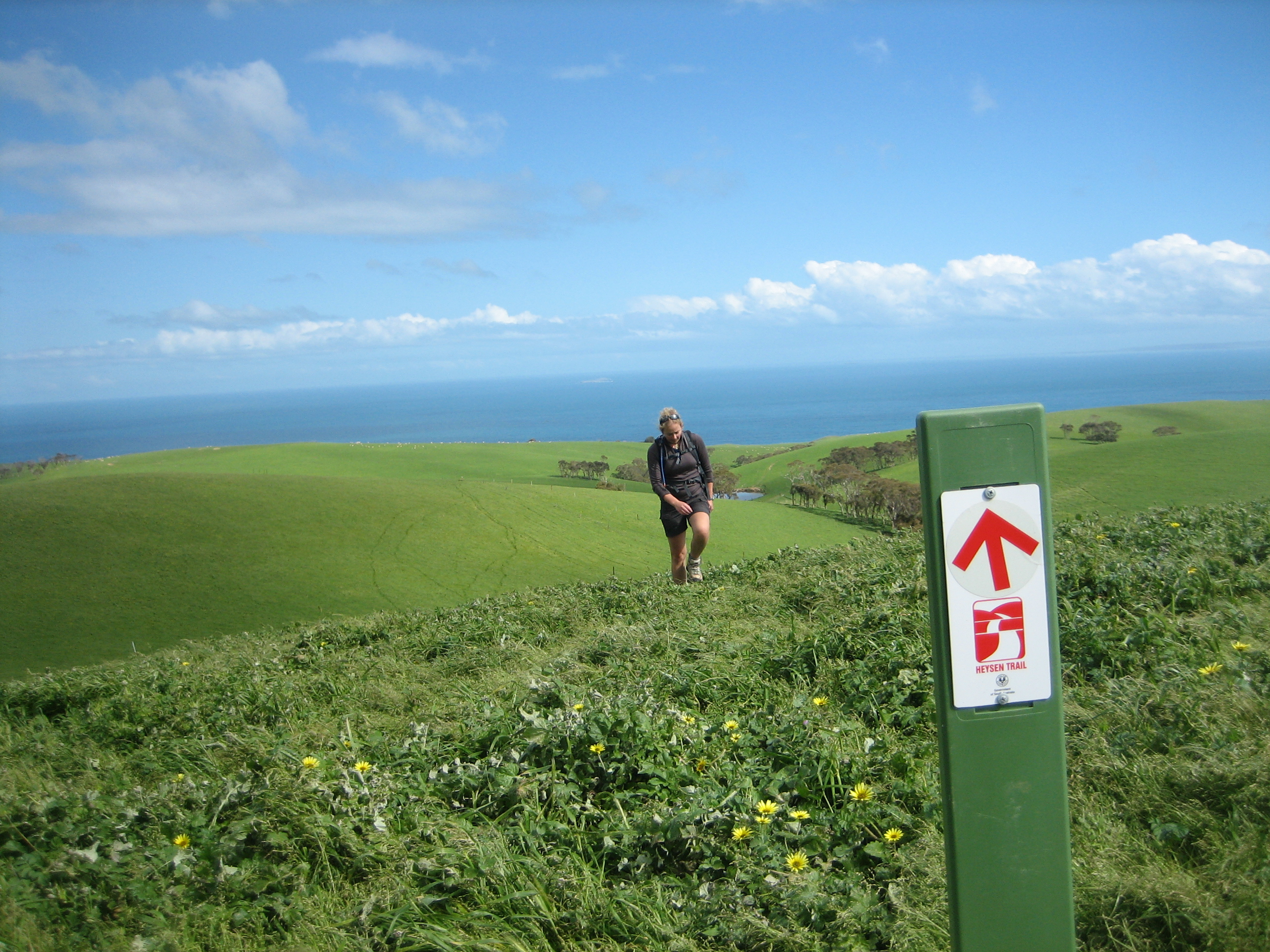
Hiking through farmland near Waitpinga

== See also ==
- The Dutchmans Stern Conservation Park
- Mount Brown (South Australia)
- Wapma Thura–Southern Flinders Ranges National Park
- Ikara–Flinders Ranges National Park
- Mount Remarkable National Park
- Kyeema Conservation Park
- Mount Magnificent Conservation Park
- Caroona Creek Conservation Park
- Hopkins Creek Conservation Park
- Kaiserstuhl Conservation Park
- Finniss Conservation Park
- List of long-distance hiking tracks in Australia
