= Mount Magnificent Conservation Park =

Protected area in South Australia

- IUCN category III (natural monument or feature)
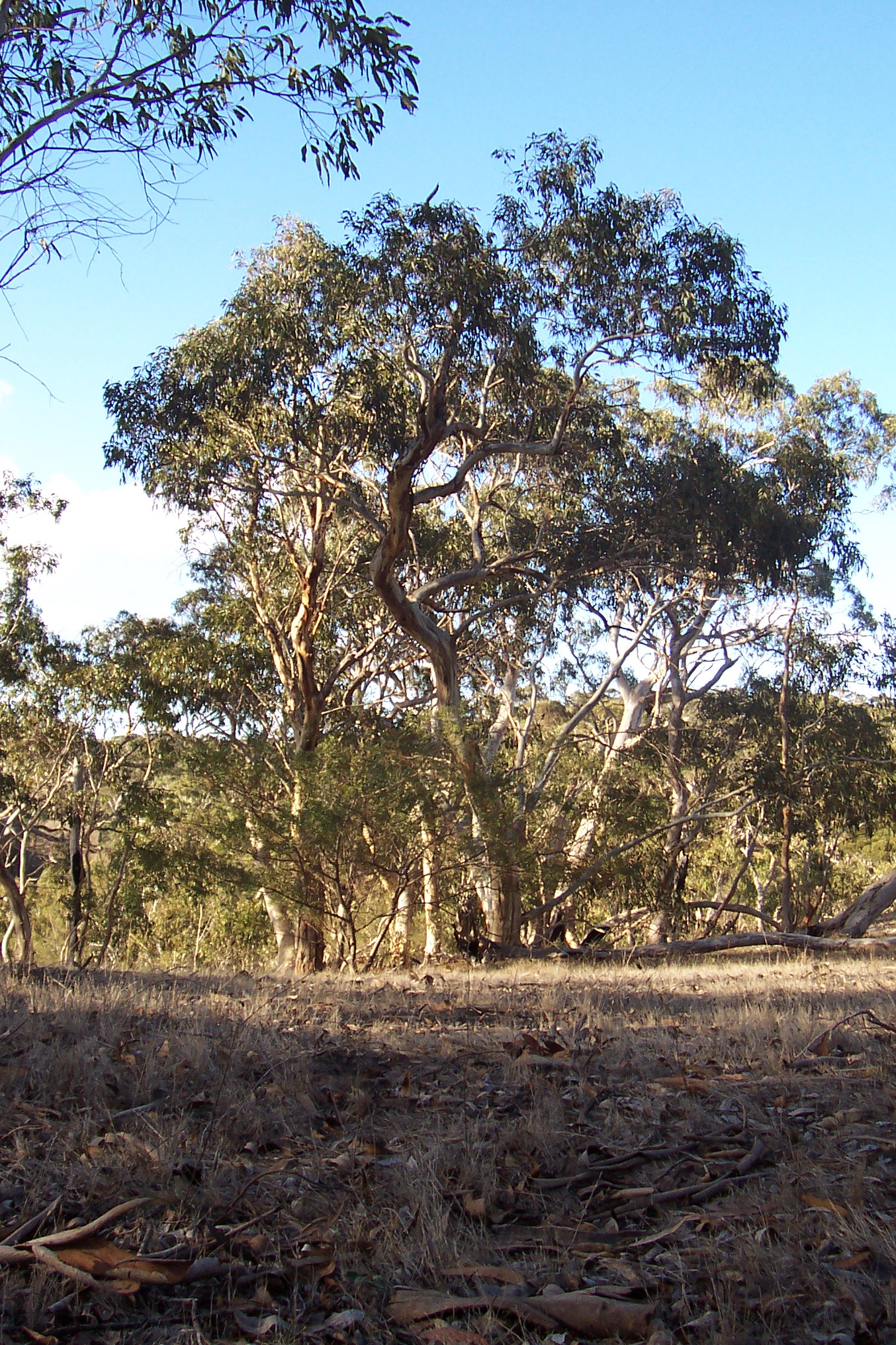
- The conservation park at Easter 2007

- Location within South Australia
- Location: South Australia
- Nearest city: Mount Compass
- Coordinates: 35°18′27″S 138°40′50″E
- Area: 90 ha (220 acres)
- Established: 10 August 1967
- Governing body: Department for Environment and Water

Mount Magnificent Conservation Park (formerly Mount Magnificent National Park) is a protected area in the Australian state of South Australia located in the Mount Lofty Ranges about 58 kilometres (36 miles) south of the state capital of Adelaide. It is located within the gazetted locality of Mount Magnificent.

The conservation park consists of land in section 293 in the cadastral unit of the Hundred of Kuitpo. It came into existence on 10 August 1967 as a national park by proclamation under the National Parks Act 1966 as the Mount Magnificent National Park. On 27 April 1972, it was reconstituted as the Mount Magnificent Conservation Park upon the proclamation of the National Parks and Wildlife Act 1972. Its name is derived from the mountain called Mount Magnificent which is located within its boundaries. As of 2016, it covered an area of 90 hectares (220 acres).

The conservation park is bounded to the west by the Blackfellows Creek Road and to the east by the Mount Magnificent Road. The Heysen Trail, the long distance walking trail, passes through the middle of the conservation park entering from the east via Mount Magnificent Road and exiting in the north-west corner onto Blackfellows Creek Road.

In 1980, it was described as follows:

Mount Magnificent Conservation Park comprises the north-western slopes of Mount Magnificent which rises to 380m above sea level. The relatively flat land along the western boundary of the park carries stringybark low open forest (Eucalyptus baxteri, E obliqua). With increasing gradient in an easterly direction, trees of E fasciculosa, E leucoxylon and E huberana form a woodland formation with a grassy understorey. Walking tracks provide access for visitors to the park. The stringybark association which occupies the lower elevations of the park contains a great variety of sclerophyllous shrubs including the two species of Banksia which occur in South Australia.

The conservation park is classified as an IUCN Category III protected area. In 1980, it was listed on the now-defunct Register of the National Estate.

== See also ==
- Protected areas of South Australia
- Finniss Conservation Park
