= Edeowie glass =

Natural glass found in South Australia

Edeowie glass is a natural glass, or lechatelierite, found in the Australian state of South Australia. It is slag-like, opaque material found as vesicular free forms or sheet-like/ropy masses. It is located throughout a semi-continuous swath in baked pod-like clay-bearing sediment in an area of about 55 kilometres (34 mi) long by 10 kilometres (6.2 mi) along the western side of the Flinders Ranges near Parachilna and east of Lake Torrens. The region in which this glass is found is mostly restricted to concentrations correlated to the ancient shoreline terrace sequence at the locality. It is typically black in appearance, but can occur as variegated grey-green with various streak-like impurities. Pale grey and red-brownish surfaces can be caused by chemical weathering (oxidation, mineralization) and devitrification.

== Origin ==
Proposed origins for Edeowie and other similar lechatelierites include Pleistocene grassland fires, lightning strikes, or hypervelocity impact by one or several asteroids or comets. Some features, such as planar deformation features (PDFs) in quartz crystals found within and associated with Edeowie glass, are usually caused by extreme pressures and temperatures.

== Interval of formation ==
Edeowie glass yields dates spanning 0.67–0.07 mya (~670,000–70,000 BP), but some outlier dates are as recent as the middle Holocene.

== See also ==
- Darwin glass
- Fulgurite
- Impactite
- Libyan desert glass
- Shocked quartz
