= Blinman =

- Town
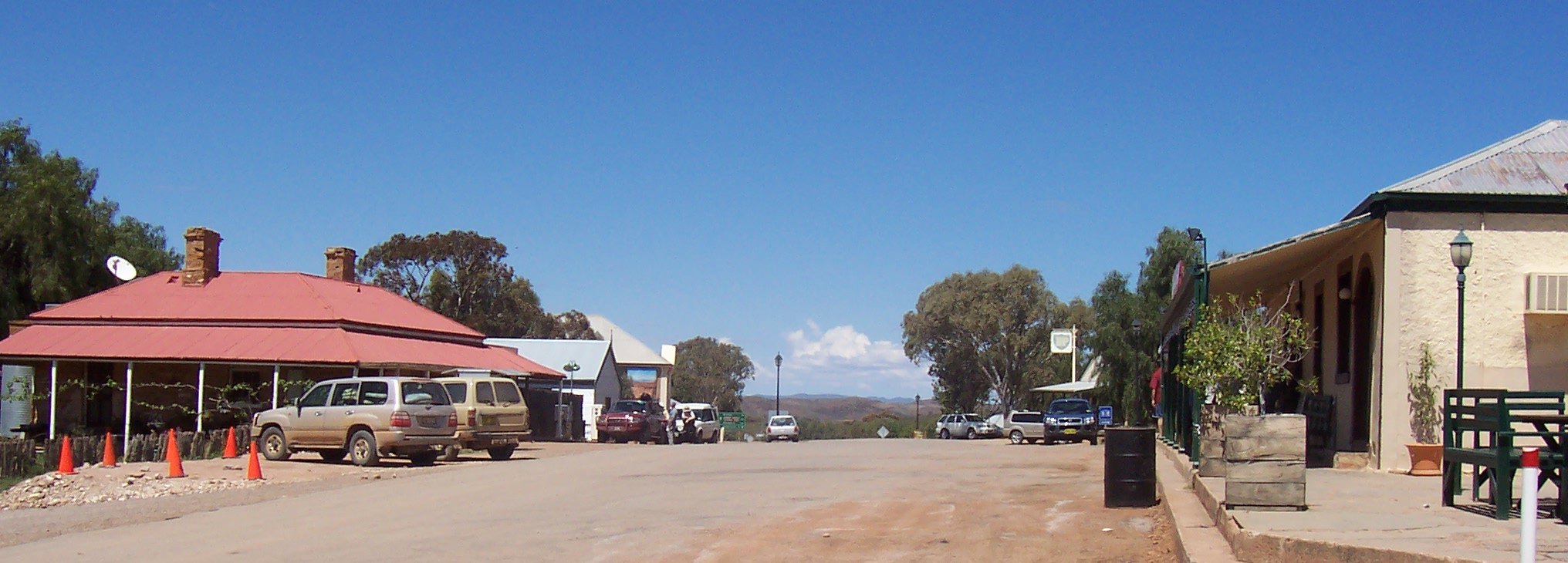
- Blinman's main street

- Coordinates: 31°05′37.1″S 138°40′41″E
- Country: Australia
- State: South Australia
- Region: Far North
- LGA: Pastoral Unincorporated Area
- Location: 425 km (264 mi) north of Adelaide
- Established: 1864 (Blinman); 1867 (Blinman North); 23 October 2003 (locality)

Government
  - State electorate: Stuart
  - Federal division: Grey
- Elevation: 610 m (2,000 ft)

Population
  - Total: 43 (SAL 2021)
- Time zone: UTC+9:30 (ACST)
  - Summer (DST): ACDT
- Postcode: 5730
- County: Taunton
- Mean max temp: 26.4 °C (79.5 °F)
- Mean min temp: 12.8 °C (55.0 °F)
- Annual rainfall: 223.9 mm (8.81 in)
Localities around Blinman
Oratunga Station	Oratunga Station; Angorigina	Angorigina
Oratunga Station; Alpana	Blinman	Angorigina
Gum Creek Station	Gum Creek Station; Angorigina	Angorigina
- Locations; Adjoining localities

Blinman is a locality incorporating two towns in the Australian state of South Australia within the Flinders Ranges about 425 kilometres (264 mi) north of the state capital of Adelaide. It includes the highest surveyed town in South Australia, with a population in the 2021 census of 43. It serves as a base for large-acre pastoralists and tourism. Blinman is just north of the Flinders Ranges National Park, 60 kilometres (37 miles) north of Wilpena Pound. It is named after Robert Blinman, the shepherd who discovered its mineral resource.

The two towns were Blinman and Blinman North until 1986, when Blinman was re-named Blinman South and Blinman North was re-named Blinman.

== History ==
Blinman is situated on the traditional lands of the Adnyamathanha tribe of Indigenous Australians, who were its custodians for thousands of years. One of their customs was burn-offs (controlled bushfires) to promote future plant growth.

The first European settlement around what is now Blinman was Angorichina Station, taken up for sheep farming in the 1850s. A shepherd employed by the station, Robert Blinman, discovered a copper outcrop on a hot December day in 1859. Blinman gambled some of his money on the presence of more underground copper and received a mineral licence in 1860. In 1861, Blinman and three friends, Alfred Frost, Joe Mole and Henry Alfred, received the surface lease for the land that became Blinman.

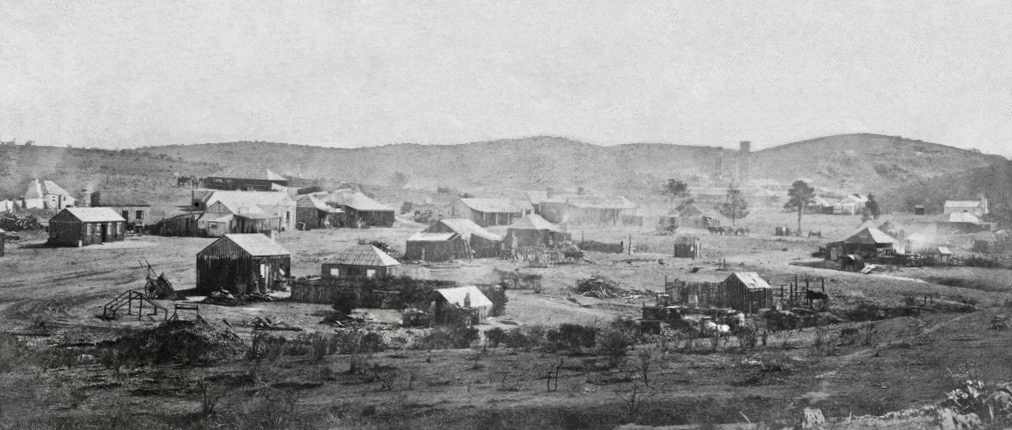
The Blinman mine in 1871

Mining was successful in the first year, when the mine became known as Wheal Blinman. The original four leaseholders sold their mine in 1862 for about 150 times their purchase price. The new owners were the Yudnamutana Copper Mining Company of South Australia, which also owned a rich deposit north of Blinman. The mine was very successful during the 1860s and the site became permanent, with buildings being constructed and more miners moving to the area, some from the Burra mine. The biggest challenges at the time were the transport of ore and the finding of water. During the next 20 years, wells were sunk at regular intervals to refresh the animals hauling the ore. In 1881, construction of the Central Australia Railway reached Parachilna, 25 kilometres (16 miles) to the west of the mine, overcoming the tyranny of the 200 kilometres (120 miles) journey over rough dirt tracks to Port Augusta.

Family life was hard in the early days. Locally, water and firewood had to be brought long distances. This job was left to the women and their elder children while the men were working. Many pregnancies failed in the early years and several deaths were reported from "inflammation of the lungs". With the original tent settlement being very close to the mine, it was impossible to escape the fine dust generated.

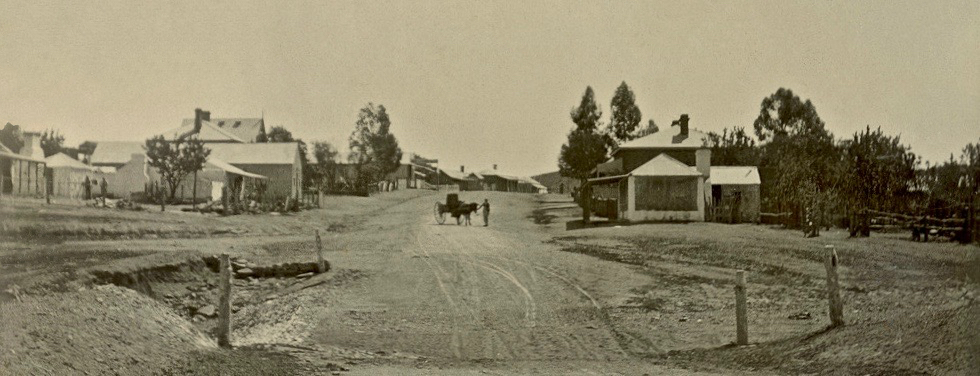
Blinman's main street circa 1897

A hotel and post office were first opened in Blinman in 1863. In 1864, a government surveyor laid out 162 allotments about 3 kilometres (1.9 miles) from the mine, following which it was named Blinman. The population was about 1500 by 1868 and the first school opened that year. Substantial shops were built in the main street in 1869. The striking of regular water in the mine the same year secured a regular water supply for the town.

Mining continued until 1918, when the ore ran out. The busiest time for the mine was 1913–1918, when the town population had grown to about 2000. The total ore removed from the mines was about 10,000 tonnes.

=== Nomenclature of localities ===
The locality of Blinman consists of land occupying the northern end of the cadastral unit of the Hundred of Carr and includes the government (ie, government-surveyed) towns of Blinman and Blinman South – surveyed in 1864 – which according to the official database, are still located about 2 kilometres (1.2 mi) apart along the Flinders Ranges Way. The government town of Blinman was surveyed in 1864 without an accompanying government proclamation. The government town of Blinman North was surveyed in July 1867 on nearby land and also was not the subject of an official proclamation. In 1986, the former Blinman was renamed Blinman South, and the former Blinman North was renamed Blinman.

In 2003, the Government of South Australia proclaimed the locality of Blinman, incorporating both towns within new boundaries. In 2013, additional land was added to the locality.

=== Heritage-listed sites ===
Blinman has a number of heritage-listed sites, including:

- Blinman Dome Diapir
- Blinman Mine and Mine Manager's Cottage
- Mine Road Dwelling and Dugout.

== Attractions ==
Tourists travel to this area to enjoy the Outback of South Australia and to see the ancient geology of the area. The town is close to Brachina Gorge and Parachilna Gorge. These two rarely have flowing water in them. Also nearby are the Blinman Pools. The town is a stop-off on the way to Arkaroola. The copper mine at one end of the town is a popular attraction.

Blinman itself has a pub, general store, a church and a cafe/gallery. There are tennis courts, a golf course and a cricket pitch, though they see sporadic use. Fuel is not available in the town.

=== Cook Out Back festival ===
Cook Out Back is a relaxed campfire cooking competition held over the Labour Day long weekend in October, involving a roast prepared using a camp oven on a bed of coals. The event attracts more than 500 people to the town, who camp throughout the area. As the biggest event on the town's calendar, it brings significant tourist income.

== Governance ==
Blinman is located within the federal division of Grey, the state electoral district of Stuart and the Pastoral Unincorporated Area of South Australia. As of 2019, the community within Blinman received municipal services from a South Australian government agency, the Outback Communities Authority.

The Aboriginal Regional Authority for the Blinman area is the Adnyamathanha Traditional Lands Association.

== Utilities ==
The water delivered by the local municipal water system is considered "non-drinking" water and is not considered suitable for drinking, food preparation, or cleaning teeth.

== In popular culture ==
- In the 2011 novel Angorichina, the character of Heath Denbow came from, and was buried at, Blinman.
- Blinman was the setting for Fleur McDonald’s novel Indigo Storm in 2016.

== See also ==
- Brachina meteorite (1974)
- Central Australia Railway (stopping place at Brachina)
