= Pimba, South Australia =

Pimba
- Town
- Pimba station and cattle train, circa 1918

- Coordinates: 31°15′18″S 136°47′59″E
- Country: Australia
- State: South Australia
- Region: Far North
- LGA: Pastoral Unincorporated Area
- Location: 441 km (274 mi) north of Adelaide; 13 km (8.1 mi) south of Woomera
- Established: 9 July 2004 (locality)

Government
  - State electorate: Giles
  - Federal division: Grey

Population
  - Total: 25 (SAL 2021)
- Time zone: UTC+9:30 (ACST)
  - Summer (DST): UTC+10:30 (ACST)
- Postcode: 5720
- Mean max temp: 25.8 °C (78.4 °F)
- Mean min temp: 12.7 °C (54.9 °F)
- Annual rainfall: 182.2 mm (7.17 in)
Localities around Pimba
Arcoona	Woomera	Arcoona
Glendambo	Pimba	Arcoona
Arcoona	Arcoona	Arcoona
- Location; Adjoining localities

Pimba is a small settlement lying on the transcontinental railway line in the Australian state of South Australia. It lies at the junction of the Stuart Highway to Alice Springs and the road to Woomera, Roxby Downs and Andamooka. It is 441 kilometres (274 mi) from Adelaide.

Pimba lies within the Arcoona pastoral lease, and is 6 kilometres (3.7 mi) south of Woomera.

On the Stuart Highway, it is the only service centre between Port Augusta 175 kilometres (109 mi) to the south, and Glendambo 140 kilometres (87 mi) to the west. There is an iconic roadhouse, named "Spud's Roadhouse", which sells fuel and general shop items and meals and has accommodation.

Pimba was originally established as a construction camp for the transcontinental railway in the early 20th century and was retained as a railway siding. It is reported as being surveyed as a township during the 1960s and was gazetted as a locality in August 2004 under the Geographical Names Act 1991 with creation of boundaries along with the retention of the "long established name".

Great Southern Rail's Indian Pacific (running between Sydney and Perth) and The Ghan (running between Adelaide, Alice Springs and Darwin) trains still pass Pimba Siding but do not stop; both trains pass the town twice a week in each direction.

Pimba is located within the federal division of Grey, the state electoral district of Giles and the Pastoral Unincorporated Area of South Australia. As of 2016, the community within Pimba received municipal services from a South Australian agency, the Outback Communities Authority.
