= Collinsville =

There are a number of cities or towns named Collinsville:

== Australia ==
- Collinsville, Queensland, a rural town in the Whitsunday Region
- Collinsville, South Australia, a locality.
  - Collinsville Station, a pastoral lease in South Australia associated with Collinsville, South Australia.

== United States ==
- Collinsville, Alabama
- Collinsville, California
- Collinsville, Connecticut
- Collinsville, Georgia
- Collinsville, Illinois, the largest US city named Collinsville
  - Collinsville Township, Madison County, Illinois
- Collinsville, Mississippi
- Collinsville, Ohio
- Collinsville, Oklahoma
- Collinsville, Texas
- Collinsville, Virginia
