= Mount Eba Station =

Pastoral lease in South Australia

Coordinates: 30.179°S 135.664°E

Location in South Australia

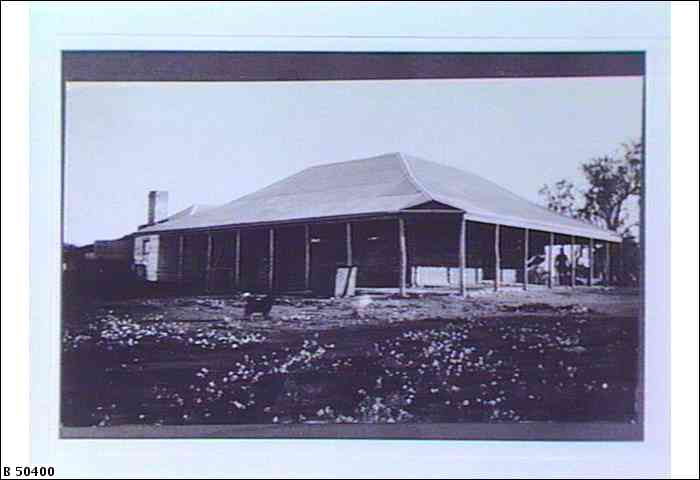
Mount Eba Homestead ca.1912

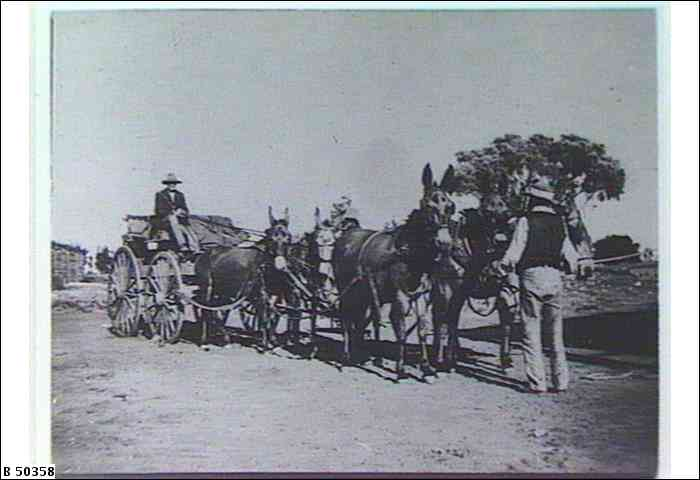
Mules cart, Mt. Eba ca.1880

Mount Eba Station is a pastoral lease in outback South Australia that operates as a sheep station.

It is located approximately 125 kilometres (78 mi) north west of Roxby Downs and 158 kilometres (98 mi) south east of Coober Pedy. It shares boundaries with Millers Creek Station to the north, The Twins Station to the west, Bon Bon Reserve to the south, and Parakylia Station to the east. The property is named for the solitary hill that rises 400 feet (122 m) from the surrounding plains. The plains are mostly vegetated with mulga and saltbush, with salt pans interspersed throughout. Currently the property occupies an area of 3,380 square kilometres (1,305 sq mi).

== History ==
Mount Eba was established by Price Maurice in 1874. At this time it encompassed as area of 5,538 square miles (14,343 km^{2}) but was extremely isolated and had uncertain rainfall. Despite the high costs Maurice sank 83 wells of which 36 produced good water. The property was stocked intensively from 1878 to 1880, with numerous improvements, including the construction of buildings and a new woolshed, being completed. In 1879 there were between 80 and 100 men employed at Mount Eba. By 1884 the property was stocked with 18,500 sheep, 750 cattle and 270 horses.

By 1901 the lease had been abandoned, like many others in the area, but left under a caretaker. The property encompassed 1,900 square miles (4,921 km^{2}) at that time. By 1908 the property occupied an area of approximately 630 square miles (1,632 km^{2}) and was stocked with 5,000 sheep.

By 1914 the lessee was James Gemmel, who had rigged up a motor to his windmills to have sufficient water for his sheep.

After World War I, but before 1923, the Jacob brothers acquired Mount Eba. At this time the 3,000-square-mile (7,770 km^{2}) property was mostly running cattle, but the Jacobs intended to make the move back to sheep. The station by this time incorporated the Boolgunnia and The Twins pastoral leases.

In 1939 Grant Matheson was the manager and part-owner. Matheson joined the RAAF during World War II and served as a squadron leader. He still owned the property in 1945. The property suffered a terrible drought from 1940 to 1944, with thousands of sheep dying. By 1947 H.R. Crombie was managing Mount Eba, although its size had been reduced from over 2,000 square miles (5,180 km^{2}) to 850 square miles (2,201 km^{2}).

The property was once a small township when it was owned by the Crombie family in the 1950s. There were dozens of staff for the Woomera Rocket Range, as well as about thirty station-hands, housekeeping staff, and a bookkeeper.

The property was acquired in 1979 by the Nitschke family who also owned neighbouring Millers Creek Station. Part of the Millers Creek lease was added in 1994.

By 2007 the Prominent Hill mining lease commenced and parts of the station had to be destocked. By 2014 Mount Eba was on the market. At that time it was stocked with 11,000 merino sheep and 300 cattle. Mount Eba was the last property that had been owned by the Nitschkes to be sold.

The land occupying the extent of the Mount Eba Station pastoral lease was gazetted as a locality in April 2013 under the name 'Mount Eba'.

== See also ==
- List of ranches and stations
