= Hugh Piper =

Australian documentary filmmaker

Hugh Piper is an Australian documentary filmmaker and writer/director. He is best known for his documentaries "Dancing With Dictators", "Mr. Sin: The Abe Saffron Story" and Submariners.

== Filmography ==
- Outback Coroner, A multi-part series about mysterious and unexplained deaths in remote locations around Australia.
- "Dancing With Dictators", about Australian publisher Ross Dunkley and his struggles in Burma, set against the background of that country's first election in twenty years.
- "Mr. Sin: The Abe Saffron Story", about the man who brought Sinatra, rock 'n roll, and organized crime to Australia.
- The Post, about Cambodia's Phnom Penh Post newspaper.
- Double Concerto, about classical music and politics.
- Australia's Outback, a year in the life of an outback cattle station (narrated by Mel Gibson).
- Cracking The Colour Code, a three-part French-Australian co-production taking a multi-disciplinary approach to examining the science, anthropology, history, and philosophy of colour.
- Submariners, a six-part series about a three-month journey in a Collins-class submarine from Perth, Western Australia to Korea, Japan, and Hawaii.
- A Case for the Coroner, a six-part series examining the work of the Coroner's Court of New South Wales, State Coroner John Abernethy, and his search for the answers to unexplained deaths.
- Crime Scene Bangkok, about the work of flamboyant forensic scientist Pornthip Rojanasunand, who is fighting entrenched corruption to establish an effective forensic system in Thailand.
