= Billa Kalina =

Pastoral lease in South Australia

Coordinates: 29.9148°S 136.189°E

Location in South Australia

Billa Kalina Station is a pastoral lease that once operated as a sheep station but now operates as a cattle station in outback South Australia.

It is located approximately 95 kilometres (59 mi) north west of Roxby Downs and 130 kilometres (81 mi) south east of Coober Pedy. The property shares boundaries with Anna Creek to the north, Stuart Creek Stations to the east, Parakylia to the south and Miller's Creek Station to the west. It is also situated within the Woomera Rocket Range and the dog fence passes through the property.

Currently the property includes the Millers' Creek lease and occupies an area of 7,000 square kilometres (2,703 sq mi). It has been run by the same family for 70 years and is running approximately 2,000 head of shorthorn cattle and about 3,000 head of Dorper ewes all of which are raised in an organic environment. In 2012 the property was owned by Colin Greenfield.

The property was open for application in 1937. Billa Kalina encompassing an area of 1,495 square miles (3,872 km^{2}) along with another stations that were formerly part of the lease now called Mudla Station with an area of 534 square miles (1,383 km^{2}).

The area was struck by drought for nearly a decade when rains came in 2009. The Greenfields had reduced his stock down to 300 breeders which he intended to agist further south when the rains arrived.

The land occupying the extent of the Billa Kalina pastoral lease was gazetted by the Government of South Australia as a locality in April 2013 under the name "Billa Kalina".

== See also ==
- List of ranches and stations
- List of the largest stations in Australia
