= Roxby Downs Station =

Roxby Downs Station South Australia
- Coordinates: 30.7°S 136.7°E
- Established: 1910
- Location: 20 km (12 mi) southwest of Roxby Downs (township)

Roxby Downs Station was a pastoral lease in central northern South Australia.

The land that became Roxby Downs Station is the traditional country of the Kokatha people. After European colonisation, it was part of Parakylia station, or perhaps Andamooka Station. In about 1910, it became a separate station and was given the name "Roxby Downs" by its initial owner, Norman Richardson, apparently after the town of Roxby, Queensland, from where the first cattle for the station were said to have come.

On 10 December 1910, the Adelaide Observer wrote: "Norman Richardson has the Chance Swamp and the Sister's Well paddock, once a portion of the old Parakylia run, as well as Lake Campbell country, in all an area of 350 square miles. This he has called Roxby Downs..."

With the development of the Olympic Dam mine and the associated service town of Roxby Downs, the station was taken over by BHP, which remains the present owner of the pastoral lease.
