= Outback (disambiguation) =

The Outback is the vast, remote interior of Australia.

Outback may also refer to:

== Fictional entities ==
- Outback (G.I. Joe)
- Outback (Transformers)

== Literature ==
- "Out Back", 1893 poem by Henry Lawson

== Film and TV ==
- Outback, alternative title for Wake in Fright, a 1971 Australian-American film
- Outback, alternative title for Minnamurra, a 1989 Australian film
- The Outback, alternative title for Prey, a 2009 Australian film
- The Outback, alternative title for Koala Kid, a 2012 CG animated film
- Outback Truckers, alternative title for Outback Truckers, a 2012– TV series
- "The Outback", an episode of Peppa Pig

== Places ==
- Outback (Region), a regional area of the Local Government Association of South Australia
- Nebraska Outback, remote rural parts of north-central Nebraska
- Oregon Outback, the high desert region of southeastern Oregon
- Outback, a term for a rural area

== Sports ==
- Australian Outbacks, the national gridiron team
- Outback Champions Series, professional tennis events

== Other uses ==
- Outback (group), a 1980s musical group
- Outback Steakhouse, an American restaurant chain
- Subaru Outback, a SUV (automobile)
- Outback (album)
- Outback (lesbian newsletter), a Cornish newsletter focused on lesbian culture

== See also ==
- R.M. Williams Outback, an Australian magazine
- Outback Communities Authority, a government agency in South Australia
- Outbacking, a term for outdoor recreation
