= Anglo-Australian Joint Project =

Anglo-Australian Joint Project was a military project in which the United Kingdom and Australia participated from 1946 to 1980. The project's highest profile activity was the Long Range Weapons Establishment at Woomera. The project was initiated under the Australian Prime Minister Ben Chifley. This participation by the Australian Ministry of Defence was a significant factor in the shaping of the Australian Defence Organisation.

== Origins ==
The V-2 rocket was the first use of a ballistic missile in actual warfare. British Intelligence had heard of a project based at Peenemünde, located on a German island in the Baltic Sea. The rumours suggested this was a major rocket project capable of firing ballistic missiles capable of carrying large warheads far enough to reach the British Isles. However as this was far beyond the capabilities of British military research or that of any of their allies, Lord Cherwell, the top British adviser suggested the rumours were disinformation to hide another military research goal.

== Implementation ==
The project implemented the Long Range Weapons Establishment. This was located within the Woomera Prohibited Area whose restrictions were introduced by the in 1946.
