= Stuart Creek Station =

Pastoral lease in South Australia

Coordinates: 29.7167°S 137.033°E

Location in South Australia

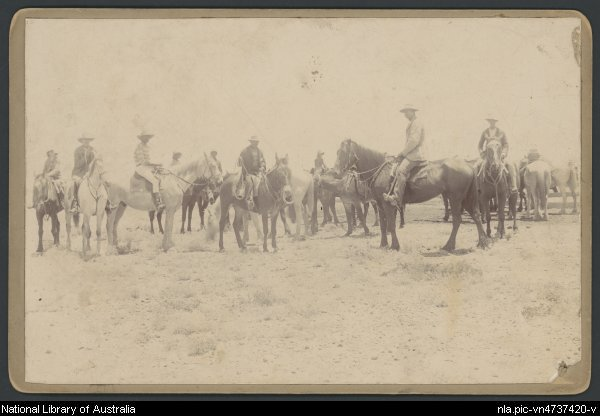
Musterers on horseback, Stuart Creek Station, 1897

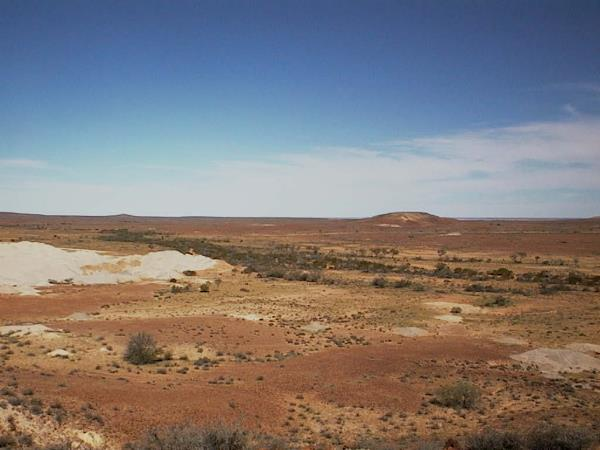
Stuart Creek with Lake Torrens in the background

Stuart Creek Station is a pastoral lease that once operated as a sheep station. It now operates as a cattle station in outback South Australia.

== Description ==
It is located approximately 40 kilometres (25 mi) north of Roxby Downs and 140 kilometres (87 mi) north west of Lyndhurst. The property is bounded to the north by Lake Eyre South, to the east by Billa Kalina Station, the south by Mulagaria and Andamooka Stations and to the east by Finniss Springs Aboriginal lands. The ephemeral watercourse, Stuart Creek, runs through the property.

The property is a mixture of land types including sandhills, breakaways, mound springs and gibber plains.

Currently the lease is held by BHP and occupies an area of 6,500 square kilometres (2,510 sq mi).

== History ==
The first European to pass through the area was John McDouall Stuart in 1858 who named the Creek Chambers Creek. He was awarded a claim in the area and the creek was later renamed Stuart Creek. By 1862 Stuart was in ill-health and sold his claim to Alfred Barker and John Chambers. Barker stocked the property, but suffered significant stock losses during the drought of the late 1860s and early 1870s. The drought that struck from 1864 to 1865 was broken by floods in 1866. John Howard Angus acquired the property in 1870.

W. Rose drove 1,260 cattle from Newcastle Waters Station to Stuart Creek, a distance of 1,000 miles (1,609 km), over a 12-week period in 1910. The feat was considered a droving record of the time. In 1911 the property was owned by the Willowie Pastoral Company and managed by Mr Paxton. At this time it occupied an area of approximately 5,000 square miles (12,950 km^{2}) and was experiencing a good season. About 23 bores had been sunk on the station. The company put the property up for auction of 1916, when it occupied an area of 5,934 square kilometres (2,291 sq mi), but it was passed in and remained unsold.

By 1918 it was acquired by the Kidman family, who retained possession for the next 80 years. The property was an outstation of Anna Creek Station until it was partitioned in 1998. A 1,000-square-kilometre (386 sq mi) northern portion was absorbed into the Anna Creek lease, with the remaining larger lease acquired by Western Mining Corporation.

== See also ==
- List of ranches and stations
- List of the largest stations in Australia
