= Outback (region) =

Local government region of South Australia

Coordinates: 29°S 137°E

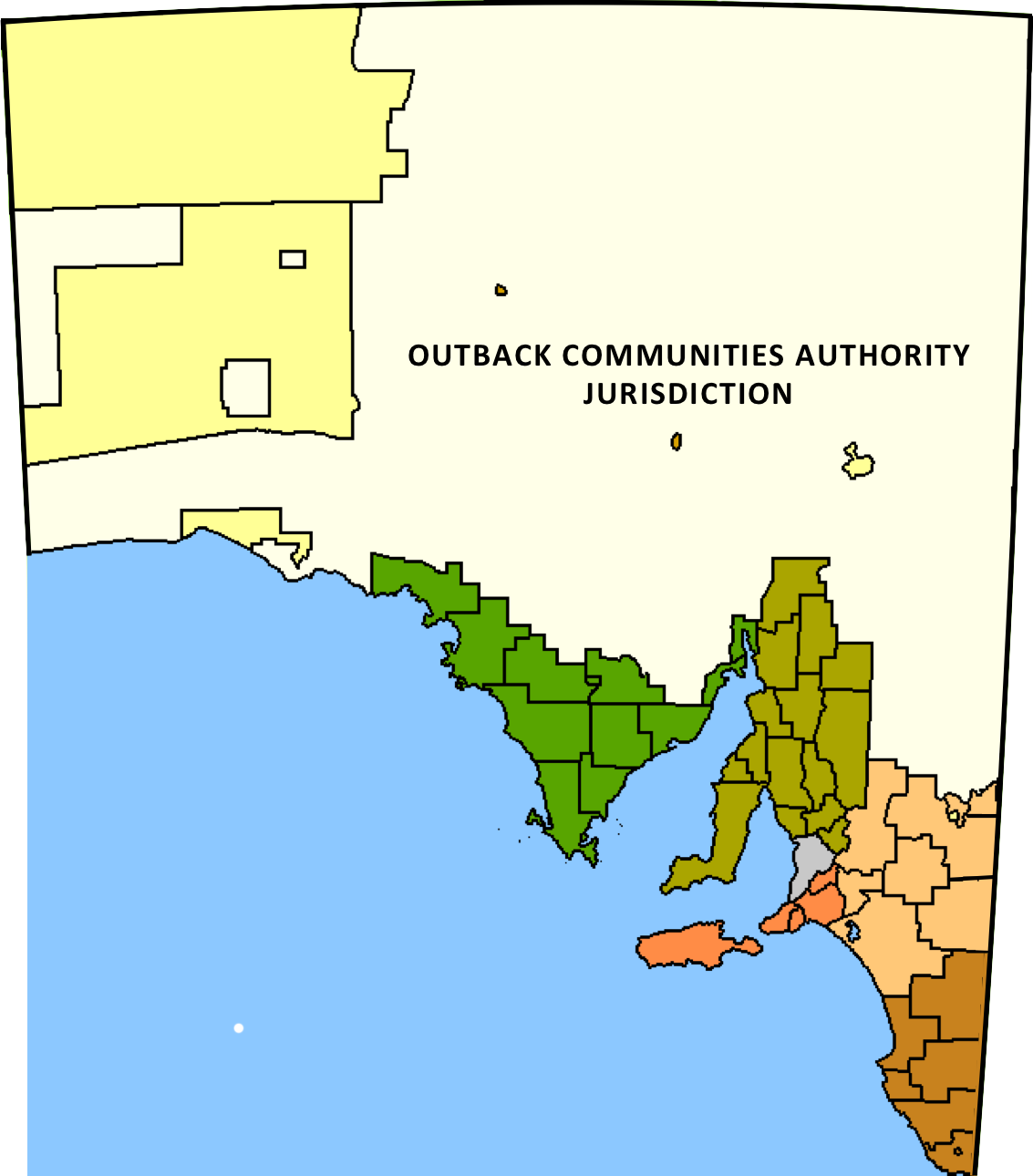

The Outback Region is one of seven regions used by the Local Government Association of South Australia to describe the territories used by its regional groupings of local government areas.

== Geography ==
It is by far the largest region, with very nearly 80 percent of the land area of South Australia, but less than one percent of its population, making it simultaneously by far the least populated and the least densely populated of all seven regions. The region encompasses all areas north and west of the more densely populated southeastern part of the state, all the way to its northern border with the Northern Territory (26th parallel south) and to its western border with Western Australia (129th meridian east). It also borders with Queensland in the northeast, and with New South Wales in the east (141st meridian east).

The Outback Region has a population of 12,496 (as of census of 2006, on an area of 834,679.8, which makes for a population density of 0.015 per km². The largest town is the mining town Roxby Downs (pop. 4055). In total, there are some 60 settlements and communities, including aboriginal communities.

Four of the five aboriginal councils of South Australia fall within the boundaries of the Outback Region. They are listed with the Local Government Areas below. Only Gerard (Aboriginal Council) falls within Murray Mallee region, which is southeast of the Outback Region.

== Largest towns ==
The largest towns of the Outback Region, with their 2006 census population figures which account for more than 70 percent of the Outback Region's population:

Town	Type	Population (Census 2006)	founded	Local Government Area
Roxby Downs	mining town	4055	1988	Roxby Downs
Coober Pedy	opal mining town	1916	1915	Coober Pedy
Leigh Creek	coal mining town	548	1888	Outback Areas Community Development Trust
Andamooka	opal mining town	528	1920s	Outback Areas Community Development Trust
Indulkana	aboriginal community	339		Anangu Pitjantjatjara Yankunytjatjara
Pukatja (Ernabella)	aboriginal community	332	1938	Anangu Pitjantjatjara Yankunytjatjara
Amata	aboriginal community	319	1961	Anangu Pitjantjatjara Yankunytjatjara
Mimili	aboriginal community	303	1972	Anangu Pitjantjatjara Yankunytjatjara
Woomera	military facility	295	1947	Outback Areas Community Development Trust
Oodnadatta	cattle station	277	1890	Outback Areas Community Development Trust

== Local government areas ==
On the local government level, the Outback Region is composed of seven units, with a wide range in area from 76 to 624,339 km²:

Local Government Area	Type	Major Town	Land Area (km²)	Pop. 2006	Density km^{−2}	Towns	Est.
Roxby Downs	Municipal Council	Roxby Downs	110	4292	39,018	2	1982
Coober Pedy	District Council	Coober Pedy	77,8	1996	25,656	1	1987
Anangu Pitjantjatjara Yankunytjatjara	Aboriginal Council	Umuwa	102650	2204	0,021	18	1981
Maralinga Tjarutja^{1)}	Aboriginal Council	Oak Valley	102863,6	105	0,001	1	1984
Yalata	Aboriginal Council	Yalata	4563	100	0,022	1	1994
Nepabunna	Aboriginal Council	Nepabunna, South Australia	76,4	49	0,641	1	1998
Outback Communities Authority	Unincorporated Area	Leigh Creek	624339.0	3750	0,006	36	1978
Outback	LGA Region	Roxby Downs	834679,8	12496	0,015	60	
^{1)}including Mamungari Conservation Park and Emu Field, excluding Maralinga
