= Parakylia =

Pastoral lease in South Australia

Coordinates: 30.4046°S 136.3876°E

Location in South Australia

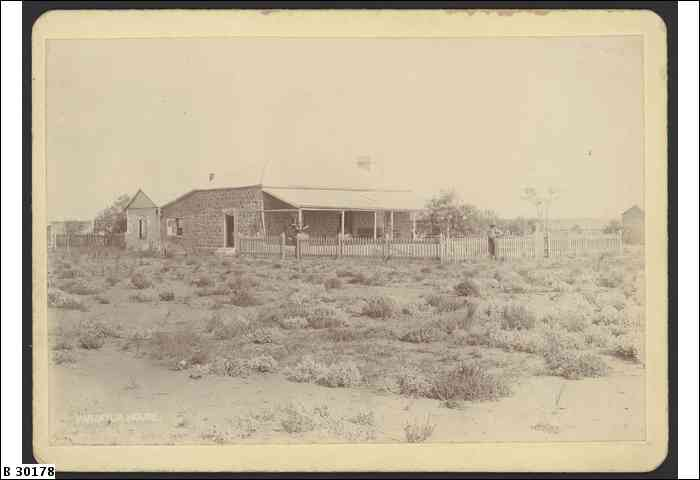
View of Parakylia Station north of Andamooka ca.1892

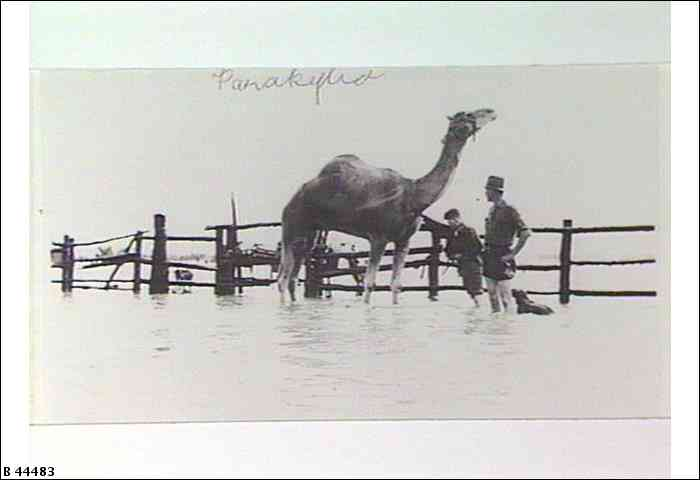
Flood at Parakylia ca. 1942

Parakylia Station is a pastoral lease that once operated as a sheep station but now operates as a cattle station in outback South Australia.

== Description ==
It is located approximately 52 kilometres (32 mi) west of Roxby Downs and 166 kilometres (103 mi) south of William Creek. The property shares boundaries with Mount Eba, Billa Kalina and Millers Creek Stations to the north, Mount Vivian to the west and Roxby Downs Station to the south and east. It is also situated within the Woomera Rocket Range, and the Dingo Fence passes through the property.

The country is composed of open tablelands vegetated with saltbush, cottonbush, myall, mulga and sandalwood. The area is interspersed with sand ridges, but has several ephemeral creeks and some swamp areas that hold some surface water.

== History ==
The name of the property is a corruption of the traditional owners' word parakilia, which is used to describe the succulent annual portulacaceous plants of the genus Calandrinia that are found in the area.

The station was established at some time prior to 1880; in this year it was placed on the market and was stocked with 30,000 sheep. Occupying an area of 2,120 square miles (5,491 km^{2}), the run adjoined Mount Eba, Arcoona and Andamooka Stations.

By 1884 the 2,257-square-mile (5,846 km^{2}) property was stocked with 15,000 sheep, 800 cattle, 100 horses and had purchased 40 camels for the transportation of supplies.

The property was initially established by Andrew Wooldridge, who obtained the lease for a vast tract of land including Parakylia and Arcoona Stations. In 1880 the property was stocked with 30,000 sheep and occupied an area of 2,120 square miles (5,491 km^{2}), and was sold to Thomas and Charles Chewings. Charles William Bowman joined the partnership late then Charles Chewings retired from the enterprise in 1882. A post office was situated on the station between 1884 and 1898. Shearing in 1894 expected between 35,000 and 50,000 sheep to be shorn. By 1899 the run was abandoned after problems with dingos attacking stock. By 1901 the lease was still unlet but under a caretaker; the property encompassed an area of 1,520 square miles (3,937 km^{2}). Good rains fell later that year and there was plenty of feed available, stock was reintroduced and the next year shearing recommenced.

By 1908 the property occupied an area of approximately 1,500 square miles (3,885 km^{2}) and was stocked with 10,000 sheep.

F and M Collins owned Parakylia in 1912 and were selling both wool and bullocks to local markets. By 1915 the 1,417-square-mile (3,670 km^{2}) property was unoccupied again and open for application. The property was on the market in 1923, when it was owned by Joseph Timms, at which time it had an area of 1,314 square miles (3,403 km^{2}). It had been subdivided into 23 paddocks and was enclosed by a mix of five- and six-wire fences, but was passed in at £10,760. Parakylia Pty. Ltd. was formed in 1927 to acquire the property. The company was established with £60,000 capital.

In 1954 the executors of the trustees advertised for a manager to run Parakylia, which was stocked with 14,000 sheep.

The land occupying the extent of the Parakylia pastoral lease was gazetted by the Government of South Australia as a locality in April 2013 under the name "Parakylia".

== See also ==
- List of ranches and stations
