= 1999 World Solar Challenge =

Trans-Australian car race

- The 5th edition of the World Solar Challenge
- Host Country: Australia
- Dates run: 17–26 October 1999
- Start: Darwin, Australia
- Finish: Adelaide, Australia
- Race Distance (km): 2998.7
- Total Distance (km): 3,028

Results
- Winner: (Australia) Aurora Solar Car Team
- 2nd: (Canada) Queens University
- 3rd: (Australia) University of Queensland

The 1999 World Solar Challenge was one of a biennial series of solar-powered car races, covering about 3,000 km (1,900 mi) through the Australian Outback, from Darwin, Northern Territory to Adelaide, South Australia.

There were 40 entrants in the event, 28 of which completed the course. The overall winner was Aurora 101, built by the Aurora Solar Car Team of Australia at an average speed of 72.96 km/h. It is the only edition of the race to be won outright by an Australian team.

== Route ==
The World Solar Challenge runs across approximately 3,000 km from Darwin, the capital of the Northern Territory, to Adelaide, the capital of South Australia.

Control points are established along the route for driver changes and public viewing opportunities. In 1999, these included Katherine, Dunmarra, Tennant Creek, Alice Springs, Cadney Park Homestead, Glendambo, Port Augusta and Angle Vale.

== Results ==
The Aurora Solar Car Team from Melbourne, Australia won the event outright.

Rank	Team	Car	Country	Class	Time (hr:mn)	Speed (km/h)
1	Aurora	Aurora 101	Australia		41:06	72:96
2	Queens University	Radiance	Canada		41:33	72.12
3	University of Queensland	SunShark	Australia		41:50	71.86
4	Northern Territory University	Desert Rose	Australia	Silver Zinc	42:14	71.00
5	Kanazawa Institute of Technology	KIT Golden Eagle	Japan	Silver Zinc	44:33	67.31
6	Tamagawa Solar Challengers	Tamagawa Super Genbow	Japan	Silver Zinc	45:26	66.00
7	Lake Tuggeranong College	Spirit of Canberra	Australia		45:31	65.86
8	Massachusetts Institute of Technology	Manta GTX	USA	Cutout	45:34	65.81
9	University of Michigan	Maize Blaze	Japan		47:34	63.04
10	Osaka Sangyo University	OSU Model S	Australia		48:21	62.02

Separate classes were convened based on the solar cell material used by teams.

=== Silver Zinc class ===
Class	Overall	Team	Car	Country	Time (hr:mn)	Speed (km/h)
1	4	Northern Territory University	Desert Rose	Australia	42:14	71.00
2	5	Kanazawa Institute of Technology	KIT Golden Eagle	Japan	44:33	67.31
3	6	Tamagawa Solar Challengers	Tamagawa Super Genbow	Japan	45:26	66.00

=== Silicon class ===
Class	Overall	Team	Car	Country	Time (hr:mn)	Speed (km/h)
1	14	SA Solar Car Consortium	NED	Australia	55:13	54.31
2	20	Southbank University	Mad Dog III	UK	59:11	50.67
3	21	Central Queensland University	Capricorn Solar Flair	Australia	60:27	49.61

=== Cutout class ===
Class	Overall	Team	Car	Country	Time (hr:mn)	Speed (km/h)
1	8	MIT	NED	Australia	45:34	65.81
2	20	Aoyama Gakuin University	AGU Aglaia	Japan	58:21	51.39
3	21	University Missouri Rolla		USA	63:27	47.26

=== Private class ===
Class	Overall	Team	Car	Country	Time (hr:mn)	Speed (km/h)
1	11	Solar Motions	Cascade Cruiser	USA	48:21	62.02
2	15	Jona Sun	Jona Sun	Japan	55:45	53.79
3	17	Junkyard	Junkyard	Japan	56:54	53.79

== Cycle challenge ==
The Electricity Trust of South Australia sponsored a solar-powered cycle challenge over approximately 1,500 km from Alice Springs to Adelaide.
