= Gibber Gabber =

Australian newspaper

Gibber Gabber was a weekly newspaper published in Woomera, South Australia; it had been published continuously by the Woomera Board since August 1950 but ceased print publication on 31 December 2014.

== History ==
Gibber Gabber began as a local community magazine (or newsletter) for Woomera residents, with the first issue on 11 August 1950. It is published weekly on Fridays by the Woomera Board, whose aim is to build the sense of community, given its remote location. The newspaper's main office is on Banool Avenue, Woomera.

Local themes covered by the newspaper include:

- The Woomera community
- Indigenous Australia, health and the environment
- Border protection - such as Woomera Immigration Reception and Processing Centre
- Rail transport - national, as well as Central Australia Railway, Northern Australian Railway, and the Trans-Australian Railway
- Space technology and the space race - e.g. Defence Science and Technology Group and the RAAF Woomera Range Complex
- Nurrungar and satellite tracking stations - Joint Defense Facility Nurrungar
- The Cold War - local atomic bomb testing at Maralinga
- Science fiction from the Cold War era - including reports of unidentified flying objects

== Distribution ==
The newspaper was distributed both in print form and also online.

== Digitisation ==
Microform versions of the newspaper from January 1991 are available from the State Library of South Australia and Australian National Library. Some more recent issues are also available at Issuu.
