= 2006 South Australian local elections =

- 23 October−10 November 2006
- Registered: 1,155,695
- Turnout: 378,130 (▼1.08%)

	First party	Second party	Third party
	IND
Leader	N/A	N/A	N/A
Party	Independents	Labor	Liberal
	Fourth party	Fifth party
		AFP
Leader	No leader	Bruce Preece
Party	Greens	Australia First
Last election		Did not contest
Seats before		0
Seats won		1
Seat change		▲1
Popular vote		341

The 2006 South Australian local elections were held in November 2006 to elect the councils of 66 of the 68 local government areas (LGAs) in South Australia. Many councils also held mayoral elections.

As per usual, no election was held in Roxby Council as it is served by an administrator who performs all the functions of a council. The election in Adelaide was delayed until November 2007 to enable a review of its representation system.

At the close of nominations on 19 September, a total of 1,094 candidates had nominated for mayoral or councillor positions. 56 elections were uncontested.

Two elections were declared 'failed', each because of the withdrawal of a candidate for medical reasons − Kensington Ward in Norwood Payneham & St Peters and Eastwood & Glenunga Ward in Burnside.

The Australia First Party had their first local elections victory, with Bruce Preece elected in Prospect. However, he resigned from the party five days after being elected.

== Results ==
=== Council elections ===
Party	Votes	%	Swing	Seats	Change
Independents					
Labor					
Liberal					
Greens					
Australia First	341			1	▲1
Total	378,130	100.00			
Registered voters / turnout	1,155,695	31.62	−1.08		

== Aftermath ==
Following the elections, 37% of voters stated that political advertising received from 230 candidates influenced how they voted.
