= Rook (rocket) =

Rook is the name of a British rocket. Twenty five Rook rockets were launched between 1959 and 1972. The launches took place from Aberporth in Wales and from Woomera in South Australia. Designed to endure the 40G acceleration it generated during operation, the Rook motor served as the first stage for the Leopard and Jaguar (Jabiru) supersonic test vehicles and was also used independently in single-stage test flights.

The Rook measured 0.43 meters in diameter and 5.28 meters in length. It featured a case-bonded charge containing 846 kg of non-aluminized plastic propellant, delivering a total impulse of 1,760 kN-seconds with a burn time of 5.6 seconds. It produced a thrust of 323 kN and had a specific impulse of 213 seconds. It had a maximum flight altitude of 20 kilometres and a launch mass of 1.2 tons.

It had the following configurations:

- Rook - used as first stage on the Leopard, and as a single stage rocket
- Rook II - used as first stage on the Jaguar (Jabiru)
- Rook IIIA - used as first stage on the Jaguar 2 and 3, and as a single stage rocket
- Rook IIIB - used as second stage on the Jaguar 3
