= RAAF Base Woomera =

Royal Australian Air Force airbase in South Australia

- RAAF Woomera Airfield
- Part of RAAF Woomera Range Complex
- Near Woomera, South Australia in Australia

Site information
- Type: Military air base
- Owner: Department of Defence
- Operator: Royal Australian Air Force
- Website: Woomera Range Complex

Location
- Location of the base in South Australia
- Coordinates: 31°08′39″S 136°49′01″E

Site history
- Built: 1947
- In use: 1 January 2015 – present (as RAAF Base Woomera)

Airfield information
- Identifiers: IATA: UMR, ICAO: YPWR
- Elevation: 167 metres (548 ft) AMSL
Runways
Direction	Length and surface
12/30	1,614 metres (5,295 ft) Gravel
18/36	2,372 metres (7,782 ft) Asphalt
- Sources: Australian AIP and aerodrome chart

RAAF Base Woomera (WMA) is a Royal Australian Air Force (RAAF) military airbase located in the Woomera Prohibited Area in outback South Australia. It was proclaimed by a Chief of Air Force Directive in January 2015. RAAF Base Woomera and the RAAF Woomera Test Range (WTR) are the two formations which make up the RAAF Woomera Range Complex (WRC). RAAF Base Woomera consists of two sectors; 'Base Sector North', which is a restricted access area and includes Camp Rapier, the entrance to the Woomera Test Range and the RAAF Woomera Airfield (IATA: UMR, ICAO: YPWR). 'Base Sector South' is accessible by the public and essentially encompasses that part of RAAF Base Woomera long referred to as Woomera Village. Woomera Village is often quoted as a 'remote town'. It is not a 'town', but rather an 'open base' of the RAAF. The 'village' has previously always functioned as an Australian Government/Defence Force garrison facility until it was fully incorporated into RAAF Base Woomera in 2015.

== Operations ==
RAAF Base Woomera is an operational Royal Australian Air Force (RAAF) military airbase located within the 122,188-square-kilometre (47,177 sq mi) RAAF Woomera Range Complex, situated approximately 3 nautical miles (5.6 km; 3.5 mi) north of the base's "village" area, in South Australia, Australia. Officially established as an airbase with effect from January 2015, the RAAF Base Woomera comprises the Woomera airfield, hangars and technical areas as well as the Woomera Village.

Operations and capability management of the entire Woomera Range Complex, is vested to Commander, Air Warfare Centre (CDR AWC), located at RAAF Base Edinburgh (Edinburgh, South Australia). Operational management of the RAAF Base Woomera formation is the joint responsibility of Air Force Test Ranges and the Defence Estate and Infracture Group (E&IG), supported by a Defence Contractor (as of March 2023 Broadspectrum). The role of the base is to provide operational and garrison support to Defence activities within the WRC. The RAAF Woomera Test Range formation of the Woomera Range Complex is managed by the AWC's Air Force Ranges Directorate (AFRD). The Air Force Test Ranges Squadron (AFTR SQN), is based out of RAAF Edinburgh, but they also maintain a permanent detachment based out of RAAF Base Woomera. The role of AFTR SQN is the day-to-day operation and management the WRC.

RAAF Base Woomera is located approximately 450 km (280 mi) north of RAAF Base Edinburgh near Adelaide). The Woomera Range Complex (WRC) is used as a specialised Defence systems test range supporting the defence of Australia. The Air Force, Department of Defence, and some State and Federal Government agencies (education, police etc.) maintain a number of full-time personnel at the base to support Defence activities at the WRC. The 2015 range proclamation states that the range may only be used for Defence related activities and that Defence access to, and use of the WRC will be managed through Headquarters, Air Warfare Centre at RAAF Base Edinburgh. Requests for Non-defence access to, and use (e.g. mining) of, the Woomera Prohibited Area (WPA), which is essentially the ground area that delineates the Woomera Range Complex, is managed through the 'Woomera Prohibited Area Coordination Office' (WPACO) in Canberra. Note: Aeronautical access requirements for RAAF Woomera aerodrome can be found in the 'En Route Supplement Australia' (ERSA). The entry for Woomera states that landing approval is coordinated through the Air Base Command Post, but that civilian aircraft are not normally given permission to use the airfield unless such use is related to Defence activities at Woomera.

RAAF Woomera is able to operate all current types of aircraft used by the Australian Defence Force (ADF), including C-17A Globemasters and all fast jet types. The airfield can be fitted with an arrestor cable system when required to bring it to normal RAAF operating standards for F/A-18 Hornet operations. The airfield is also well able to handle larger aircraft types such as the C-5 Galaxy and Boeing 747. Large aircraft movements occur often at Woomera in support of ADF test and evaluation activities on the complex.

== Historical ==
The centre line of the airfield was surveyed by Len Beadell in early 1947. A RAF Dakota was the first aircraft to use the field, as it landed at Woomera on 19 June 1947. It brought General Evetts and a party of British scientists to inspect the airfield which was recently completed. During 2015, all of the Woomera aerodrome aircraft parking aprons (4), taxiways and the main runway, were all refurbished in $40M upgrade. In 2016, through public tender, a significant repair was made to Hangar 1, and in 2018 the air movements terminal was refurbished and a new secure-storage facility built. A new connecting road between the magazine area (west of the airfield) and the northern end of the main runway was constructed. The construction of a new security control gate facility was completed in the later months of 2018, approximately 1 km north of Woomera Village, at the entrance to Base Sector North of RAAF Base Woomera.

The first control tower at the Woomera Test Range originally came from RAAF Base Uranquinty, New South Wales. The tower was disassembled by No. 2 Airfield Construction Squadron in the late 1940s and shipped to Woomera, where it was re-erected and reopened in the early 1950s at Evetts Field. The main control tower at Woomera aerodrome was constructed in 1953 and is still active. In 2016 the Department of Defence announced plans to replace the control cabin and an upgrade to all communications, electrical, mechanical and hydraulic services to the building in order to comply with building code requirements.

=== Evetts Field ===
Evetts Field (AU09) is a satellite airfield located 40 kilometres (25 mi) north-west of the RAAF Base Woomera within the RAAF Woomera Range Complex. On 15 May 1951 Koolymilka airfield was officially named Evetts Field in honour of Lieutenant General John Fullerton Evetts, who led the English party that selected the Woomera site for the Anglo-Australian Long Range Weapons Establishment, and handed over to the Department of Supply. Evetts Field is now only semi operational, mostly used as an emergency runway for the Royal Flying Doctor Service and for RAAF operations. It features two runways, each 2,028 metres (6,654 ft) long. Evetts Field was used for launching the Jindivik target drone from 31 October 1950 to June 1975. The airfield was virtually abandoned in the 1970s, with its control tower and other buildings sold off and removed. The two runways are now in poor condition.

== See also ==
- List of Royal Australian Air Force installations
- List of airports in South Australia
