= Jaguar (British rocket) =

The Jaguar (also called Jabiru) was a three-stage British sounding rocket built in several versions.

The first stage of the Jabiru Mk.1 was 5.6 m long and had a takeoff weight of 1,170 kilograms, of which about 866 kilograms were fuel, being powered by a Rook II engine. The second stage weighed 292 kilograms, of which 184 kilograms were allotted to fuel, and was powered by a Gosling II engine. The third stage contained 26 kilograms of fuel and was powered by a Lobster I engine. In all stages solid fuel was used. The complete rocket was 12 meters long. The Jabiru Mk.1 was launched several times between 1960 and 1964 at the aerospace testing area at Woomera, South Australia.

The follow-up version, the Jabiru Mk.2, contained an improved starting stage (Rook IIIA) and a second stage (Goldfinch II) with 307 kilograms of fuel as well as a third stage (Gosling IV) with 190 kilograms fuel. The Jabiru Mk.2 was launched ten times at Woomera between 1964 and 1970.

This rocket was replaced by the Jabiru Mk.3 which used a modified first stage of the Jabiru Mk.2 as second stage (Rook IIIB), while the first stage remained unchanged (Rook IIIA), with no third stage being used. The Jabiru Mk.3 was used for re-entry experiments between 1971 and 1974.

== Versions ==
The Jaguar / Jabiru had several configurations:

| Version | Year | 1st stage | 2nd stage | 3rd stage |
|---|---|---|---|---|
| Jabiru Mk.1 | 1960 | Rook II | Gosling II | Lobster I |
| Jabiru Mk.2 | 1964 | Rook IIIA | Goldfinch II | Gosling IV |
| Jabiru Mk.3 | 1973 | Rook IIIA | Rook IIIB | - |
