= Arcoona =

Coordinates: 31.02713°S 137.04789°E

Location in South Australia

Arcoona or Arcoona Station is a pastoral lease that operates as a sheep station.

It is located about 28 kilometres (17 mi) north east of Woomera in the outback of South Australia,

The station occupies an area of 828 square miles (2,145 km^{2}). The station was founded prior to 1880 and was owned by Mr A. M. Wooldridge in 1880. Wooldridge owned the Parakylia lease that he had established and then sold the western portion and kept the balance himself and renamed as Arcoona. The neighbouring properties are Wirraminna to the south and Andamooka Station to the north.

== History ==
The pastoralist James Gemmell who had been managing Mundi Mundi Station left to take over Arcoona in 1893.

The horse Discussion by Light Artillery from Small Talk was bought in 1906 and sent to Arcoona to stud. Richardson paid 190 guineas for the sire.

It was sold in 1909 by Messrs. Richardson and Gemmell to John Pick of Terowie, who would be elected to the House of Assembly while at Arcoona. At the time the station was stocked with 12,000 sheep, 600 cattle, 250 horses and 7 camels.

Although Arcoona has an arid climate it is occasionally inundated with rain, in 1919 Mr J. H. Mules reported 3 inches (76 mm) of rain falling and the lake filling fast, and again on New Year's Day in 1921 4 inches (102 mm) of rain fell.

Pick sold Arcoona in 1920 and bought Coondambo Station in May 1920 for £37,200.

The station was restocked in 1930 with 2,000 ewes being delivered from the Matakanna district.

Following a great season in 1938 the percentage of lambing was excellent with 6,637 lambs produced from 6,977 ewes.

The 1942 season was fairly dry but some patchy rains provided enough feed for the sheep to graze on but not enough to fill any surface tanks. At this time the station was owned by Arcoona Pastoral Co. of which Mr. R. J. McEwin was a partner.

During the drought of 1944–1945 stock numbers were very low.

The station was sold once again in 1947, for an undisclosed price believed to be in excess of £75,000 on account of J. E. Pick to Kidman Estates of Adelaide. At the time the area of the property was 1,490 square miles (3,859 km^{2}) and had an estimated flock of 25,000 sheep. The station had also received heavier than normal rainfall over the last year and all the creeks were flowing and lakes were full to capacity.

In 2003 the station was selected by the then federal Science Minister, Peter McGauran, as a low level nuclear waste dump. The site was chosen as it had better security, a less environmentally sensitive access route and more saline water which has no pastoral use. About 40 cubic metres (1,400 ft^{3}) of radioactive waste generated each year in Australia would be stored in an underground repository. The plan was abandoned in 2004, following legal action from the then owners, the Polke family, as well as opposition from the state government and traditional owners.

In 2008 the property was acquired by the Handbury family who also owned Collinsville Station. The property occupied an area of 3,430 square kilometres (1,324 sq mi) and was managed by Andrew Willis. The property was running a flock of about 20,000 sheep as well as 100 shorthorn cattle.

The land occupying the extent of the Arcoona pastoral lease was gazetted by the Government of South Australia as a locality in April 2013 under the name 'Arcoona'.

== See also ==
- List of ranches and stations
