= Leopard (rocket) =

Leopard is the name of a British double stage experimental supersonic test rocket, which was launched between 1959 and 1962 eleven times from Aberporth. The Leopard has a flight altitude of 20 kilometres, a launch mass of 1.5 tons and a length of 6 metres. The 2 stage aerodynamic test vehicle consisted of one Rook solid rocket motor as the first stage, with an added Gosling solid rocket engine second stage as an evolution of the Rook vehicle capable of reaching higher velocities. The Gosling engine would go on to be used on missiles like the Thunderbird and the Bloodhound, while the Rook flew with until 1972 when it was decommissioned.
