= Andamooka Station =

Locality and former pastoral lease in South Australia

Coordinates: 30.4497°S 137.164°E

Location in South Australia

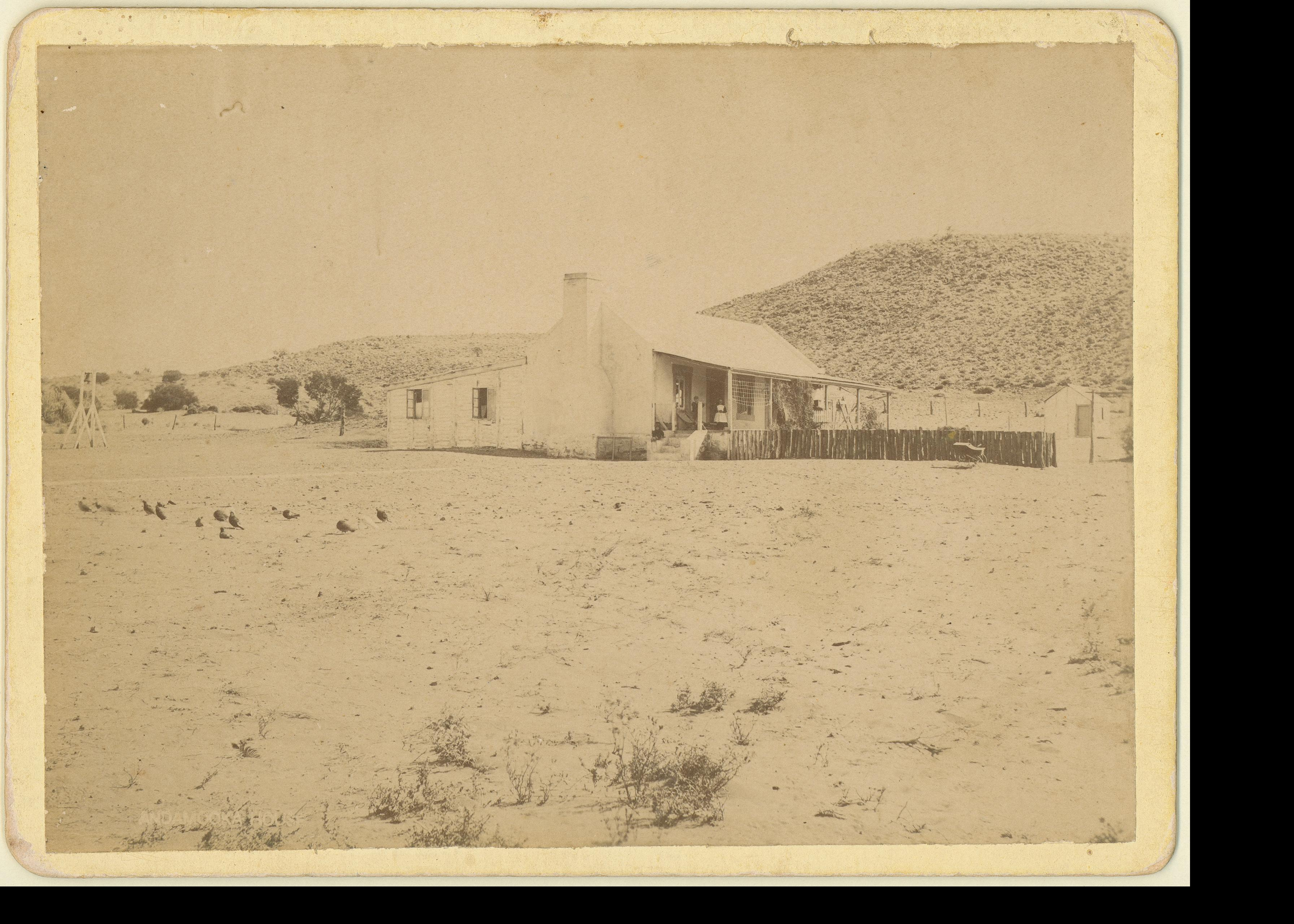
Andamooka Station homestead 1895

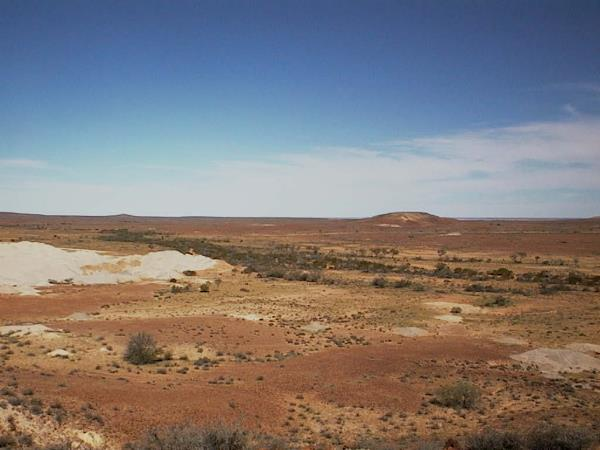
Country around Lake Torrens

Andamooka Station is a pastoral lease that once operated as a sheep station but now operates as a cattle station in outback South Australia.

== Description ==
It is located approximately 28 kilometres (17 mi) north east of Roxby Downs and 115 kilometres (71 mi) west of Lyndhurst. The station is bounded to the east by the ephemeral salt lake, Lake Torrens. It is bounded to the south by Arcoona Station and to the north by Stuart Creek and Mulgaria Station. Both Roxby Downs Station and Purple Downs abut the western boundary.

The landscape is composed mostly of Arcoona tablelands vegetated with saltbush and bluebush. It is currently stocked with cattle.

Currently the lease is held by BHP and occupies an area of 2,500 square kilometres (965 sq mi). BHP's Olympic Dam mine and processing plant is found in the north west of the station. The company also holds the lease for three other properties the surround the operations; Roxby Downs, Purple Downs and Stuart Creek Stations.

== History ==
The traditional owners of the area are the Kuyani people, an Aboriginal Australian people. The name "Andamooka" is a combination of two of words in the Kuyani language meaning "loaded bone" or "powerful bone", which is a reference to bone pointing as an act of retribution.

The first European to visit was John McDouall Stuart, who passed through the area in 1858 and made note of a waterhole in the area.

The station was established in 1872. In 1880 the property was owned by Messrs Bowman and Young and was running sheep. The men had sunk several wells and also acquired a 1,165 km^{2} (450 sq mi) block of land for £3.000 from M. Wooldridge of Arcoona Station to enlarge the run, which was stocked with 17,000 sheep and was having a shearing shed erected. By 1884 the 1,357-square-mile (3,515 km^{2}) property was stocked with 45,000 sheep, 900 cattle and 250 horses. It produced 480 bales of wool from the year's clip. In 1885 the station encompassed an area of 3,515 km^{2} (1,357 sq mi) and was stocked with 45,000 sheep, 200 cattle and 250 horses. The same year 680 bales of wool were produced. By 1893 the property was owned by Messrs Beaton and Young.

By 1901 the lease had been abandoned like many others in the area but left under a caretaker, the property encompassed an area of 1,240 square miles (3,212 km^{2}).

Opals were discovered on the property in 1930 by two drovers who saw the flashes of colour reflected from opals embedded in a hillside after a thunderstorm. The town site of Andamooka was established shortly afterwards.

In 1949 Andamooka occupied an area of 3,108 km^{2} (1,200 sq mi) and was managed by Lloyd Pollard. Dingos had become problematic in the area and were killing stock.

The area had good rains in 1984 with the lakes partially filled, some years of drought followed, but heavy rains arriving again in 2007 with 4 in (112 mm) of rain over two days and floodwaters coming within 20 metres (66 ft) of the homestead.

The land occupying the extent of the Andamooka Station pastoral lease was gazetted by the Government of South Australia as a locality in April 2013 under the name "Andamooka Station".

== See also ==
- List of ranches and stations
