= Collinsville Station =

Pastoral lease in South Australia

Coordinates: 33.328°S 139.146°E

Location in South Australia

Collinsville Station is a pastoral lease that operates as a sheep station in South Australia. The property is situated approximately 25 kilometres (16 mi) east of Hallett and 180 kilometres (112 mi) north of Adelaide. It is composed of flat and hilly terrain with areas of saltbush and mallee scrub along with bluebush plains.

Collinsville Station is best known as a Merino stud, and in the early 1980s under the control of Ron Collins, it was responsible for about one third of the genetics in the Australian Merino sheep flock.

The property was originally established by John Collins in 1889, and later named Collinsville and established as a sheep stud in 1895 with ewes from Koonoona. At his time the property occupied an area of 50,000 acres (20,234 ha).

The Handbury family had purchased the property in 1995 from receivers for A$7 million. Collinsville's properties grew 30% in size under the management of the Handburys. Following flooding in the creek in 2011 bones of diprotodon were found on the property. The fossils were taken to the South Australian Museum, who sent a team of scientists to the site where a full adult skeleton was found nearby.

The Handbury family put the station on the market to be auctioned in 2013, at which time the 56,903-hectare (140,610-acre) property was expected to fetch over A$5 million. It was to be sold without the flock of 5,000 sheep it was stocked with at the time, which were relocated to the Handbury's Arcoona property.

== See also ==
- List of ranches and stations
