= Collinsville, Georgia =

Unincorporated community in Georgia, U.S.

Coordinates: 33°42′08″N 84°05′19″W

Collinsville is an unincorporated community in DeKalb County, in the U.S. state of Georgia.

== History ==
The Georgia General Assembly incorporated the place in 1887 as the "Town of Collinsville". It is unknown why the name "Collinsville" was applied to this community.
