= RAAF Woomera Range Complex =

Aerospace facility in South Australia

- near Woomera, South Australia in Australia
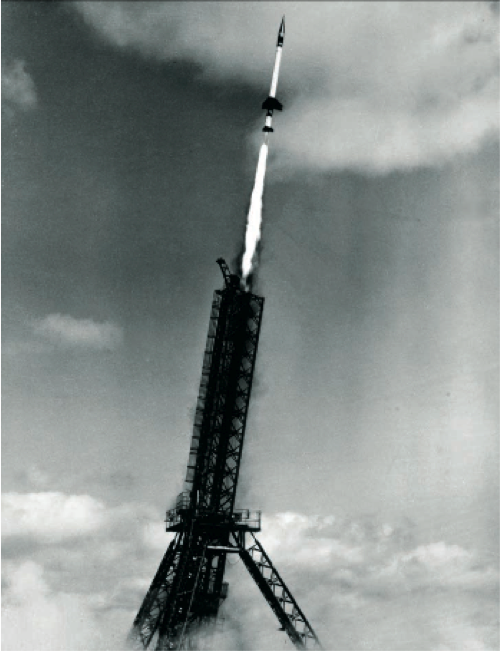
- Launch of a NASA Skylark sounding rocket from the Woomera Range Complex c. 1961

Site information
- Type: Military aerospace; Civil aerospace
- Owner: Government of South Australia under a crown lease to the Department of Defence
- Operator: Royal Australian Air Force
- Open to the public: Prohibited access except for Woomera Village and Stuart Highway
- Status: Active

Location
- Map of South Australia showing the land area covered by the RAAF Woomera Range Complex
- Coordinates: 30°57′19″S 136°31′56″E
- Area: 122,188 km^{2} (47,177 sq mi)

Site history
- In use: 1946 – present

Test information
- Nuclear tests: 9 (see British nuclear tests at Maralinga and Operation Totem)
- Other tests: Missiles, aircraft weapons, drone aircraft, rockets

The RAAF Woomera Range Complex (WRC) is a major Australian military and civil aerospace facility located in South Australia, approximately 450 km (280 mi) north-west of Adelaide. The WRC is operated by the Royal Australian Air Force (RAAF), a branch of the Australian Defence Force (ADF). The complex has a land area of 122,188 km^{2} (47,177 sq mi), roughly the size of North Korea or Pennsylvania. The airspace above the area is restricted and controlled by the RAAF for safety and security. The WRC is a highly specialised ADF test and evaluation site operated by the RAAF for the purposes of testing defence materiel.

The complex has been variously known as the Anglo-Australian Long Range Weapons Establishment, the Woomera Rocket Range, and the RAAF Woomera Test Range, before being reorganised and renamed as the RAAF Woomera Range Complex (WRC) in 2013. The ground area of the WRC is defined by the Woomera Prohibited Area (WPA) and includes the Nurrungar Test Area (NTA); with a land area of 122,188 km^{2} (47,177 sq mi), the WPA is described by the RAAF as the largest land-based test range in the western world. The Woomera Prohibited Area Coordination Office (WPACO) coordinates day-to-day operations of the complex, which comprises a mix of South Australian crown land covered by pastoral leases and mining tenements granted by the Government of South Australia. The Woomera Prohibited Area Advisory Board monitors the operations of the WPA and the WPACO. The airspace above the WPA is designated as the Woomera Restricted Airspace (WRX), and is controlled by the RAAF for safety and security reasons during the conduct of some activities on the complex, together with the support of Airservices Australia.

The complex also contains RAAF Base Woomera, or the RAAF Woomera Airfield, a dual-runway military airfield located 3 nmi (5.6 km; 3.5 mi) north of the settlement of Woomera Village. The airfield has been in military operation since a RAF Dakota landed at Woomera on 19 June 1947.

== Etymology and broad definitions ==
The word woomera is an Australian Aboriginal word of the Dharug language of the Eora people of the Sydney basin; a woomera is a wooden spear-throwing device. Woomera was adopted initially as an appropriate name for the settlement of Woomera, that is also called Woomera Village, based on a recommendation from Group Captain Alfred George Pither.

Since its establishment in 1947 and its renaming in 2016 as the RAAF Woomera Range Complex, the defence facilities have been variously known as the Anglo-Australian Long Range Weapons Establishment and then the Woomera Rocket Range between 1947 and 1980 when it was operated by the Australian Government as a Defence research and long range weapons testing range. Since 1980 the complex has had various other titles and in more recent years, the RAAF facility has mainly been known as the RAAF Woomera Test Range. In 2013, and as part of the ongoing redevelopment and remediation of Woomera into its 'next-generation' configuration in readiness to support the ADF's 'Force2030' plan, the range facility was reorganised and renamed to the RAAF Woomera Range Complex (WRC).

The ground area of the WRC is defined by the Woomera Prohibited Area (WPA) and includes the Nurrungar Test Area (NTA). The WPA covers an area of 122,188 km^{2} (47,177 sq mi) and is described by the RAAF as the largest land-based test range in the western world. The WPA is highly prospective and the Government of South Australia and Geoscience Australia have assessed that by 2025 about A$35 billion worth of iron ore, gold and other mineral resources are potentially exploitable from within the WPA. Access to the WPA for non-Defence use requires Commonwealth approval and is on the proviso that Defence activities will not be unduly compromised. The ground area of the WPA is bound generally by Woomera in the south-east, Roxby Downs and the village associated with the Olympic Dam mine in the east, William Creek in the north-east, Coober Pedy and further north to the 28th parallel, Maralinga in the south-west, and the Trans-Australian Railway and Tarcoola in the south. The WPA is divided into green, amber and red zones; representing infrequent, periodic, and frequent Defence use, respectively. Easements through the WPA allows public transit on the Tarcoola-Alice Springs railway, Stuart Highway, Lake Cadibarrawirracanna Road, Olympic Dam Highway (B97), William Creek Road, as well as the Woomera Village. Permits are required to use the Anne Beadell Highway. From time to time, and for safety reasons, Defence is able to close access for short periods along these easements during the conduct of tests carried out on the complex. The Woomera Prohibited Area Coordination Office (WPACO) coordinates daily operation of the complex, which comprises a mix of South Australian crown land and is covered by pastoral leases and mining tenements granted by the Government of South Australia. The Woomera Prohibited Area Advisory Board monitors the operations of the WPA and the WPACO and recommends amendments to co-existence policies and procedures; develop high-level relationships between Defence and the resources sector; resolve disputes between Defence and non-Defence users; report annually on the balance of interests in the WPA; and conduct a review every seven years of the balance of interests in the WPA. Its members comprise appointments from the Australian and South Australian governments.

The airspace above the WPA is an integral part of the WRC. Entry into Woomera Restricted Airspace (WRX) is controlled by the RAAF for safety and security reasons during the conduct of some activities on the complex. Airservices Australia defines the exact limits of restricted airspace in their annual handbook. When required, the RAAF issues a 'Notice to Airmen' (NOTAM) which effectively 'closes' access to any part of the WRX when safety or security needs require such action during the conduct of Defence activities at the complex.

== History ==
The groundspace of the complex is known as the Woomera Prohibited Area and measures 122,188 km^{2} (47,177 sq mi). It was first declared a prohibited area in 1947.

=== Military use ===
==== Anglo-Australian ====
Germany's use of V-1 flying bombs and V-2 rockets during World War II prompted the British to establish their own rocket testing programme. However, the density of population in the United Kingdom made testing risky, so the British turned to Australia, asking for a site with a long testing corridor containing minimal population. The two nations joined in the Anglo-Australian Joint Project, a Commonwealth weapons design and test program established in 1946. In April 1946 a mission from the United Kingdom led by Lieutenant-General JF Evetts CB CBE MC flew to Mt Eba homestead to carry out the first investigation for the suitability of the area for a guided missile range. His survey and mapping adviser was Colonel Lawrence Fitzgerald OBE, Director of Military Survey, Army Headquarters. There was little in the way of adequate surveys and maps of the area and in September 1946, soon after the project was approved by the Government, a survey and mapping reconnaissance of the area from Pimba north to the Musgrave Ranges was conducted by Major Lindsay Lockwood, Officer Commanding the Army's Australian Survey Corps Detachment 5th Field Survey Company based in Adelaide. In December 1946 the Secretary of the Department of the Army directed the Survey Corps' participation in the project. A Survey Corps detachment of ten personnel from the Adelaide unit set up a survey base camp at 'The Pines' near Pimba in March 1947, to commence a topographical mapping program which continued to 1953 when responsibility for surveys were transferred to the Department of the Interior. One member of the Survey Corps detachment which commenced work there in March 1947 was Sergeant Len Beadell. Australia was responsible for providing the testing facilities, personnel, and most of the funding, while the United Kingdom supplied most of the scientific equipment and personnel, and in addition to its financial contribution, paid for the weapons being used. At its peak, the complex had an area of 270,000 km^{2} (100,000 sq mi), most of which was in South Australia, but included a satellite range in north-west Western Australia. This was later scaled back to a total area of 127,000 km^{2} (49,000 sq mi); still the largest land-based weapons test complex in the western world.

Facilities at Salisbury supported the design and testing of many weapons and Upper Atmospheric Experiments trialled at Woomera. Weapons designed by the Joint Project and tested at Woomera include the Sea Wolf, Sea Slug, Rapier, Sea Dart, and Bloodhound surface-to-air missiles, the Black Knight research rocket, the Blue Steel nuclear stand-off missile, the Malkara anti-tank missile, the Ikara anti-submarine missile, and the GAF Jindivik target aircraft. Missile testing commenced in 1949. The Joint Project ran until 1980.

When the Anglo-Australian Joint Project began to wind down in the early 1970s, the village population began to rapidly drop from its peak of about 7000 residents in the mid-1960s. However, with the establishment of the USAF/ADF Joint Defence Communications Facility at the nearby Nurrungar site in 1969, approximately 18 km (11 mi) south of Woomera, along with its 1100 permanent staff, the village population stabilised at around 4,500 people (including around 800 children). In the late 1990s, as the Nurrungar program was winding down, the ADF reassessed the role of Woomera in its future force structure. What became apparent to the ADF at that time was that the Woomera Test Range was the only land-based test range left in the Western world capable of testing the next (or what is now termed '5th') generation of weapons systems within a fully instrumented, land-based, specialised test and evaluation range. This assessment was to redefine the future role and strategic importance of the Woomera Range Complex within Australia's long-term Defence requirements.

==== United States ====
Deep Space Station 41

During the early 1960s, the Woomera Range participated in the Mercury and Gemini space programs. Specialised tracking and communications stations were established at Red Lake approximately 50 km (31 mi) north of Woomera and at Mirikata about 200 km (120 mi) west of Woomera. These stations were important during the first Moon landing mission. One significant facility installed by the US was the highly specialised "Deep Space Station 41" (DSS-41). This facility was constructed at the edge of Island Lagoon about 25 km (16 mi) south of Woomera and was directly supported from the Woomera Defence Village. DSS-41 played a role in the 'race for space' from the mid-1950s to the mid-1970s, when the main tracking systems were dismantled and returned to the US. While none of the DSS-41 facility exists, the roadworks and building sites for this facility are still visible. In June 2022 Google Earth shows that a new facility has been constructed on the old DSS-41 site.

After the cancellation of the Joint Project, the complex was operated by Defence Research Centre Salisbury (former Weapons Research establishment, now Defence Science and Technology Group) in support of Australian Defence projects as they arose and also in support of German and NASA Sounding Rocket launches to observe the Supernova 1987A and other astronomical experiments. Woomera then focused on supporting the nearby joint Australia-United States Joint Defence Space Communications Station, Nurrungar. The surveillance facility closed in 1999.

==== Australian ====
During the 1990s it became apparent to the RAAF that Woomera was the only land-based test range left in the western world that was large enough for the testing of the generation of weapons systems that Australia was soon to acquire. Beginning with the instrumented range (Range E) in 1991, the RAAF has gradually taken over responsibility for the operation of the whole complex on behalf of the Department of Defence. In 2009, Joint Project 3024 was established to upgrade the range's instrumentation systems, and Project R7034 established to upgrade and modernise the required infrastructure. These projects have a 2020 ready point to coincide with the introduction of the Joint Strike Fighter (JSF).

Historically, for both Woomera and Australia, following the end of the Anglo-Australian Joint Project no further development occurred to make use of the technologies, skills and knowledge gained while the Project was operating. Australia became the fourth nation in the world to build and place in orbit a satellite from its own territory (WRESAT), that was the height, and end, of Australia's foray into space activities using its own purpose-built facility at Lake Hart (the ELDO site at Launch Area 6 of the Range). These launchers (there were two, and a third never completed) are now a relic of the Range's significant history of space-based activities. These two old launchers still tower over ten stories high over the inland Lake Hart dry salt lake, but are also a mute testament to Australia's once renowned position in space research and development. That former position, however, was recognised in 2007 with the unveiling of the American Institute of Aeronautics and Astronautics (AIAA) plaque commemorating Woomera's induction into the AIAA hall of fame, a distinction that placed Woomera's contribution to aerospace history and development on a par with Kitty Hawk (site of the first heavier than air controlled flight), and the Sea of Tranquility on the Moon (site of the first inter-planetary landing by humans). By 1999 the Defence Science and Technology Organisation and the RAAF's Aircraft Research and Development Unit identified the future potential for the complex, particularly as it was one of the few sites in the world where over-the-horizon weapons testing was feasible.

Prior to this review, the RAAF's Aircraft Research and Development Unit (ARDU), and in conjunction with the DSTO, had been continuing to utilise the former 'Range E' (instrumented) facility since 1991. In the mid-1990s, ARDU took over total management of the Range from the then DSTO but with the creation of Defence Estate, the administration of the Woomera Prohibited Area itself was handed back to Estate to manage, with RAAF only maintaining control over the defined Woomera Instrumented Test and Evaluation Range (formerly Range E and as the instrumented portion of the WPA was then known). Over the following ten years (1997–2007), the RAAF re-defined the purpose and operation of the range and, by 2007, Chief of Air Force had again assumed full command of the entire Woomera Test Range Complex (i.e. both the Range and the Base).

The RAAF Woomera Test Range (WTR) is the principal formation of the WRC and the primary operational reason for the existence of the Range Complex. Access to and use of the WRC is managed through Headquarters, Air Warfare Centre RAAF, with the AWC's Air Force Ranges Directorate (AFRD) responsible for assuring the overall capabilities of the Range. The day-to-day operation of the WTR element of the WRC is the responsibility of the Woomera Test Range Squadron (WTR SQN). In this role, the WTR SQN is also directly supported by Headquarters AWC; No. 20 Squadron RAAF; and Defence contractors permanently based at RAAF Base Woomera. In 2007, the Woomera Test Range was acknowledged by the American Institute of Aeronautics and Astronautics (AIAA) as a site of world aerospace historical significance.

In 2016 the Australian Government announced plans for an A$297-million remediation of the range and the upgrade of the measuring and monitoring and sensor systems at Woomera. Raytheon Australia was awarded the contract. The works are intended to accommodate performance tests of the F-35 Joint Strike Fighter and provide access for the United States military. Raytheon announced that the range would be challenged by the testing of "new remotely piloted air systems, evolved network centric warfare capabilities, and weapons fitted to the EA-18G Growlers and Joint Strike Fighters" after the upgrade.

The base was also used for testing of the Blue Streak missile system.

=== Other military uses ===
In 2013 testing began on Taranis, a drone aircraft which is the result of a joint project between UK defence and BAE Systems. In December 2009 there were up to ten different tests that occurred on the complex daily, and bookings for access had been made as far in advance as 2023. The increase in interest from other parties prompted the Australian government to mark $500 million in funding for Woomera in May 2009, to update tracking systems and other infrastructure. The complex is currently used for Australian Defence Force trials, and access is leased to foreign militaries and private companies for their own testing of weapons systems, rockets, and drone aircraft.

=== Civil aerospace use ===
The complex has also been used for rocketry. During the 1950s, the Black Knight rocket (as a component of Blue Streak) was tested at the range. The first rocket launch occurred in 1957, and continued until the last satellite launch, Prospero X-3 in 1971. Australia's first satellite, WRESAT, was launched from Woomera in 1967. The complex was awarded a National Engineering Landmark in 1999. Although initially allowed to lapse after the cancellation of the Joint Project, the use of the range for rocket research later increased. In 2002, the University of Queensland launched a rocket carrying the HyShot engine: the first successful flight of a hypersonic scramjet engine.

During the Cold War, Woomera had the second highest number and rate of rocket launches in the world after NASA's facilities at Cape Canaveral.

Between 1957 and 2007, over 518 launches from Woomera were recorded.

Other launches included:

- 1957 to 1987, 258 Skylark rockets were launched with various agencies including the UK, the European Space Agency and the German Aerospace Center
- In the 1970s, NASA launched 20 Aerobee series 150, 170, 200 and 200A rockets for experimental purposes.
- In 1995, NASA launched its last rocket from the range.
- On 9 July 2017 a Sonda rocket was launched on an Australian hypersonic mission, which impacted on the range.

Asteroid sampling spacecraft retrieval:

- In June 2010 and December 2020, the Japanese space probes Hayabusa and Hayabusa2 returned samples from asteroids 25143 Itokawa and 162173 Ryugu respectively by landing within the Woomera Prohibited Area.

=== Launch areas ===
Several launch areas have been used over the years:

- HAD - HAD launch complex
- LA1 - Sounding rocket launch complex
- LA2 - Sounding rocket launch complex (Stonechat, Skylark, Rook, Jaguar, Black Brant, Lorikeet, Long Tom, Kookaburra, HAD, Corella, Cockatoo, Aero High)
  - LA2 D - MORABA mobile launch complex
  - LA2 HRV - Hypersonic launch complex
  - LA2 N - Nike launch complex
  - LA2 SL - Skylark launch complex
- LA3
- LA4
- LA5A - Black Knight launch complex
- LA5B - Black Knight, Black Arrow launch complex
- LA6A - Europa, Blue Streak launch complex
- LA8 - Redstone, Aerobee launch complex
- LA9
- MRL - MRL launch complex

== Current uses ==
=== Baker Observatory ===
The Woomera Baker Observatory lies within the WPA. There is a public telescope which belongs to the Defence Department. Local volunteers assist RAAF Woomera in hosting stargazing observatory nights for the public and visiting military units. In March 2020, a new telescope was installed to replace the old one, which had been damaged five years earlier when its corrector plate had been accidentally cracked.

=== Other uses ===
In 2004, V8 Supercars team Team Dynamik were discovered to be conducting illegal vehicle testing at the Woomera site. The team claimed they were testing an aerodynamic enhancement device but were later fined AU$132,000 for breaching series' testing regulations.

In 2011 Federal Defence Minister Stephen Smith and Resources Minister Martin Ferguson, together with South Australian Premier Mike Rann, announced that large areas of the Woomera Protected Area would be opened up for mining. This followed years of negotiations for the "mixed use" of the area, which contains many billions of dollars of mineral resources.

Non-defence users of the area include pastoralists, Aboriginal people and traditional owners, mining and exploration companies with leases in the WPA (including Arrium and OZ Minerals), opal miners, tourists, research organisations and rail operator, One Rail Australia. Modern mines within the area include the Challenger gold mine, Peculiar Knob iron ore mine, Prominent Hill copper mine and the Cairn Hill iron ore mine. As of 2017, only Prominent Hill is operational. Peculiar Knob is in care and maintenance owing to a weak iron ore price, while ore bodies at Cairn Hill and Challenger have been exhausted.

== Management ==
=== Land area management and administration ===
Effective from 1 January 2015, the management of the Woomera Range Complex was reorganised under the new RAAF Air Warfare Centre (AWC). Operations management of the complex are managed through Headquarters Air Warfare Centre, while day-to-day operation of the range is the responsibility of the Woomera Test Range Squadron, which was expected to be renamed to a 'numbered' squadron during 2016. The Woomera Test Range Squadron is a sub-element of the Air Force Ranges Directorate (AFRD), which is also part of the Air Warfare Centre. Headquarters AWC, Air Force Ranges Directorate and the Test Range Squadron are all currently based at RAAF Base Edinburgh, in Adelaide, located approximately 450 km (280 mi) south-west of the complex. RAAF Base Woomera was formed in January 2015 by amalgamation of RAAF Woomera Airfield and the Woomera Village. No.20 (Woomera) Squadron was formed on 1 April 2015 to manage the operation of the aerodrome, while the Woomera 'village' element of RAAF Base Woomera essentially continues to operate as it has done since 1982. The Defence Estate & Infrastructure Group manage the operations of the village within the new RAAF Base Woomera structure, but the village remains open to the public as it has been since 1982. The Village remains totally owned and operated by Defence and exclusively supports the needs of Defence activities at the WRC.

Access is managed by the Department of Defence Woomera Prohibited Area Coordination Office using a permit system.

=== Security ===
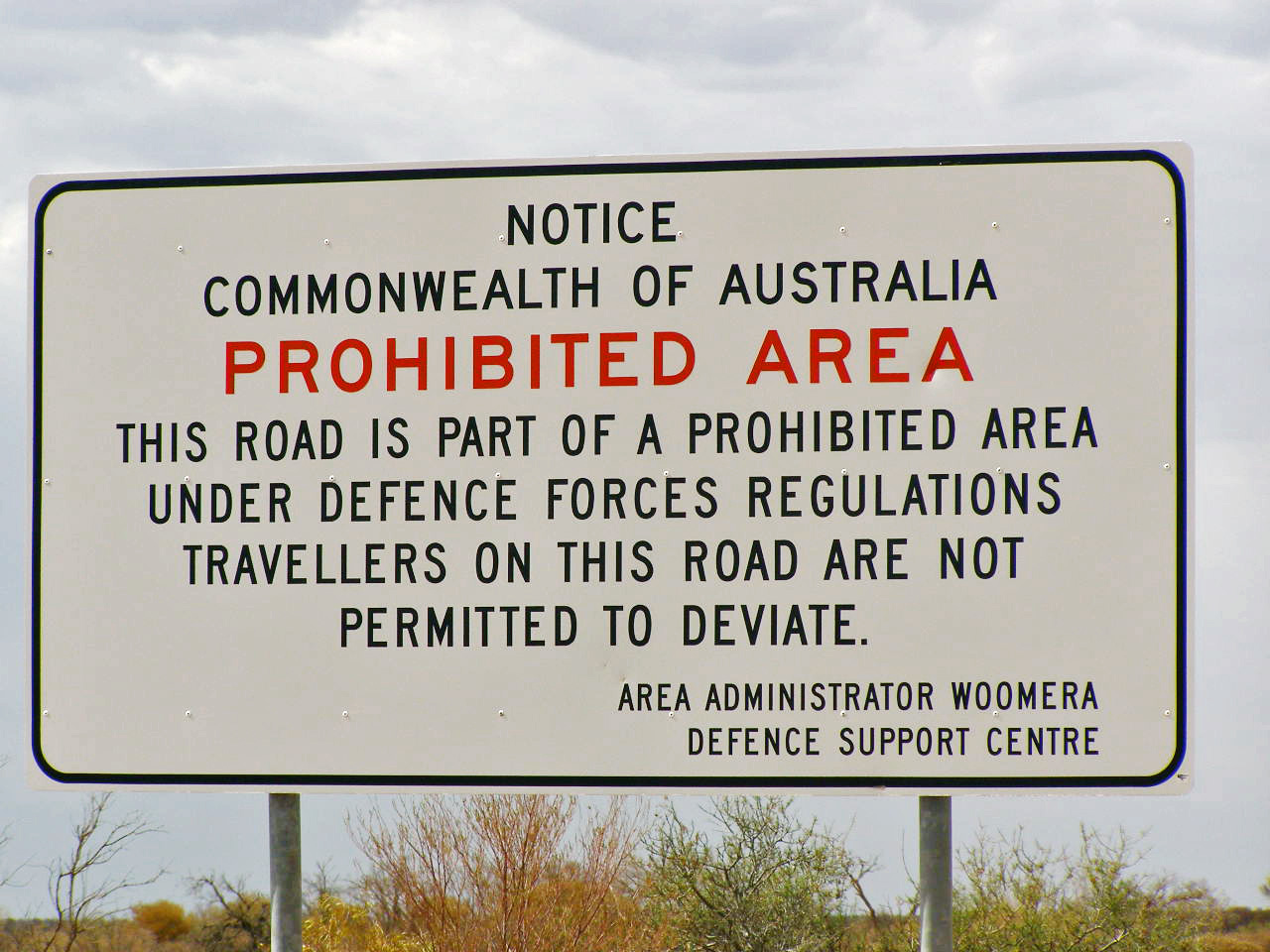
Warning sign on the Stuart Highway

There are a considerable number of warning signs across the range and on public access roads throughout the WPA warning travellers not to leave those routes without the permission of the Department of Defence. Since the beginning of 2012, the RAAF has also established, in conjunction with the South Australian Police, regular patrols of all roads and sites across the WPA to ensure public safety, particularly during periods when Range activities necessitate the closure of public access roadways and other easements (such at the main trunk railway line to Darwin).

=== RAAF Base Woomera ===
RAAF Base Woomera is co-managed, but as part of the wider WRC facility, by RAAF Combat Support Group (CSG) and the Defence Estate & Infrastructure Group (DEIG). CSG's role, delivered through Air Force Test Range Squadron (AFTR SQN), is to essentially operate the aerodrome precinct ('Base Sector North') element of the base in direct support of Defence activities at the WRC. DEIG's role with the WRC is two-fold; firstly DEIG is responsible for the operation of the 'village' support elements of the base (i.e. 'Base Sector South') such as messing, accommodation, security and other normal RAAF Base services and, secondly, DEIG are responsible for managing the wider Defence estate and infrastructure needs of the entire Range and Base complex. Consistent with the operation of all other RAAF Bases, DEIG manages a range of contractors to Defence to deliver the required services at Woomera.

=== Woomera Prohibited Area Advisory Board ===
The Woomera Prohibited Area Advisory Board monitors the operations of the Woomera Prohibited Area Coordination Office and meets semi-annually to recommend amendments to co-existence policies and procedures; develop high-level relationships between Defence and the resources sector; resolve disputes between Defence and non-Defence users; report annually on the balance of interests in the WPA; and conduct a review every seven years of the balance of interests in the WPA. As of 2017, the WPA Advisory Board membership included:

Name	Position	Relevant roles
The Hon. Amanda Vanstone	Chair	Former Liberal Senator for South Australia and Minister for Immigration and Multicultural Affairs
The Hon. Paul Holloway	Deputy Chair	Former Minister for Mines & Energy, Government of South Australia
Air Marshal Leo Davies AO, CSC		Chief of Air Force
Dr Paul Heithersay PSM		Deputy Chief Executive, Department of State Development, and CEO Olympic Dam Task Force, Government of South Australia
Andy Keough CSC		CEO Defence SA, Government of South Australia
Mark Lawson		Deputy Secretary, Department of Industry, Innovation and Science, Australian Government
Rebecca Skinner		Deputy Secretary, Department of Defence, Australian Government

Minutes of the Board from 2012 to 2016 were partially released following a Freedom of Information request in 2016.

== Aboriginal sites ==
Large areas within the Woomera Prohibited Area overlap with the native title determination of the Kokatha people, an Aboriginal Australian people of South Australia. The dunes and trees are considered sacred to the Kokatha people, being linked to their Tjukurpa (Dreaming) stories, in particular that of the Seven Sisters creation story. In particular, the black oak trees are relate to male Kokatha connections to this storyline.

In 2021, an anti-aircraft missile was found at Lake Hart West, a registered Aboriginal heritage site, about 50 km (31 mi) southeast of the trees, and this was not removed for about a year. Within the prohibited area, there is also a "red zone" which is used for the most intensive weapons testing and for which access permits are not generally issued, and this area is purported to be cleaned by the Department of Defence and the trees protected when testing is under way. However, a 2022 inspection by SBS News reporters and Kokatha representatives found that there were shell fragments of carbon fibre on the dunes around the site.

There are also a number of significant and rare archaeological sites which are remnants of previous Kokatha habitation within the weapons testing range, which are described in a 2020 heritage management plan prepared for the Department of Defence by GML Heritage Consultants. There are at least 14 separate stone foundations at Lake Hart North (which is not used by the department), which the archaeologists surmised were either "habitation structures" or "low-walled hunting hides".

At another location, Wild Dog Creek, there are a number of rock engravings in the Panaramitee Style (generally dated to the Pleistocene, 10,000 years ago), created by chipping away the rock with sharp tools. Other Aboriginal Australian rock art exists throughout the area, including at Lake Hart, portraying, among other things, footprints which match the Genyornis, a giant bird that went extinct thousands of years ago.

The report states that the location was likely "inhabited and used for many thousands of years", informally dated to up to 50,000 years ago (similar to human habitation in the nearby Flinders Ranges), and the sites could provide hitherto unknown cultural information about the Australian desert area.

== See also ==
- British nuclear tests at Maralinga
- Island Lagoon Tracking Station
- Joint Defence Facility Nurrungar
- Koonibba Test Range
- List of airports in South Australia
- List of Royal Australian Air Force installations
- Tallaringa Conservation Park
- Woomera Immigration Reception and Processing Centre
- Woomera Launch Area 5
