= Glendambo, South Australia =

Glendambo
- Town
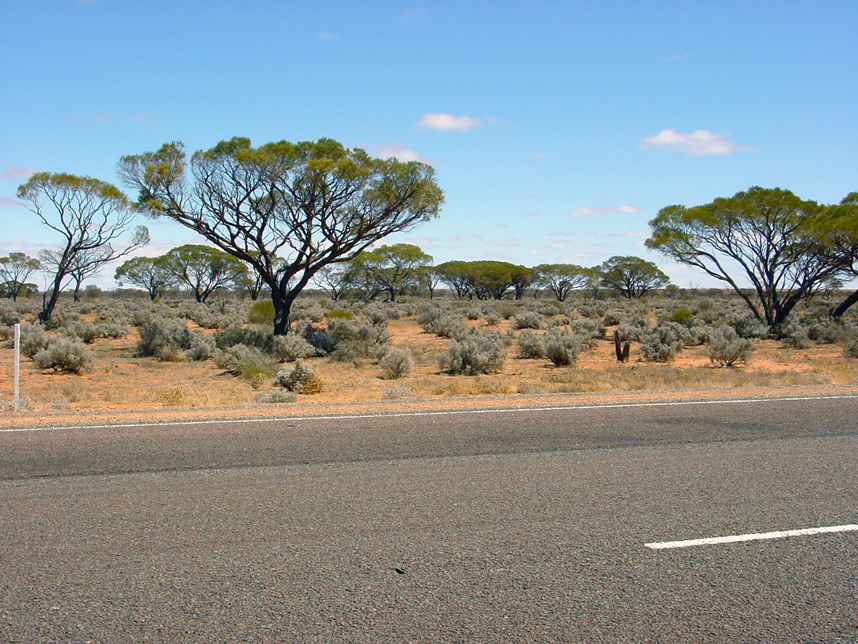

- Coordinates: 30°57′S 135°43′E
- Country: Australia
- State: South Australia
- Region: Far North
- LGA: Pastoral Unincorporated Area
- Location: 592 km (368 mi) N of Adelaide; 186 km (116 mi) N of Port Augusta; 254 km (158 mi) S of Coober Pedy
- Established: 13 May 1982 (town); 23 October 2003 (locality)

Government
  - State electorate: Giles
  - Federal division: Grey

Population
  - Total: 0 (SAL 2016)
- Postcode: 5719
- Mean max temp: 25.8 °C (78.4 °F)
- Mean min temp: 12.7 °C (54.9 °F)
- Annual rainfall: 182.2 mm (7.17 in)
Localities around Glendambo
Coondambo	Coondambo	Coondambo
Coondambo	Glendambo	Coondambo
Coondambo	Coondambo	Coondambo

Glendambo is a town and locality in the Australian state of South Australia located on the Stuart Highway about 592 kilometres (368 mi) from the state capital of Adelaide and about 254 kilometres (158 mi) from Coober Pedy.

The town was constituted on 13 May 1982 and was derived from the Glendambo Homestead. Boundaries for the locality were established on 23 October 2003 and include both the homestead and the Government Town of Glendambo.

As of 2004, the locality was described as follows:

Located 592 km from Adelaide and 186 km north of Port Augusta on the Stuart Highway, Glendambo is an important stopping point on the Stuart Highway as, if you are travelling north, there are no more facilities for 254 km until you reach Coober Pedy. With a population of around 30 people and an annual rainfall of only 185 mm it will never grow into a major centre. It is a comprehensive roadside stopping point with a caravan park, a hotel-motel, a licensed restaurant, roadhouse and general store.

Glendambo is located within the federal Division of Grey, the state electoral district of Giles, the Pastoral Unincorporated Area of South Australia and the state's Far North region. In the absence of a local government authority, the community in Glendambo receives municipal services from a state government agency, the Outback Communities Authority.
