= Roxby Council =

- Local government area
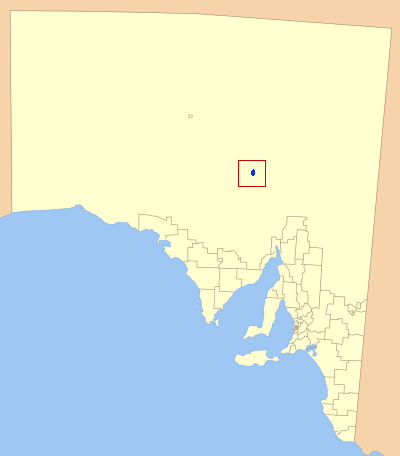
- Location of the Municipal Council of Roxby Downs in blue

- Interactive map of Roxby Council
- Coordinates: 30.5079°S 136.9157°E
- Country: Australia
- State: South Australia
- Region: Far North
- Established: 15 May 1986
- Council seat: Roxby Downs

Government
  - Mayor: Geoff Whitbread (Administrator)
  - State electorate: Giles
  - Federal division: Grey

Area
  - Total: 110 km^{2} (42 sq mi)

Population
  - Total: 3,976 (LGA 2021)
  - Density: 36.1/km^{2} (93/sq mi)
- Website: Roxby Council
LGAs around Roxby Council
Outback Communities Authority	Outback Communities Authority	Outback Communities Authority
Outback Communities Authority	Roxby Council	Outback Communities Authority
Outback Communities Authority	Outback Communities Authority	Outback Communities Authority

The Roxby Council, formerly Roxby Downs Council and Municipal Council of Roxby Downs, is the local government area covering the town of Roxby Downs and the Olympic Dam mine in South Australia. It has an area of 110 km². At the 2021 census, it had a population of 3976. The municipality was constituted on 15 May 1986. It is a unique local government area in South Australia, in that it does not have an elected council but is served by an Administrator who performs all the functions of a Council.

It covers most of the locality of Roxby Downs, except a portion to the east of the town, while also including a section of the adjacent locality of Olympic Dam.

== See also ==
- Local government areas of South Australia
- List of parks and gardens in rural South Australia
