= Woomera, South Australia =

Woomera Village
- Town
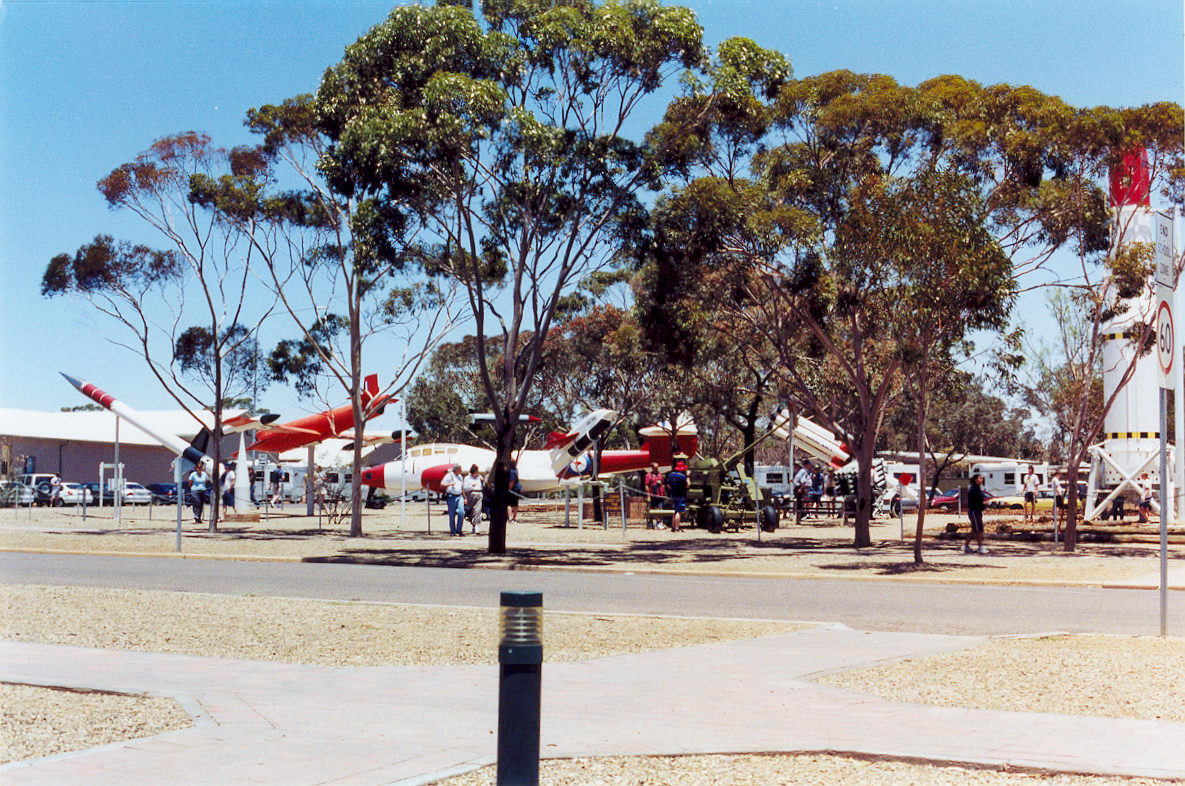
- Missile Park, RAAF Woomera Heritage Centre

- Coordinates: 31°12′0″S 136°49′21″E
- Country: Australia
- State: South Australia
- Location: 446 km (277 mi) N of Adelaide
- Established: 1947 (79 years ago)

Government
  - State electorate: Giles
  - Federal division: Grey
- Elevation: 169 m (554 ft)

Population
  - Total: 132 (SAL 2021)
- Postcode: 5720
- Mean max temp: 25.8 °C (78.4 °F)
- Mean min temp: 12.7 °C (54.9 °F)
- Annual rainfall: 183.9 mm (7.24 in)

Woomera, unofficially Woomera village, is the domestic area of RAAF Base Woomera. Since 1947 it has been a Defence-owned and operated facility. The village is located in the Far North region of South Australia, but is on Commonwealth-owned land and within the area designated as the Woomera Prohibited Area (WPA). The village is approximately 446 kilometres (277 mi) north of Adelaide. In common usage, "Woomera" refers to the wider RAAF Woomera Range Complex (WRC), a large Australian Defence Force aerospace and systems testing range (the Woomera Test Range (WTR)) covering an area of approximately 122,000 square kilometres (47,000 sq mi) and is operated by the Royal Australian Air Force.

Woomera "village" is part of RAAF Base Woomera which, along with the Woomera Test Range (WTR), forms the larger entity known as the Woomera Range Complex (WRC), promulgated by Chief of Air Force (CAF) in June 2014. As at the 2016 census the Woomera Village had a population of 146, and its usual population varies between 150 and 200 people, yet the village can provide accommodation and services for up to 500 people per day. Although the complex is closed to the public, Woomera village, and its four museum elements, is open to the public all year round. The location of the Woomera Village can be described as being in the outback desert area of South Australia. It is approximately 446 kilometres (277 mi) north-west of Adelaide and is in the State region known as the Far North. There are 27 pastoral stations within the Woomera Prohibited Area, which essentially forms the ground space of the Woomera Test Range, and there are currently four major mines (2013) – Challenger, Prominent Hill, Peculiar Knob, and Cairn Hill. There is also a long-established precious gems (mainly opal) field near the Coober Pedy end of the Stuart Highway, which cuts through the middle of the Range.

== Etymology ==
The settlement draws its name, woomera, from a suggestion from RAAF Group Captain Alfred George Pither and was subsequently chosen by the Board of the Long Range Weapons Establishment in April 1947. The new Village was established on Commonwealth land procured for the purpose, and named after the Aboriginal spear throwing implement the woomera which extends the range a spear can be thrown.

== History ==
=== Establishment ===
Woomera, formerly a rocket range site located 183 kilometres (114 mi) north-west of Port Augusta, shares its name with an Aboriginal throwing tool. Construction of Woomera Village began in mid-1947 to cater for thousands of people moving there as part of the Anglo-Australian Project. The project lasted for 34 years and saw Woomera become one of the most secret allied establishments in operation during the Cold War. During its heyday (1949–71), the village population reached around 7,000 as people lived and worked at Woomera and at Koolymilka campsite near Range Head, approximately 42 kilometres (26 mi) west of Woomera village within the Woomera Prohibited Area. However, by the end of the 1960s, the Anglo-Australian Joint Project was rapidly winding down following the UK Government's reduction in further experimental work.

Woomera Village initially operated as a "closed town" between 1947 and 1982, when the facility supported the operations of the Woomera Rocket Range during the Anglo-Australia Project. Since 1982, the general public has been able to visit and stay at Woomera. However, only Australian Government (mostly Department of Defence) personnel and contractors to the Commonwealth are able to live at Woomera on a permanent basis. The settlement was established in 1947 as a result of the Department of Defence establishment of the adjacent rocket testing range. The Woomera Village grew rapidly from 1950. A school opened that year with two teachers and by 1955 had grown to be a "Higher Primary" school from Year 1 to Intermediate (Year 10) with over 300 pupils.

Following its construction over 1947–53, Woomera Village essentially operated under a specialised Commonwealth/Defence township management model rather than a local government (council) model. At the height of its operations (1947–99), over 7,000 people lived in Woomera Village. To service the needs of the town during this period, the Woomera Board, staffed by members of the Defence community at Woomera elected to the Board by town residents, essentially acted in the role normally provided by a local government council. However, the creation of a Defence Estate management organisation in the 1990s shifted the focus of the Board's activities away from estate and infrastructure management toward principally that of a base welfare organisation supporting the small permanent community and the large number of transit Defence personnel who deploy to Woomera each year. Woomera Village, when originally established, was administered by the Long Range Weapons Establishment (LRWE) under the terms of the Anglo-Australian Joint Project. LRWE was based at Salisbury to the north of Adelaide city, the site now occupied by Defence Science and Technology Group (DSTG).

When the Anglo-Australian Joint Project began to wind down in the early 1970s, the village population began to rapidly drop from its peak of about 7000 residents in the mid-1960s. However, with the establishment of the USAF/ADF Joint Defence Communications Facility in 1969 at the nearby Nurrungar site, approximately 18 kilometres (11 mi) south of Woomera, along with its 1100 permanent staff, the village population stabilized at around 4,500 people (including around 800 children). In the late 1990s, as the Nurrungar program was winding down, the ADF reassessed the role of Woomera in its future force structure. What became apparent to the ADF at that time was that the Woomera Test Range was the only land-based test range left in the Western world capable of testing the next (or what is now termed "5th") generation of weapons systems within a fully instrumented, land-based, specialized test and evaluation range. This assessment was to result, positively, in redefining the future role and strategic importance of the Woomera Range Complex within Australia's long-term Defence requirements.

=== Defence facilities ===
Woomera Village is a Department of Defence–owned-and-operated facility. RAAF Base Woomera, when it was established in January 2015, also included the RAAF Woomera Airfield, which is approximately 6 kilometres (3.7 mi) north of Woomera Village. The aerodrome lies within the "Red Zone" of the Woomera Prohibited Area (WPA), and public access to this part of the base is not permitted. Woomera Village, however, is within a "Green Zone" of the WPA and thus public access to the facilities and services of Woomera, including the several museums located in this historic site, is permitted year-round. Visitors may also stay in the Defence-operated Eldo Hotel, and there is a privately operated public caravan park at the entrance to Woomera Village.

While the WRC operates under the higher management of Woomera Range Headquarters (WRHQ), located at RAAF Base Edinburgh, the operation of the Base itself is co-managed by the RAAF's Combat Support Group (CSG) and Defence Estate and Infrastructure Group (DEIG). CSG focus on the operational aspects of the base's role, while DEIG focuses on ensuring the base's (and the Range's) facilities and general infrastructure remains fit-for-purpose to support the Range's activities. Woomera Village has always been, and continues to be, the domestic support facility for the Woomera Range Complex.

As of November 2014, the WPA covers an area of approximately 47 square kilometres (18 sq mi) and forms the essential ground area of the whole Range Complex. The Nurrungar Test Area (NTA) is 18 kilometres (11 mi) south of Woomera, and although not within the WPA, it is under the operational control of Woomera Range Headquarters in Adelaide. The WPA is the world's largest land-based instrumented defence systems test and evaluation range facility.

The complex was established in support of the Anglo-Australian Joint Project. This cold-war project focussed on the development of long-range weapons systems, principally to counter the growing intercontinental ballistic missile threat from the Soviet Union. The cold-war heyday of the Range was 1947 to about 1972. In 1980, the Anglo-Australia Project was closed and the range itself saw little use until about 1991, when the RAAF's Aircraft Research and Development Unit (ARDU) took over the old instrumented range from Defence Science and Technology Organisation (DSTO). Since that time, the RAAF has gradually assumed full control of the entire facility. The complex today is much smaller than it was in 1947, but still covers one-seventh of South Australia. Although there are now several major mines established within the WPA, the Woomera support base is the only permanently established township facility in the WPA.

Officially, the village area is referred to as "Base Sector South" of RAAF Base Woomera, and like RAAF Williams at Point Cook in Victoria, this part of the complex is open to public access. This is principally so that tourists can access the significant historical displays and museums which cover the range's air and space activities since its establishment in 1947. At the Woomera Heritage Centre, there are also displays covering the Indigenous and Pioneer heritage of the region. In particular, there is a dedicated section on Len Beadell, who became something of an outback legend as a Royal Australian Survey Corps Sergeant surveyor (1947–48) and road builder (1953–63). There is also a memorial cairn for Len Beadell and his wife Anne in the nearby Woomera Cemetery.

At the 2016 census, the village had 146 permanent residents, whereas the operation of the complex may be up to an additional 500–700 personnel per day. Public visitors (estimated at in excess of 70,000 per year) generally find Woomera village to be a very quiet place. Principally this is due to the fact that the base is essentially the dinner, bed, and breakfast facility for Defence personnel. Today, the complex embraces a much wider range of Defence systems technology and tactics testing and evaluation activities. In terms of space activities, only a small number of sub-orbital sounding rocket tests are conducted. In June 2010, however, Woomera hosted the return of the Hayabusa Deep Space Probe. This was the first planned space re-entry to Australian soil and created another milestone for the Range.

== Settlement history ==
=== Nurrungar project ===
In 1969, as the Anglo-Australia Project was winding down, the United States Air Force (USAF) began construction and installation of the Nurrungar Joint Tracking Facility. This facility was located approximately 18 kilometres (11 mi) south of Woomera. Over the next 30 years, this project ensured the maintenance of Woomera village infrastructure, with improvements and modernization of facilities. During the period of operations, around 1,100 USAF and ADF personnel and their families were accommodated at Woomera, and the population was around 4,000.

=== The new era of Woomera ===
When the Nurrungar Project came to an end in 1999, the future of the village looked bleak. However, the RAAF was set to take over the range following a long-term study of Defence needs through to 2035, which found that the Woomera Test Range was the only test and evaluation range left in the western world capable of testing the next generation of ADF defence systems within its land borders – and it could be utilized all year round given its climatic advantages. Additionally, the Federal Government decided to establish several immigration detention centres around the country to deal with a growing number of illegal immigrants and asylum seekers arriving by sea, and Woomera was chosen as a site for such a facility.

The establishment of the Woomera Immigration Detention Centre in 1999, through the refurbishment of the original Woomera Village construction camp at "Woomera West", eventually brought in new permanent staff (as the Nurrungar people were leaving) to settle and maintain the village population at around 1,200. The immigration detention centre, however, proved to be a highly controversial facility, and it closed in early 2003 after only about 36 months of operation, at which point the land and buildings were handed back to the Defence Department.

=== Camp Rapier ===
Following the closure of the Immigration Detention Centre, and the return of the site to the ADF, Woomera West was redesigned, altered, and re-established as a secure defence garrison support facility and renamed Camp Rapier. It is now frequently used by the Australian Army and squadrons of the RAAF's Airfield Defence Guards as a base camp for specialized training and testing activities. It also has had a detachment of Australian Air Force Cadets from South Australia stay there.

=== Post-2003 ===
Post-2003, the village population stabilized at about 400, but has subsequently dropped to around 150–200. When the RAAF assumed operational command of Woomera in 1999, there was an increase in the number of temporary residents associated with the conduct of test and evaluation activities on the range. In 2009, Woomera village was the largest ADF domestic base support facility in Australia, and the village is open to public access. There is a high visitation rate by tourists to view the National Missile Park in the centre of the village (which features aircraft, rockets, bombs, and missiles covering the full period of the Range's operations), the Woomera Heritage Centre (which features an introductory audiovisual presentation and an interpretive gallery that tells the story of the site), and the Community Museum that is maintained by the village's volunteer community board and which is located within the missile park precinct.

Generally, the residents of Woomera are defence workers or contractors. There are no privately owned homes in the village, although some are leased to agencies such as the Bureau of Meteorology. The facilities in the village include a gym, hotel, swimming pool, hospital, cinema, school, two museums, and missile park. There is also a supermarket, community radio station (107.3 Triple-R FM Woomera – "rocket range radio"), post office, bowling alley, a football sports club (Sporties), Returned Services League, Thrift Shop, and Bowling Club.

The village is jointly managed by the RAAF and the Defence Estate & Infrastructure Group (E&IG). Garrison support services for the complex are provided by Defence contractors managed by E&IG. These services include care and maintenance of the base and range infrastructure, messing, accommodation, security, and limited emergency response and airfield service as well as operational support to Defence activities on the Range.

== Climate ==
Woomera has a hot desert climate (Köppen: BWh) with hot summers, mild winters and low rainfall year-round. The highest recorded temperature is 48.2 °C (118.8 °F) on 20 December 2019, whilst the lowest is −1.4 °C (29.5 °F) on 12 August 1966.

Climate data for Woomera (31º09'36"S, 136º48'36"E, 167 m AMSL) (1949-2024 normals and extremes)
Month	Jan	Feb	Mar	Apr	May	Jun	Jul	Aug	Sep	Oct	Nov	Dec	Year
Record high °C (°F)	48.1 (118.6)	46.8 (116.2)	43.0 (109.4)	39.9 (103.8)	31.4 (88.5)	28.9 (84.0)	28.6 (83.5)	34.1 (93.4)	38.6 (101.5)	41.9 (107.4)	46.9 (116.4)	48.2 (118.8)	48.2 (118.8)
Mean daily maximum °C (°F)	34.7 (94.5)	33.8 (92.8)	30.6 (87.1)	25.6 (78.1)	20.7 (69.3)	17.4 (63.3)	17.1 (62.8)	19.0 (66.2)	22.9 (73.2)	26.5 (79.7)	29.9 (85.8)	32.5 (90.5)	25.9 (78.6)
Mean daily minimum °C (°F)	19.7 (67.5)	19.4 (66.9)	17.0 (62.6)	13.2 (55.8)	9.4 (48.9)	6.7 (44.1)	5.8 (42.4)	6.8 (44.2)	9.5 (49.1)	12.5 (54.5)	15.4 (59.7)	17.8 (64.0)	12.8 (55.0)
Record low °C (°F)	8.3 (46.9)	10.3 (50.5)	8.4 (47.1)	4.8 (40.6)	−0.3 (31.5)	0.0 (32.0)	−0.9 (30.4)	−1.4 (29.5)	1.8 (35.2)	4.4 (39.9)	5.5 (41.9)	8.8 (47.8)	−1.4 (29.5)
Average precipitation mm (inches)	18.1 (0.71)	18.6 (0.73)	12.5 (0.49)	12.8 (0.50)	17.1 (0.67)	16.0 (0.63)	13.6 (0.54)	12.8 (0.50)	14.1 (0.56)	16.7 (0.66)	16.7 (0.66)	14.7 (0.58)	183.8 (7.24)
Average precipitation days (≥ 0.2 mm)	3.1	2.4	2.5	3.0	4.8	5.5	5.4	5.1	4.5	4.3	4.5	3.6	48.7
Average afternoon relative humidity (%)	21	23	26	31	39	45	43	36	30	24	22	22	30
Average dew point °C (°F)	5.2 (41.4)	6.5 (43.7)	5.7 (42.3)	4.9 (40.8)	4.7 (40.5)	4.0 (39.2)	2.7 (36.9)	1.3 (34.3)	1.0 (33.8)	0.8 (33.4)	1.8 (35.2)	3.7 (38.7)	3.5 (38.3)
Mean monthly sunshine hours	341.0	296.6	300.7	264.0	232.5	207.0	226.3	260.4	273.0	300.7	312.0	328.6	3,342.8
Percentage possible sunshine	79	80	79	78	71	68	71	76	76	75	76	75	75
Source: Bureau of Meteorology (1949-2024 normals and extremes)

== Woomera village today ==
The population of Woomera is about 136 permanent residents. However, this number can quadruple with the passage of personnel moving in and out of the base as part of range trials activities. 40 years ago, the people who conducted the trials also lived at Woomera; however, with modern communications technology, only the people who provide the range support services now need to live at Woomera. Annually, a total of about 5,000 to 6,000 people deploy to Woomera to conduct tests, trials, and training activities at the Range.

The management of the Range's infrastructure is the responsibility of Defence Support and Reform Group (DSRG), but the Woomera Board is a long-standing and integral part of the base's local support network. The Woomera Board is composed of five elected members from the village's permanent residents, and four members who are appointed by the current Base Support Manager. The aim of the Woomera Board is to build the sense of community, given its remote location. The Board also prints a weekly news letter – Gibber Gabber.

The base is located in the Woomera Prohibited Area (WPA) and it is an RAAF establishment. However, similar to the RAAF Base at Point Cook, Woomera is open to the visiting public. Non-Defence visitors to Woomera are able to stay at the Eldo Hotel, which offers 400 beds in a varying range of formats. The hotel reception, including the "Oasis" bar and restaurant, is located in the former Eldo administration facility. Rooms are generally located close to the main hotel facility and some blocks have names such as "Redstone", "Black Knight", "Blue Steel" and "Skylark" – all former rocket or missile systems once tested at Woomera. The nearby "Traveller's Village Caravan Park" is a privately operated venture centred around the old "senior ranks' mess" facility at the entrance to the base from the main road. It mostly services the motor home and backpacker travellers passing through Woomera.

== Tourism ==
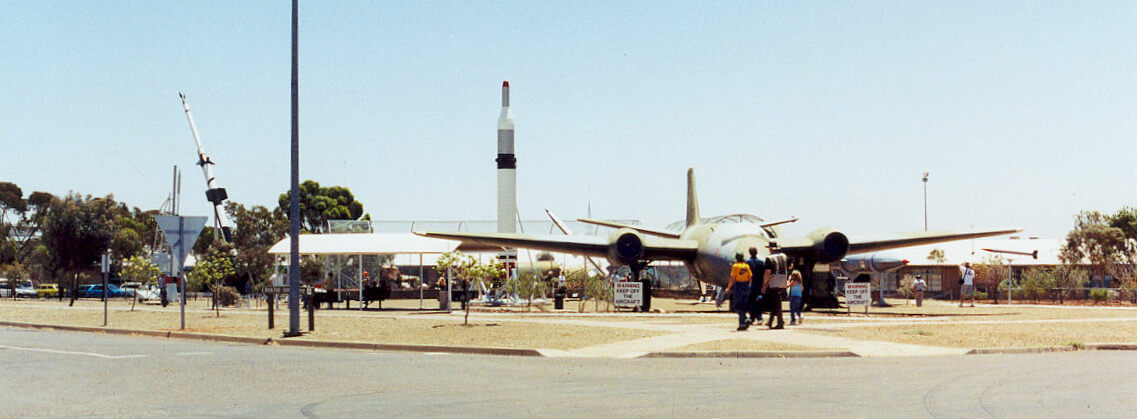
Northern section of Missile Park

Woomera's attractions include the Woomera National Aerospace and Missile Park, located near the centre of the village. This park features missiles and rockets that were developed and tested at Woomera over the last 60 years, as well as a number of aircraft which were used in trials at Woomera. The Woomera Heritage Centre, which was the former recreation centre for USAF personnel and their families from Nurrungar, features a cafe, a tenpin bowling alley (which was installed by the US Air Force personnel in the 1990s and is still in good working order), a modern interactive display and interpretive centre covering the full life of the Range, a souvenir shop, and a significant display of regional history. This display also features the story of Len Beadell, the famous surveyor who laid out the original range across vast tracts of the Australian Outback stretching from Woomera to the northwest coast of Western Australia. Next to Missile Park, there is a museum featuring range artifacts and the activities and people who lived and worked at Woomera in the early years. This museum is located in the former Church of England, one of four former churches which existed in Woomera. Other attractions include a movie theatre (but movie screenings might be infrequent), swimming centre, a well-stocked general store, and bottle shop, along with two main clubs which offer counter meals on a Thursday (RSL Club) and Friday (Sports Club) nights. Woomera is a haven for observing and understanding Australia's desert flora and fauna, and there is a space observatory which operates one night a week or by appointment.

The historic precinct of the town attracts visitors to view local attractions including the Missile Park, Heritage Centre, History Museum and other attractions such as Butement Square, the Eldo Hotel (formerly the "Eldo Mess" for personnel working with the European Launcher Development Organisation (ELDO). There were three other "Messes": Senior, Staff and Junior Staff ("Jazza") based on military ranking, and then Eldo), and the local observatory. Approximately 65,000 tourists a year visit Woomera, with about half of that number going on to visit Roxby Downs (location of the BHP Olympic Dam Mine).

== See also ==
- British nuclear tests at Maralinga
- RAAF Woomera Range Complex
- RAAF Woomera Airfield
