= Roxby Downs, South Australia =

Roxby Downs
- Town
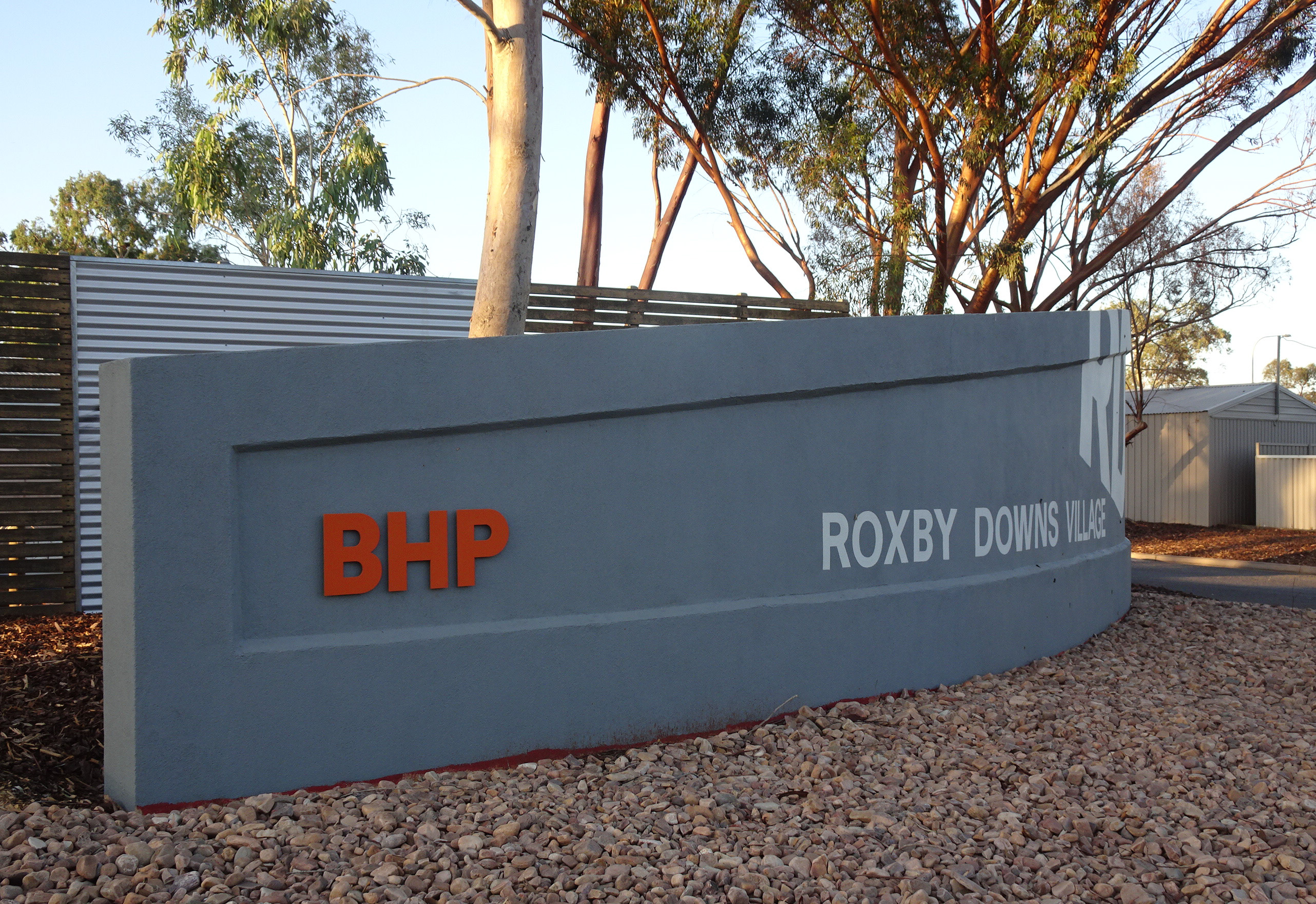
- A BHP-sponsored village in Roxby Downs

- Coordinates: 30°33′45″S 136°52′42″E
- Country: Australia
- State: South Australia
- Region: Far North
- LGAs: Municipal Council of Roxby Downs; Pastoral Unincorporated Area
- Location: 511 km (318 mi) N of Adelaide; 10.6 km (6.6 mi) S of Olympic Dam
- Established: 20 November 1986 (town)

Government
  - State electorate: Stuart
  - Federal division: Grey

Population
  - Total: 3,884 (2016 census)
- Time zone: UTC+9:30 (ACST)
  - Summer (DST): UTC+10:30 (ACST)
- Postcode: 5725
- Mean max temp: 27.8 °C (82.0 °F)
- Mean min temp: 12.7 °C (54.9 °F)
- Annual rainfall: 149.3 mm (5.88 in)
Localities around Roxby Downs
Olympic Dam	Olympic Dam	Olympic Dam; Andamooka Station
Roxby Downs Station	Roxby Downs	Andamooka Station
Roxby Downs Station	Roxby Downs Station	Andamooka Station

Roxby Downs is a town and locality in the Australian state of South Australia about 511 kilometres (318 mi) north of the state capital of Adelaide. The town has a highly transient population of around 4,000 people.

Roxby Downs has many leisure and community facilities including swimming, cinema, cultural precinct, community radio, shopping centre, schools, TAFE, cafes and sporting clubs and facilities. There are just two neighbouring towns in the area: Andamooka, an opal mining town about 30 km to the east, and Woomera, 84 km south of Roxby Downs. Andamooka people call the town home, and many are of European background since the days of early opal mining.

== History ==
The town of Roxby Downs was built in 1986-88 (land survey commenced in November 1986) with the aim of servicing the Olympic Dam mine and processing plant, located 16 kilometres (9.9 mi) north of the site of the town. Roxby Downs was officially opened on 5 November 1988. The opening was celebrated with a "town party" held on the main oval and sponsored by the then owners of the operation Olympic Dam Project (O.D.P.). The town is subject to a specific Indenture Act and is administered by the Municipal Council of Roxby Downs in the form of an appointed Administrator.

== Water supply ==
Water is extracted from the Great Artesian Basin and desalinated by the operators of the Olympic Dam mine. It is then supplied via pipeline. In 2004, the township was estimated to consume a daily average of 3 megalitres.

== Governance ==
Roxby Downs is located within the federal division of Grey, the state electoral district of Stuart and the state government region of the Far North, and with land within the town of Roxby Downs being located in the local government area of the Municipal Council of Roxby Downs and the remainder of the locality of Roxby Downs being located in the Pastoral Unincorporated Area of South Australia.

== Environment ==
Roxby Downs is in an area, like many other arid zones in Australia, that was very badly overgrazed by sheep and cattle during the nineteenth century, as pastoralism was introduced by European settlers. This caused many long-lived species of trees and shrubs to give way to short-lived annual plants and weed species. It was estimated that there were once at least 27 species of Australian mammals in the region, but by 2016 over 60 percent had become either completely or locally extinct since European settlement.

Introduced feral rabbits, cats and foxes exacerbated the threat to both flora and fauna. Some bird species, including the bush thick-knee and plains wanderer, are now either locally extinct or classed as an endangered species, and many of the medium-sized desert mammals are now completely extinct or only exist on a few islands of Australia.

=== Arid Recovery ===
The Arid Recovery Reserve is a wildlife conservation reserve 20 km (12 mi) north of Roxby Downs, about 550 km (340 mi) north of Adelaide. As of 2024, the fenced area of the reserve consists of 123 km^{2} (47 sq mi) of arid land. The initiative known as Arid Recovery was established in 1997 by Katherine Moseby and John Read, whose vision was the creation of a reserve dedicated to restoring the ecosystem, which meant keeping feral animals such as rabbits, cats and foxes out. WMC Resources, the South Australian Department for Environment and Heritage, the University of Adelaide and a community group formed a committee. The first reserve was created when fences were constructed around 14 km^{2} (5.4 sq mi), and it has grown from there. The current (2024) board of directors consists of mainly independent directors, but also has representatives from Bush Heritage Australia, BHP, Adelaide University, and the Department for Environment and Water. Its three-pronged focus is on conservation, research and education.

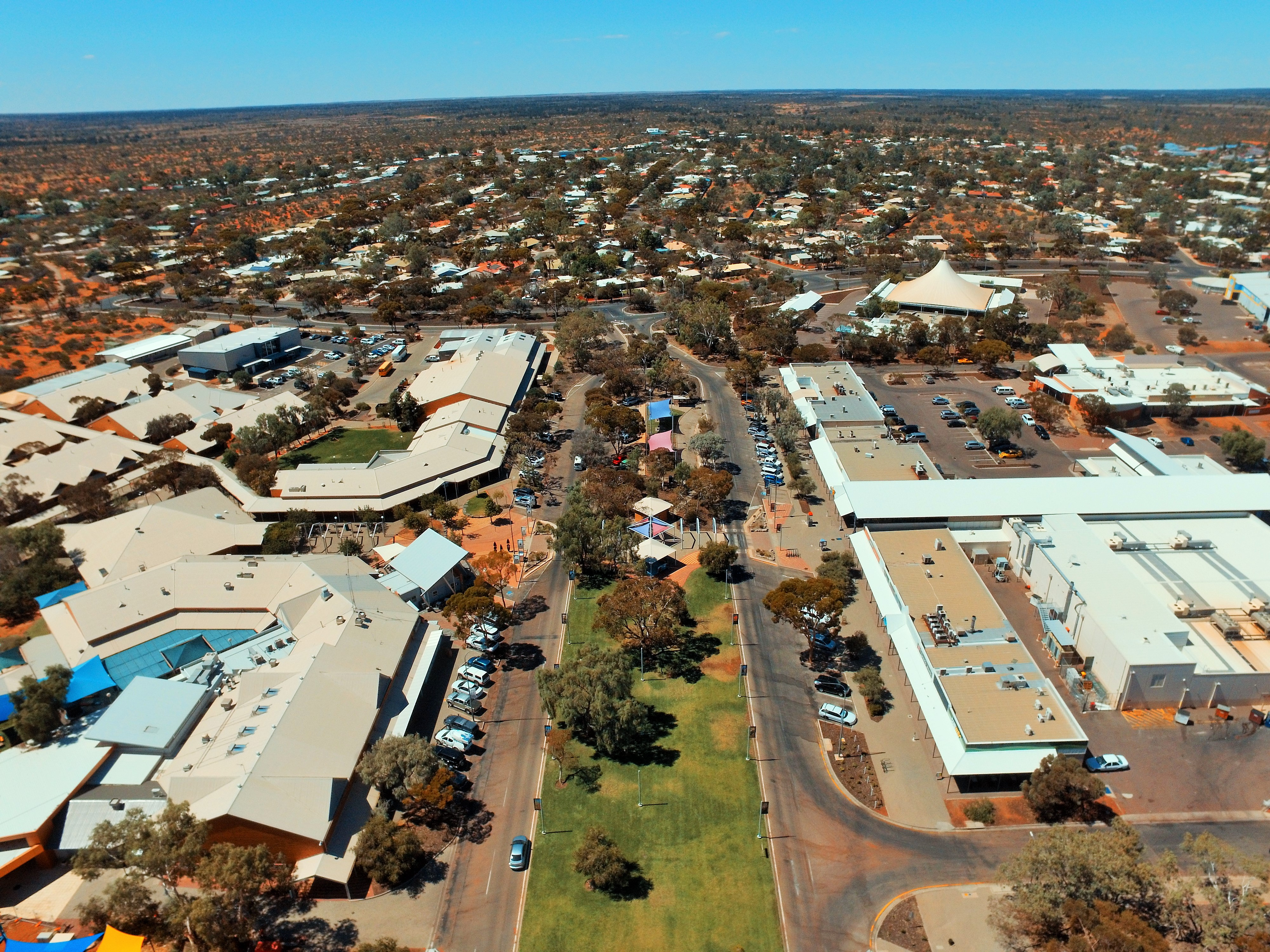
Roxby Downs in 2017

In October 2020, nine bilbies – four males and five females – were released into the Arid Recovery Reserve, with the aim of increasing the gene pool. The first bilbies had been brought in 2000, with a second group ten years later, and this is the third release. These bilbies were caught on Thistle Island, which has a very large population of the marsupials.

Heavy rainfall in January 2022 led to the reserve's annual survey finding the second highest number of native animals in 25 years, with particularly high numbers of reptiles such as skinks and geckos.

=== Climate ===
Roxby Downs has a subtropical desert climate (Köppen: BWh), with very hot summers and mild winters. There is large seasonal variation due to the town's inland location. Average maxima vary between 36.9 °C (98.4 °F) in January and 18.5 °C (65.3 °F) in June while average minima fluctuate between 21.3 °C (70.3 °F) in January and 4.3 °C (39.7 °F) in July. The mean annual precipitation is very low, 149.3 millimetres (5.88 in), though well-distributed across the year, occurring within 42.3 precipitation days. Extreme temperatures have ranged from 49.6 °C (121.3 °F) on 29 January 2026 to −6.0 °C (21.2 °F) on 30 June 2002. Climate data was sourced from the nearby Olympic Dam mine north of the town.

Climate data for Roxby Downs (30º29'24"S, 136º52'12"E, 99 m AMSL) (1997-2024 normals and extremes)
Month	Jan	Feb	Mar	Apr	May	Jun	Jul	Aug	Sep	Oct	Nov	Dec	Year
Record high °C (°F)	49.6 (121.3)	46.8 (116.2)	43.4 (110.1)	40.0 (104.0)	33.0 (91.4)	28.1 (82.6)	29.0 (84.2)	34.6 (94.3)	39.0 (102.2)	42.0 (107.6)	47.4 (117.3)	47.4 (117.3)	49.6 (121.3)
Mean daily maximum °C (°F)	36.9 (98.4)	35.7 (96.3)	32.4 (90.3)	27.3 (81.1)	22.2 (72.0)	18.5 (65.3)	18.7 (65.7)	20.9 (69.6)	25.4 (77.7)	28.5 (83.3)	32.0 (89.6)	34.6 (94.3)	27.8 (82.0)
Mean daily minimum °C (°F)	21.3 (70.3)	20.1 (68.2)	17.4 (63.3)	12.7 (54.9)	8.7 (47.7)	5.2 (41.4)	4.3 (39.7)	5.6 (42.1)	9.2 (48.6)	12.8 (55.0)	16.4 (61.5)	19.0 (66.2)	12.7 (54.9)
Record low °C (°F)	11.5 (52.7)	11.0 (51.8)	5.0 (41.0)	1.0 (33.8)	−3.0 (26.6)	−6.0 (21.2)	−5.0 (23.0)	−4.0 (24.8)	−1.1 (30.0)	2.2 (36.0)	6.0 (42.8)	8.0 (46.4)	−6.0 (21.2)
Average precipitation mm (inches)	17.1 (0.67)	14.7 (0.58)	7.1 (0.28)	16.5 (0.65)	8.1 (0.32)	15.6 (0.61)	6.3 (0.25)	8.8 (0.35)	8.9 (0.35)	15.9 (0.63)	14.1 (0.56)	16.5 (0.65)	149.3 (5.88)
Average precipitation days (≥ 0.2 mm)	3.3	2.6	2.5	3.3	3.1	4.3	3.3	3.7	3.8	4.0	4.2	4.2	42.3
Average afternoon relative humidity (%)	18	21	22	27	34	41	39	32	25	21	21	19	27
Average dew point °C (°F)	4.4 (39.9)	6.0 (42.8)	4.4 (39.9)	4.1 (39.4)	4.2 (39.6)	3.9 (39.0)	2.7 (36.9)	1.3 (34.3)	1.0 (33.8)	0.0 (32.0)	2.5 (36.5)	3.1 (37.6)	3.1 (37.6)
Source: Bureau of Meteorology (1997-2024 normals and extremes)
