= Roxby =

Roxby may refer to:

== Places ==
- Roxby, Lincolnshire, England
- Roxby, North Yorkshire, England
- Roxby, a former settlement in the civil parish of Pickhill with Roxby, North Yorkshire, England
- Roxby, a former manor at Thornton-le-Dale, North Yorkshire, England
- Roxby Council, South Australia

== People ==
- Roxby (surname)
- Henry Roxby Benson (1818–1892), British army officer
- Henry Roxby Beverley (1790–1863), English actor
- Stephen Roxby Dodds (1881–1943), English lawyer and politician
- William Roxby Beverly (c. 1810–1889), English scene-painter

== See also ==
Roxby Downs (disambiguation)
