= Robert Roxby =

Robert Roxby may refer to:

- Robert Roxby (actor) (c. 1809–1866), English actor and stage manager
- Robert Roxby (songwriter) (1767–1846), English songwriter and poet
- Robert Roxby (cricketer) (1926–2010), Australian cricketer
