= Carl Langhans =

Carl Langhans may refer to:

- Carl Gotthard Langhans (1732–1808), Prussian master builder and royal architect
- Carl Ferdinand Langhans (1782–1869), his son, Prussian architect
