= William Beverly =

William Beverly may refer to:

- Bill Beverly (born 1965), American crime writer
- William Roxby Beverly (1810–1889), English theatrical scene painter
