= Roxby (surname) =

Roxby is a surname. Notable people with the name include:

- Alice Maude-Roxby (born 1963), multidisciplinary artist
- David Howard Maude-Roxby-Montalto di Fragnito (born 1934), British artist
- Guy Roxby (1886–1913), Anglican missionary priest
- Robert Roxby (actor) (c.1809–1866), British actor
- Robert Roxby (cricketer) (1926–2010), Australian cricketer
- Robert Roxby (songwriter) (1767–1846), English songwriter
- Roddy Maude-Roxby (born 1930), English actor
