= Thomas Doubleday =

19th-century English politician and author

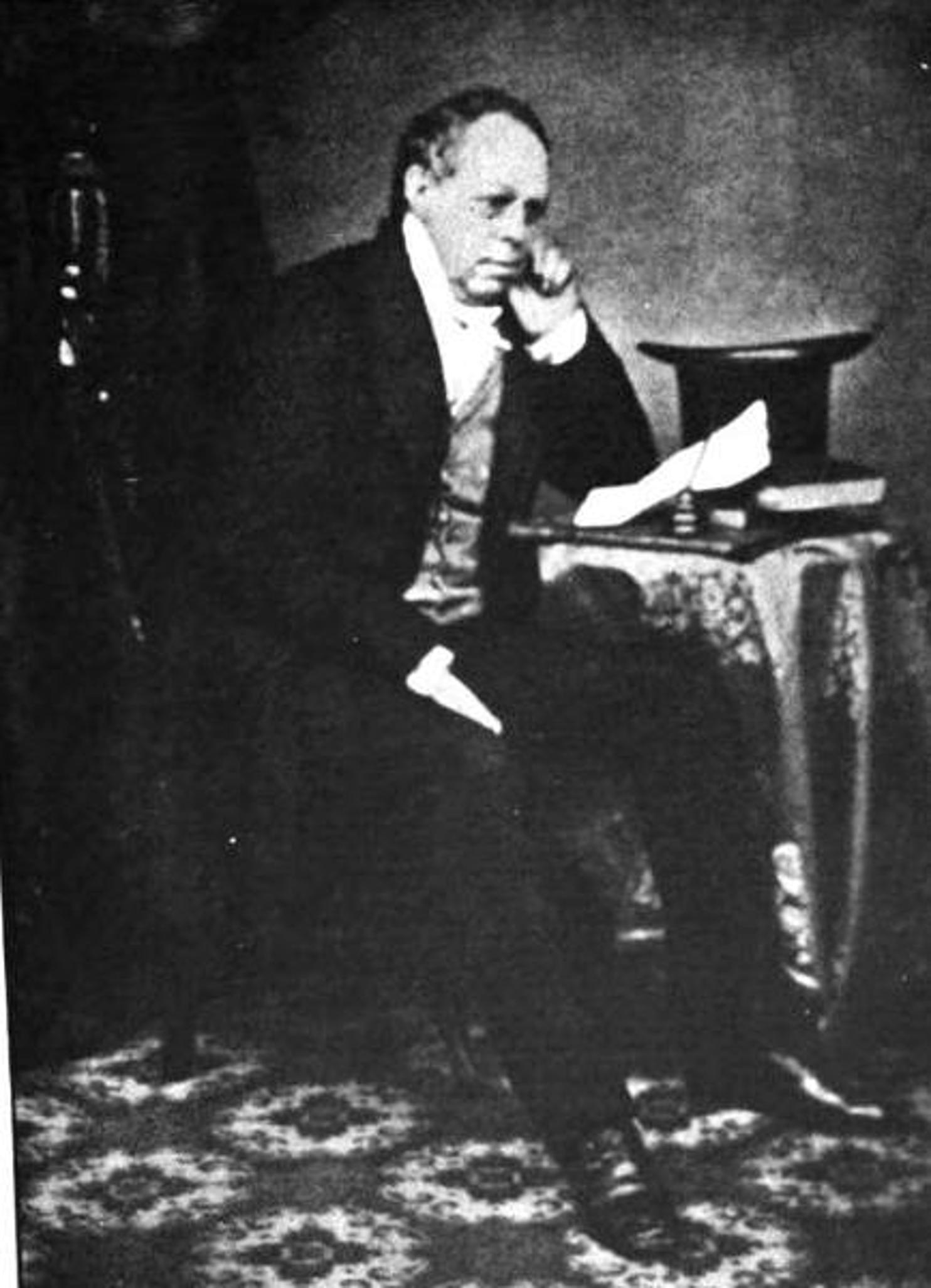
Thomas Doubleday

Thomas Doubleday (February 1790 – 18 December 1870) was an English politician and writer. He was a keen observer of political events.

== Life ==
He was born in Newcastle-on-Tyne. In early life he adopted the views of William Cobbett, and was active in promoting the agitation which resulted in the passing of the Reform Bill of 1832. As secretary of the Northern Political Union of Whigs and Radicals he took a prominent part in forwarding the interests of Earl Grey and the reforming party. In 1858–1859, he was a member of the council of the Northern Reform Union; and to the last he was a keen observer of political events.

He succeeded his father, George Doubleday, as partner in a firm of soap manufacturers at Newcastle, but devoted his attention rather to literature than to mercantile affairs. On the failure of the firm he obtained the office of registrar of St Andrews parish, Newcastle, a post which he held until appointed secretary to the coal trade.

Thomas Doubleday died at Bulmans Village, Newcastle-on-Tyne in 1870.

== Works ==
In 1832 he published an Essay on Mundane Moral Government, and in 1842 he attacked some of the principles of Malthus in his True Law of Population. He also wrote A Political Life of Sir Robert Peel (London, 1856); A Financial, Statistical and Monetary History of England from 1688 (London, 1847); Matter for Materialists (London, 1870); The Eve of St Mark: a romance of Venice (London, 1857, concerning a Catholic exile in Venice in the late 16th century); and three dramas, The Statue Wife, Diocletian and Caius Marius, in addition to some fishing songs, the folk song The Snows They Melt The Soonest and many contributions to various newspapers and periodicals. His song writing and poetry were generally written as a joint collaboration with his inseparable friend Robert Roxby.

In 1857 Doubleday published an open letter to the Duke of Northumberland about the work of the Ancient Melodies Committee of the Society of Antiquaries; he welcomed their work, but criticised its slow progress. He pointed out, in particular, that the Northumbrian Smallpipes' closed fingering meant that it had a brilliant staccato sound, making it quite unsuitable for playing sentimental airs and waltzes, which was becoming common among some contemporary players. He argued instead that the instrument should be used for playing its traditional repertoire.

== See also ==
- Geordie dialect words
- Robert Roxby
