= Transformation scene =

Theatrical convention of metamorphosis

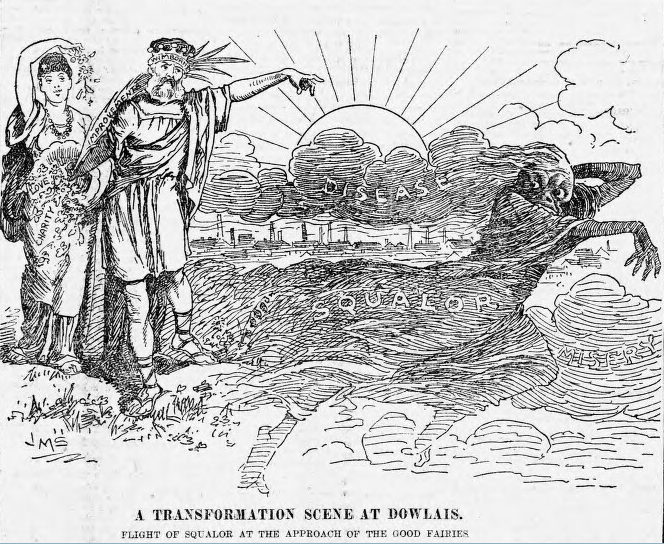
Transformation scene in a political cartoon of 1898

The transformation scene is a theatrical convention of metamorphosis, in which a character, group of characters, stage properties or scenery undergo visible change. Transformation scenes were already standard in the European theatrical tradition with the masques of the 17th century. They may rely on both stage machinery and lighting effects for their dramatic impact.

== In the Early Modern masque ==
The masques of Inigo Jones and Ben Jonson settled into a form that had an antimasque preceding a courtly display, the two parts being linked by a transformation scene. The scene is an abstract representation of the royal power of bringing harmony. Comus, the masque written by the poet John Milton, implies a transformation scene heralded by the arrival of the character Sabrina.

== British pantomime and extravaganza ==
Change by theatrical means has been seen as central to the pantomime of the Victorian period. After a long evolution, a transformation scene then became standard at the end of Act 1 or beginning of Act 2 of a pantomime. The convention in the middle of the 19th century was of a long transformation scene, of up to 15 minutes.

In the later 18th century, genres including the harlequinade and masque began or ended with a transformation scene to a temple, drawing to a close with the suggestion of harmony restored. John Rich, earlier in the century, made Harlequin with his slap stick able to transform stage props; and later Joseph Grimaldi as Clown was in charge of transformations. Early pantomime related to and contained the traditional harlequinade by means of a transition in which a group of characters descended from the traditional types from the commedia dell'arte were transformed and "revealed" as being the key characters in the pantomime of the fairy tale that followed. A production in 1781 of Robinson Crusoe by Richard Brinsley Sheridan is credited with breaking down the rigid separation implied by the transformation, leading to the 19th century view of pantomime.

In 1881, Percy Fitzgerald described the transformation scene of an extravaganza as follows:

First the "gauzes" lift slowly one behind the other – perhaps the most pleasing of all scenic effects – giving glimpses of "the Realms of Bliss", seen behind in a tantalizing fashion. Then is revealed a kind of half-glorified country, clouds and banks, evidently concealing much. Always a sort of pathetic and at the same time exultant [musical] strain rises. ... Now some of the banks begin to part slowly, showing realms of light, with a few divine beings – fairies – rising slowly here and there [in an aerial pyramid]. ... [T]he lights streaming on full, in every colour and from every quarter, in the richest effulgence. [Finally], the most glorious paradise of all will open, revealing the pure empyrean itself, and some fair spirit aloft in a cloud among the stars, the apex of all. Then, all motion ceases; the work is complete; the fumes of crimson, green and blue fire begin to rise at the wings; the music bursts into a crash of exultation; and, possibly to the general disenchantment, a burly man in a black frock steps out from the side and bows awkwardly. Then to shrill whistle, the first scene of the harlequinade closes in, and shuts out the brilliant vision. [These magnificent scenes] are significant of English energy, and cannot be approached in foreign theatres.

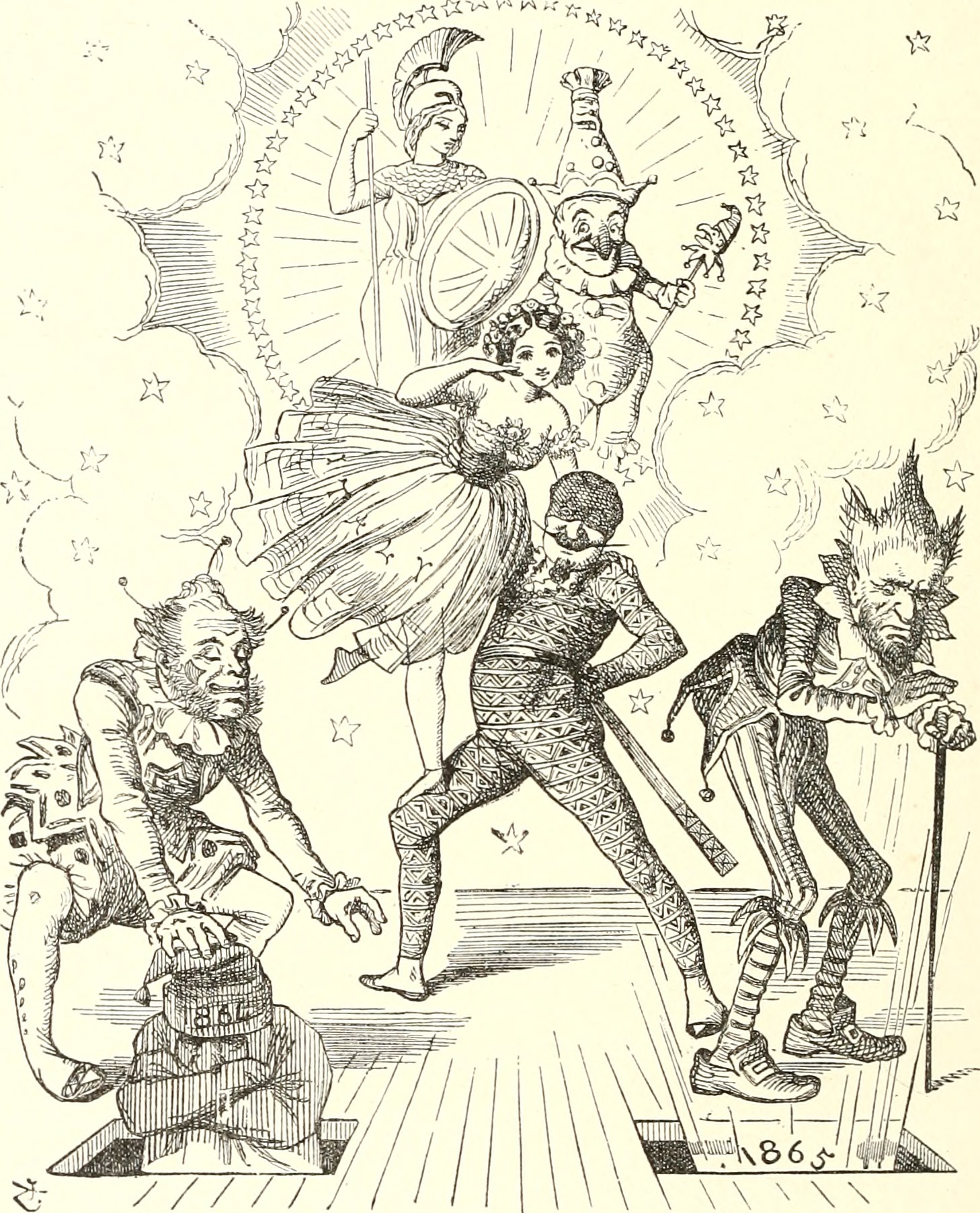
A transformation scene parody, in a British political cartoon from 1864

The dominance of transformation scenes as spectacular ends in themselves has been attributed to the work of William Roxby Beverly, from 1849. By the 1860s, Beverly's work as a scene painter displaced the costume change bringing in the harlequinade in some productions. The extravaganza became differentiated from the pantomime by, among other things, the centrality of a "magical transformation scene" and the diminishing of the harlequinade clowning. Some British and American Victorian burlesques also retained a transformation scene.

== Realms of Bliss ==
In the later Victorian pantomime, and before the era of the pantomime dame initiated by Dan Leno, a transformation scene revealing Fairyland was the stock ending. As described by Percy Hetherington Fitzgerald, by a slow process a well-lit landscape appears (the "Realms of Bliss"). And in it, fairies are seen, rising from the ground, or hanging in the air. In The Adventures of Philip by William Makepeace Thackeray from the early 1860s, "The Realms of Bliss" is the title of the final chapter, and Thackeray can assume his readers were familiar with the penultimate "dark scene" that precedes it, the entrance of the Good Fairy, and the ultimate wedding of Harlequin and Columbine. An 1886 musical version of Alice in Wonderland, classed as an extravaganza, revealed the Realms of Bliss at the start, darkening only at the end when Alice awakes. Peter Pan is embedded in the pantomime tradition, and in its original stage production of 1904, Peter Pan, or The Boy Who Wouldn't Grow Up, ended with a magical transformation scene, returning to Neverland.
