= Old Palace, Berlin =

Old Palace
- Altes Palais
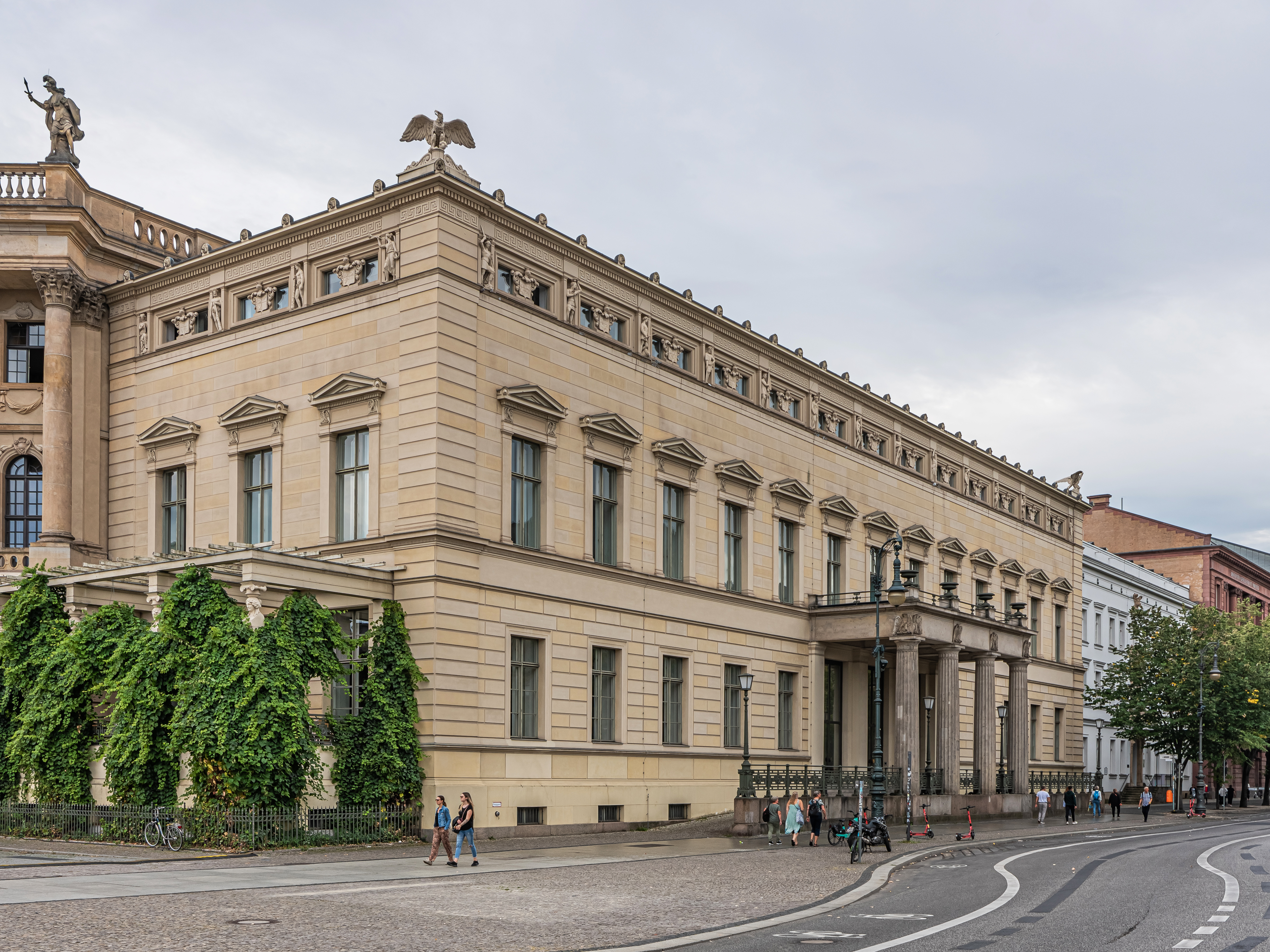
- Old Palace
- Interactive map of the Old Palace area
- Alternative names: Kaiser Wilhelm Palace

General information
- Type: Palace
- Architectural style: Neoclassical
- Location: Unter den Linden, Berlin, Germany
- Coordinates: 52.5169°N 13.3928°E
- Construction started: 1834
- Completed: 1837
- Renovated: 1963–1964

Design and construction
- Architect: Carl Ferdinand Langhans

The Old Palace (German: Altes Palais), also called Kaiser Wilhelm Palace (Kaiser-Wilhelm-Palais), is a former royal Prussian residence on Unter den Linden boulevard in Mitte, the historic heart and city center of Berlin. It was built between 1834 and 1837 by order of Prince William of Prussia, who later became William I, German Emperor, according to plans by Carl Ferdinand Langhans in Neoclassical style. Damaged during the Allied bombing in World War II, the Old Palace was rebuilt from 1963 to 1964 as part of the Forum Fridericianum. Since then, the listed building has been home to the law faculty of the Humboldt-Universität.

== History ==
On the site of the Old Palace stood previously a town house built between 1688 and 1692 by Ernst Bernhard von Weyler, the chief of the Brandenburg artillery. His son Christian Ernst, who moved to Vienna, sold it to Philip William, Margrave of Brandenburg-Schwedt. His descendant Margrave Frederick William had it converted into a baroque palace by Carl Ludwig Hildebrandt. The building, sold at the end of the 18th century, later served the chiefs of the III. Army Corps as a residence. As such, Prince William moved into it in 1829.

His elder brother, the Prussian Crown Prince Frederick William, hired one of the most prominent architects of Germany, Karl Friedrich Schinkel, to design a memorial complex for Frederick the Great. However, his plan would have provided for the demolition of the adjoining library of Frederick the Great in order to make room for a huge new building for Prince William with two towers. However, William found the plan both irreverent and too expensive. Being disappointed with the plans of Schinkel, he accepted the more modest concept of the architect Carl Ferdinand Langhans in neoclassical style. As the construction of the palace was completed in 1837, the then Prince William began using the building as his residence where he and his wife brought up their children. The palace was built with a pergola, a mezzanine and a vestibule. Even after William ascended the throne as king, later Emperor William I, he continued to live in this home until his death in 1888, while he only used the Berlin Palace for representative purposes.

== Images ==
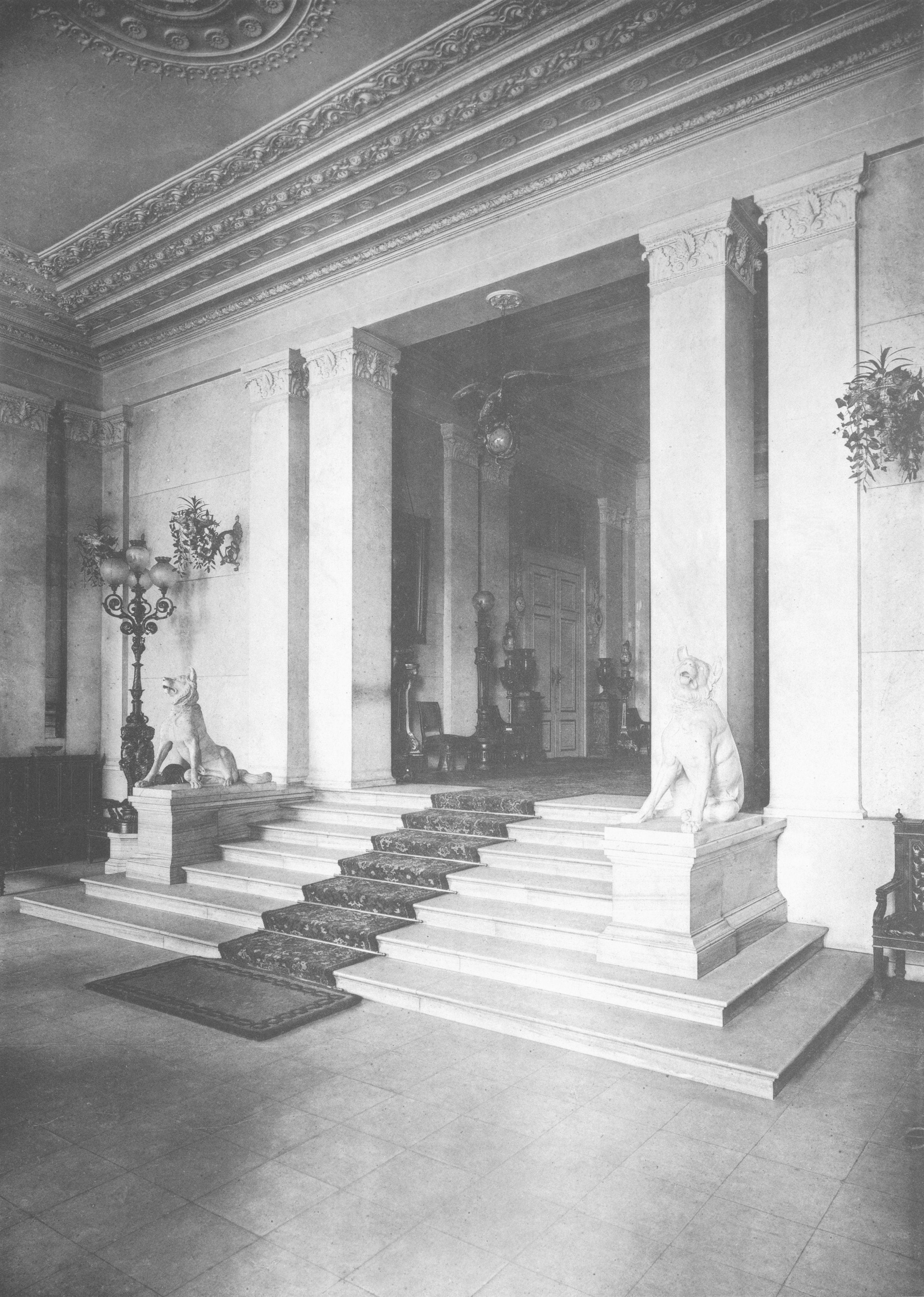
Vestibule

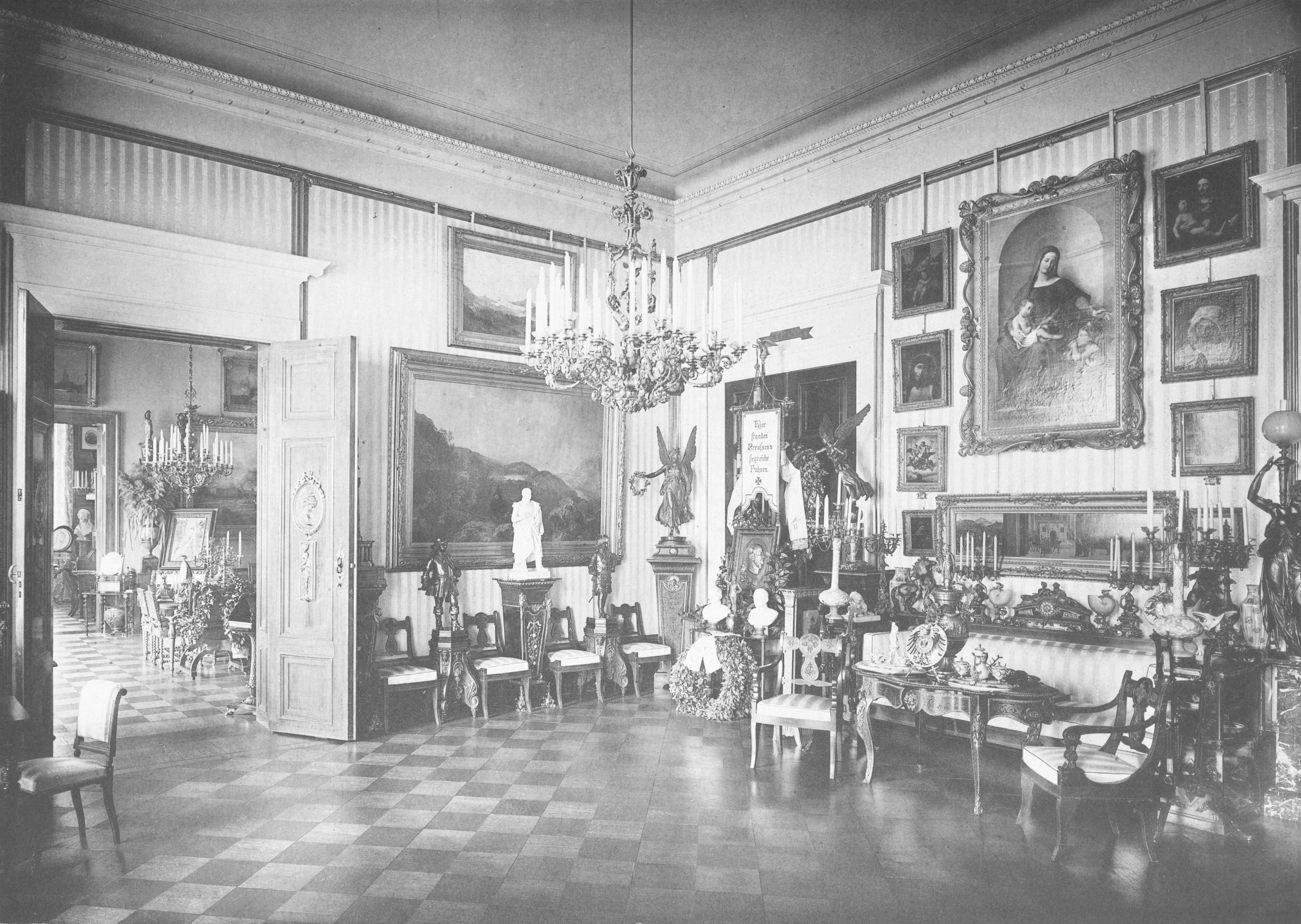
Reception room

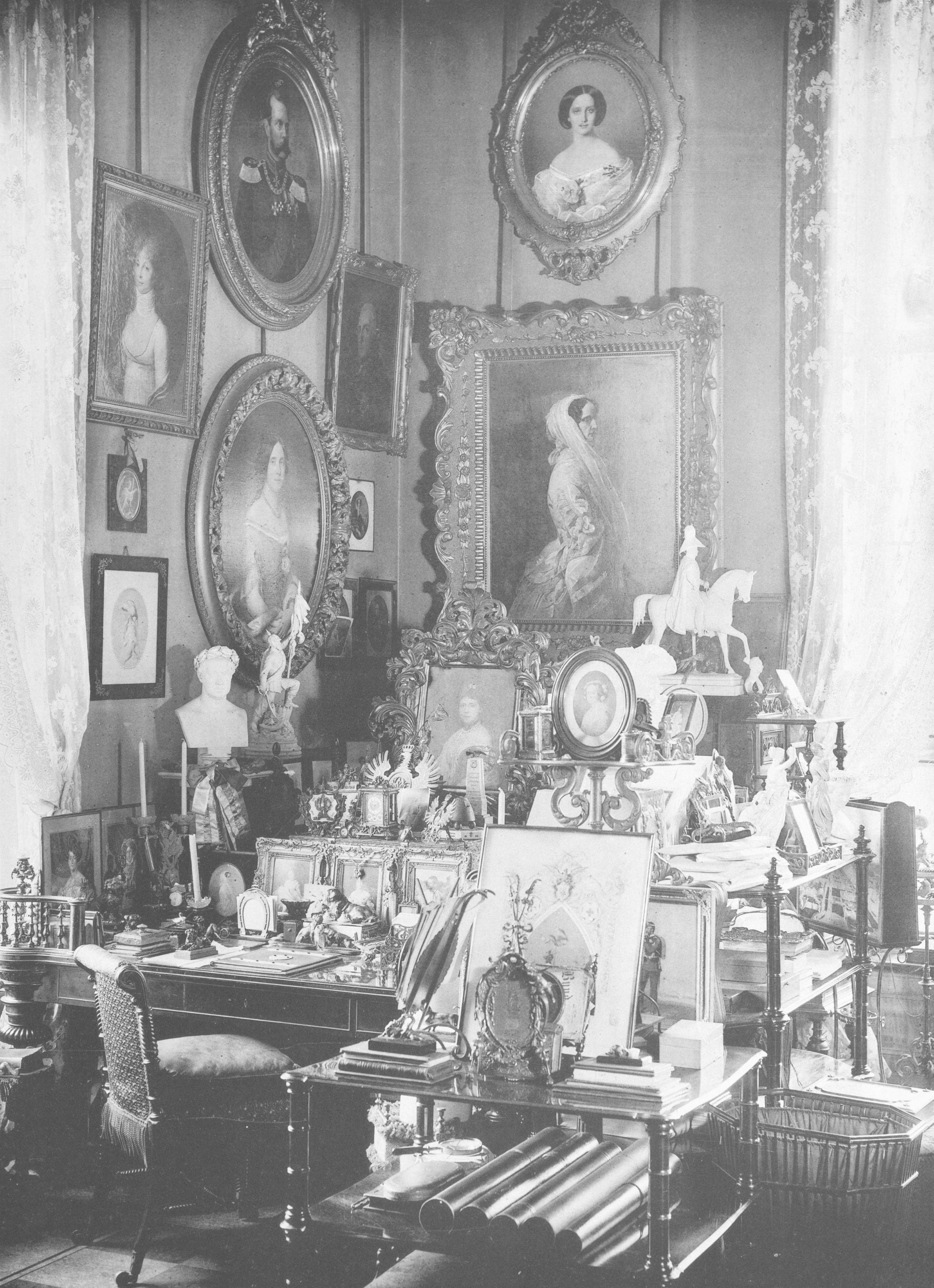
Working table of Kaiser Wilhelm I.

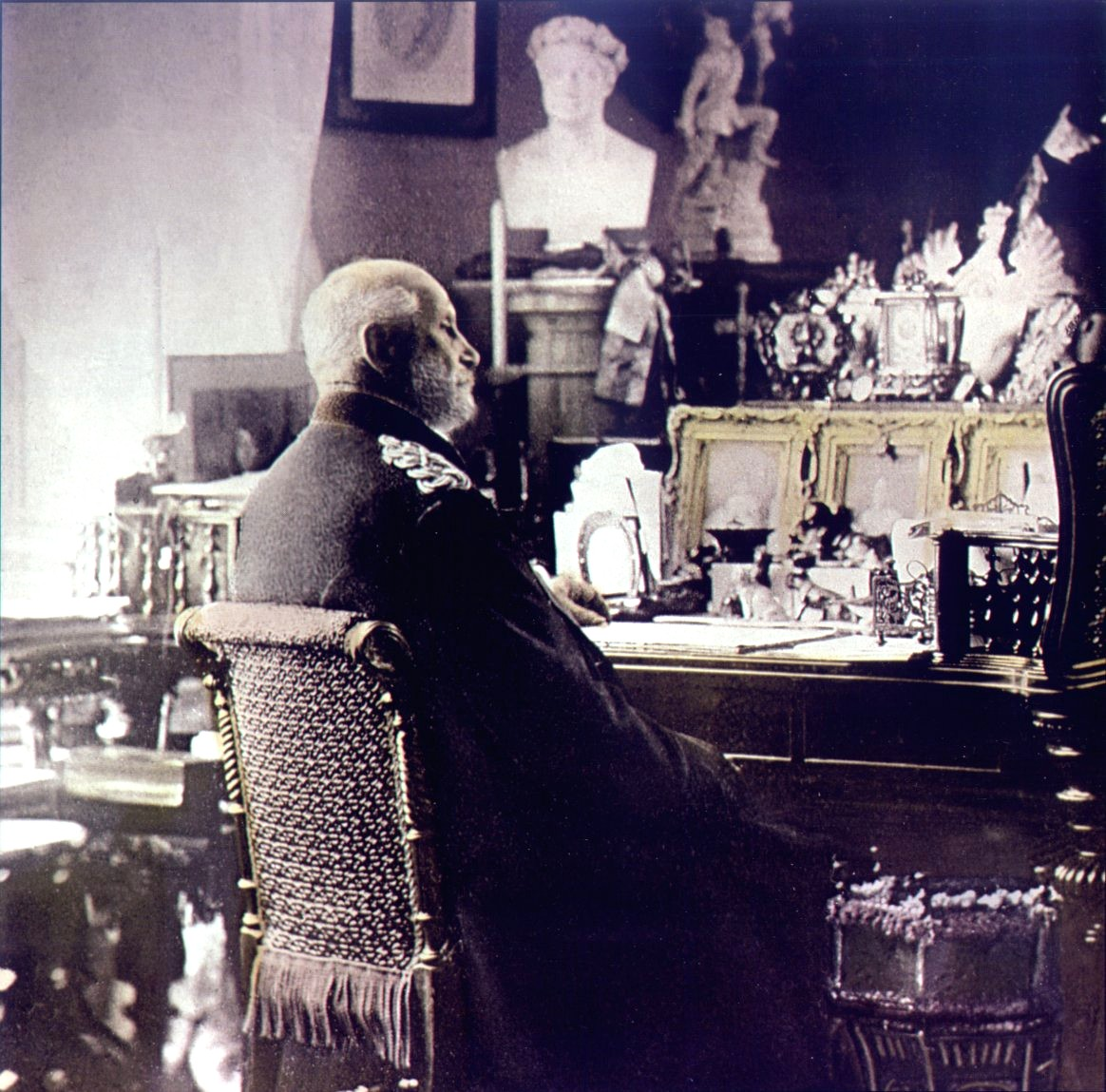
The emperor at his desk, 1880

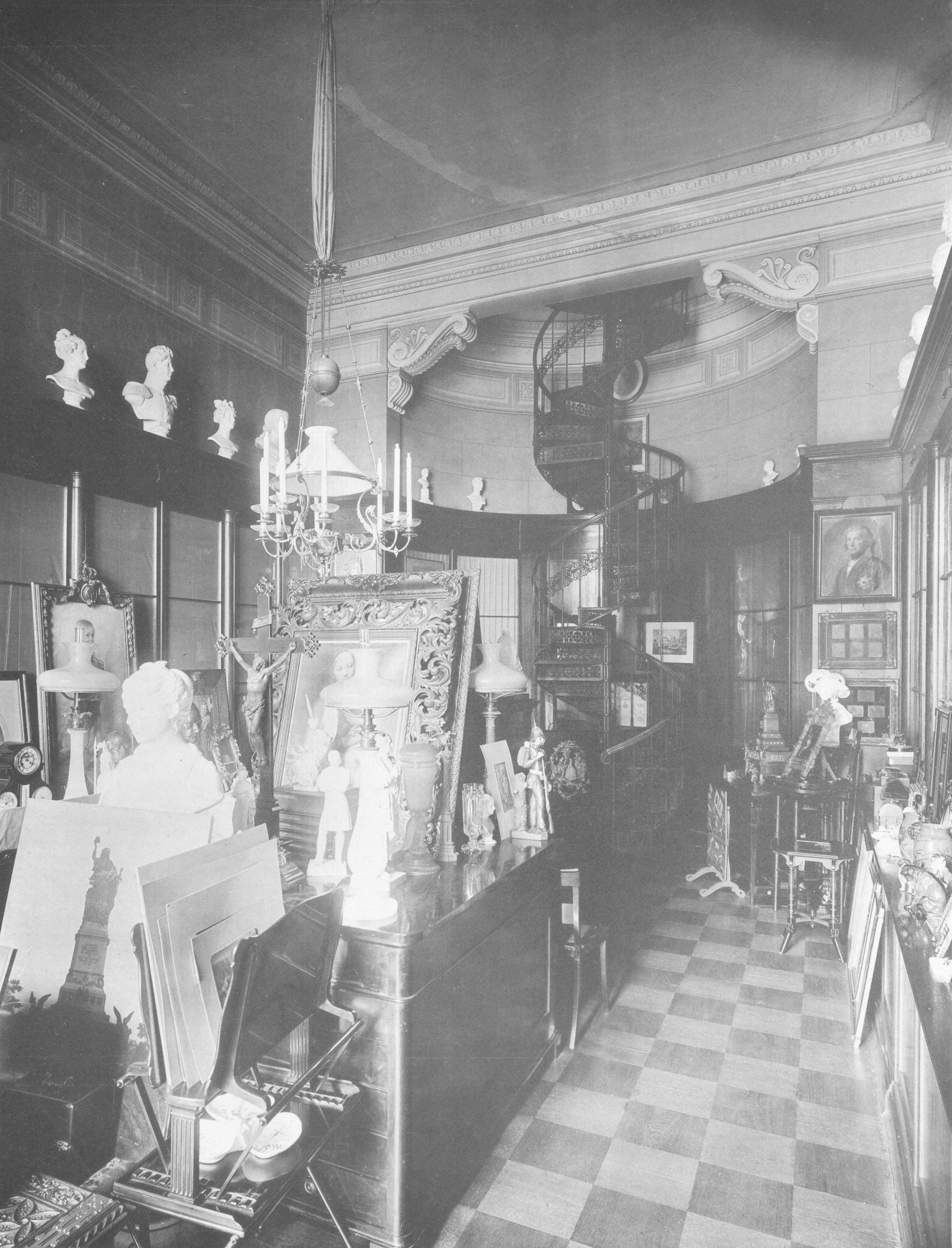
Library

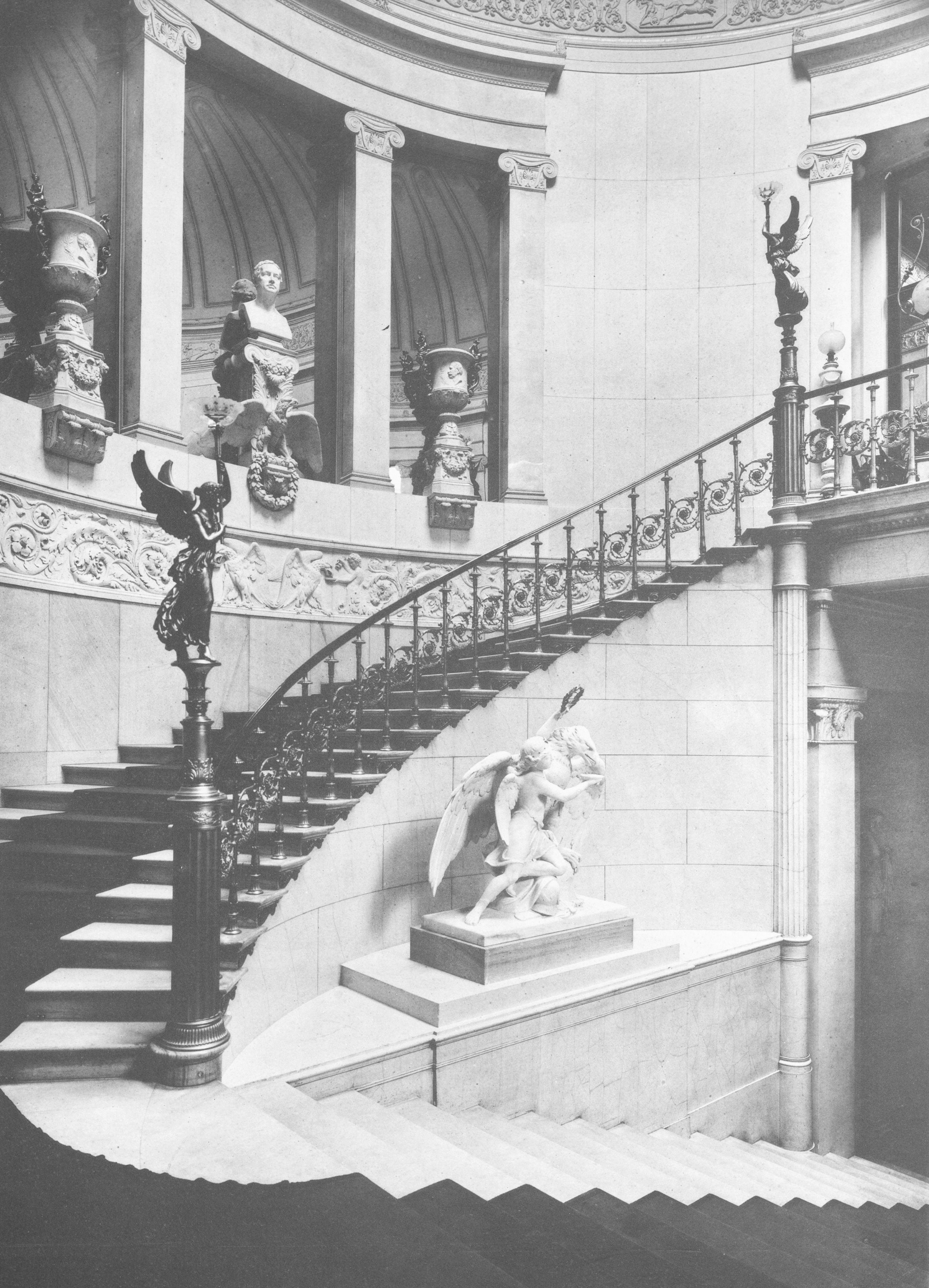
Staircase

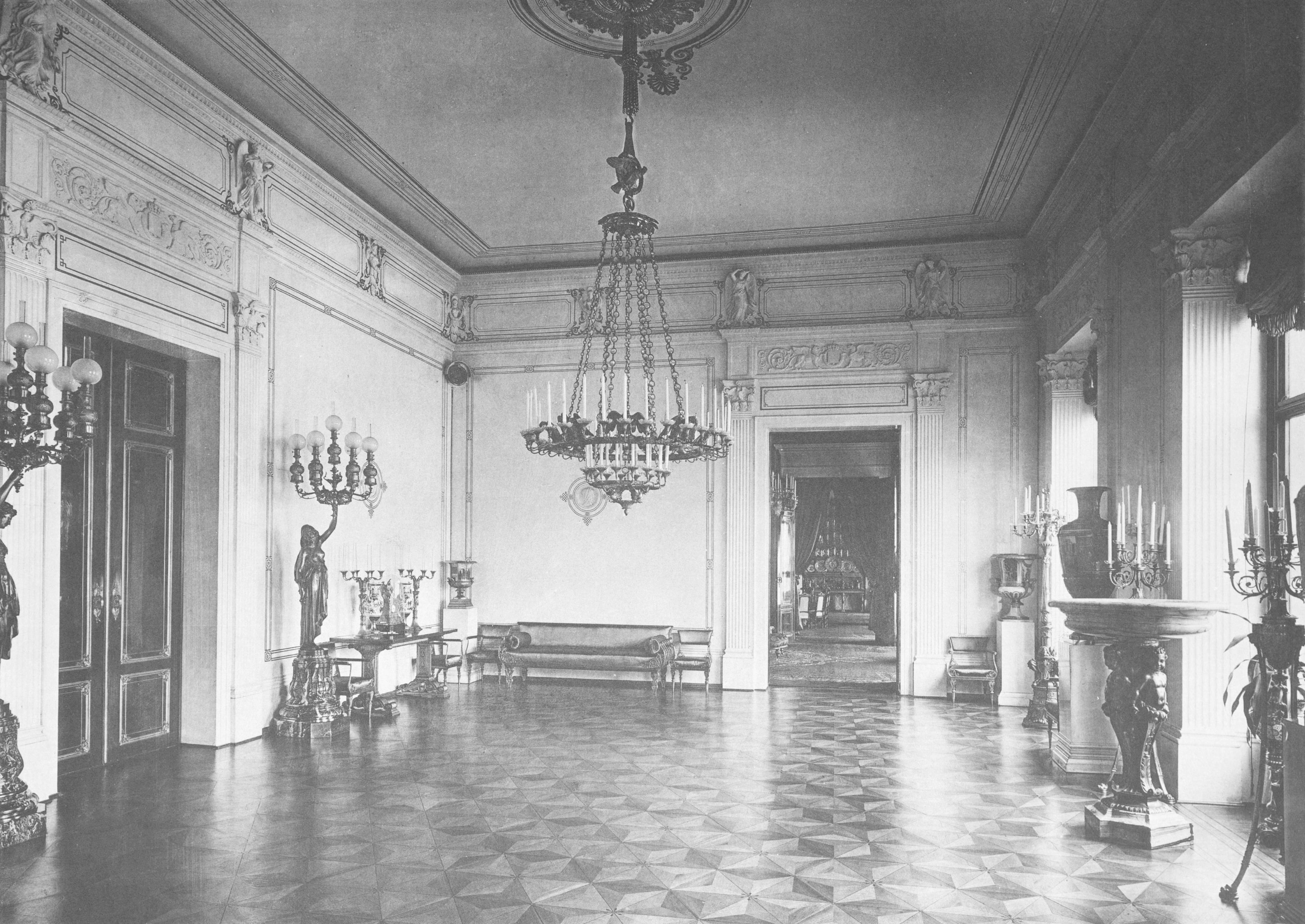
Balcony hall

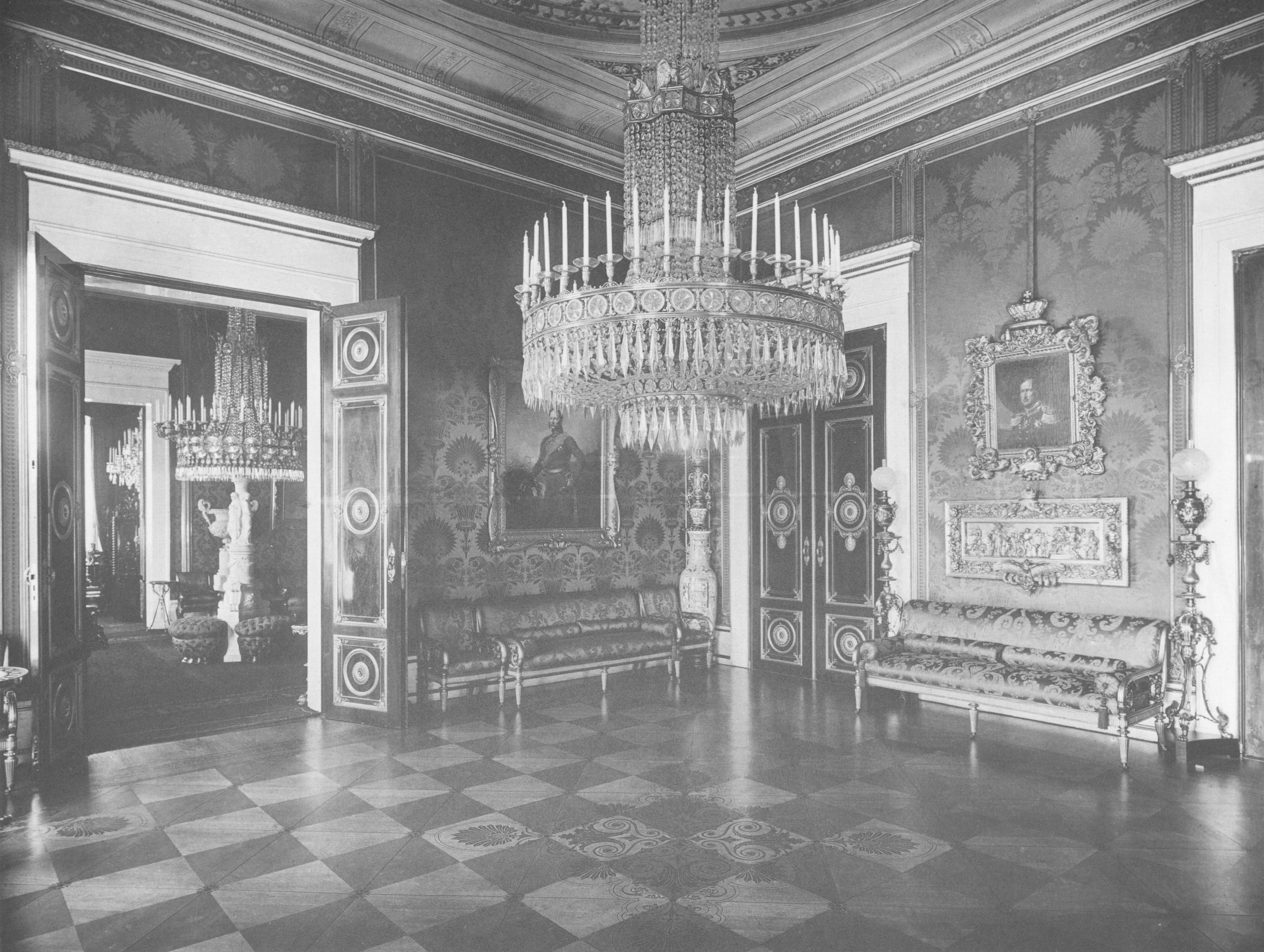
Empress Augusta's audience room

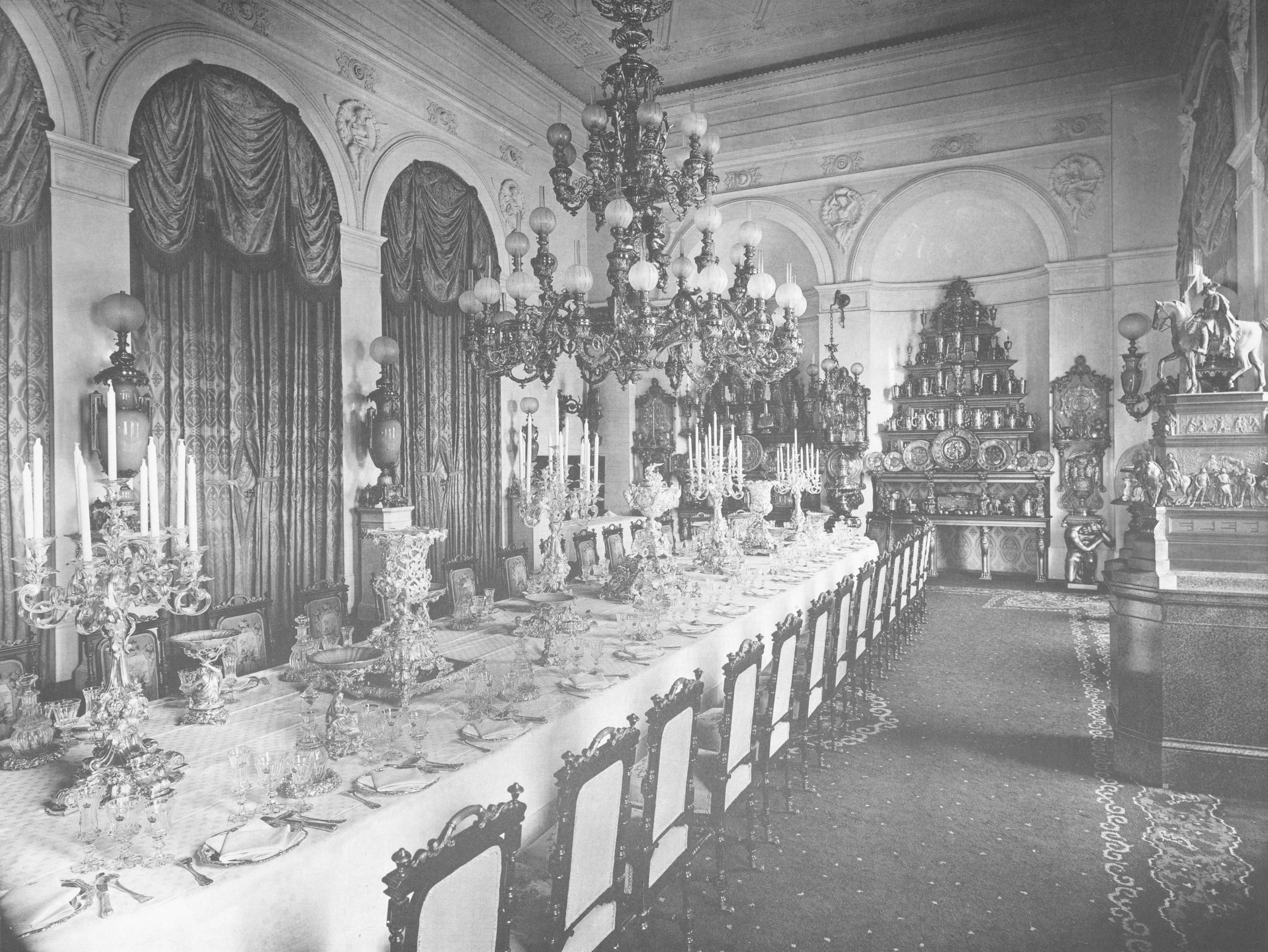
Small dining room

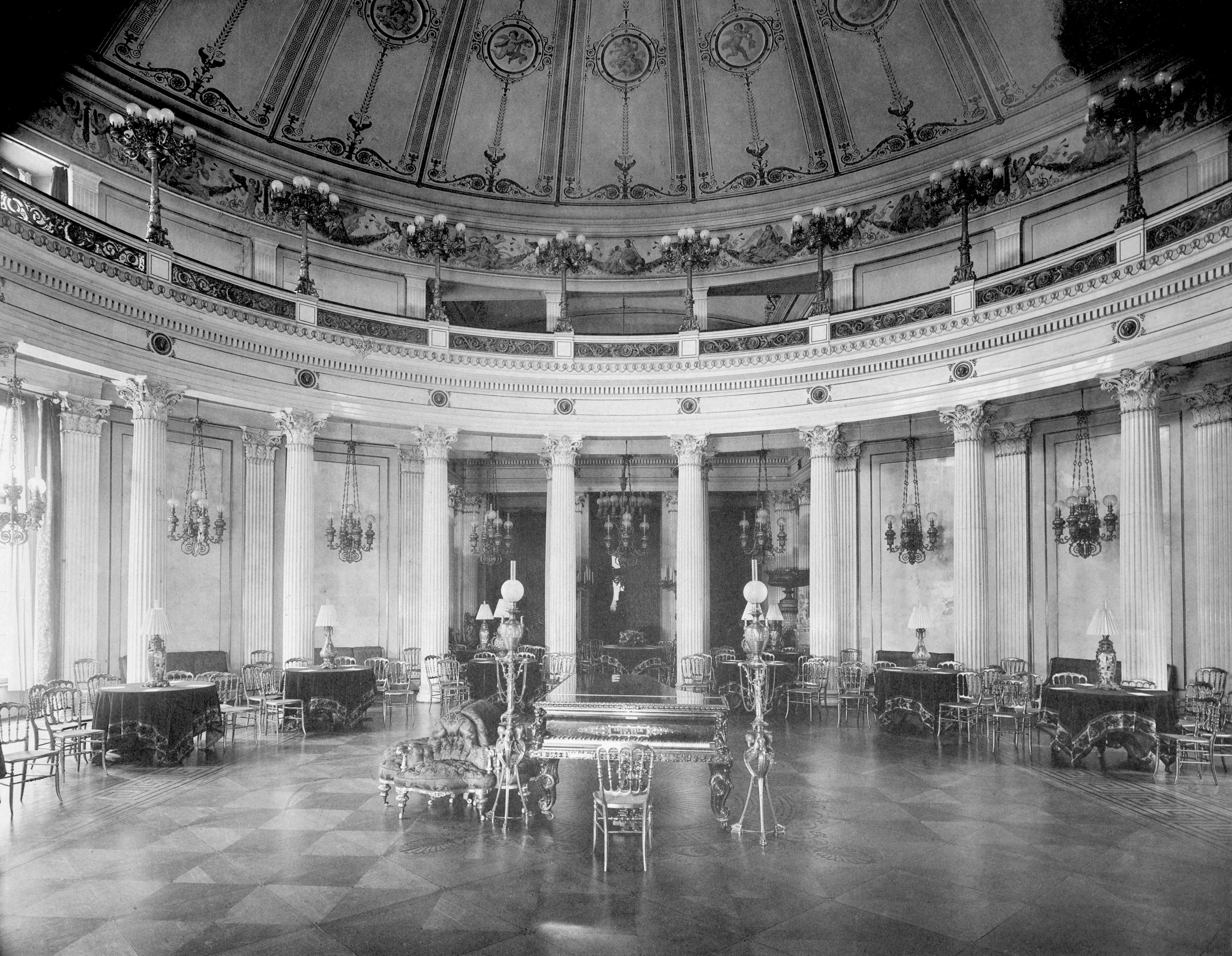
Ballroom

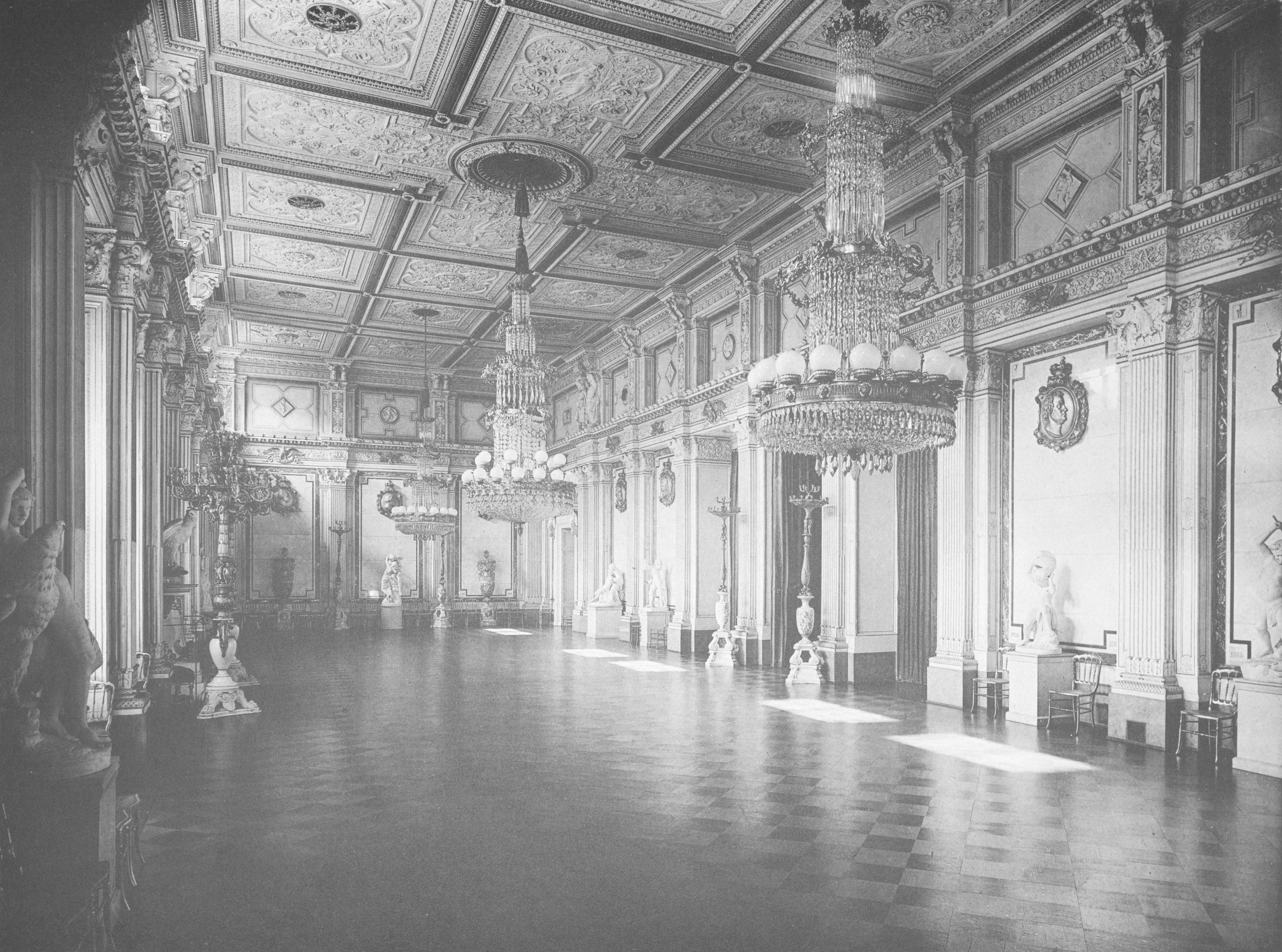
The Eagle Hall

== Bibliography ==
- Helmut Engel. "Das Haus des deutschen Kaisers. Das Alte Palais Unter den Linden". Berlin: Verlagshaus Braun, 2004, ISBN 3935455526.
