= Henry Roxby Beverley =

English actor and low comedian

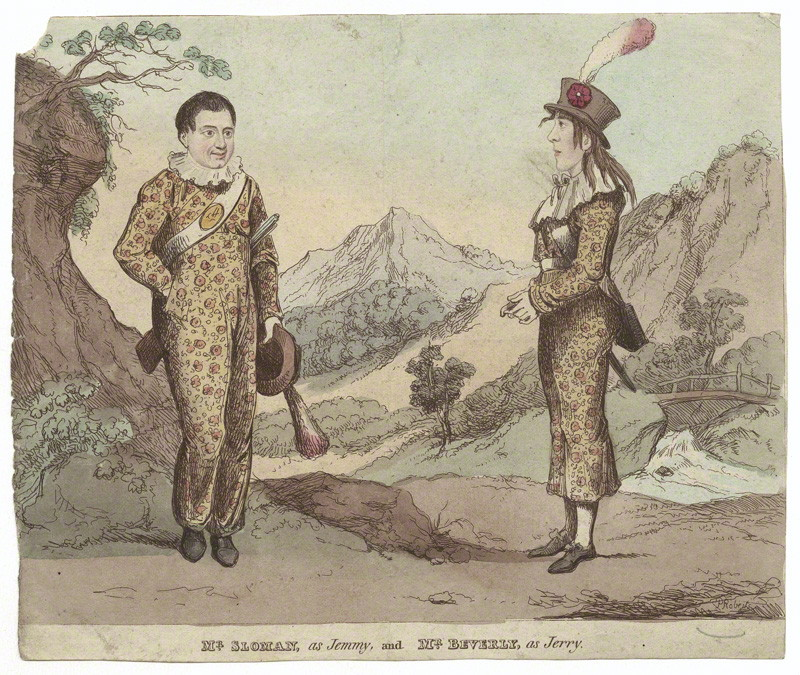
- John Sloman and Henry Roxby Beverley by Piercy Roberts
- Born: 1790
- Died: 1 February 1863 (aged 72–73); London
- Occupation: comedic actor

Henry Roxby Beverley (1790 – 1 February 1863) was an English actor and low comedian.

== Biography ==
He was the son of an actor named Beverley, at one time of Covent Garden Theatre, and subsequently manager of the house in Tottenham Street, known among other names as the King's Concert Rooms, the Regency, the West London, the Queen's, and the Prince of Wales's theatre. The actor Robert Roxby and the scene-painter William Roxby Beverley were his brothers.

He first appeared at the theatre managed by his father, then called the Regency. Full opportunities of practice were afforded him by his mother, and he acquired some reputation as a low comedian.

In October 1838 he replaced John Reeve at the Adelphi, playing in November Newman Noggs in 'Nicholas Nickleby.' He subsequently appeared in Oliver Twist, Jack Sheppard, and other melodramas, and played the principal characters in The Dancing Barber and other farces.

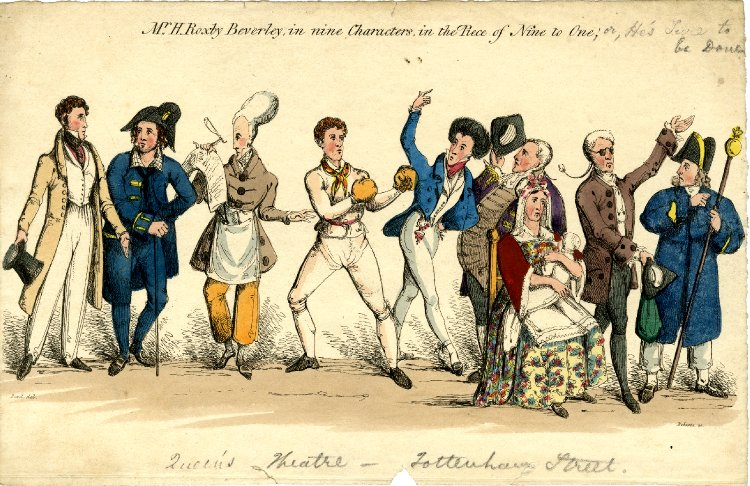
Beverley in Nine to One.

In September 1839, he took the management of the Victoria Theatre. After relinquishing the post, he played in the country theatres, and was for some time manager of the Sunderland theatre and other houses, principally in the north of England, where he was an established favourite. Harry Beverley, as he was generally called, had more unction than often characterises a low comedian, and was a humorous and a sound, though not a brilliant actor.

He died on Sunday 1 February 1863 at 20 Russell Square in London, the house of his brother William Roxby Beverley.
