= Roxby Downs =

Roxby Downs may refer to:

- Roxby Downs, South Australia, a town and a locality
- Roxby Council, formerly Municipal Council of Roxby Downs, a local government area

== See also ==
- Roxby Downs Station
