= Carl Ferdinand Langhans =

Prussian architect

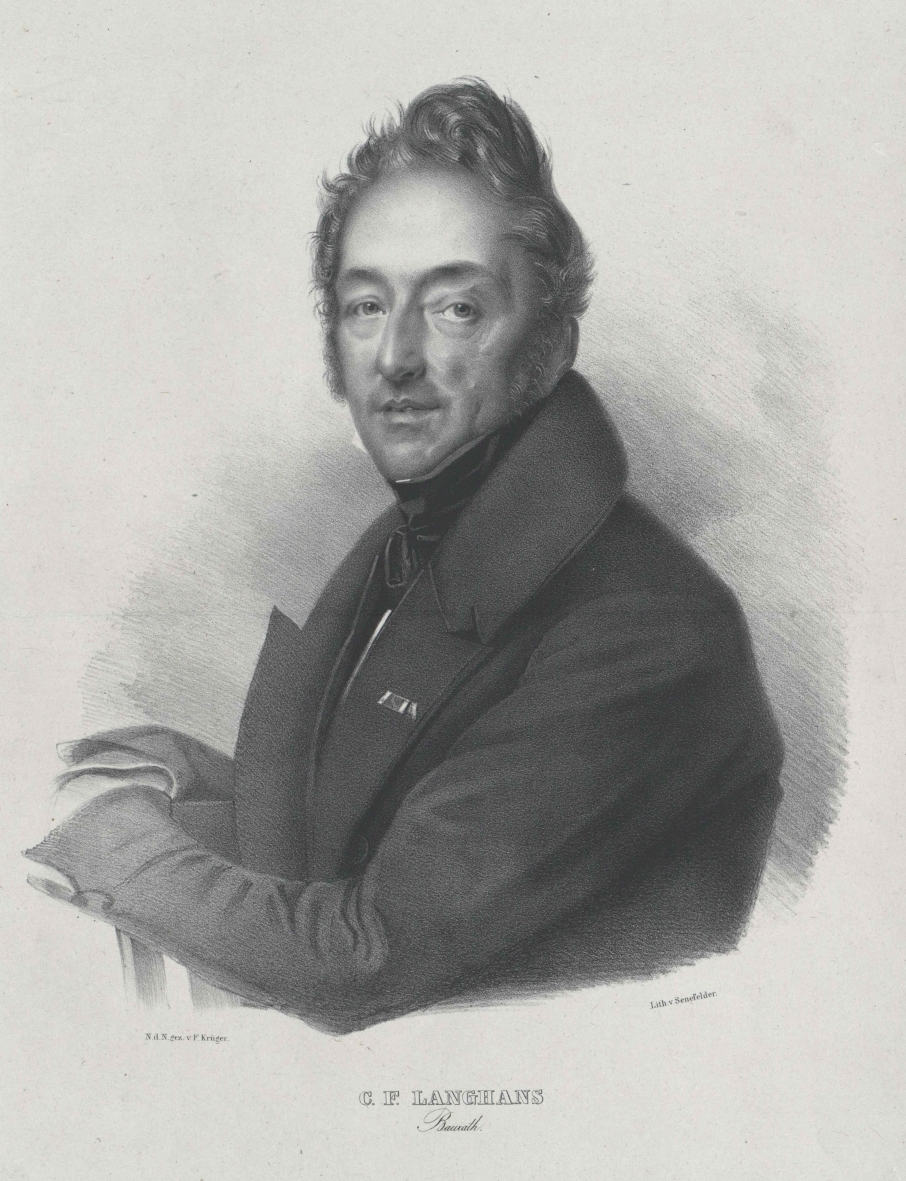
Carl Ferdinand Langhans by Franz Krüger, before 1857.

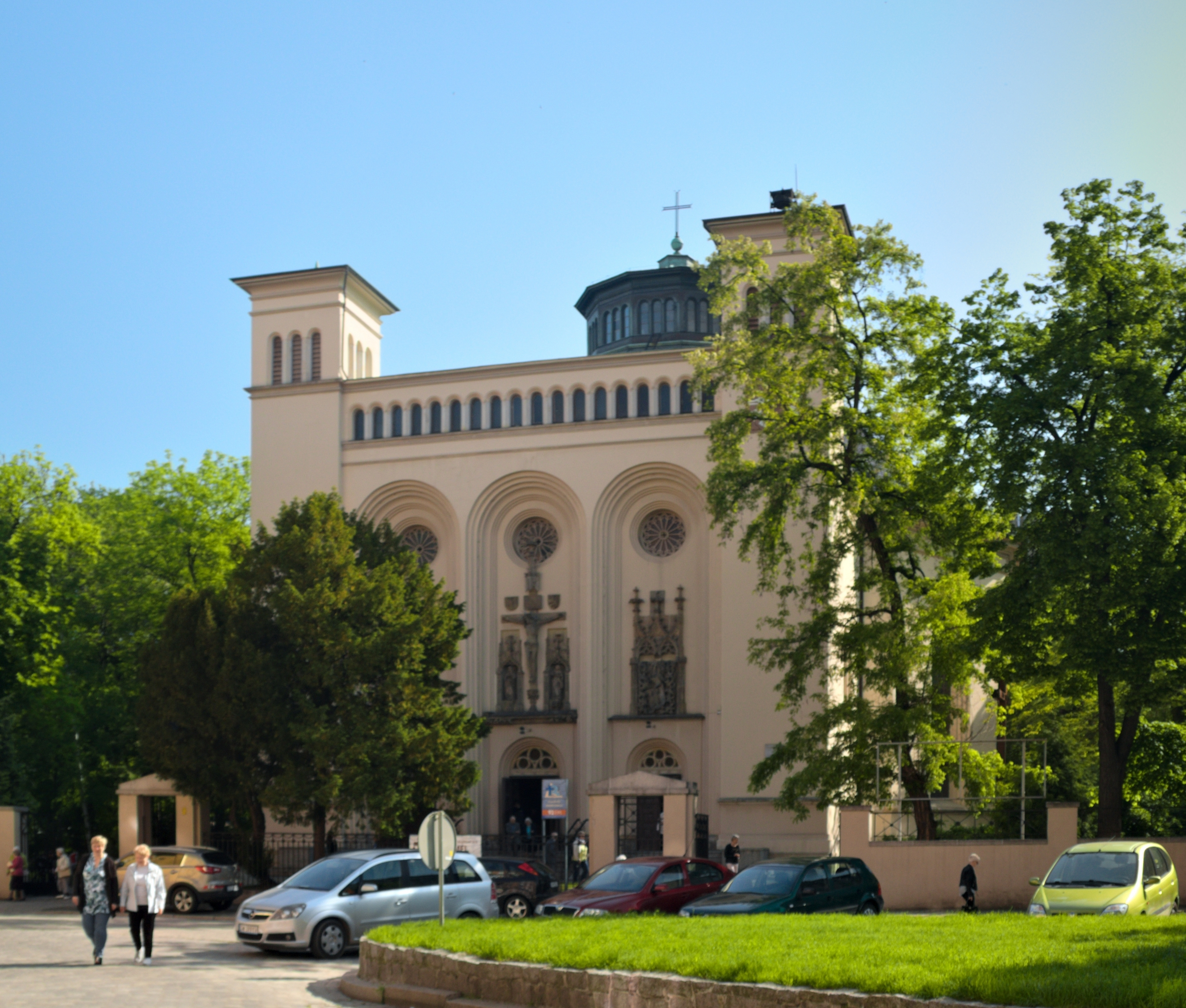
Church of St. Joseph the Protector in Wrocław, Langhans' birthplace, built by him on the site of a medieval church. It was known as the Church of St. Ursula and the Eleven Thousand Virgins until 1946.

Carl Ferdinand Langhans (14 January 1782 – 22 November 1869) was a Prussian architect whose specialty was designing theaters. Born in Breslau, Silesia, Langhans was the son of the architect Carl Gotthard Langhans.

Langhans' designs included the reconstruction of the Berlin State Opera in 1844 after a fire in 1843 and the New Theatre in Leipzig (1865–1868, destroyed by Allied bombing in World War II). Other projects included theaters in Breslau (1838–1841) and Liegnitz (1841–1842), and the Berlin residence (the Old Palace, 1834–1837) of Crown Prince Wilhelm, future German Emperor Wilhelm I. He is also remembered for his innovative pleorama entertainment.

Langhans was a contemporary of Karl Friedrich Schinkel and, for a time, his classmate under David Gilly, to whom he owed his training alongside his father. Trained for his profession by his father and at the school of Friedrich Gilly, he traveled for further training. Appointed building inspector as early as 1797, he was placed on leave as chief court building inspector in 1806 due to the turmoil of the Napoleonic War. He then resigned and traveled to Italy. In Italy, he received a decisive influence on his artistic development through the study of monumental Renaissance buildings.

In Vienna, he worked on the construction of the Theater an der Wien. He had already gained experience in theater construction between 1800 and 1802 during the execution of the Berlin Schauspielhaus, designed by his father. Working as a private architect in Breslau from the autumn of 1808, Langhans was reappointed to the civil service as a building councilor in 1819 and undertook a journey to France and Italy in 1828/29. He executed several notable buildings in his hometown Breslau, most notably the Stock Exchange (1824).

His move to Berlin in 1834 was prompted by the commission to build the Old Palace for Prince Wilhelm (Unter den Linden, destroyed in 1945). He erected, according to a masterfully designed plan, the simple yet distinguished palace — a creation in which Langhans, without being a student of Schinkel, proved himself his equal. He found an opportunity to utilize the specialized knowledge he had gained during the construction of the large theater in Breslau in the expansion of the opera house in Berlin, which had burned down to its outer walls in 1843; he sought to enliven the interior with cheerful Rococo ornamentation. In recognition of the considerable merits Langhan had acquired as a theater architect, he was subsequently commissioned to partly rebuild and partly restore the theaters in Stettin, Liegnitz, Dessau, and Breslau.

Since then, he received commissions for theater buildings in Liegnitz (1841 ff.), Stettin (1846–49), Dessau (1855 ff.), and for the New Theater in Leipzig (1864–68), after having lost out to Schinkel in the 1817 reconstruction of the fire-damaged Berlin Playhouse (desiged by hi father Carl Gotthard Langhans) and to Karl Theodor Ottmer in 1833 for the Königsstädtisches Theater in Berlin. Following the fire that destroyed the Royal Opera in Berlin, built by Knobelsdorff between 1741 and 1743, he oversaw its reconstruction, including a redesign of the auditorium, beginning in 1845. Langhans 's work stands between the waning days of Classicism and the beginnings of Historicism in Berlin architecture. In addition to his building activities, he also engaged extensively with technical inventions and building acoustics, primarily in the context of theaters.

In his Breslau buildings, he incorporated Italianate-Romanesque forms, already related to the Romanesque Revival, into the Church of the Eleven Thousand Virgins (1820–23), a twelve-sided domed building with a pair of facade towers, while Renaissance elements appeared in the Old Stock Exchange (1822–24). In Berlin, however, Langhans felt entirely committed to Schinkel's Classicism in the Old Palace for Prince Wilhelm, skillfully inserting cylindrical rooms (ballroom and staircase) into the floor plan, a feature he also favored in other designs (Breslau, Lodge of Frederick the Golden Scepter, 1816–19). With the same stylistic sensibility, he designed the New Theatre in Leipzig, with a portico above a rusticated ground floor, broad wings, and a harmoniously integrated stage house. For the auditorium, he drew on 18th century concepts.The lodge was placed on a raised horseshoe-shaped ground plan, a design element employed in most of his theater buildings. He achieved particular significance as a theater architect with his 1859 design for the Berlin Victoria Theater, which was unfortunately altered and executed by Eduard Titz: two semicircular auditoriums, one intended as a lodge, the other amphitheater-style as a summer theater with two tiers, define each of the two narrow sides of a rectangular stage house, allowing the building to also be converted into a large ballroom.

Langhans's ideas were further developed and widely disseminated, especially in the theater buildings of the Viennese office of Friedrich Fellner and Hermann Helmer, beginning in 1873. Langhans's most significant monumental building is the Leipzig City Theatre, whose imaginative rear facade, organically integrated with the park, testifies to the architect's creative power despite his advanced age.

Having celebrated the 70th anniversary of his appointment at the beginning of 1867, Carl Friedrich Langhans died in Berlin on November 22, 1869, at almost 89 years of age. His grave is preserved in the Protestant Friedhof III der Jerusalems- und Neuen Kirchengemeinde (Cemetery No. III of the congregations of Jerusalem's Church and New Church) in Berlin-Kreuzberg, south of Hallesches Tor.

In 1817 he married Juliane Seile (d. 1828) in Breslau. In 1857 he married Henriette Winckel (b. 1833), daughter of the beer innkeeper and provisions merchant Friedrich Winckel in Berlin and Charlotte Henriette Wilhelmine Rohde. Both marriages remained childless.

== Works ==
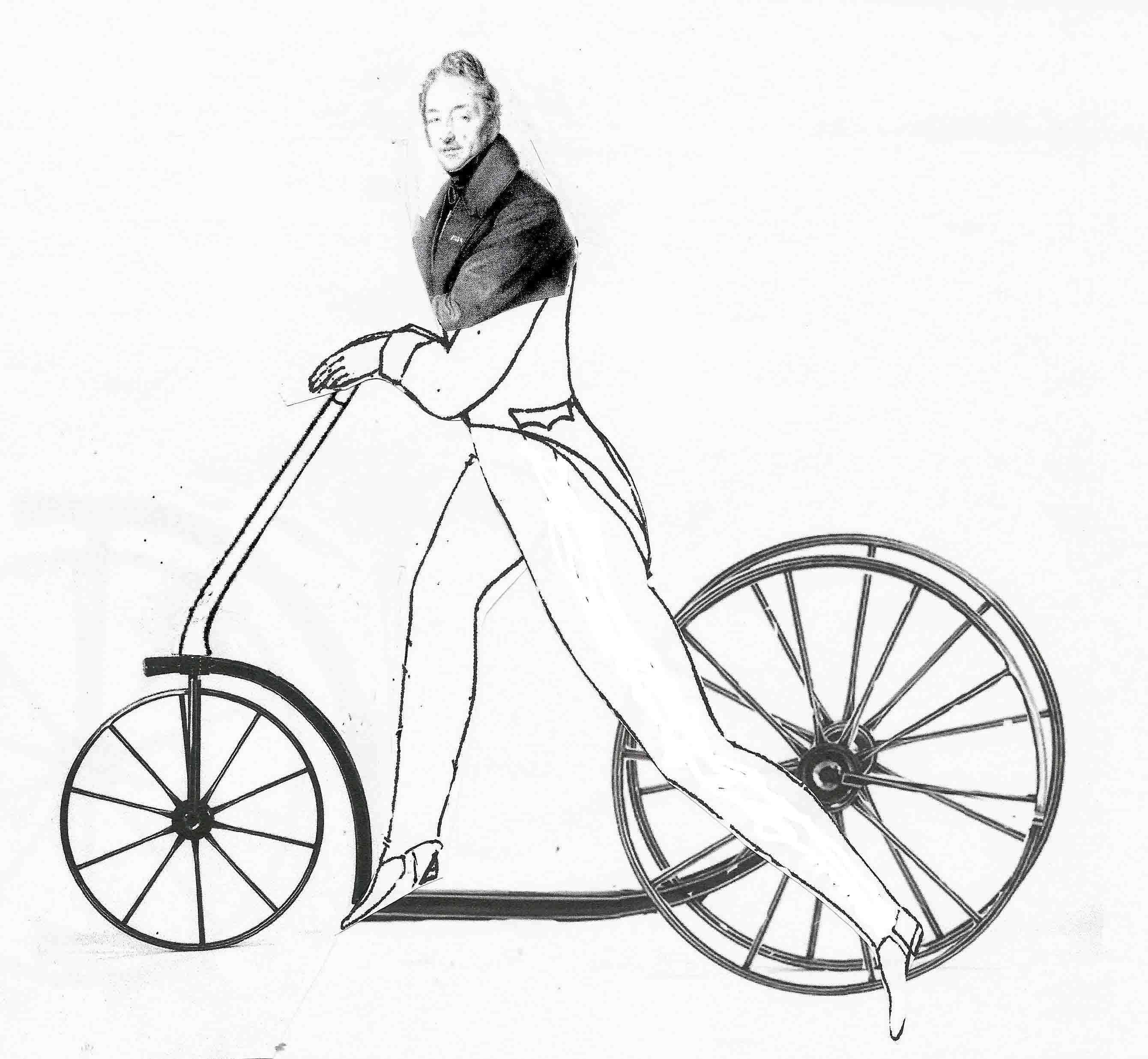
Tretroller, scooter, Breslau 1817, rekonstruktion by H. E. Lessing, 2019

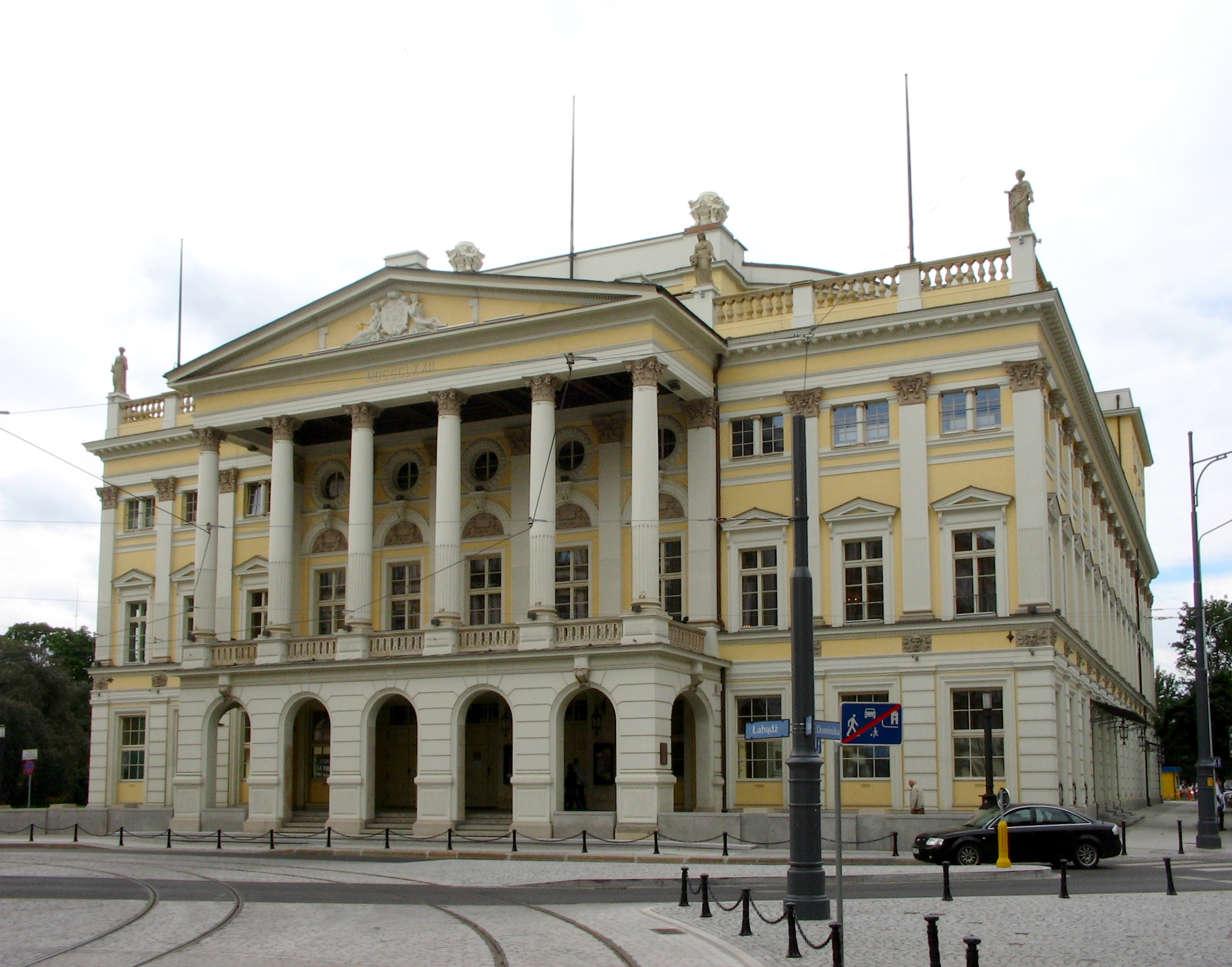
Breslau City Theatre, now Wrocław opera

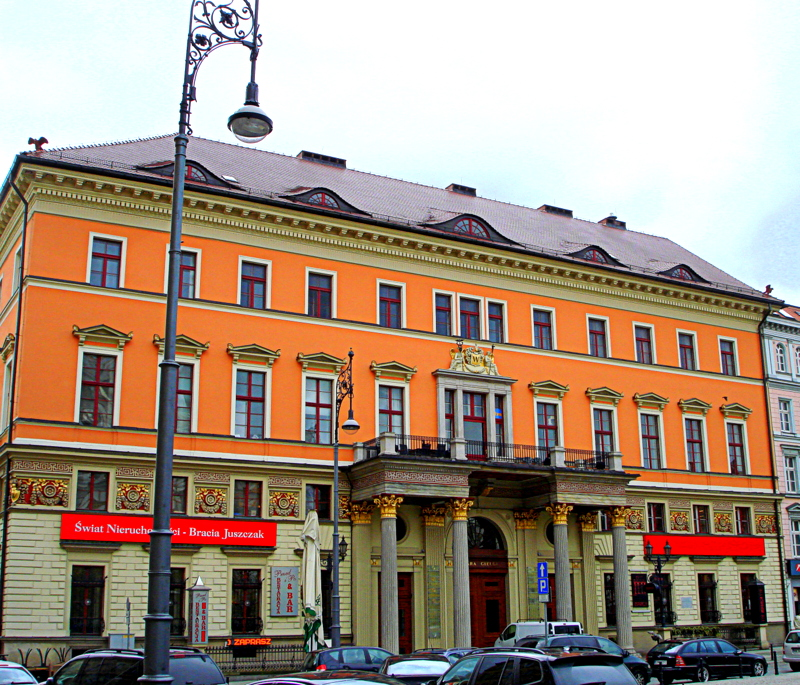
Alte Börse (Old Stock Exchange), Breslau

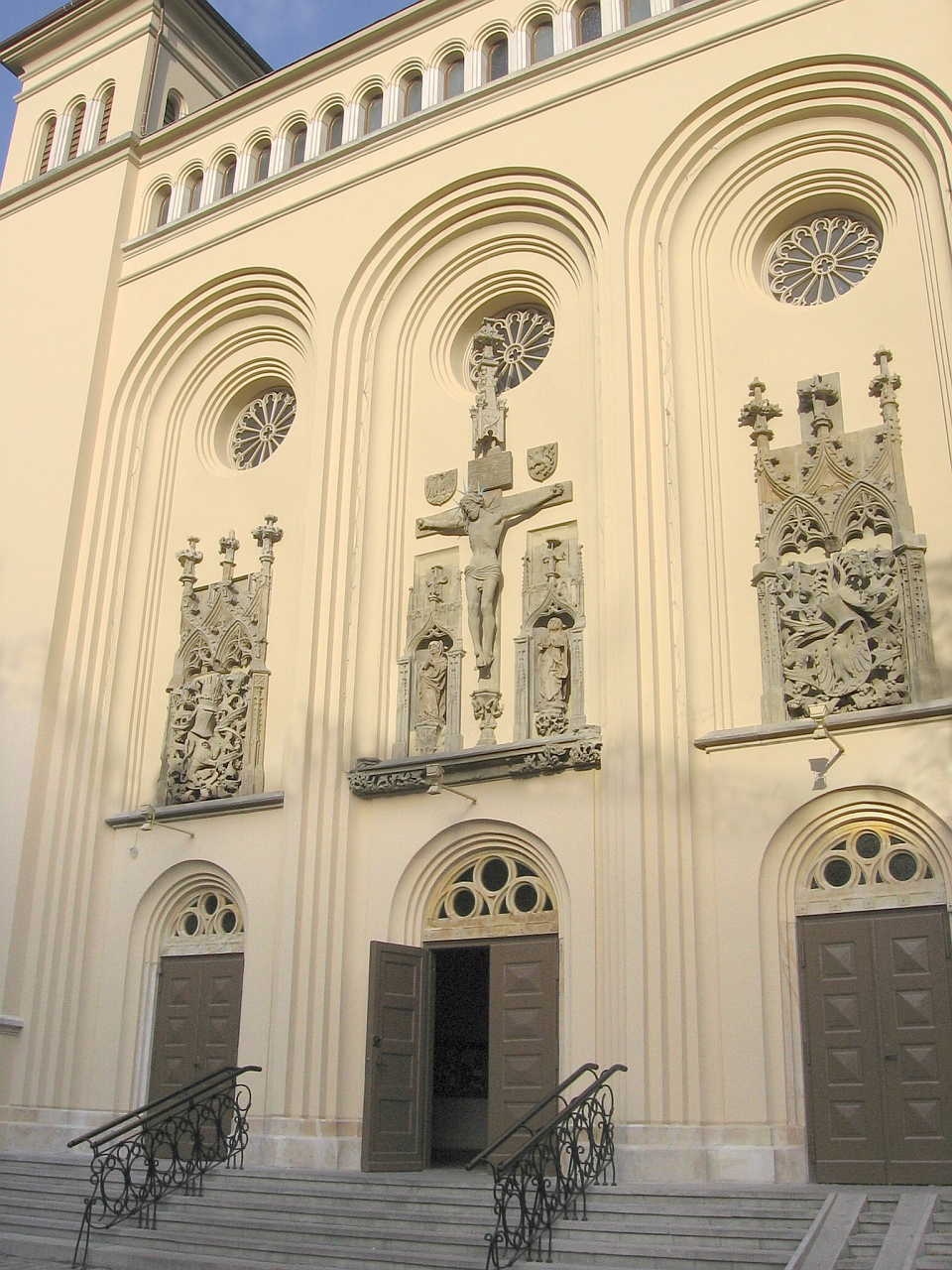
Church of the Eleven Thousand Virgins (Elftausend-Jungfrauen-Kirche), Breslau

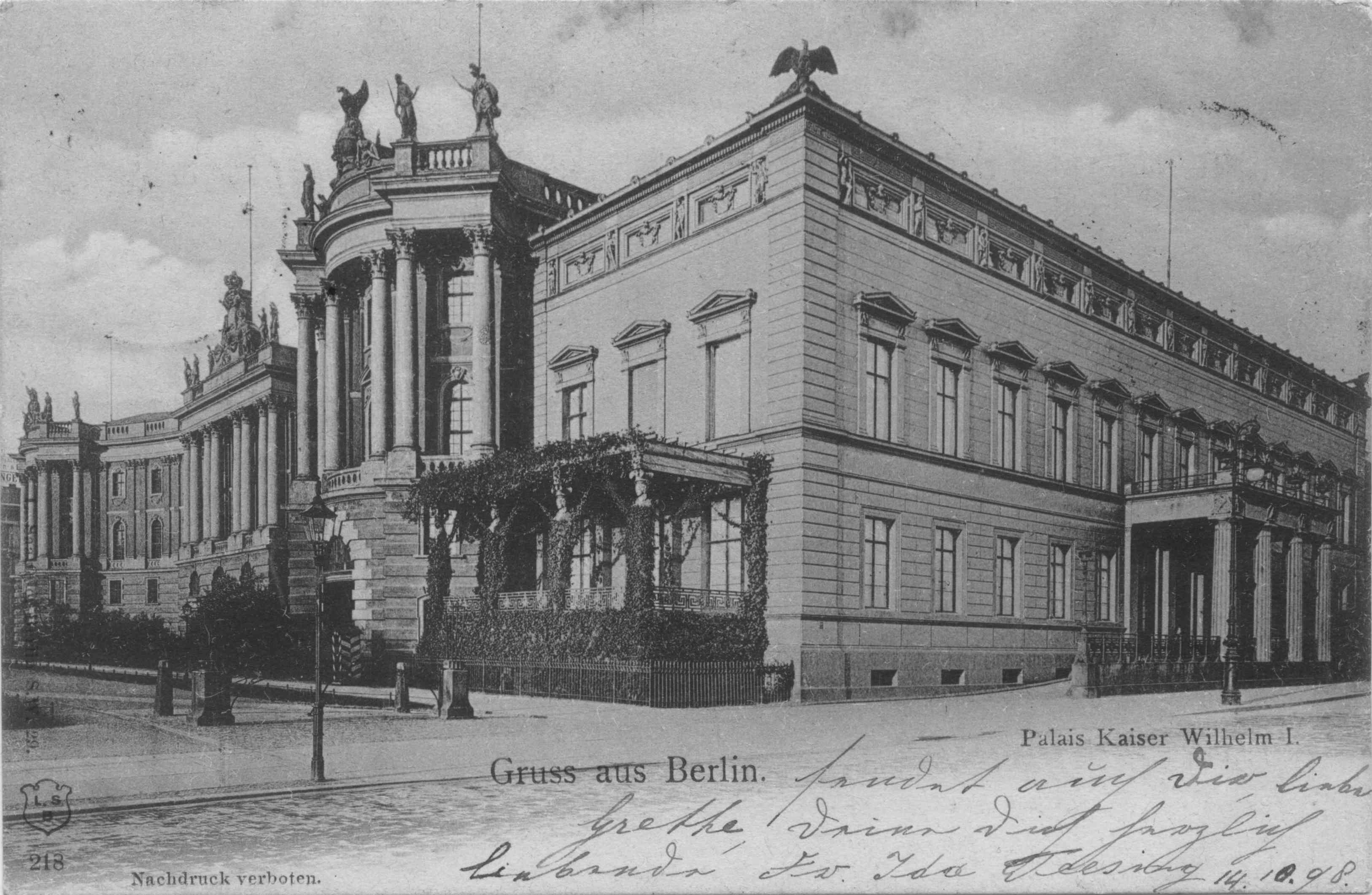
Altes Palais (Old Palace) Berlin, postcard c. 1900

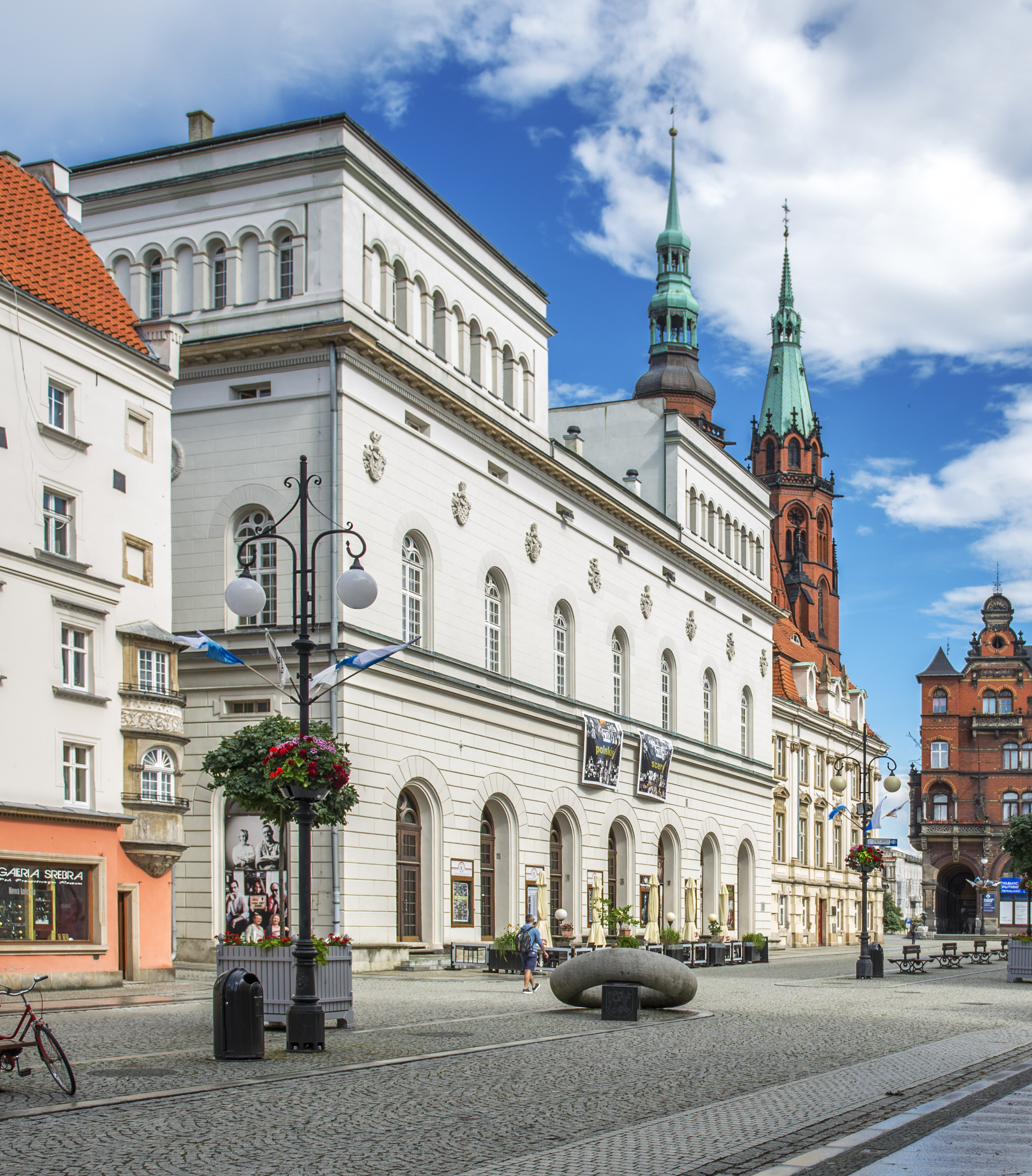
Teatr Modrzejewskiej Legnica, Stadttheater Liegnitz
