= William Roxby Beverly =

English painter

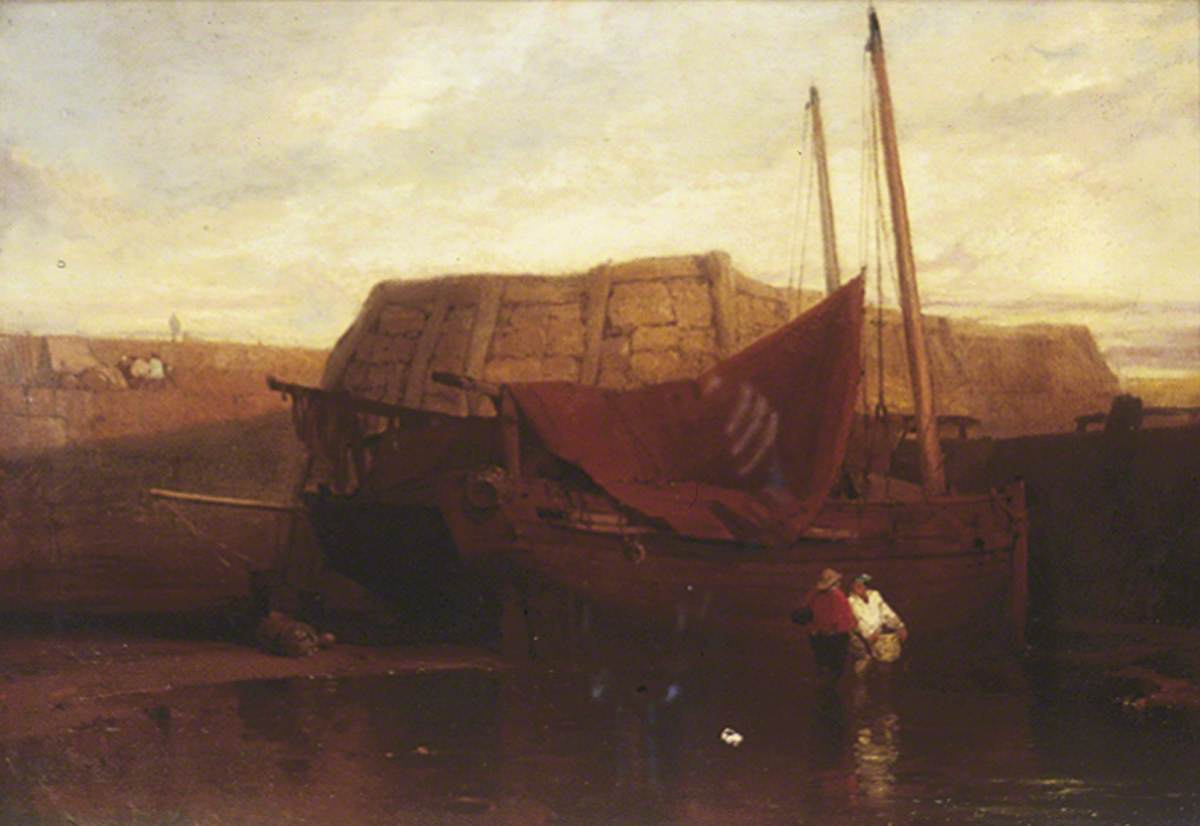
Scarborough Jetty, oils, Leeds Art Gallery

William Roxby Beverly or Beverley (c.1810–1889) was an English theatrical scene painter, known also as an artist in oils and watercolour, and contributor to the large dioramas that were popular attractions in the mid-century. William John Lawrence, writing in the Dictionary of National Biography, considered him second only to Clarkson Stanfield among British scene painters of the 19th century, and describing him as "The last of the old school of one-surface painters, he was proficient in all the mechanical resources of the stage, but was resolutely opposed to the scene ‘builders.’".

As with Stanfield, most of his framed paintings were marine, harbour or beach scenes. He did not consistently sign his paintings (when he did it was usually with initials), which means many paintings are "attributed" to him.

== Early life ==
He born around 1810 at Richmond, Surrey into a theatrical family, one of four sons and one daughter of William Roxby (1765–1842), an actor-manager, whose took the stage name of William Roxby Beverl(e)y (the name deriving from the town of Beverley, for which the family had great affection); he was the youngest, Henry Roxby Beverley, Robert Roxby and Samuel Roxby being elder brothers. Under his father's management of the Theatre Royal, Manchester, in 1830, he painted a notable scene of the "Island of Mist" for the dramatic romance The Ice Witch, or the Frozen Hand, an early play of John Baldwin Buckstone. The effect is thought to have been achieved by the use of gauze.

When in 1831 his father and his brothers Samuel and Robert Roxby took over the control of the Durham circuit, Beverley joined them, and for a few seasons played heavy comedy besides painting scenery. In December 1838 he was engaged to paint the major portion of the scenery for the pantomime of Number Nip (E. L. Blanchard) at Edinburgh, where his main contribution was a moving diorama, depicting scenes from William Falconer's poem The Shipwreck. On 16 September 1839 his brother Harry Beverley assumed the control of the Victoria Theatre in London for a short time, and there he painted for the first time in London, executing the scenery for the pantomime of Baron Munchausen.

In December 1842 Beverly was engaged as principal artist by John Knowles of the Theatre Royal, Manchester; and 1845 he executed an act drop for the new Theatre Royal that remained in use for 25 years. His scenery for the opera Acis and Galatea was seen there in June 1846.

== London engagements ==
Earlier in 1846 Beverly had been engaged by John Medex Maddox as principal artist at the Princess's Theatre, London. In July the scenery for the revival of James Robinson Planché's Sleeping Beauty was from his brush, as were the backgrounds in the Christmas pantomime The Enchanted Beauties of the Golden Castle. In Easter 1847 he provided ingenious transformations for a revival of A Midsummer Night's Dream. While still continuing his association with the Princess's, Beverly worked for the Lyceum Theatre under Lucia Elizabeth Vestris and Charles James Mathews (1847–55), where Planché compared him with the stage mechanician William Bradwell. His outstanding success was in The Island of Jewels of December 1849, when building on the work of Bradwell, he pioneered the transformation scene. His scenery at the Lyceum for Planché's Good Woman in a Wood (Christmas 1852), and for Once upon a time there were two Kings (Christmas 1853), was praised by G. H. Lewes and Henry Morley.

In 1851 Beverly had some hand in the "Great Holy Land Diorama", the largest exhibited up to that time; it was at St George's Gallery, Hyde Park Corner. In the autumn of that year he accompanied Albert Richard Smith to Chamonix, and drew sketches from which he executed his dioramic views for "The Ascent of Mont Blanc", presented by Smith at the Egyptian Hall, Piccadilly, on 15 March 1852. After a time this diorama was expanded by views of the River Rhine, an old pleorama by Carl Wilhelm Gropius that Smith salvaged from a site in Birmingham. While still engaged at the Lyceum Beverly was in 1853 appointed scenic director at the Italian opera, Covent Garden Opera House, in succession to Thomas Grieve. There he was painter for Rigoletto on 16 May, and for many years provided the scenery for the chief operas produced under Frederick Gye. Beverley's association with Drury Lane began under Edward Tyrrel Smith in 1854, and lasted, with few breaks, through the successive managements (Falconer, Chatterton, and Sir Augustus Harris) to 1884. He took on Hawes Craven to assist with the work in both places. Others to whom he gave practical training were Samuel Bough and George Augustus Sala.

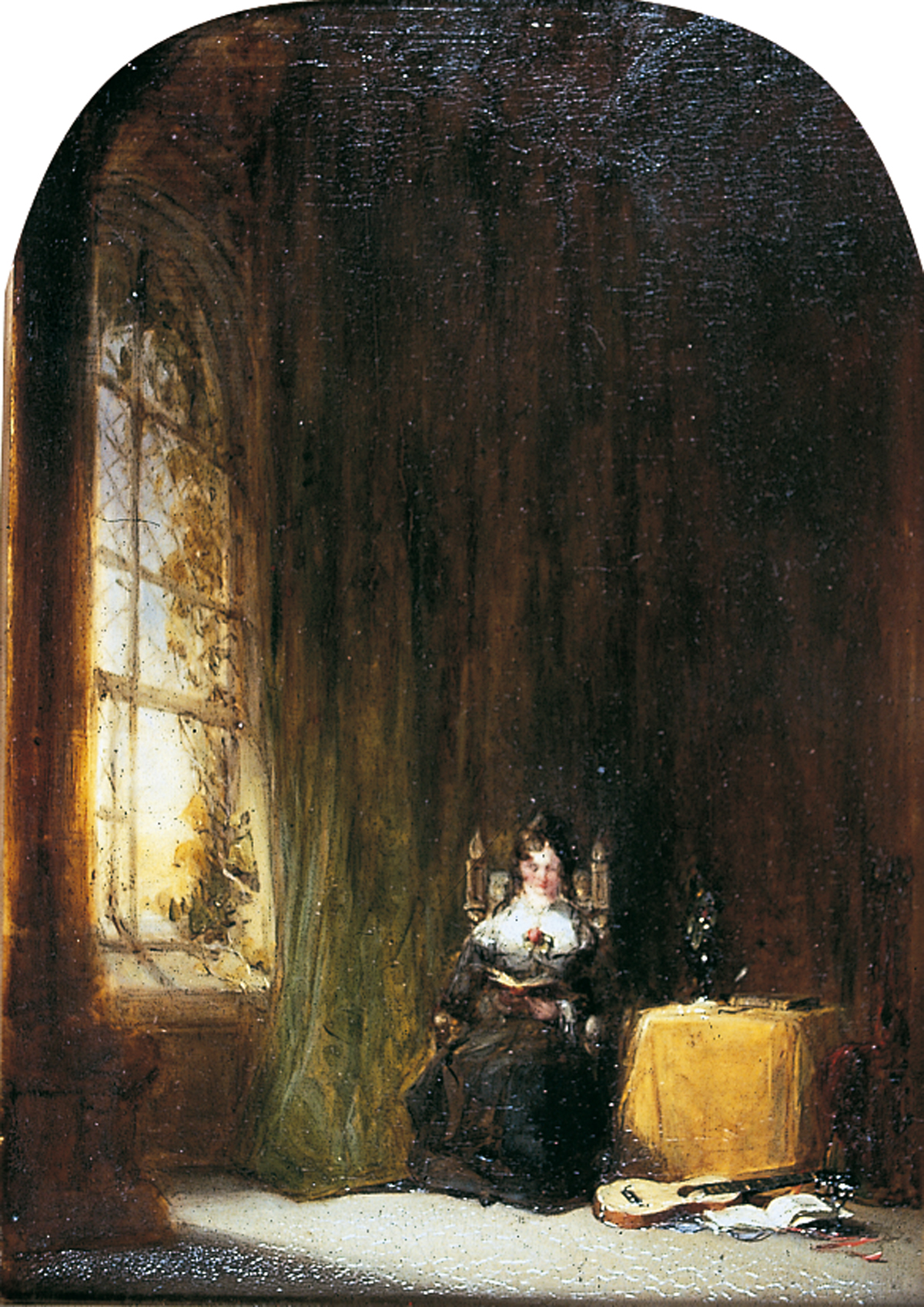
Woman Reading in an Interior, oil painting by William Roxby Beverly

For some years Beverly continued to work for other theatres at the same time. At Christmas 1855 he provided almost all the scenery both at Drury Lane and at Covent Garden. In December 1862 his brush was employed to excellent advantage on the Princess's Theatre pantomime of Riquet with the Tuft. At Drury Lane during the next few years he designs some major Shakespeare revivals, and an elaborate production of Comus. From 1868 to 1879 he apparently worked exclusively for Drury Lane. In October 1868 he painted views of London in Jacobean times for Andrew Halliday's King o' Scots.

== Later years ==
On the death of his brother Robert Roxby in 1866, the "theatres of the old Durham circuit" passed into Beverly's hands; he lost money on them. In September 1873 he provided backgrounds for a spectacular revival of Antony and Cleopatra. In June 1874 he painted scenery for Michael William Balfe's opera Il Talismano, and a little later for Lohengrin. In September 1876 he was responsible for the scenery for Richard III at Drury Lane, in October 1880 for Mary Stuart (Lewis Strange Wingfield from Schiller) at the Royal Court Theatre, and in the following December for the Covent Garden pantomime of Valentine and Orson.

In March 1881 Beverly provided the scenery for Michael Strogoff (Henry James Byron) at the Adelphi Theatre. In this play still-life accessories were, for the first time on the British stage, harmonised with the background, after the manner of the French cycloramas. At the same house in March 1883 he painted for the Storm-beaten of Robert Williams Buchanan, and in the October following for the opera of Rip Van Winkle at the Royal Comedy Theatre.

In 1884 Beverley painted a panorama of the Lakes of Killarney, which was an integral feature of George Fawcett Rowe's play of The Donagh at the Grand Theatre, Islington. Besides working in the same year for the Savoy Theatre and the Princess's he furnished some of the scenery for Whittington and his Cat at Drury Lane at Christmas, and next year was one of the painters for Aladdin there.

After 1884 failing eyesight led Beverly into enforced idleness. He died at Hampstead on Friday, 17 May 1889. At the Haymarket Theatre on 30 July 1890 a morning performance was given for the benefit of his widow.

== Works ==
Beverly also painted to exhibit, with watercolour being his preferred medium. He showed at the Royal Manchester Institution, in the 1820s and 1830s, and again in later life. Between 1865 and 1880 he exhibited 29 pictures at the Royal Academy, most of them seascapes. His last picture seen there was Fishing Boats going before the Wind: Early Morning, was exhibited in 1880. His work has been compared to that of Richard Parkes Bonington.

William Roxby Beverley is believed, from the fact that he was living in the right area of London at the right time, to be the William Beverley who was the first to discover a magic knight's tour of the chessboard. He sent it to his friend the mathematician Henry Perigal in 1847, who in turn sent it to the editors of the Philosophical Magazine where it was published in August 1848.
