= Pleorama =

The best-known pleorama was a 19th-century moving panorama entertainment where the viewers sat in a rocking boat while panoramic views on painted canvas rolled past. The word has sometimes been used for other entertainments or innovations.

Architect Carl Ferdinand Langhans introduced a pleorama in Breslau in 1831 with scenes of the Bay of Naples on both sides of 24 "voyagers" sitting in a wooden boat floating in a pool of water. The illusion was enhanced by light and sound effects: the boatman singing, Vesuvius erupting. Writer/artist August Kopisch was involved in designing the hour-long show.

Carl Wilhelm Gropius, who had a diorama exhibit in Berlin, took over management of this pleorama in 1832, and there was also a pleorama of a journey along the river Rhine.

The Swiss writer Bernard Comment, among others, has pointed out the similarities between Langhans' pleorama and the ambitious mareorama at the 1900 Paris Exhibition.

A similar idea was used for a London padorama in 1834. Spectators were seated in railway carriages to watch a moving panorama of scenes visible from the Liverpool and Manchester Railway.

In 1850s Finland the name pleorama was given to shows which presented historic scenes and panoramic views using glass, but posters for these do not mention anything resembling Langhans' boat concept.

== Etymology ==
The name pleorama was coined from Greek elements. Like other 19th century novelties ending in -orama - diorama and cyclorama, for instance - the second half of the word has the sense of 'something seen'. The pleo- part here is understood to come from a Greek word meaning 'float' which applies to Langhans' boat in water idea. Pleorama is also the 21st century name of an innovative "floating house".

== See also ==
- Myriorama
- Panoramic painting
