= Robert Roxby (actor) =

English actor and stage manager

- Born: c. 1809
- Died: 25 July 1866
- Occupations: Actor, stage manager
- Parent: William Roxby Beverley (father)

Robert Roxby (c. 1809 – 25 July 1866) was an English actor and stage manager.

== Life ==
Roxby was a son of William Roxby Beverley, an actor-manager who was for a time manager of the theatre in Tottenham Street in London. The actor Henry Roxby Beverley and the scene-painter William Roxby Beverley were his brothers.

After performing in provincial theatres, Roxby appeared in London in 1839 at St James's Theatre, under the management of John Hooper. In 1843, at the Theatre Royal, Manchester, he played many leading parts in comedy. He was for some years in London at the Lyceum or at Drury Lane, and was during eleven years stage manager at Drury Lane.

He acted much with Charles Mathews, and was with him and Madame Vestris at the Lyceum from 1847 to 1855. This was the best part of his career. In October 1855 he played, at Drury Lane, Rob Royland to the Mopus of Charles Mathews, in Married for Money, an adaptation of John Poole's The Wealthy Widow. In March 1858 he was the original Lord George Lavender in Joseph Stirling Coyne's The Love Knot. He played, in March 1860, an original part in Edward Fitzball's Christmas Eve, or the Duel in the Snow, and in November 1861 was the original Hardess Cregan in H. J. Byron's burlesque Miss Eily O'Connor.

At the Princess's Theatre, London as stage manager, on 23 January 1863, he was seriously burnt in extinguishing a fire on the stage, in which two girls in the pantomime lost their lives. On the first appearance in London of Walter Montgomery at the Princess's as Othello, in June 1863, Roxby was Roderigo. At the close of the year he was again at Drury Lane, where, In April 1864, he played in An April Fool by William Brough and Andrew Halliday.

On 25 July 1866, after a long illness, he died in London at the house of his brother William Roxby Beverley. He is buried at Kensal Green Cemetery, London.

== Critic's assessment ==
The drama critic Joseph Knight wrote: "Roxby was a capable stage manager and, in spite of some hardness of style and weakness of voice, a respectable actor in light-comedy parts.
