= Robert Roxby (songwriter) =

English songwriter and poet (1767–1846)

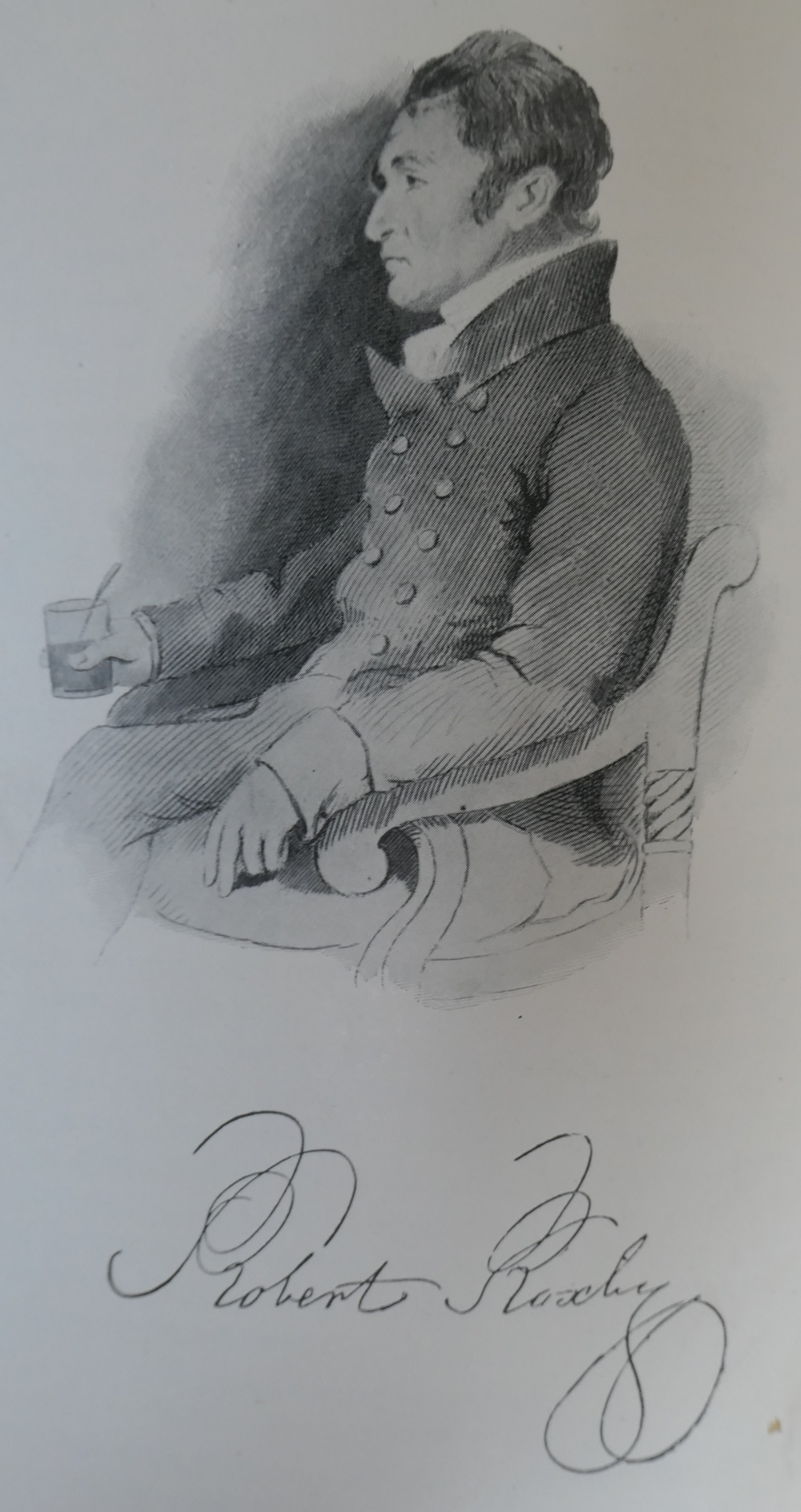
Robert Roxby

Robert Roxby (1767 – 30 July 1846) was an English clerk by profession, and amateur angler, songwriter and poet. He regularly contributed to collections of poems and songs, most prolifically in The Fisher's Garland from around 1823 to 1851.

== Life ==
Robert Roxby was born in 1767 at Needless Hall, the name of the farm (grid reference NZ112864) about 1 mile east of Hartburn, and 6 miles west of Morpeth. In 1828 it was occupied by Thomas Brice and in 1855 by William Howey.

His father died when he was very young, and he was put into the trusteeship of local farmer Gabriel Goulburn of Redesdale, to be trained in agriculture.

He remained there until about 1792, when the Goulburn’s business failed and the sum of money left in trust by his father was all lost. At this point in his life Robert Roxby had to turn to commerce and business to earn his livelihood. He worked as a clerk firstly at the bank of Sir William Loraine of Kirkhale, 6th Baronet, (Sir William Loraine & Co), which failed, leaving Roxby without an income. He quickly found a similar position with another bank, that of Sir Matthew White Ridley, 3rd Baronet (Sir Matthew White Ridley & Co.), also of Newcastle, at which he eventually rose to the position of chief clerk.

== Later life ==
He died 30 July 1846, at the age of 79 years, and was buried at St Paul's (now disused) burial ground, in Westgate Hill General Cemetery, Arthur's Hill, Newcastle upon Tyne.

== Friendship ==
He became friendly with Thomas Doubleday and they eventually became almost inseparable, despite their differences in age (Roxby was by far the elder). The pair of them spent a considerable time fishing on the River Coquet, Rede and other Northumberland rivers.

== Works ==
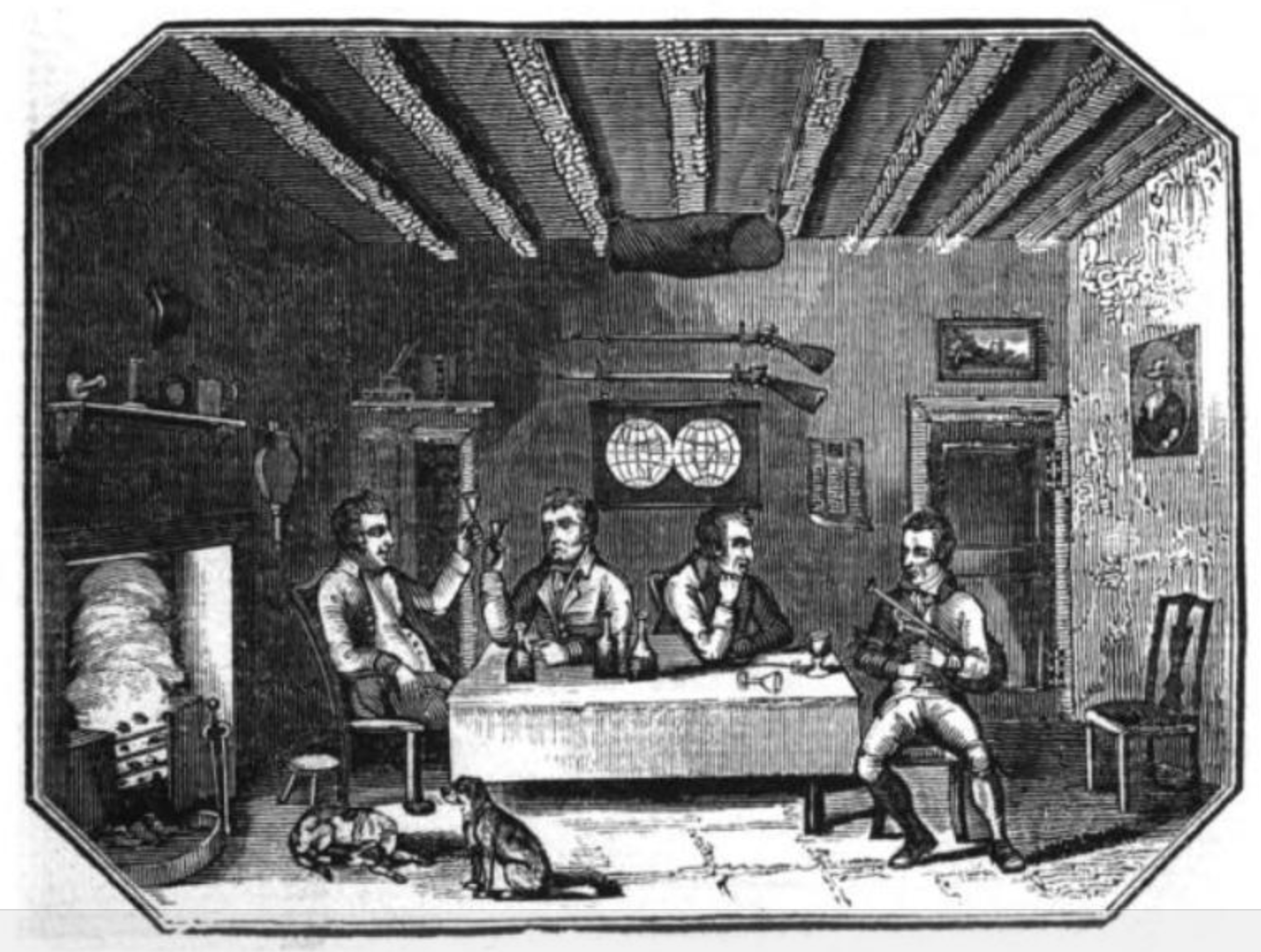
Thomas Bewick engraving in The Lay of the Reedwater Minstrel (1809)

These include :-

- "The Lay of the Reedwater Minstrel. illustrated, with Notes, Historical and Explanatory, Addressed to Matthew Forster of Broomyholme, Esq. By a Son of Reed" Newcastle: D. Akenhead & Sons, 1809. (NOTE – this actually refers to the River Rede)
- The Fisher's Garland for 1821, or "A new song", to the tune of "The Miller o’ Dron" (signed "Newcastle 5th April 1821")
- The Fisher's Garland for 1823. or "Coquet Side", sung to the tune of "The Hows o’ Glenorchie" – was printed as a broadsheet, and 196 copies were for Emerson Chamley, printer, publisher and bookseller of Bigg Market, Newcastle on 20 December 1828 – the first 3 verses were by Roxby, the last three by Thomas Doubleday.
- The Fisher's Garland for 1824, or "The Auld Fisher's Welcome to Coquet Side"
- The Fisher's Garland for 1825, or "The Auld Fisher’s farewell to Coquet", sung to the tune of "Gramachree" - 296 copies were printed for Emerson Chamley on 26 March 1825 and 100 copies presented to the Robert Roxby, (even though it was a jointly written piece).
- The Fisher's Garland for 1826, or "The Coquet for ever", sung to the tune of "Oh, whistle and Til come to you, my lad" – 400 copies were printed for Emerson Chamley on 15m April 1826.
- The Fisher’s Garland for 1828
- The Fisher's Garland for 1832, or "The Auld Fisher's Invitation to his Friend in Newcastle"
- The Fisher's Garland for 1841
- The Fisher’s Garland for 1851, "The Auld Fisher's Visit to North Tyne" (which first appearing in "Richardson's Table Book" as an "Epistle to Robert Boyd, Esq") was written by Roxby alone, but was transformed into a Garland by Thomas Doubleday in a collection which he published in 1852 under the title of "The Coquetdale Fishing Songs, Now First Collected and Edited by a North-Country Angler"
- The Auld Fisher’s Last Wish to the tune "My love is newly listed"

== See also ==
- Geordie dialect words
- Thomas Doubleday
