= Andamooka =

Andamooka may refer to:

- Andamooka, South Australia, a town and locality
- Andamooka Opal, a gemstone presented to Queen Elizabeth II
- Andamooka Station, a pastoral lease in South Australia
- Andamooka Airport, an airport in South Australia
