= Cal the Stoner's Outdoor Intricarved Stone Sculpture Studio =

Open-air gallery in Andamooka, South Australia

Cal the Stoner's Outdoor Intricarved Stone Sculpture Studio is an open-air gallery located in Andamooka, South Australia. It exhibits stone sculptures carved by artist Cal Prohasky, including The Andamooka Tiger, a life-sized tiger carved from Grampians sandstone set with opals.

The sculptures are created using the "intricarved" technique developed by Prohasky, in which pieces of stone are individually carved to create up to 2,000 interlocking segments.

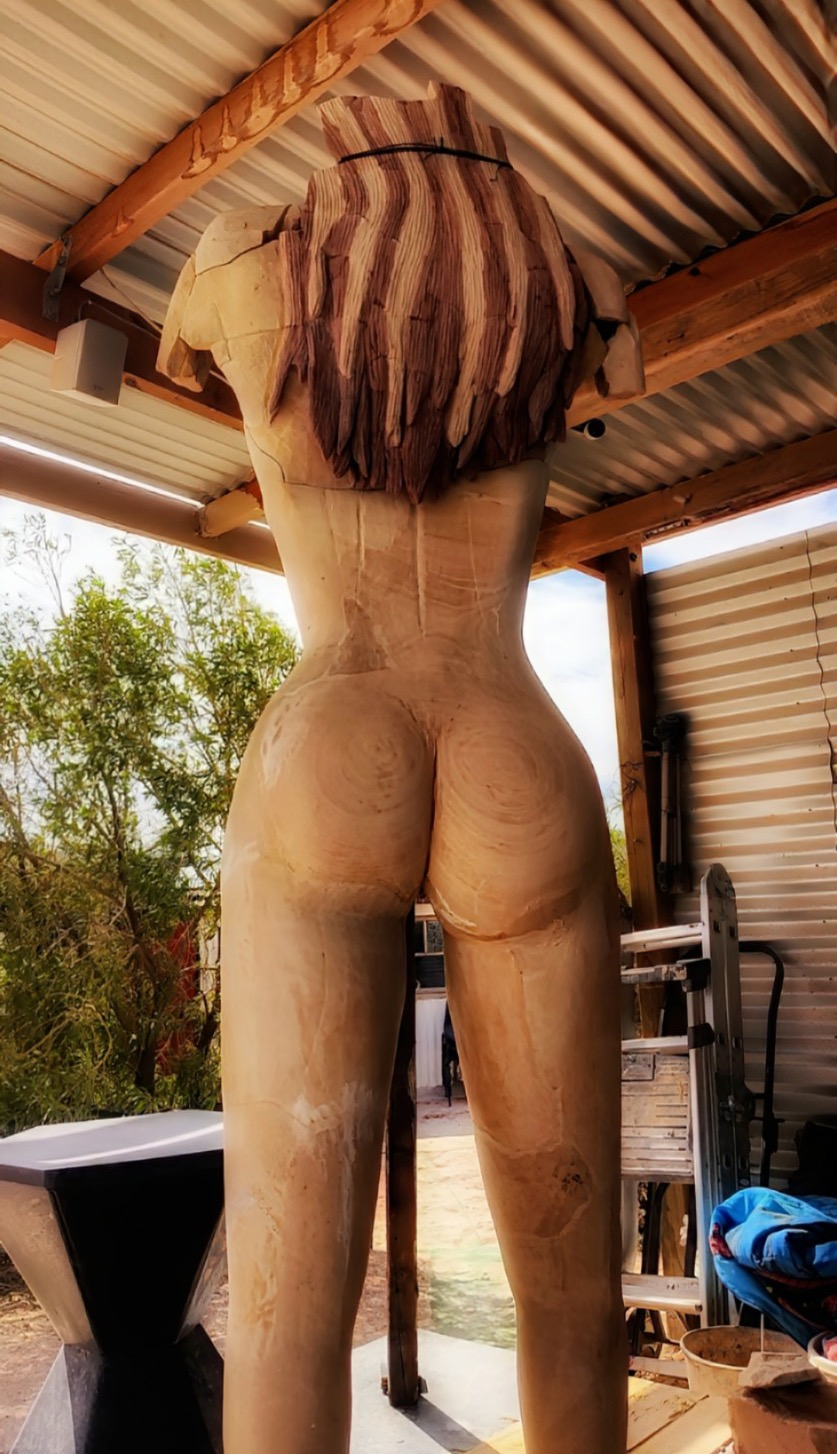
The Goddess in progress, a classical nude sculpture in the Intricarved stone sculpture style.
