= Andamooka, South Australia =

Andamooka
- Town
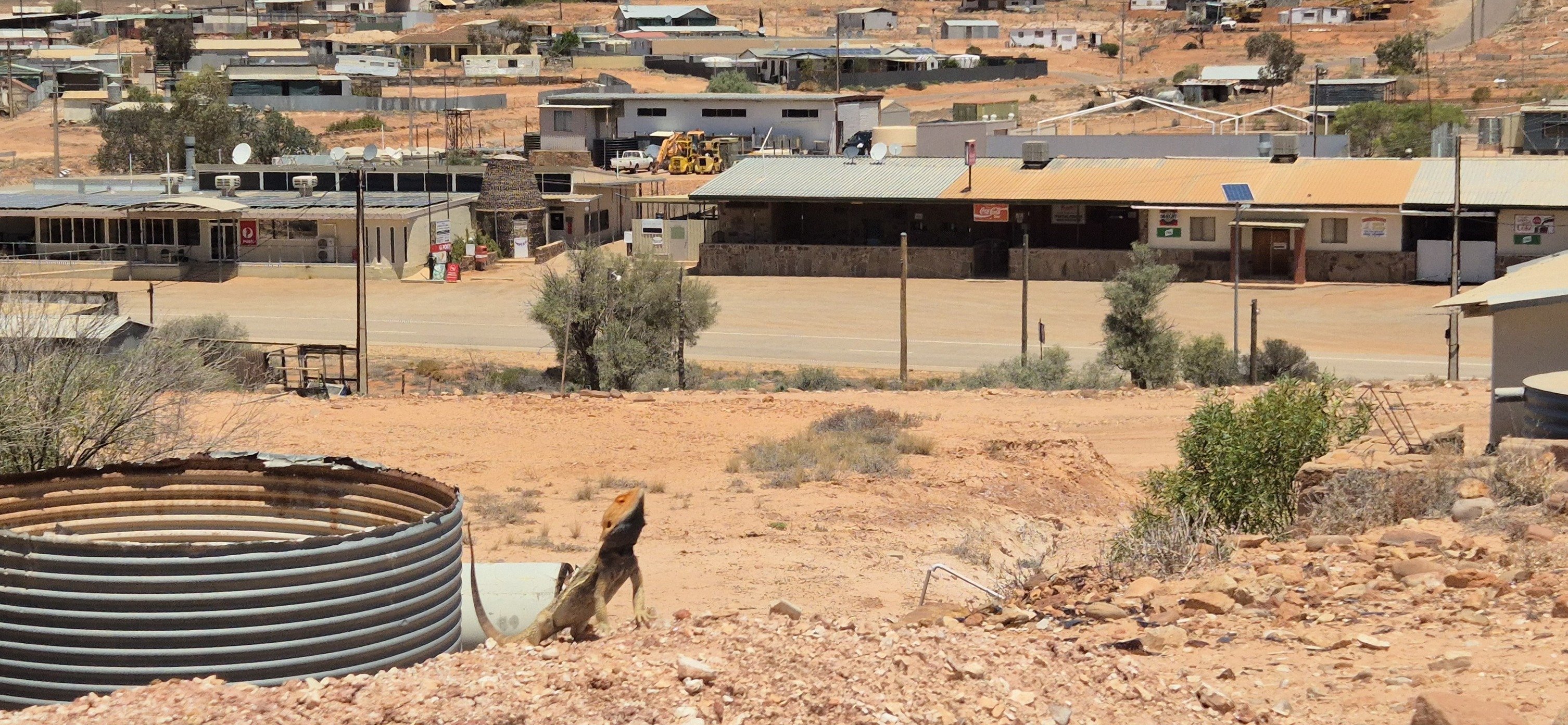
- View of the Andamooka town centre in South Australia, seen from One Tree Hill

- Coordinates: 30°26′55″S 137°09′54″E
- Country: Australia
- State: South Australia
- Region: Far North
- LGA: Pastoral Unincorporated Area
- Location: 600 km (370 mi) N of Adelaide
- Established: 1930s (mining settlement); 16 December 1976 (Government Town); 8 February 2001 (locality)

Government
  - State electorate: Giles
  - Federal division: Grey
- Elevation: 76 m (249 ft)

Population
  - Total: 262 (2021 census)
- Postcode: 5722
- Mean max temp: 27.5 °C (81.5 °F)
- Mean min temp: 13.7 °C (56.7 °F)
- Annual rainfall: 160 mm (6.3 in)
Localities around Andamooka
Andamooka Station	Andamooka Station	Andamooka Station
Andamooka Station	Andamooka	Andamooka Station
Andamooka Station	Andamooka Station	Andamooka Station

Andamooka is a remote opal-mining town approximately 600 kilometers (370 mi) north of Adelaide in the Far North of South Australia on the traditional lands of the Kokatha people. Opal was discovered in 1930, leading to the development of the Andamooka Opal Field, one of Australia's historic opal-producing regions.

The town is administered by the Outback Communities Authority rather than by local government area, and lies within the state electoral district of Giles and the federal Division of Grey. The surrounding opal fields have also produced notable opalised fossils dating to the Early Cretaceous period, reflecting the region's geological history within the ancient Eromanga Sea.

In recent years, the area has developed a small astronomy tourism sector associated with the Andamooka Observatory and nearby Observatory at Woomera, supported by the region's dark skies and low levels of light pollution.

Many early miners built semi-dugout houses into the surrounding hillsides to provide insulation from the extreme desert climate.

Andamooka is noted for several distinctive characteristics, including historic opal mining, semi-dugout housing built into surrounding hillsides, and astronomy tourism associated with the region's dark night skies.

== History ==
Andamooka lies on the Kokatha traditional land. The name is derived from a salt lake, named from the Aboriginal "Andemorka", by which the locality was known to Europeans as early as 1866, well before opal was discovered. The meaning is uncertain. At that time (1866), it was also known as 'Swinden's Country', after Charles Swinden of Riverton, who, in 1857, led a small horseback party that discovered it. They described it as a tract of 'generally sterile country, but having some patches of good pastoral land'. It was those meagre prospects which attracted pastoralists, resulting in the foundation of Andamooka Station, which for the next half century was the only industry. Since the granting of Native Title and pastoral leases in 2014, the Indigenous-owned Kokotha Pastoral Company now operates Andamooka Station, together with the adjacent Purple Downs and Roxby Downs Stations.

=== Discovery of opal ===
Opal was discovered in the area in 1930, leading to the establishment of the Andamooka opal field. The settlement developed from scattered miners’ camps that formed as prospectors moved into the district following the discovery. An Andamooka Opal Fields Post Office opened on 13 January 1947 and was renamed Andamooka in 1990.

=== Heritage-listed buildings ===
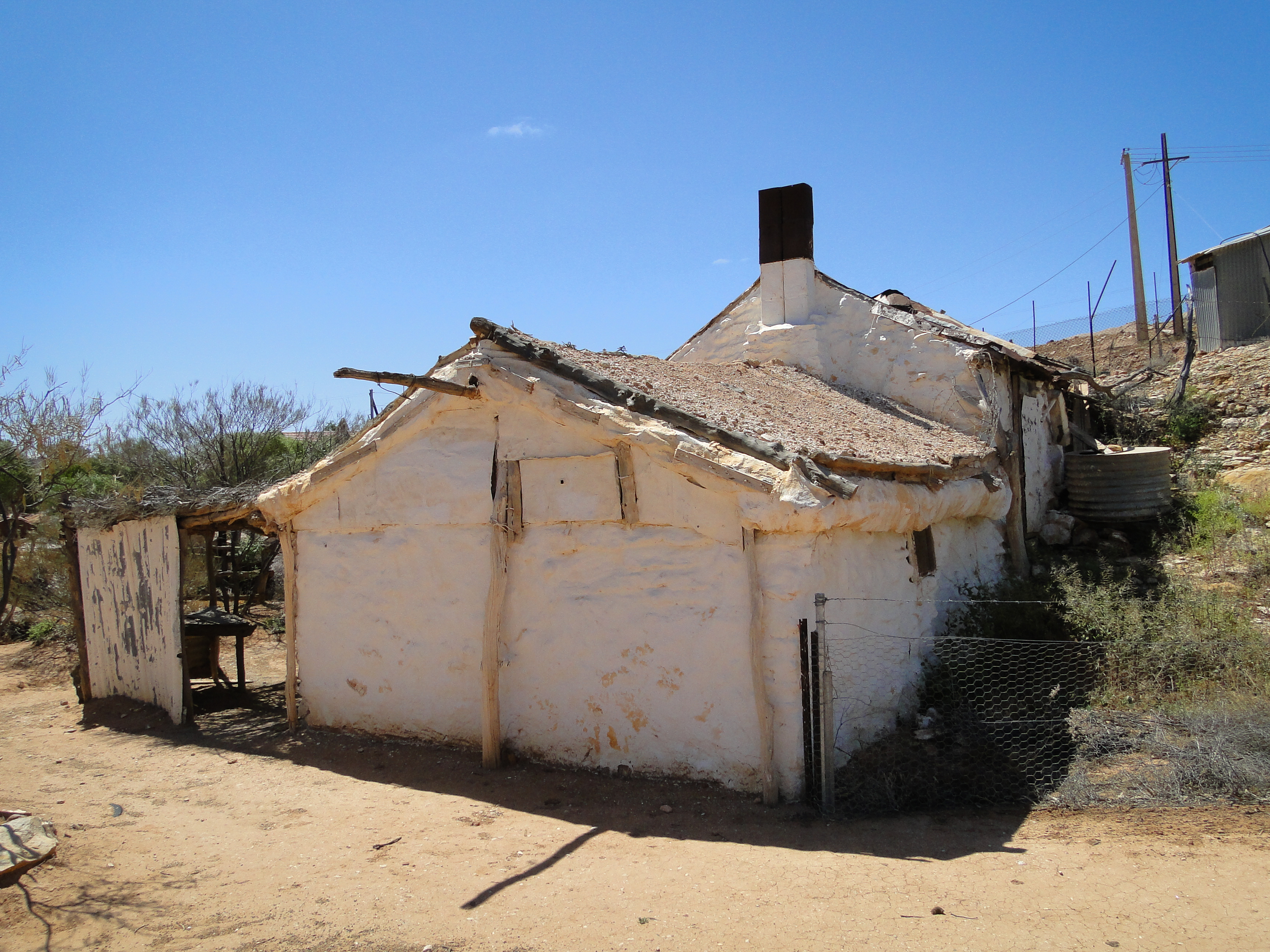
Opal miner, Frank Albertoni's cottage, dug into the hillside at Andamooka, South Australia.

Several historic buildings in the town are heritage-listed: the Andamooka Historic Precinct (containing Frank Albertoni's House, Bob Cutzow's Dugout, Tom Brady's Dugout, Mrs Perry's Kitchen, and Andy Absalom's House) and Dick Clark's Residence are both listed on the South Australian Heritage Register.

== Climate ==
Andamooka has a hot arid climate (Köppen BWh), typical of northern South Australia. With daytime temperatures in summer regularly topping 40 °C or 104 °F and night temperatures in winter often dropping close to 0 °C or 32 °F. On January 29, 2026, Andamooka reached 50 °C or 122 °F it was only the eighth time in recorded history anywhere in Australia. Annual rainfall is extremely low, even by Australian standards, with the mean in the region about 190 millimeters (7.5in) and the median around 163 millimeters (6.4in). In particularly dry years rainfall has been much lower, with only 33.2 millimeters (1.31in) recorded in 2019 and 39 millimeters (1.54in) in 2002

Climate data for Andamooka
Month	Jan	Feb	Mar	Apr	May	Jun	Jul	Aug	Sep	Oct	Nov	Dec	Year
Record high °C (°F)	50.0 (122.0)	47.3 (117.1)	43.9 (111.0)	40.0 (104.0)	33.0 (91.4)	30.2 (86.4)	29.6 (85.3)	35.5 (95.9)	39.0 (102.2)	43.4 (110.1)	48.0 (118.4)	47.2 (117.0)	50.0 (122.0)
Mean daily maximum °C (°F)	36.6 (97.9)	35.7 (96.3)	32.4 (90.3)	27.4 (81.3)	22.3 (72.1)	18.6 (65.5)	18.6 (65.5)	20.8 (69.4)	24.8 (76.6)	28.4 (83.1)	31.8 (89.2)	34.7 (94.5)	27.7 (81.9)
Mean daily minimum °C (°F)	21.6 (70.9)	21.2 (70.2)	18.5 (65.3)	14.1 (57.4)	10.0 (50.0)	7.0 (44.6)	6.0 (42.8)	7.3 (45.1)	10.5 (50.9)	13.7 (56.7)	17.1 (62.8)	19.6 (67.3)	13.9 (57.0)
Record low °C (°F)	11.5 (52.7)	10.0 (50.0)	8.0 (46.4)	4.9 (40.8)	1.1 (34.0)	−1.0 (30.2)	−1.6 (29.1)	−0.4 (31.3)	1.7 (35.1)	5.2 (41.4)	7.5 (45.5)	10.2 (50.4)	−1.6 (29.1)
Average rainfall mm (inches)	20.0 (0.79)	21.4 (0.84)	13.4 (0.53)	16.1 (0.63)	14.6 (0.57)	15.4 (0.61)	11.3 (0.44)	12.0 (0.47)	11.3 (0.44)	19.1 (0.75)	15.0 (0.59)	19.1 (0.75)	188.7 (7.43)
Average rainy days	3.4	2.5	2.2	2.5	3.5	4.4	3.7	3.9	3.5	3.7	3.9	3.3	40.5

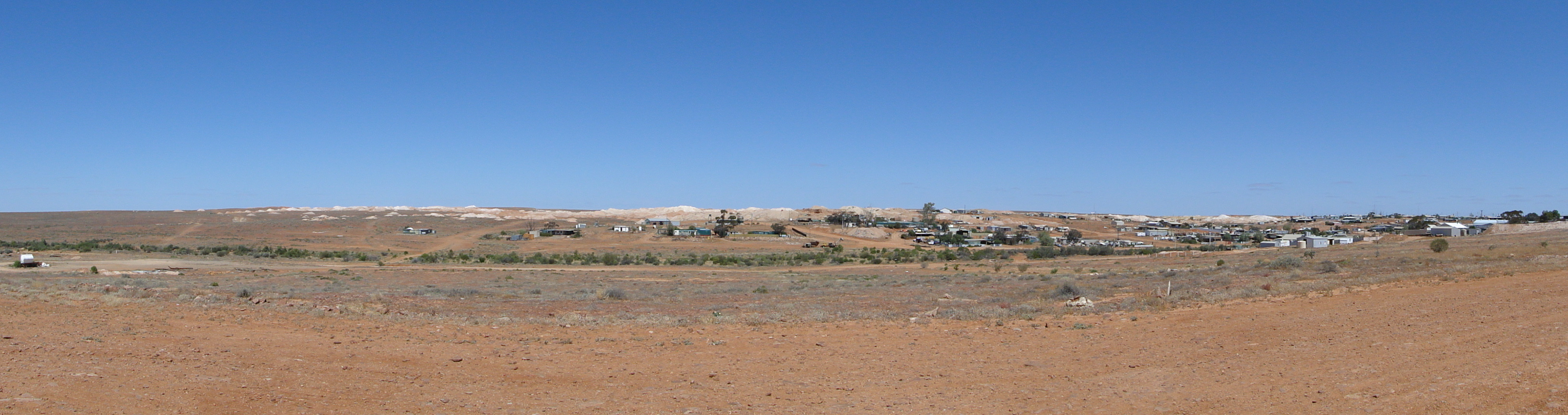

== Opal mining ==
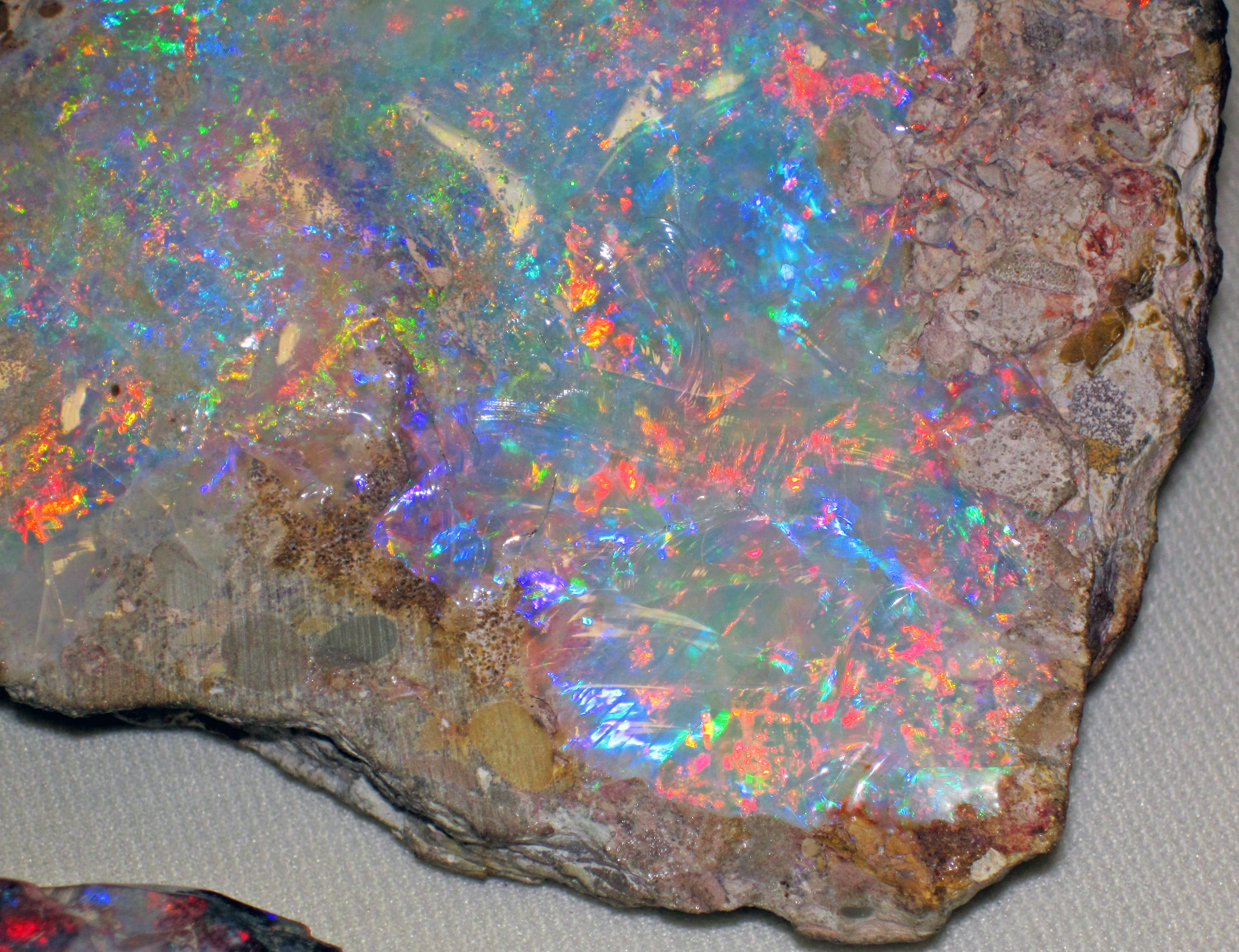
Precious opal from Andamooka Opal Fields

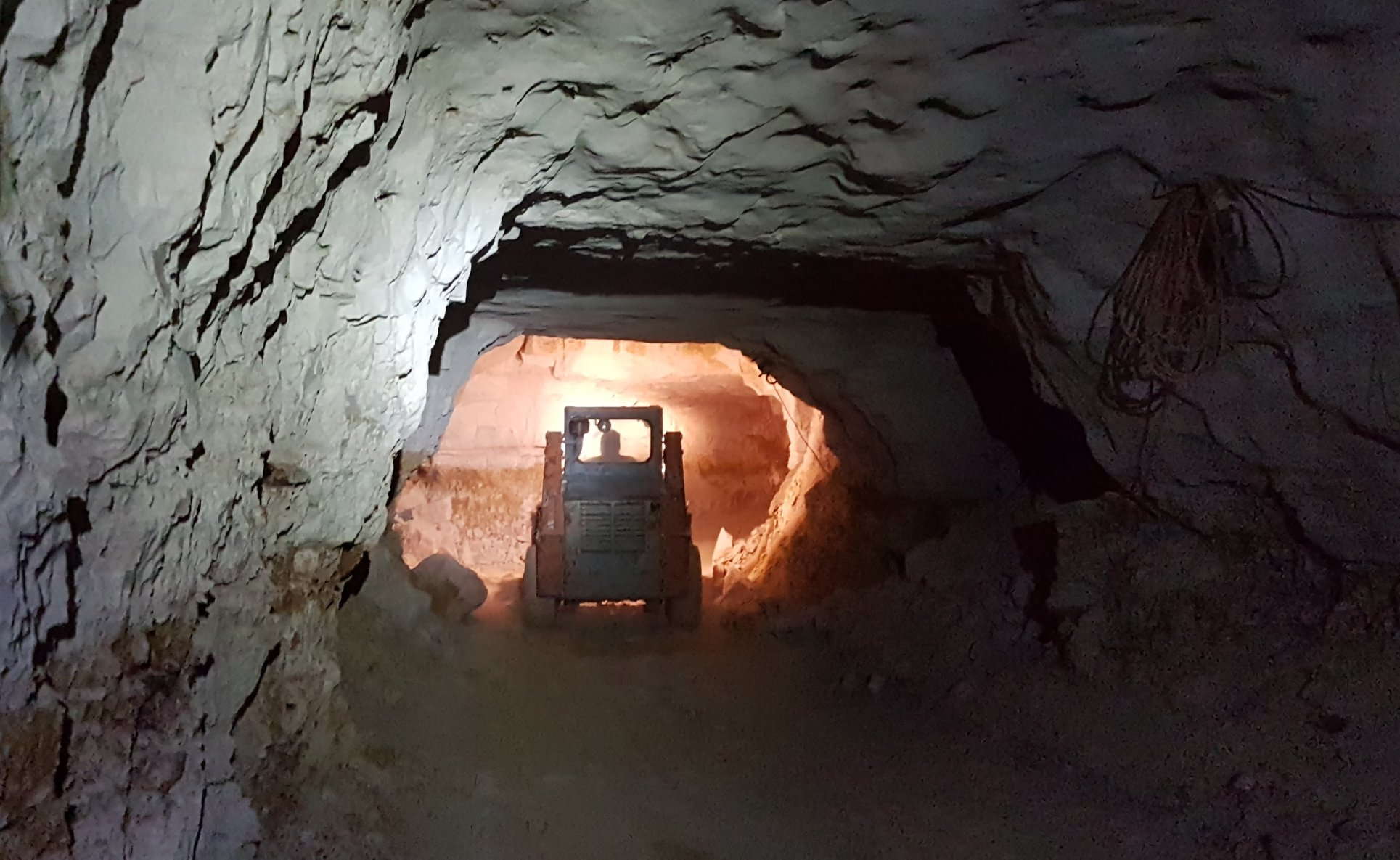
Underground opal mining tunnel at Hallion Hill, Andamooka, South Australia, 2019

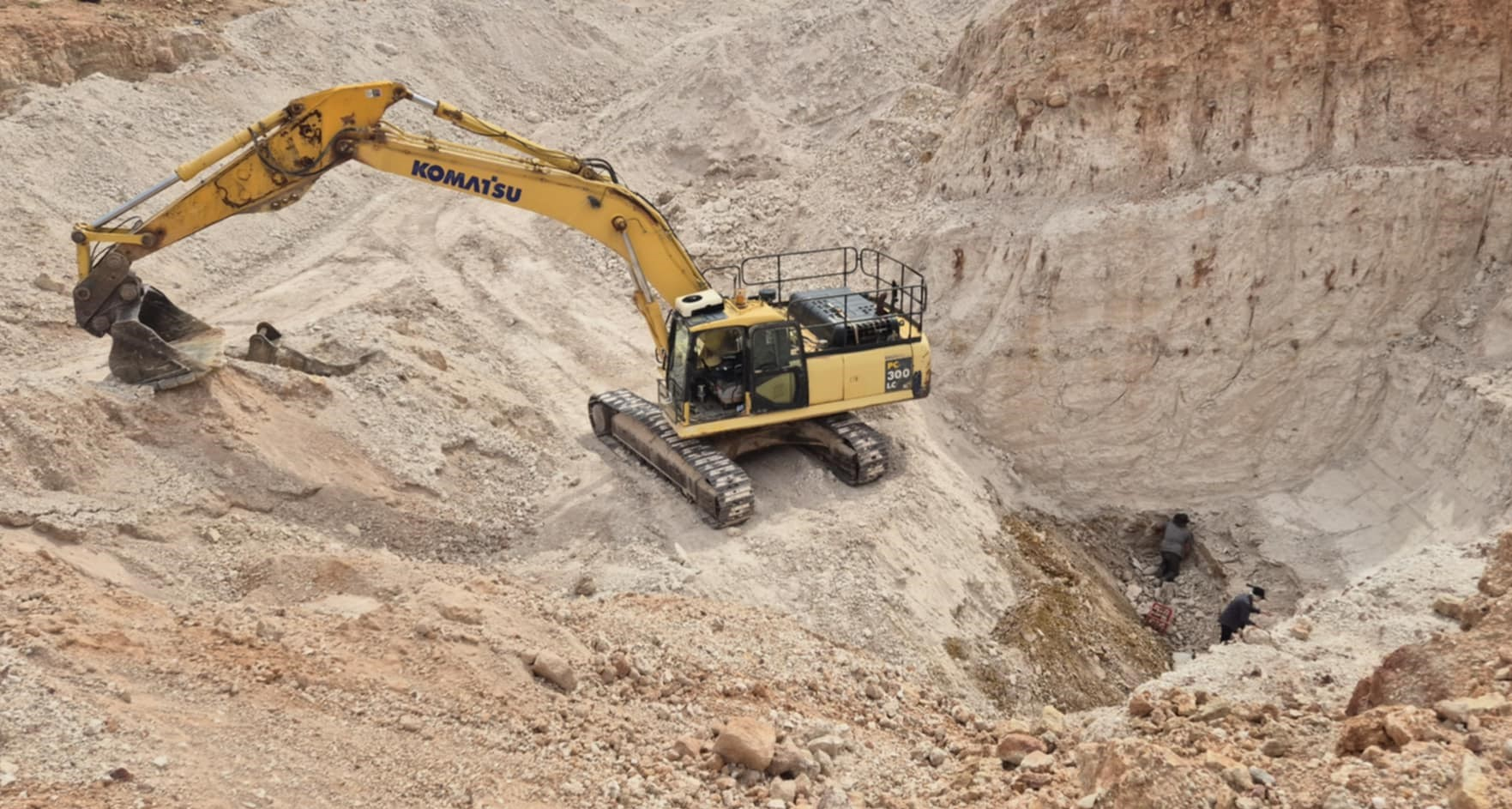
Open-cut opal mining in Andamooka, South Australia, 2024.

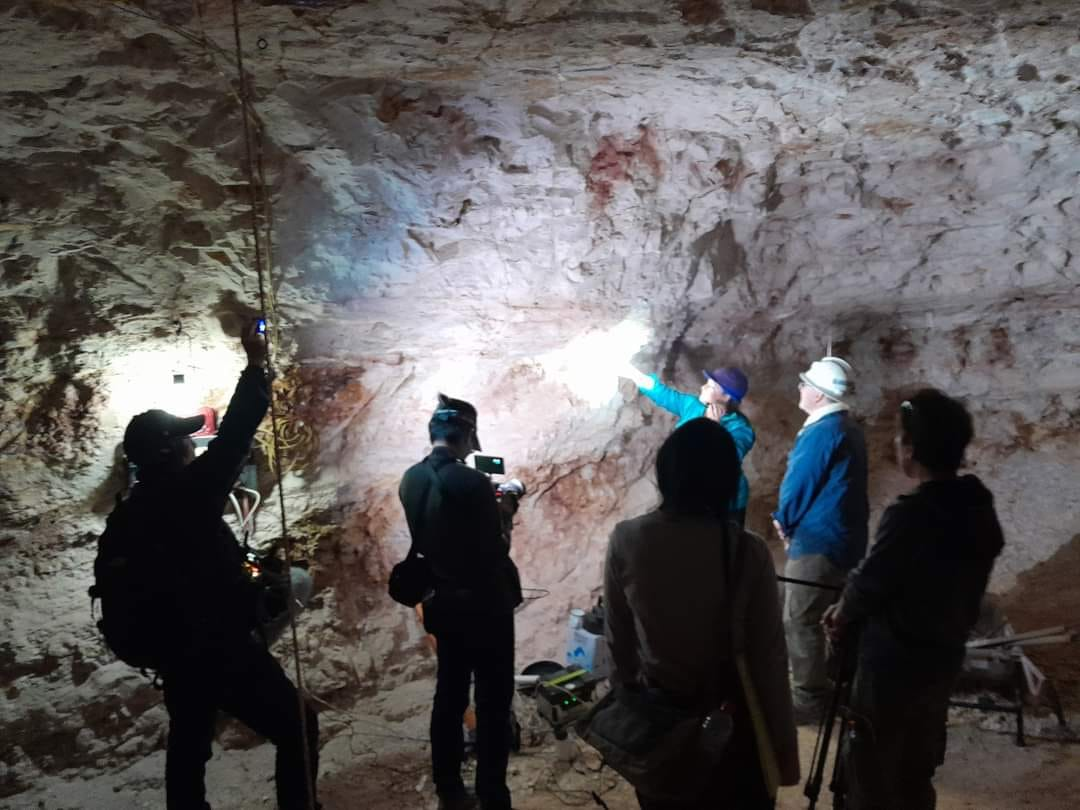
Documentary filming inside an opal mine in Andamooka

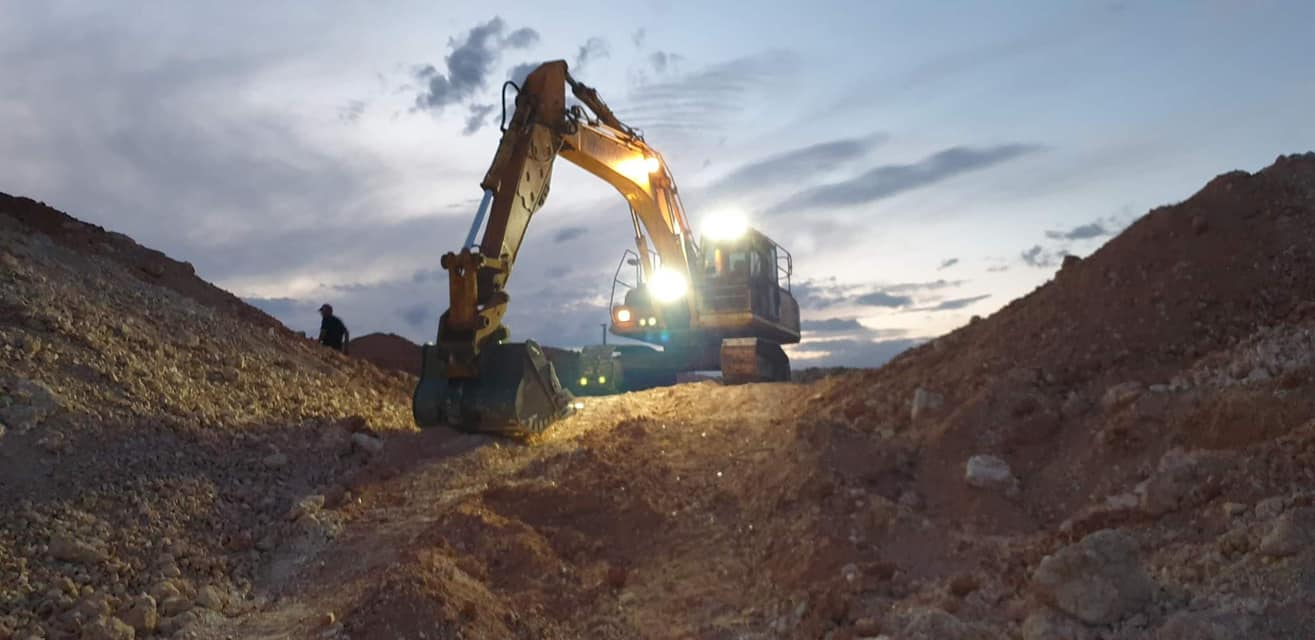
Excavator operating at dusk in an open-cut opal mine in the Andamooka Opal Fields, South Australia

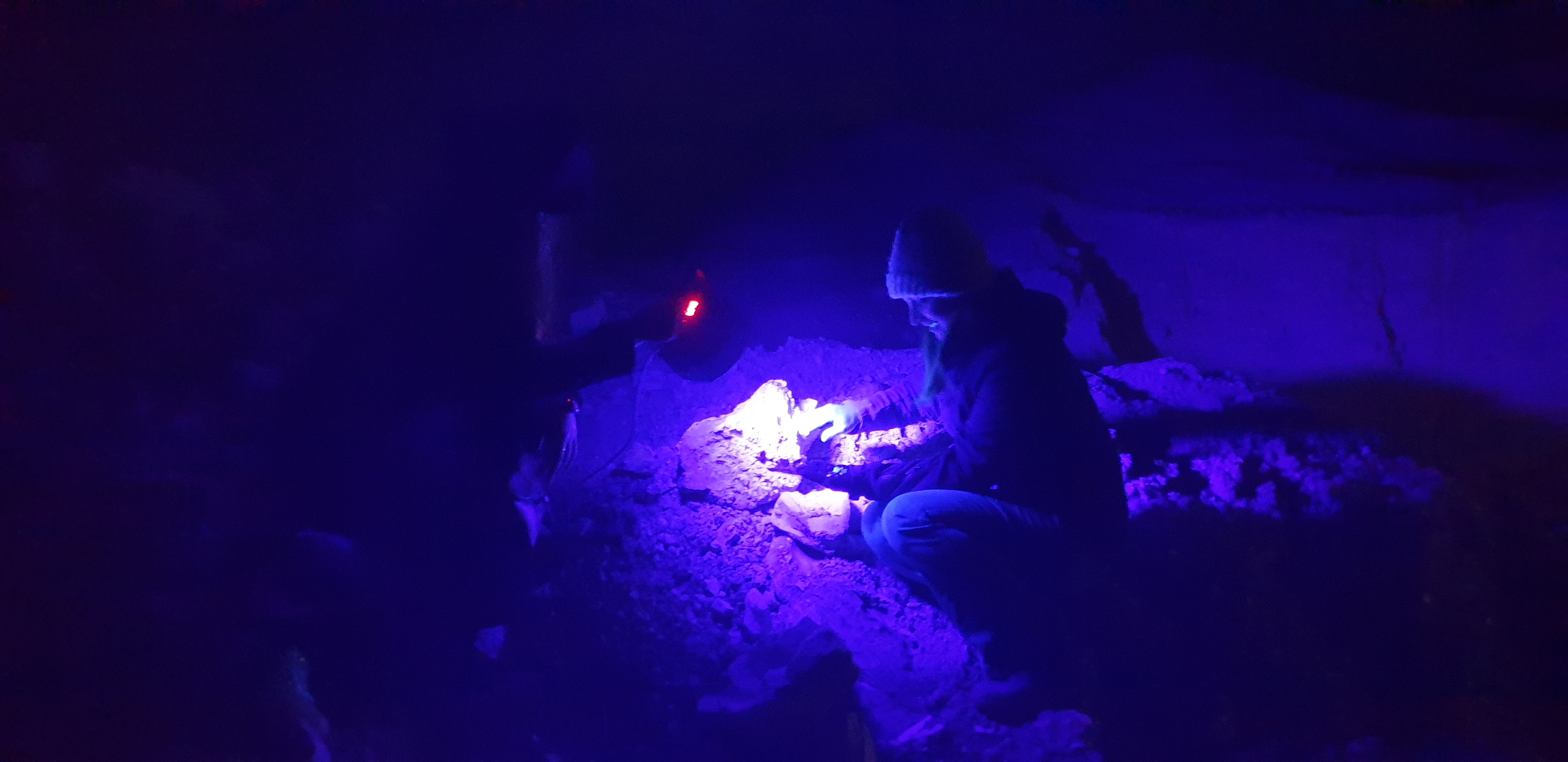
Opal mining using ultraviolet light to identify opal fluorescence in Andamooka, South Australia (2021)

There are numerous opal fields in the Andamooka Opal Fields, with White Dam as one of the principal outliers. The original pick and shovel shaft miners, many of whom were the bush characters and social outcasts who gave the settlement a 'Wild West' reputation, were gradually displaced from the 1960s and 70s by the arrival of miners using bulldozers which made deep cuts to reach the respective opal levels, from where horizontal drives could easily be made to exploit the level entirely. Andamooka is one of several historic opal-mining settlements in Australia, alongside towns such as Coober Pedy in South Australia and Lightning Ridge in New South Wales. The opal levels at Andamooka are not as deep as those at other fields, such as Coober Pedy and Lightning Ridge. However, although the opal may be easier to reach, it is generally scarcer and of lower quality. Those factors always made this gem field attractive to smaller prospectors with limited capital. Nevertheless, some remarkable gems have been mined, including the Andamooka Opal, discovered in Andamooka and named after the locality.

In Australian opal fields such as Andamooka, noodling refers to the informal practice of searching the ground surface and shallow soil for exposed opal fragments, particularly after rainfall.

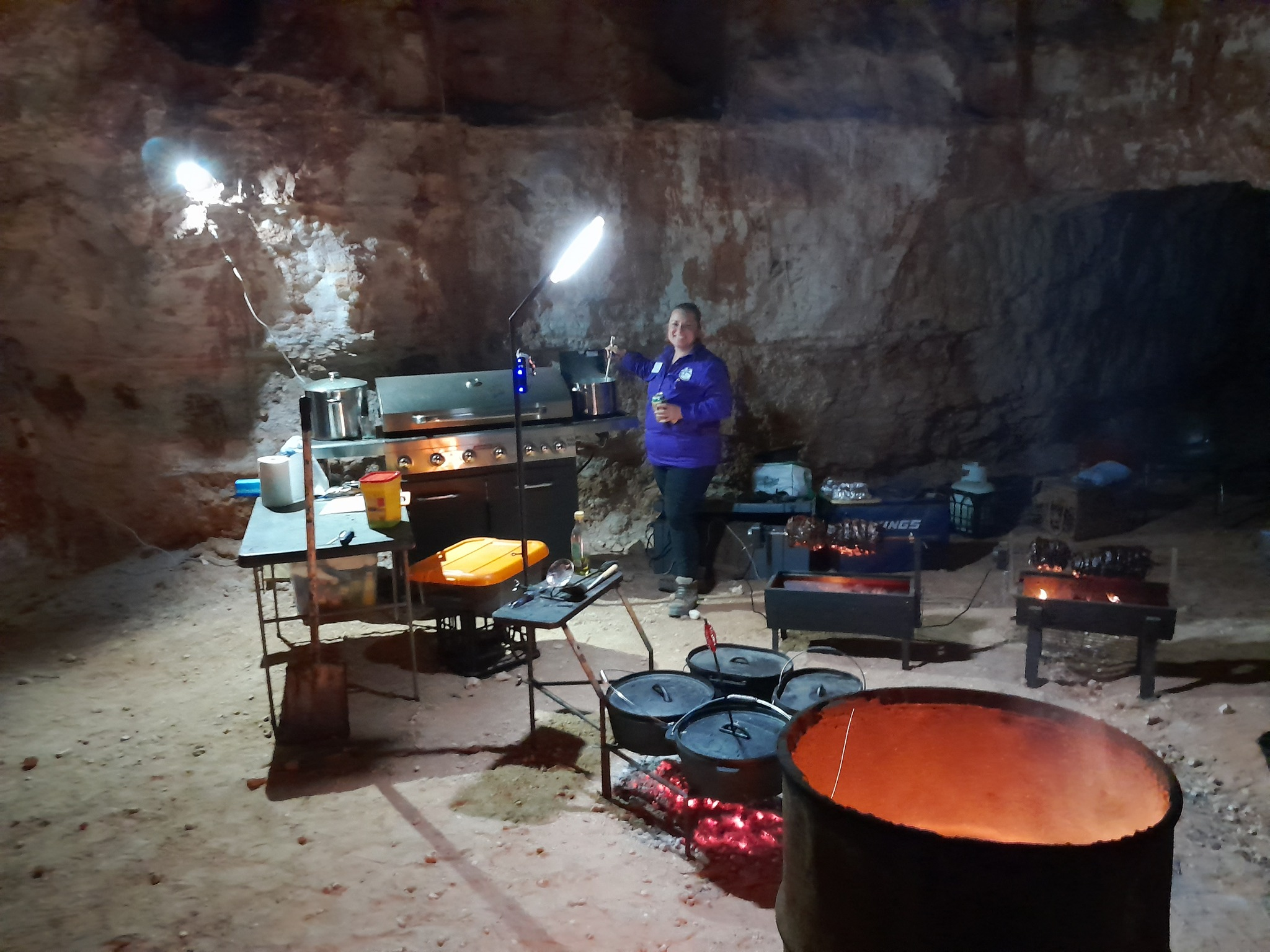
Interior of an underground opal mine in Andamooka, South Australia, showing cooking equipment and lighting installations, 2023

Andamooka’s opal fields are influenced by episodic rainfall, which can expose opalised material across the surrounding landscape. In January 2024, heavy rain in the region exposed opal fragments near the town as stormwater washed away topsoil and sediment. The event attracted interest from fossickers and opal enthusiasts, highlighting the continuing geological processes that bring opals closer to the surface in the area’s sandstone and sedimentary deposits.

=== Famous opals from Andamooka ===
- The Andamooka Opal, presented to Queen Elizabeth II in 1954, is also known as the Queen's Opal on the occasion of her first visit to Australia. After cutting, the opal weighed 203 carats (40.6 g).
- The Addyman Plesiosaur, "the finest known opalised skeleton on Earth."

== Palaeontology ==
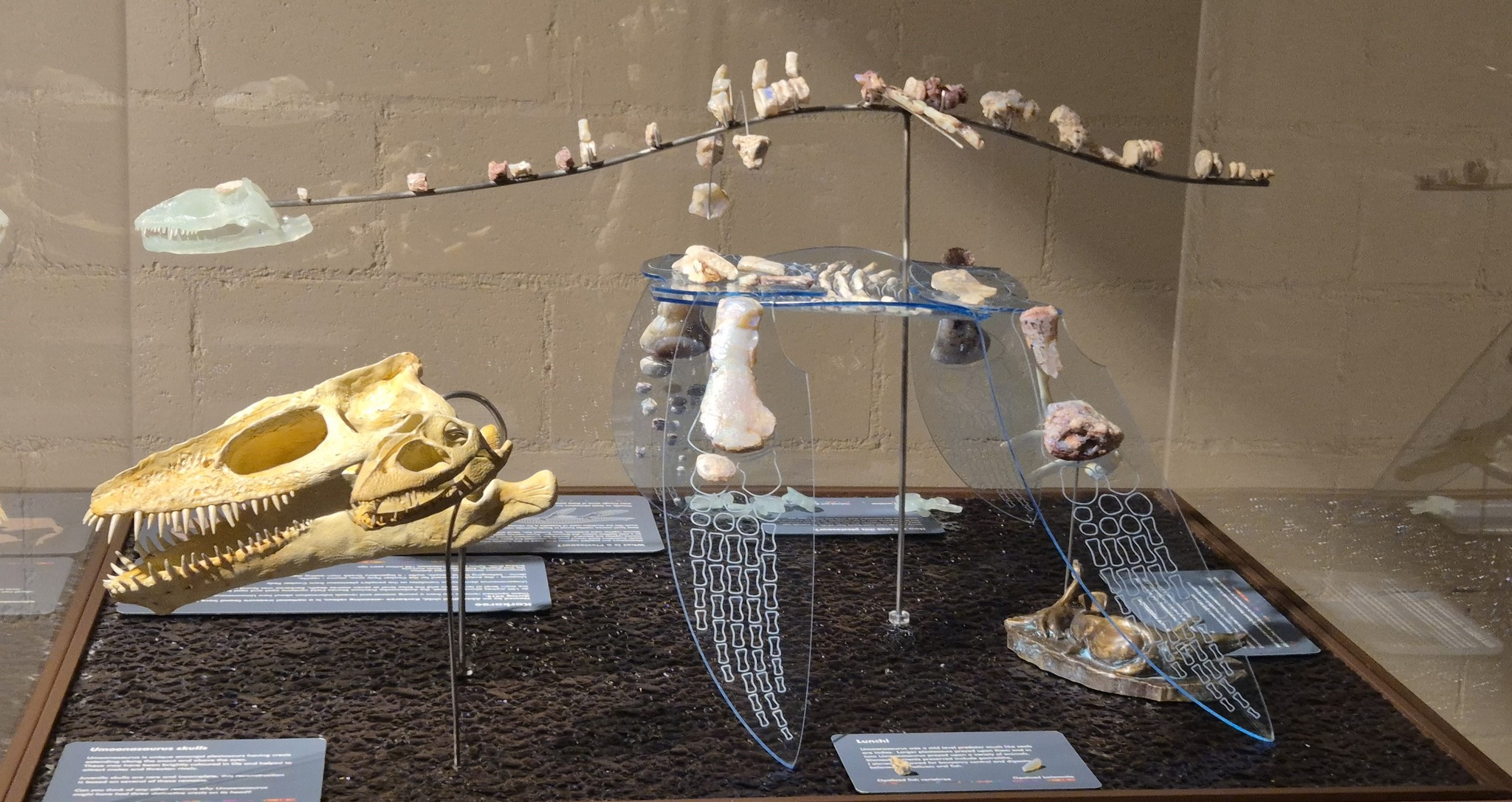
Karkaroo, a juvenile plesiosaur fossil from the Early Cretaceous, is displayed in Andamooka, South Australia,2025.

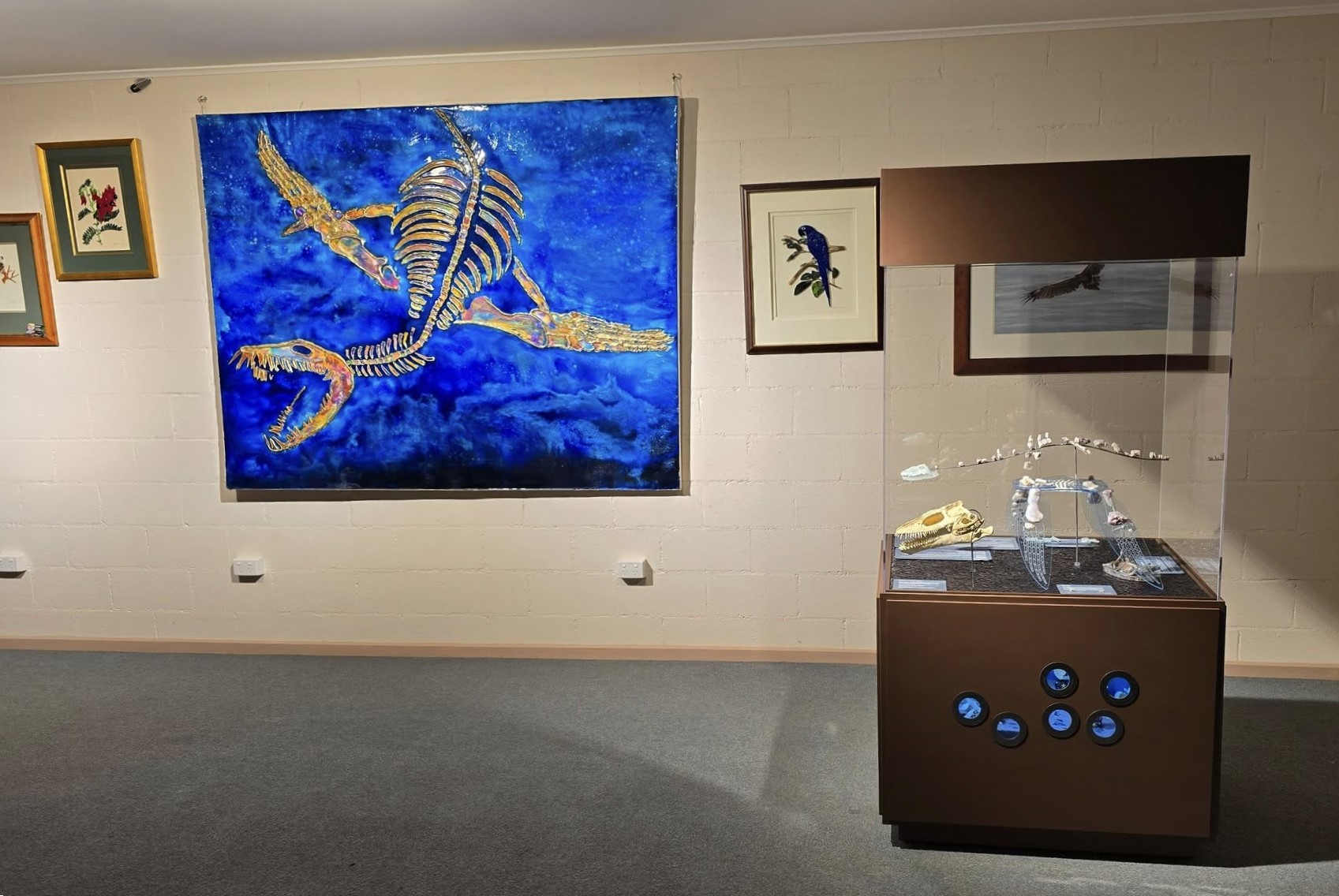
Karkaroo, a juvenile plesiosaur fossil from the Early Cretaceous, is displayed in Andamooka, South Australia,2025.

The opal fields around Andamooka lie within sedimentary formations associated with the ancient Eromanga Sea, which covered much of inland Australia during the Early Cretaceous. The region has produced opalised fossil material, including marine reptiles and other vertebrate remains, linking the town's opal deposits with an important palaeontological record.

The Andamooka opal fields are notable for yielding a range of opalised fossils, which have attracted scientific interest. An article published by ABC Science in 2006 described how fossilised remains preserved in opalised form, including bones and teeth, provide insights into the region's prehistoric ecosystems and contribute to a broader understanding of opalisation processes. The report highlighted that such fossils are relatively rare and that the unique geological conditions in South Australia's opal fields, including those at Andamooka, can result in exceptional preservation through opal replacement of original bone material.

The opal fields surrounding Andamooka have yielded numerous opalised fossil specimens dating to the Early Cretaceous. In 2016, a juvenile plesiosaur fossil, later nicknamed Karkaroo, was discovered at the Tea Tree opal field near Andamooka at a depth of approximately 8.5 metres. The specimen is estimated to be around 110 million years old. It is believed to represent a newborn or very young plesiosaur that lived in the inland Eromanga Sea, which covered much of central Australia during the Early Cretaceous. The fossil underwent approximately two years of conservation work before being returned to Andamooka for display. Opalised fossils from the Andamooka region, including marine reptiles and dinosaurs, are associated with the geological conditions that also produced the area's precious opal deposits.

In December 2018, the Australian Broadcasting Corporation reported that a rare dinosaur fossil, Kakuru kujani, discovered in South Australia [26], had been found near Andamooka after being missing for more than 45 years. The specimen, believed to be part of an opalised dinosaur limb, was rediscovered by a fossicker and subsequently identified by palaeontologists. The fossil is significant for its rarity and its contribution to understanding dinosaur remains in the opal fields of South Australia.

The geological conditions that produced opal in the Andamooka fields are closely linked to the region's fossil record. During the Early Cretaceous period, much of inland Australia was covered by the Eromanga Sea, and sediments deposited in this environment later formed the sandstone layers that host both opal deposits and opalised fossils. As groundwater rich in silica moved through these sediments, fossil material was gradually replaced or preserved by opal, creating the rare opalised fossils for which the region is known.

== Hospitality and licensed venues ==
The Tuckabox Hotel, a long-standing licensed venue in Andamooka, closed in April 2019, according to reporting by The Advertiser. In December 2021, the Opal Hotel in the town was destroyed by fire. In 2022, the South Australian Environment Protection Authority issued a clean-up order relating to asbestos at the site. In January 2025, ABC News reported that, following the closure of the town's pub, community members organised a temporary pop-up liquor licence to facilitate social gatherings in the absence of a permanent licensed premises.

== Andamooka Airport (YAMK) ==
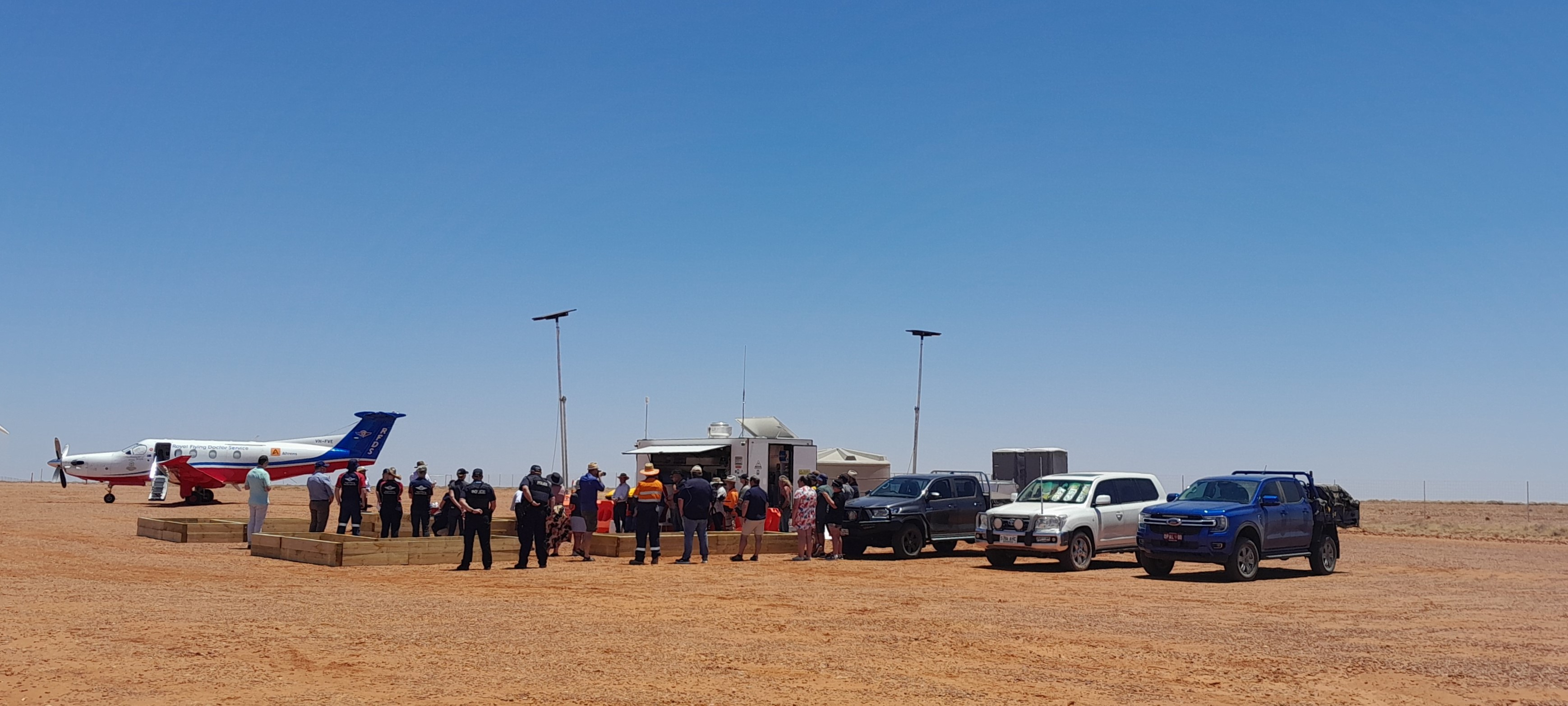
Royal Flying Doctor Service aircraft at Andamooka Airport (YAMK), South Australia, 2026

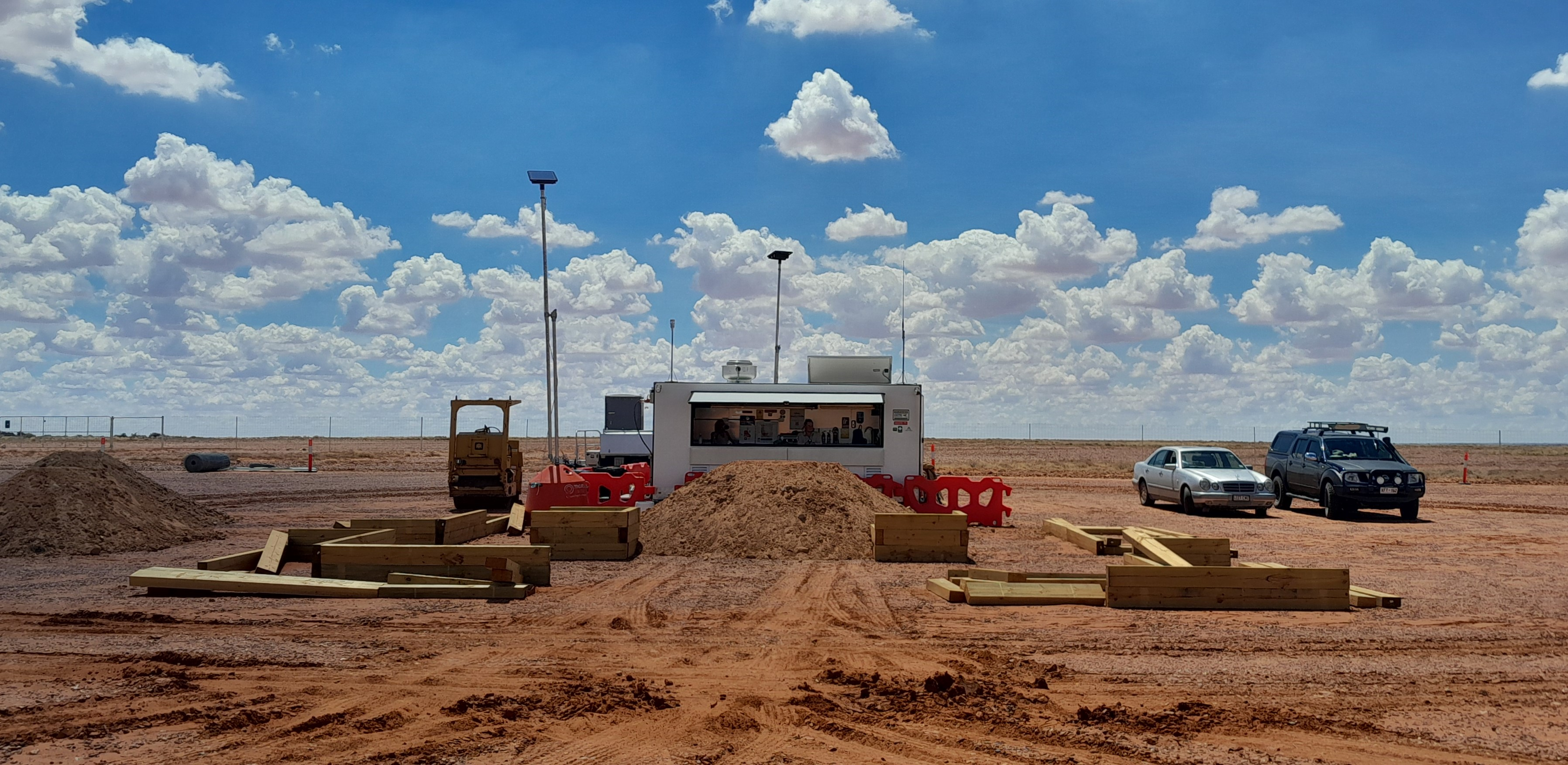
Infrastructure works at Andamooka Airport, South Australia, 2026.

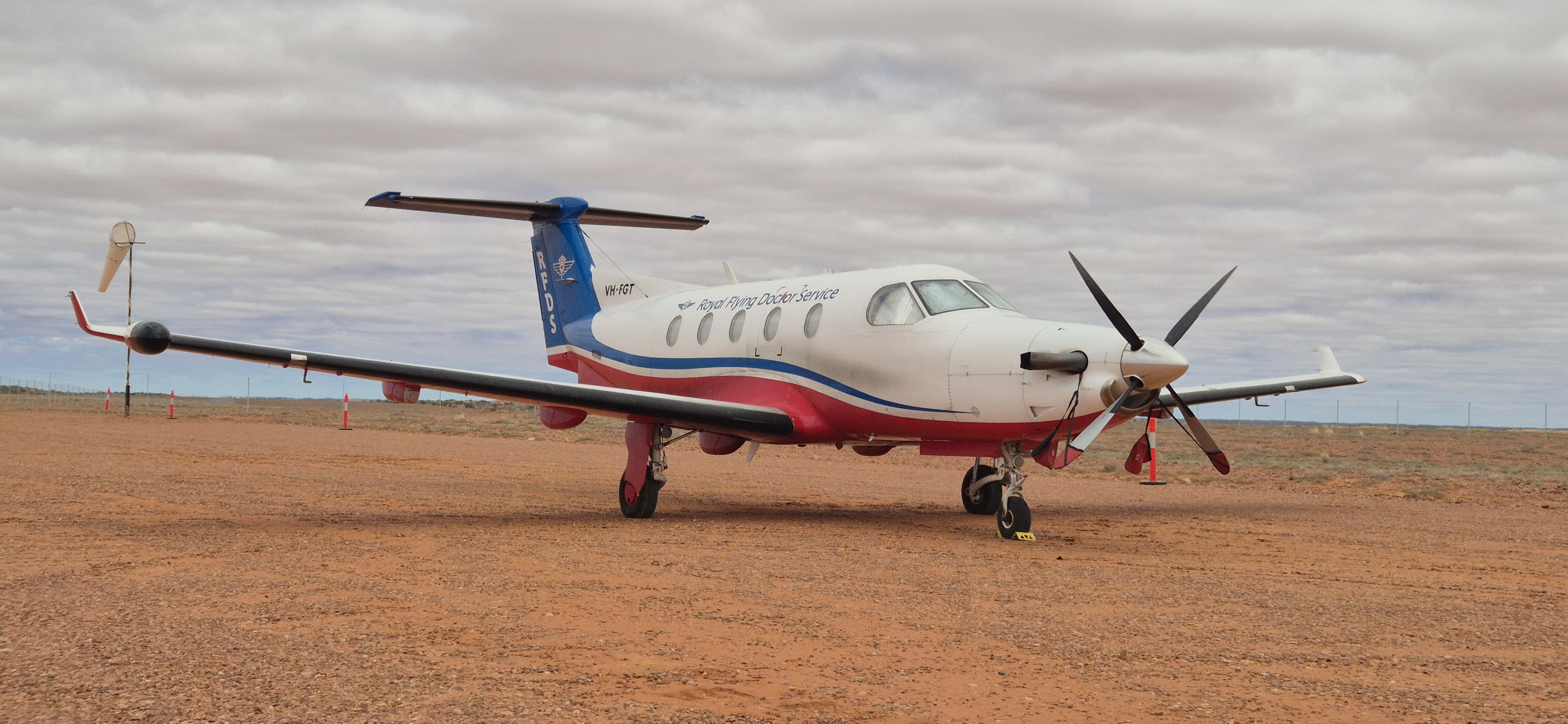
Pilatus PC-12 VH-FGT operated by the Royal Flying Doctor Service parked at Andamooka Airport, South Australia.

Andamooka had an old airstrip that had been closed since 2011, meaning that the Royal Flying Doctor Service (RFDS), which runs clinics in the town, had to transport patients to the Olympic Dam Airport meaning that the RFDS, which runs clinics in the town, had to transport patients to the Olympic Dam Airport, 40 km (25 mi) away, to fly them to hospital for emergency care. The community advocated for assistance in creating a new airstrip. Construction of the new Andamooka Airport, which includes lighting, a remote weather station, and a live camera system, is funded by the Australian Government under its Local Roads and Community Infrastructure program, with the Andamooka Opal Fields Tourism Association managing the project. The new airport was formally opened on 21 January 2026 by Joe Szakacs, Minister for Trade and Investment, Industry, Innovation and Science, Local Government and Veterans Affairs, and Geoff Brock, Independent Member for Stuart. In 2026, the Andamooka Opal Fields Tourism Association received funding through the Royal Automobile Association of South Australia (RAA) Regional Safety Grants program to purchase a multi-tyre roller for maintaining the local airstrip and access roads after rain. In 2026, the Andamooka Opal Fields Tourism Association (AOFTA) received funding through the South Australian Department of Human Services 2025–26 Supporting Regional and Remote Volunteers program to assist with volunteer training and operational support at the local airfield. In addition to RFDS use, it is hoped that the airstrip will attract more tourists to the region via charter flights. The IATA airport code is "ADO", and the ICAO code is "YAMK".

As early as June 2006, the Andamooka community expressed support for the development of a new airstrip in the region in connection with the proposed expansion of the nearby Olympic Dam mine, citing potential benefits for improved access and services for the remote township and surrounding communities.

In April 2013, ABC News reported that residents in Andamooka and other remote South Australian communities were re-evaluating the value of maintaining and developing airstrips to support medical, emergency, and general access, noting community interest in improving local aviation infrastructure in light of the challenges of distance and isolation.

== Andamooka Observatory ==
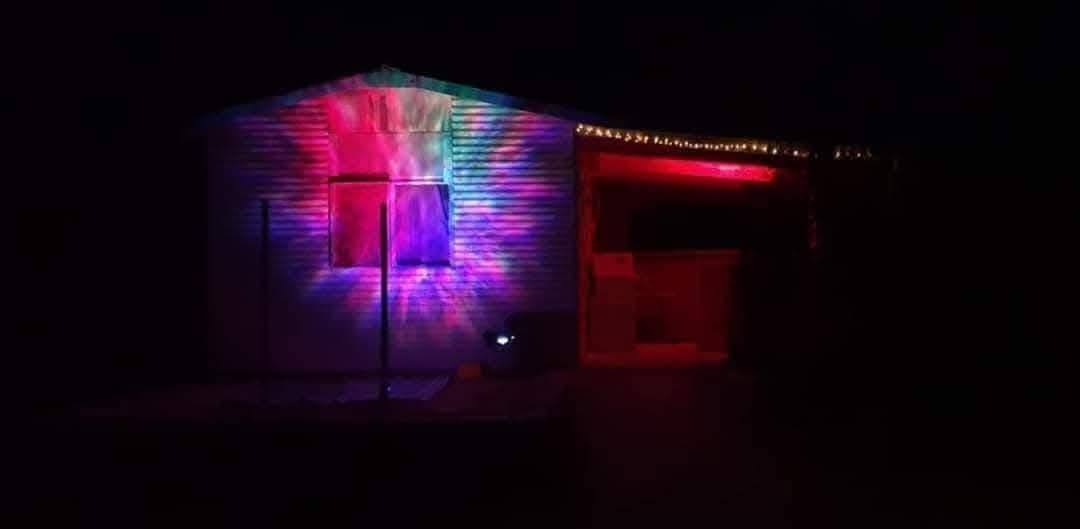
The Andamooka Observatory illuminated at night in Andamooka, South Australia, 2025.

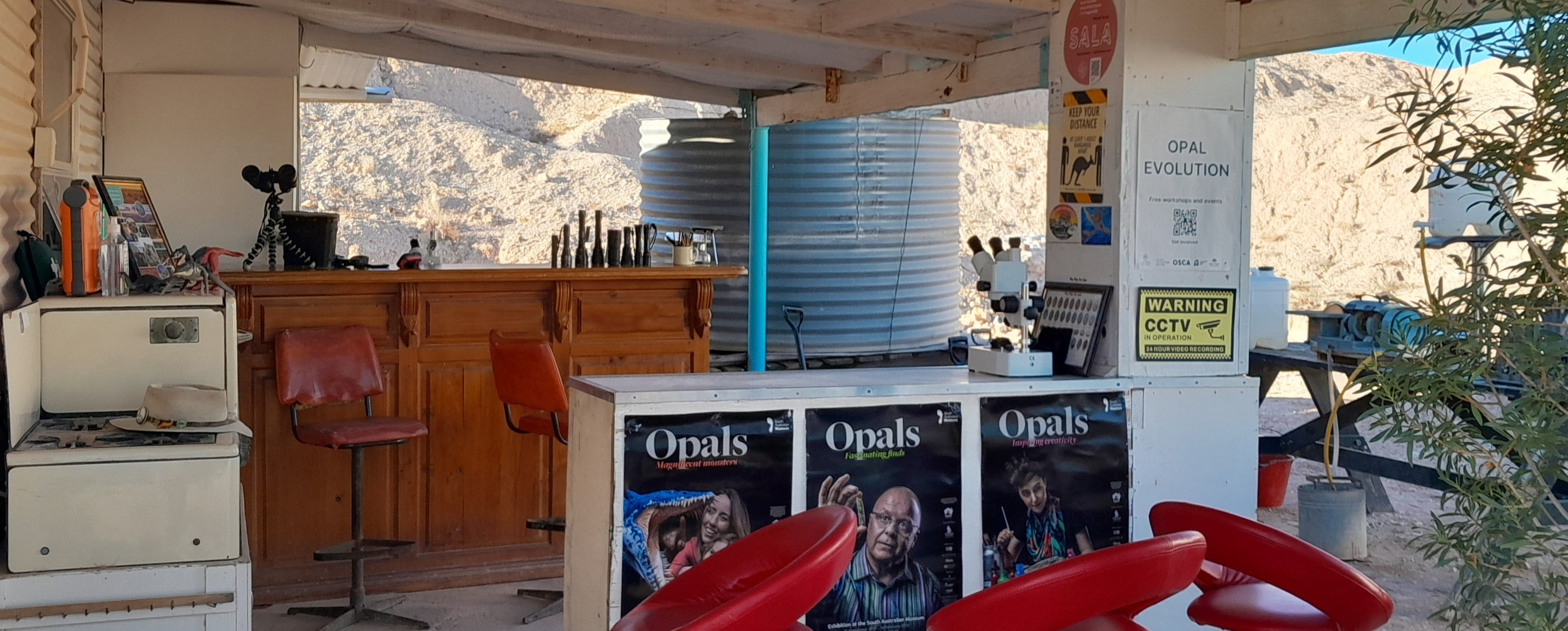
Exterior view of the Andamooka Observatory in Andamooka, South Australia, showing the open-air bar and display area. Photograph taken June 2025.

The Andamooka Observatory is an astronomy facility located in Andamooka, South Australia. The remote desert environment surrounding Andamooka provides very low levels of light pollution, creating favourable conditions for astronomical observation and public stargazing. The observatory is part of an initiative to create an outback stargazing trail, reflecting interest in astronomical and night-sky tourism. The observatory has been cited in ABC News coverage of regional astronomy initiatives. In September 2025, the observatory was mentioned alongside the Woomera Observatory as part of an initiative to create an outback stargazing trail, reflecting interest in astronomical experiences in remote parts of South Australia. The observatory is also listed as a science engagement site in national events, including those associated with National Science Week, which promotes astronomy education and community science activities.

== White Dam and Bill’s Pub ==
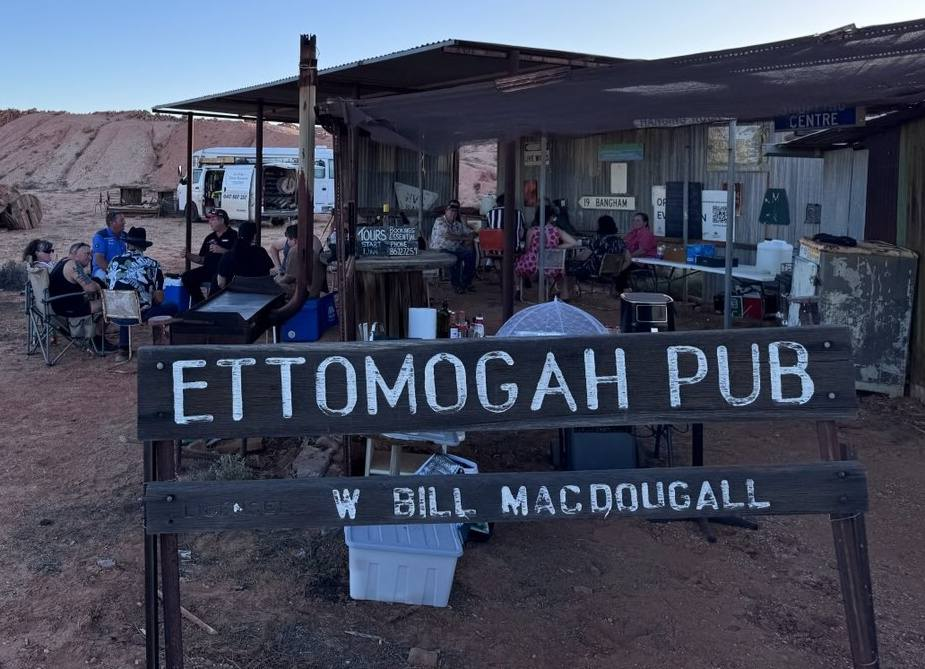
Bill's Pub (also known as Ettomogah Pub) at White Dam near Andamooka, South Australia, 2025

There are numerous opal fields in the Andamooka district, with White Dam as one of the principal outliers. Bill's Pub operated at the White Dam opal field from 1965 until 1989. Established by William “Bill” McDougall, the informal outback shack became known as a meeting place for miners and travelers. According to reporting in the Los Angeles Times, McDougall raised funds for the Royal Flying Doctor Service by offering homemade port in exchange for donations. He was awarded the Order of Australia in 1989, and the pub ceased operations following his death later that year.

== Population ==
In October 2011, the Australian Broadcasting Corporation reported that Andamooka's population had increased in recent years, driven in part by employment and economic activity associated with mining operations in the region. The article noted that the town had experienced growth linked to strong demand for opals and related services, and that residents were cautiously optimistic about prospects associated with resource-sector developments at the time.

In 2015, ABC News reported that Andamooka experienced population decline following BHP Billiton's decision in 2012 to shelve the proposed multi-billion-dollar expansion of the Olympic Dam mine. The Andamooka Progress Association, stated that the slowdown contributed to residents leaving the town and the closure of some local businesses. The report also noted that, while opal mining remained part of the town's identity, it had become a smaller-scale industry, and community representatives expressed interest in expanding tourism as an alternative economic focus.

In June 2015, ABC Rural reported that long-time residents and opal miners in Andamooka described the town as experiencing its worst economic downturn in memory, with only a small number of residents continuing to work in the opal industry. According to the report, local miners stated that the town had become heavily reliant on mining activity, and reductions in mining employment and interest were contributing to concerns about the future of the local community.

In the 2021 census, the town had a population of 262 people. There was a surplus of males (54.1%) over females (45.9%). Their median age was 57 years, nineteen years older than the national median of 38. Children under 15 made up 10.8% of the population, and people aged 65 years and over made up 31.3%. Aboriginal and Torres Strait Islander people made up 4.6% of the population. Most (75.2%) were born in Australia; the following most common countries of birth were England (6.1%), Austria (1.5%), Germany (1.5%), Croatia (1.5%), and Italy (1.1%). The most common religious affiliation was "No Religion" (52.3%), followed by Catholic (17.6%) and non-denominational Christian (4.6%).

Its main industry was mining. Since the establishment of the nearby Olympic Dam copper-uranium mine and the town of Roxby Downs in the 1980s, some residents of Andamooka are now employed in the mine or in Roxby Downs, and many others are retired.

Until recently, Andamooka townsfolk had to rely on water supplies trucked in from Roxby Downs, or above-ground cisterns for the limited rainfall of the region. A pipeline to the township has since been constructed, although water is still trucked to the town's water tanks.

== Health services ==
Andamooka is served by a community health service that provides primary health care, emergency response coordination, referral support and other clinical services to residents of the remote township. The facility is staffed by remote-area nurses and offers scheduled clinic hours, telehealth consultations, and access to 24-hour medical support, with emergency coordination services provided by the Royal Flying Doctor Service (RFDS).

The health service is part of a broader network of remote primary health care services delivered by RFDS in South Australia and the Northern Territory, which focus on providing medical care, telehealth, emergency retrieval support and community health outreach to remote communities without local hospital facilities.

In regional outback communities, RFDS programs also integrate with community clinics and health staffing to support preventive care, chronic disease management, and health education in areas with limited access to other medical infrastructure.

== Housing ==
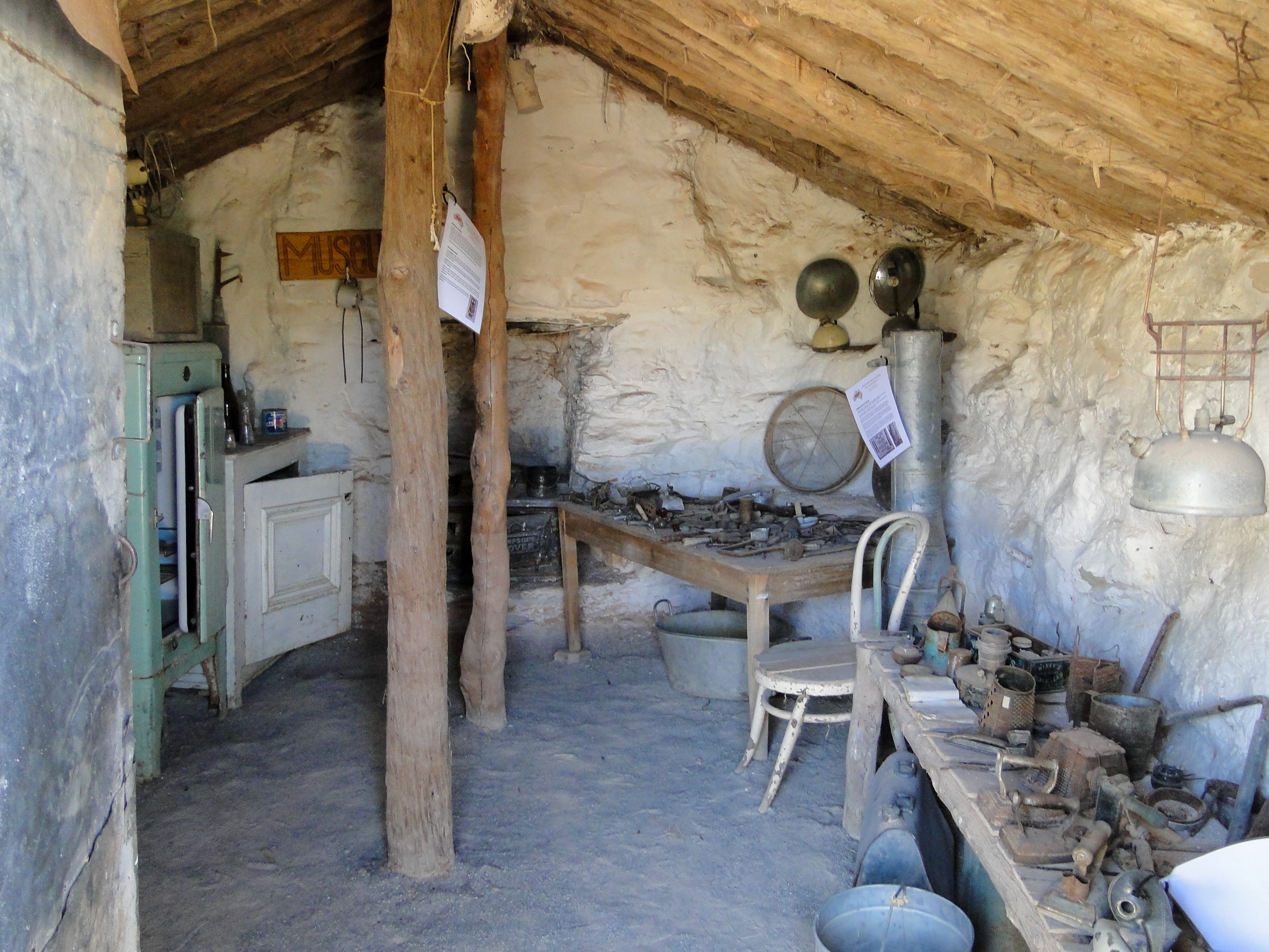
Interior view of Andy Absalom's dugout at Andamooka, South Australia, built c.1934

The earliest miners occupied rough dugouts driven into the side of a hill. The underground portions provided excellent insulation against extreme outdoor temperatures. Because it was unsurveyed, occupancy was determined by a tenuous Miners' Right. That situation deterred capital investment; in the 1970s, Andamooka was essentially a declining shantytown. Civic affairs, such as they were, were organized by a citizens' progress association. Their limited activities were mainly related to electricity generation and supply, and maintaining the dirt airstrip in case the Flying Doctor was needed. All roads were unsealed tracks, while the main street was a dry rocky creek bed (unless there was a rare thunderstorm). There were a few government agencies. Until a police station was opened in 1966, the police made routine weekly visits from Woomera, a mostly military town that supported the Woomera Test Range and Joint Defence Facility Nurrungar. Unless there was an emergency in between these visits, the isolated settlement was self-policing. An establishment named the Tucker Box, a licensed restaurant, served as the social hub. The Andamooka Co-Op Ltd supplied groceries and fuel.

In the 1980s, following the advent and development of the nearby Olympic Dam mine, an influx of workers led to increased housing construction and the transport of additional houses. Many of the town's homes were built during the demobilisation of Woomera. A transformation then took place. Not many people still live in the traditional dugout-style houses of old, although remnants of the town's past remain in the main street, with the cottages of old miners dug into the side of the hill still standing.

== Architecture ==
Early miners in Andamooka constructed semi-dugout homes carved into the rocky hillsides surrounding the settlement. These dwellings provided insulation from the extreme desert climate, remaining cooler during the hot summers and warmer during winter nights.

Semi-dugouts became a distinctive feature of the town's built environment and reflect the improvisational construction methods used by early opal miners working in remote conditions. Similar underground housing traditions later developed in other Australian opal mining towns, including Coober Pedy.

Some of the early miners’ cottages and dugouts are now preserved within the Andamooka Historic Precinct, which is listed on the South Australian Heritage Register.

== Community and civic issues ==
In October 2011, the Australian Broadcasting Corporation reported that residents and representatives had again raised concerns about road access to Andamooka, calling for improvements to the Borefield Loop Track, which links the town to Roxby Downs and Olympic Dam.

In April 2012, reporting by the Australian Broadcasting Corporation noted that the town's population had increased to an estimated 350–400 people, up from around 250 a few years earlier, according to local community representatives; the report described this as a tentative improvement for the remote outback settlement amid ongoing challenges related to isolation and infrastructure.

In April 2012, ABC News reported that about 800 people were living in Andamooka, with local representatives noting that the population was expected to increase further if nearby mining developments proceeded; this figure contrasted with later census counts as the town's demographics shifted over time.

In August 2015, the Andamooka Progress and Opal Miners Association (APOMA) and the community called for the maintenance and upgrade of the Borefield Loop Track linking Andamooka with Olympic Dam and Roxby Downs following the shelving of the Olympic Dam expansion, as reported by ABC News.

In March 2018, APOMA and residents of Andamooka made a public appeal for the construction of a community swimming pool, citing concerns about heat and limited recreational facilities in the outback township. The call for a pool was discussed at local meetings and highlighted in Australian Broadcasting Corporation media coverage, illustrating local efforts to address community infrastructure needs in a remote environment.

== Arts and Events ==
Creative activity forms part of community life in several towns across Outback South Australia. The Arts Strategy for Outback South Australia, released by the Outback Communities Authority in 2026, recognizes that arts and cultural activity contribute to community wellbeing, regional identity, and cultural tourism in remote communities.

Consultations undertaken during the development of the strategy included discussions with community representatives in several outback towns, including Andamooka, reflecting the presence of local artistic activity and cultural initiatives within the opal-mining settlement.

Although best known for its opal mining heritage, Andamooka has developed a small local arts scene influenced by the surrounding desert landscape and mining culture. Creative activity in the town includes sculpture, painting, stone carving, and jewellery made from locally mined opal. Artistic spaces and projects associated with the community include Cal the Stoner's Outdoor Intricarved Stone Sculpture Studio, Underground Art Gallery, and arts initiatives that interpret the cultural and geological history of the opal fields.

Community arts events and projects have also been linked to tourism in the region, reflecting broader efforts across Outback South Australia to develop arts-related visitor experiences and creative industries in remote communities.

=== Floods of Fire ===
Floods of Fire was a large-scale performance presented during the 2024 Adelaide Festival. Commissioned and led by the Adelaide Symphony Orchestra, the program invited artists from remote regions of South Australia to recreate experiences of extreme weather events through performance as part of the festival's broader programming. A group from Andamooka, known as the Opal Eyes Theatre Production company, was selected to contribute a performance interpreting the town's experience of flooding in January 2022, when the main road was blocked for two weeks. The puppet show segment involving the Andamooka group was staged at the Adelaide Festival in March 2024.

=== Opal Evolution Festival ===
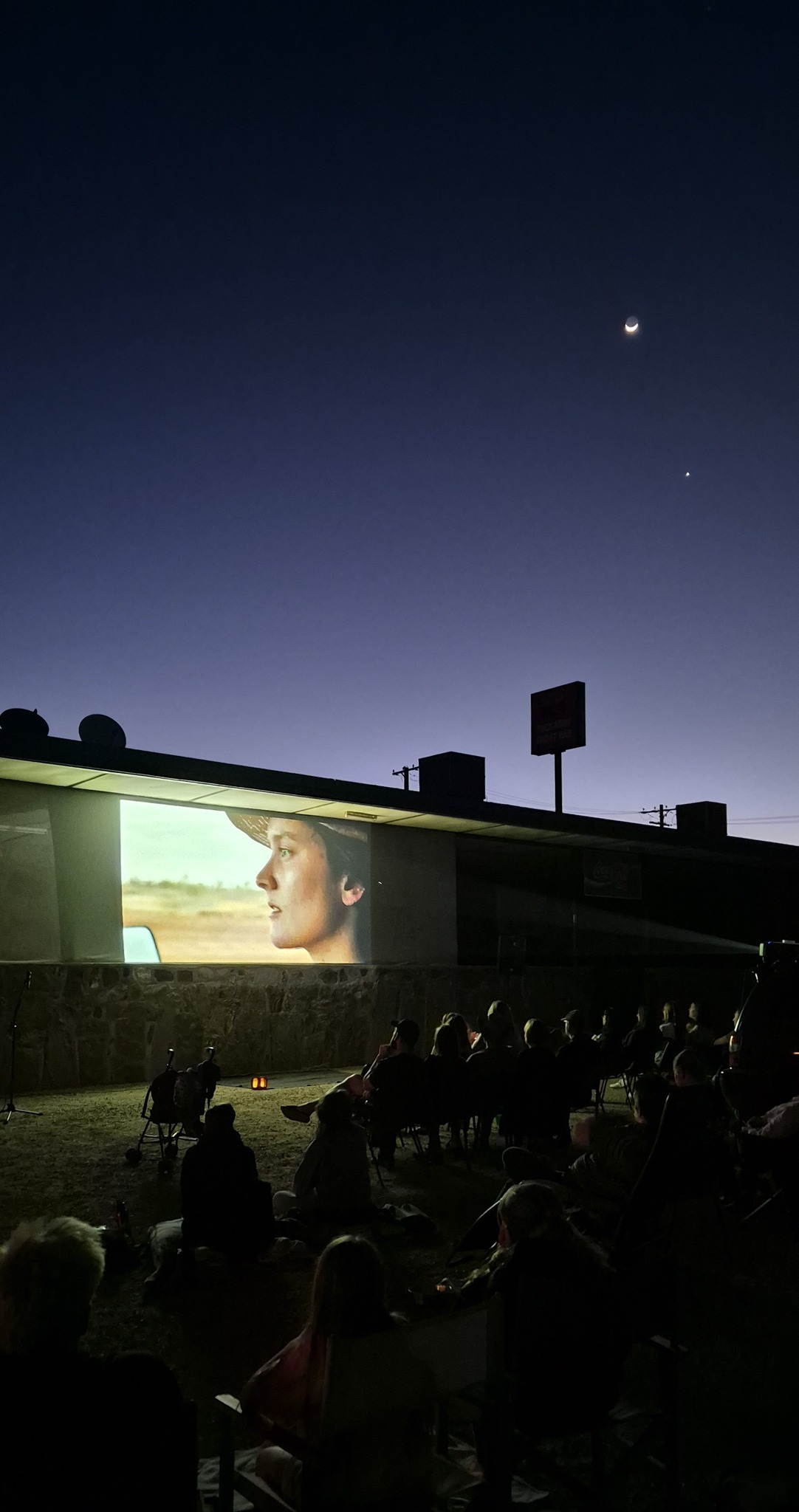
Outdoor film screening in Andamooka, South Australia, 2024.

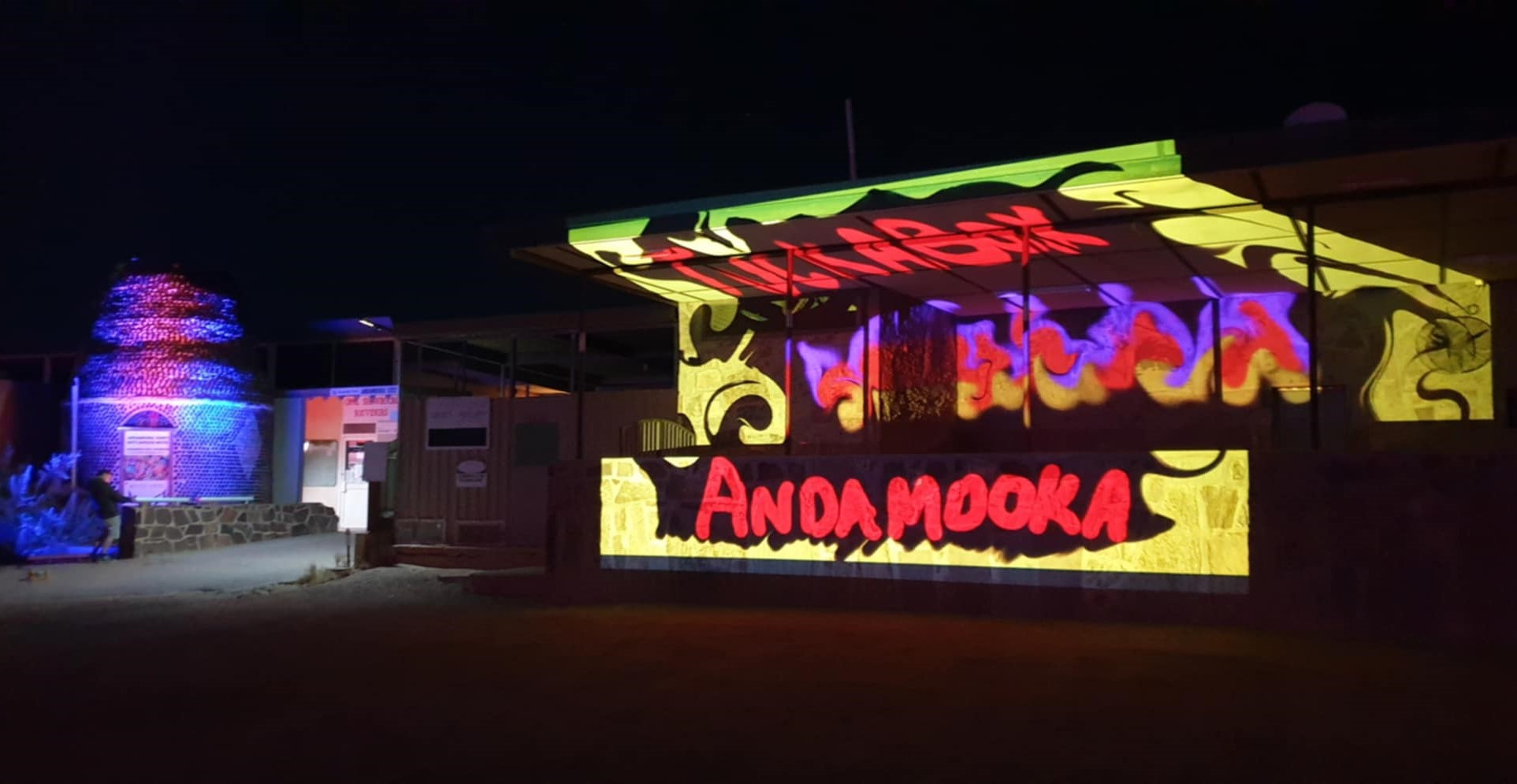
Light projection installation on the former Tuckabox Hotel, Andamooka, South Australia, 2024.

The Opal Evolution Festival is an arts and community event held in Andamooka, South Australia. First presented in October 2024, the festival features visual arts, light installations, workshops, and public programs that explore the region's opal heritage, geology, and cultural landscape.

The event has been listed as part of regional cultural programming in South Australia's Flinders Ranges and Outback, including in public event calendars and arts initiatives.

Programming has included collaborations with artists and community participants, with activities staged in outdoor and underground spaces characteristic of the town's opal-mining environment

=== 2027 Australian Opal Symposium ===
Plans for the Opal Evolution Festival include staging the 2027 Australian Opal Symposium during the October Long Weekend, described as a forum to bring together participants from the opal industry, including miners, traders, researchers, and artists, to discuss developments in the sector.

== Pop culture ==
=== Film ===
The feature film Andamooka (2024) is an Australian drama written and directed by Mara Jean Quinn. The story follows a woman whose life unravels shortly before her 30th birthday, who travels to the outback to spend her milestone in the opal-mining town of Andamooka as part of a cross-country journey. The film was shot on location across remote areas, including Andamooka, and reflects aspects of road travel through central Australia. It was completed in 2024 and has screened at several film festivals, including CinefestOZ and other regional and international festivals, before becoming available on various digital platforms.

The 1979 film The Last of the Knucklemen filmed its exterior shots in and around Andamooka.

Andamooka opal is mentioned in the television series Futurama.

Andamooka was also referenced in the Max Brooks novel, World War Z.

== Minnie Berrington ==
Minnie Berrington was an English opal miner and a pioneering figure in the Australian opal fields. Born in London, she travelled to Australia in the early 20th century. She became involved in opal mining in the Andamooka fields at a time when the industry was predominantly male-dominated. According to the Australian Broadcasting Corporation reporting, Berrington worked tenaciously as a miner, gaining recognition for her resilience and efforts in the remote outback community. She has been described in independent profiles as a trailblazer who challenged social expectations of her era by establishing herself as a successful opal miner and contributor to the cultural heritage of the Andamooka region.

== See also ==
- Andamooka Airport
