= Andamooka Airport =

Airport in South Australia

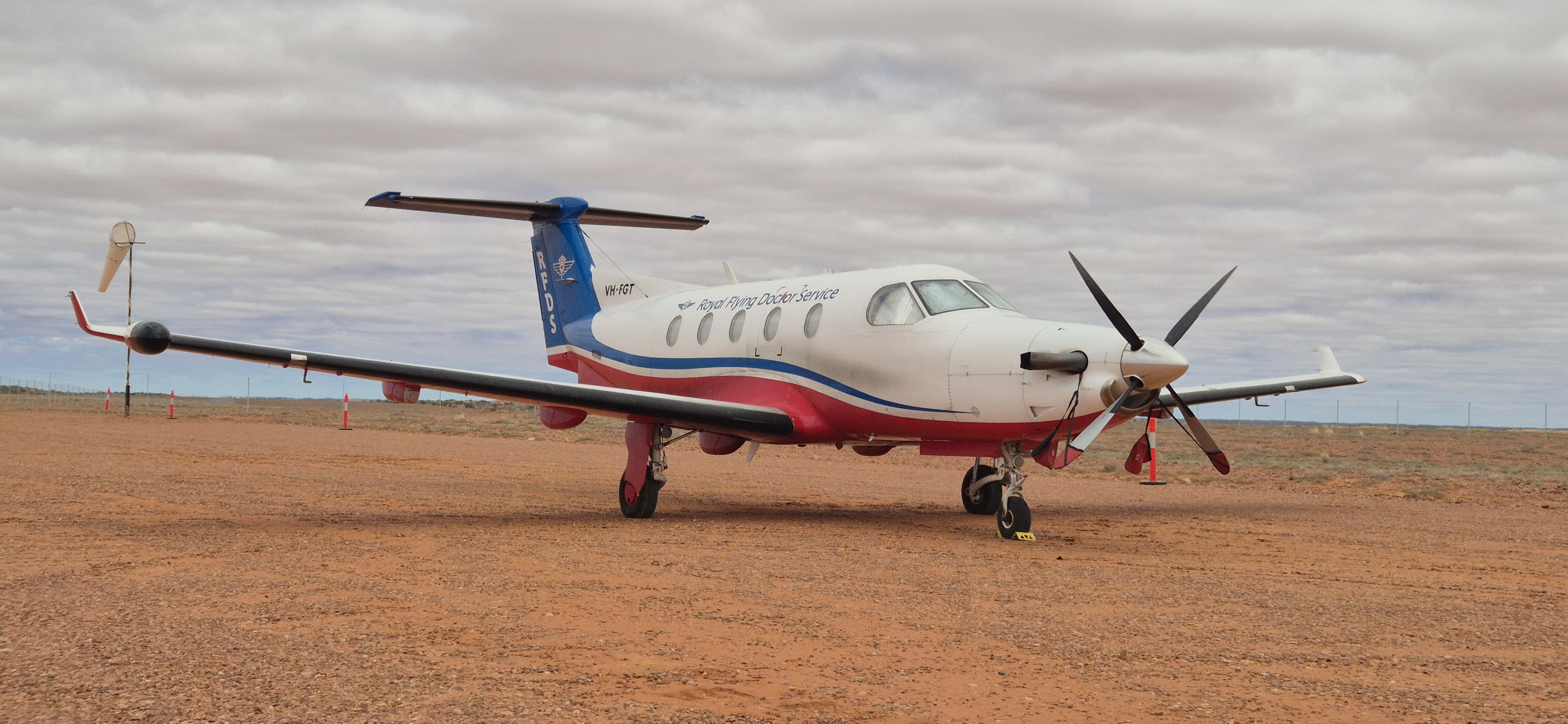
- Pilatus PC-12 VH-FGT operated by the Royal Flying Doctor Service parked at Andamooka Airport, South Australia, February 2026.
- IATA: ADO; ICAO: YAMK

Summary
- Airport type: Public
- Owner/Operator: Andamooka Opal Fields Tourism Association
- Location: Andamooka, South Australia, Australia
- Elevation AMSL: 250 ft / 76 m
- Coordinates: 30°26′18″S 137°08′12″E

Map
- Location in South Australia

Runways
| Direction | Length | | Surface |
| Direction | m | ft | Surface |
|---|---|---|---|
| 06/24 | 1,210 | 3,970 | Dirt |
- Sources: AIP

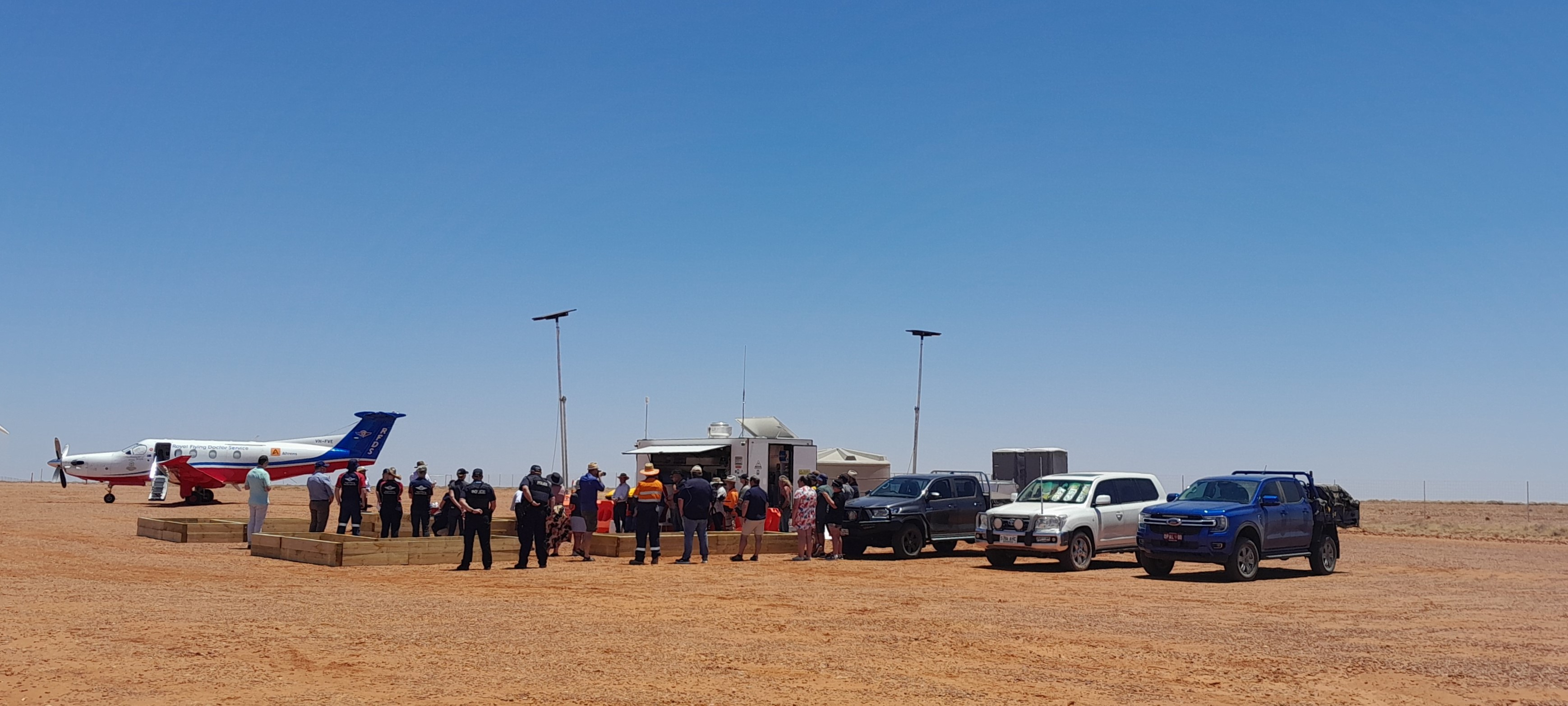
Royal Flying Doctor Service aircraft at Andamooka Airport (YAMK), South Australia, 2026

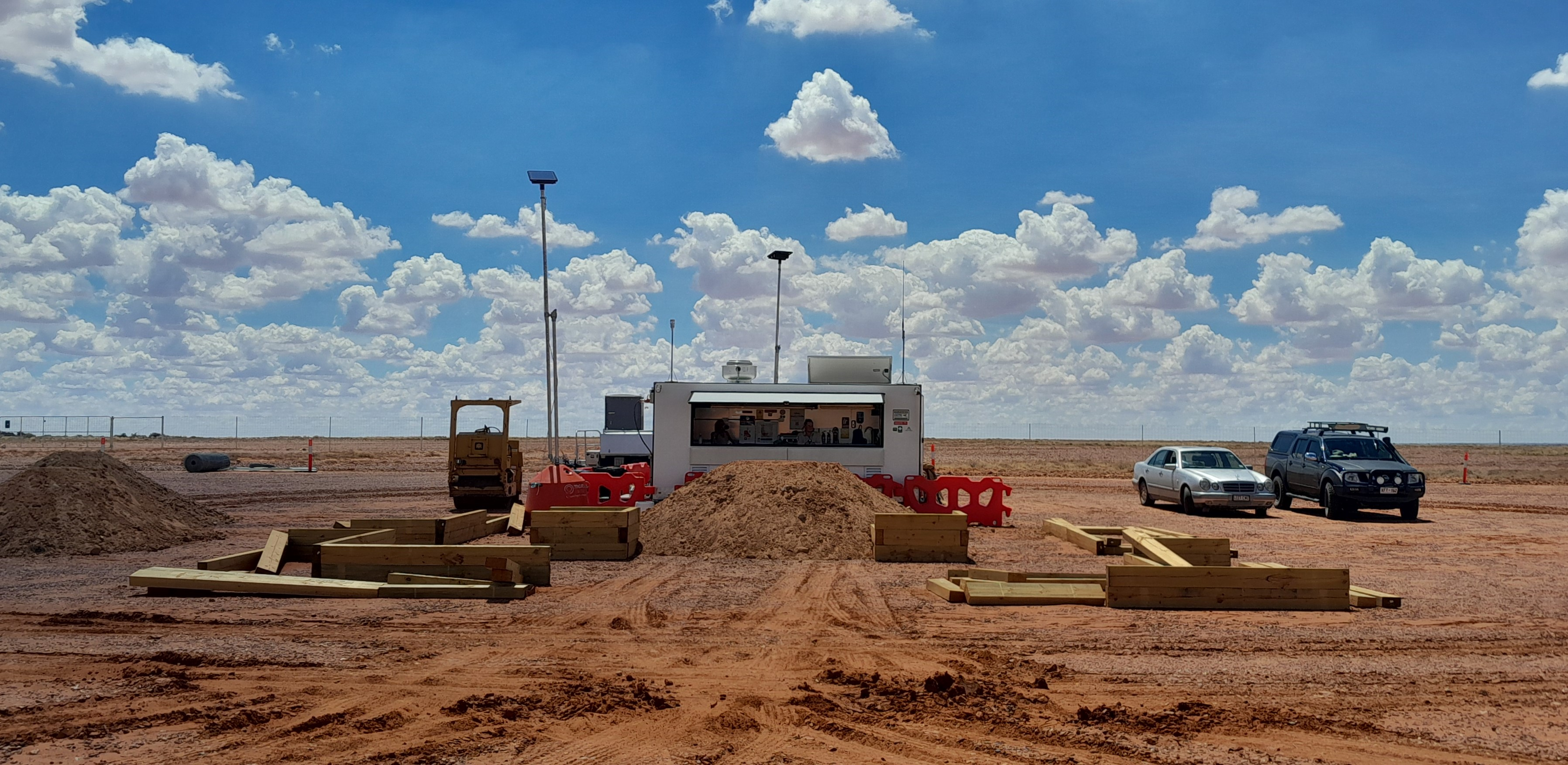
Andamooka Airport Infrastructure

Andamooka Airport (IATA: ADO, ICAO: YAMK) is a public-use aerodrome located near Andamooka, South Australia. The airport supports regional aviation operations, including medical, emergency, and private aircraft movements.

The runway (06/24) is 1,210 metres long, with 100-metre clearways, and is unsealed. The facility includes solar-powered runway lighting, a remote weather station and live monitoring systems.

The airport became operational for Royal Flying Doctor Service (RFDS) operations on 30 June 2025. Since that time, RFDS aircraft have utilised the airstrip for patient transfers and medical support to the Andamooka community.

The airport was formally opened on 21 January 2026 by Joe Szakacs, Minister for Trade and Investment, Industry, Innovation and Science, Local Government and Veterans Affairs, alongside Geoff Brock, Independent Member for Stuart.

In 2026, the Andamooka Opal Fields Tourism Association received funding through the Royal Automobile Association of South Australia (RAA) Regional Safety Grants program to purchase a multi-tyre roller for maintaining the local airstrip and access roads after rain.

In 2026, the Andamooka Opal Fields Tourism Association (AOFTA) received funding through the South Australian Department of Human Services 2025–26 Supporting Regional and Remote Volunteers program to assist with volunteer training and operational support at the local airfield.I

== See also ==
- List of airports in South Australia
