= Andrew Liveris =

Australian businessman

Andrew Liveris AO
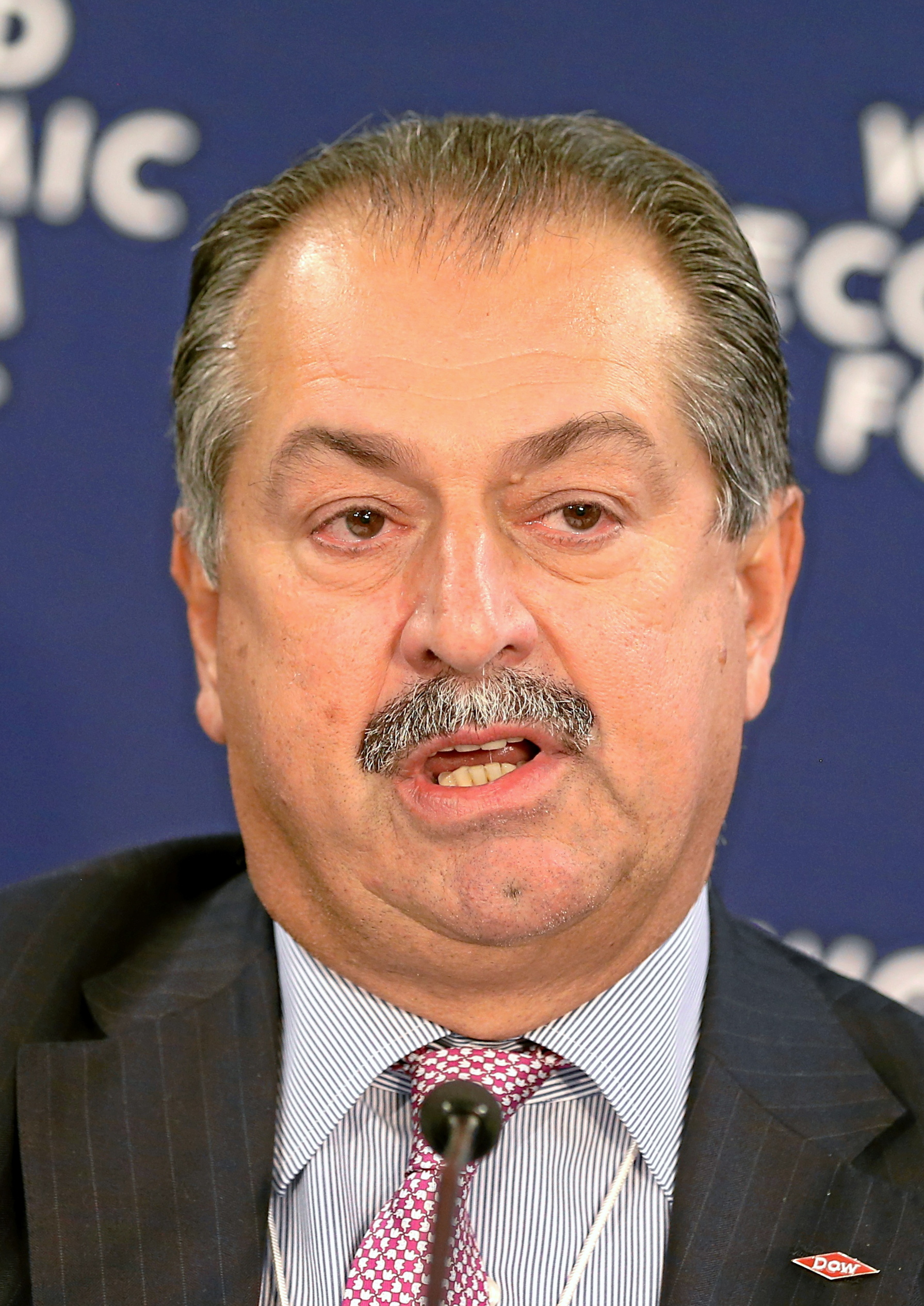
- Liveris at the World Economic Forum Annual Meeting in 2013

President of the Brisbane Organising Committee for the 2032 Olympic and Paralympic Games
- Incumbent
- Assumed office 27 August 2028
- Leader: Kirsty Coventry
- Preceding: Casey Wasserman (Los Angeles 2028)

President of the Brisbane Organising Committee for the 2032 Olympic and Paralympic Games
- Incumbent
- Assumed office 11 April 2022
- Preceded by: Position established

Personal details
- Born: Andrew N. Liveris Darwin, Northern Territory, Australia
- Spouse: Paula Liveris
- Education: University of Queensland
- Occupation: CEO and chairman of The Dow Chemical Company Chairman of Lucid Motors
- Website: Biography page

Andrew N. Liveris AO is an Australian former CEO and chairman of The Dow Chemical Company of Midland, Michigan. Liveris has served as a member of Dow's board of directors since February 2004, CEO since November 2004, and, was elected as chairman of the board effective 1 April 2006. Liveris became CEO in 2004 after holding the position of chief operating officer (COO). Afterwards, he served as executive chairman of DowDuPont. He is the chairman of the board of Lucid Motors.

== Early life and education ==
Andrew N. Liveris was born in Darwin, Australia. He is the grandson of Greek immigrants from the island of Kastellorizo and identifies strongly with his Greek heritage. He attended Darwin High School, then moved to Brisbane, where he continued his education at Brisbane State High School.

He earned a bachelor's degree (first-class-honours) in Chemical Engineering from the University of Queensland.

== Business career ==
Liveris began his career at Dow Chemical in 1976 in Melbourne, Australia. He spent much of his career in Asia before moving to North America, with roles in manufacturing, engineering, sales, marketing, and business and general management. Liveris spent 14 years in Hong Kong and served as Dow's general manager in Thailand before becoming head of Dow's entire Asia-Pacific operations.

Liveris joined Dow's board of directors in February 2004 and became the CEO in November 2004. Liveris, appointed CEO in 2004 after the board of directors unanimously selected him in part based upon his plan to transform Dow, began to implement the new strategy.

His election to chairman of the board became effective on 1 April 2006. His predecessor was William S. Stavropoulos.

=== Rohm and Haas acquisition ===
Liveris' strongest move to implement the strategy came with the purchase of Rohm and Haas in the summer of 2008 for $16.2 billion. This Fortune 500 company, a leader in specialty chemicals, was the subject of a global auction, which Dow won with a bid of $16.2 billion. The acquisition proved to be synergistic in terms of growth, allowing a broader and deeper presentation to clients with regard to value-added chemicals, plastics, and materials, but also in terms of costs.

The acquisition closed during the 2008 financial crisis. The credit crisis caused one of Dow's joint venture partners, Petrochemical Industries Company (PIC) of the State of Kuwait, a wholly owned subsidiary of Kuwait Petroleum Corporation (KPC), to withdraw from a planned partnership in basic plastics, despite an agreed contract, depriving Dow of $9 billion in proceeds designated to fund the Rohm and Haas deal. The London-based International Court of Arbitration ruled in March 2012 to award Dow $2.16 Billion plus costs and interest from Kuwait due to its cancellation of the 2008 agreement.

In March 2009, Liveris and his management team organised a plan to implement the Rohm and Haas integration, focusing on growth and cost synergies, but also reducing costly debt from the transaction through public offerings, along with equity offers. The plan also called for the divestiture of non-strategic assets, which was accomplished through a sales process that assured maximum valuation.

=== Later time as CEO ===
In 2015, auditors at Dow challenged what they said was improper spending by Liveris. Auditors testified that he used the company's Customer Events Department for personal events including family events and various services. The Liveris family subsequently repaid several hundred thousand dollars to Dow. The head of the auditing department retracted the annual auditing reports for multiple years due to concerns about inaccurate reporting to the SEC and shareholders.

In March 2017, he said the ban on onshore gas exploration by the Victorian Government in Australia was "nonsense," and that he offered "Dow’s unfettered help with no intended positives for Dow" in learning extraction techniques.

In April 2017, Dow said that it was considering retaining Liveris beyond his planned retirement on 30 June 2017, to help oversee the planned merger between Dow and DuPont. In May, Dow said that Liveris would retire from the DowDuPont company in mid-2018, serving as executive chairman until between April and July 2018. He stepped down from his executive positions at DowDuPont on 1 April 2018, remaining a director. He remained chairman and CEO of The Dow Chemical Company. After his retirement, Liveris outlined plans to author several books and remain tangentially active with Dow. He also said he would join the board of Saudi Aramco. He toured Dow facilities in 12 countries in June 2018 and was also at the opening of the Andrew N. Liveris Visitors and Heritage Center in Midland.

=== Manufacturing council ===
In December 2016, Liveris was named by Donald Trump to lead his American Manufacturing Council. Liveris said Trump created a climate that is conducive to business effectiveness for his company. On 27 January 2017, Trump publicly announced the names of the 28 members to make up the council, with Liveris heading the Manufacturing Jobs Initiative.

While Liveris was chairman and CEO of Dow Chemical, the company donated $1 million to Trump's presidential inauguration. In 2017, the Associated Press reported that Dow was pressuring the Trump administration to ignore risk assessment studies about the harms of pesticides.

=== Brisbane 2032 Olympic Organising Committee ===
In 2022, Liveris was chosen to lead the organizing committee for the 2032 Summer Olympics and Paralympic Games in Brisbane.

== Writing ==
Liveris is the author of Make it in America: The Case for Re-Inventing the Economy (first published in 2011, updated in 2012). Liveris argues that a healthy manufacturing sector is essential to creating jobs. Failing to support American manufacturing, as well as research and development, undermines America's potential to engage in new growth sectors such as clean energy and nanotechnology.

== Memberships ==
Liveris has served on the board of directors of the battery company Novonix, IBM, Saudi Aramco, Worley, Lucid Motors (chairman as of 2021).

He is on the advisory board of Sumitomo Mitsui Banking Corporation, Teneo (a global CEO consulting and advisory firm), and NEOM (an initiative driven by Saudi Vision 2030). He is Chairman of the BlackRock Long Term Capital and a special advisor to the Public Investment Fund (PIF) and the Crown Prince of Saudi Arabia. and a member of the executive committee of the Business Roundtable. Liveris is also a former president of the International Council of Chemical Associations.

He served as vice-chairman of The Business Council for 2011 and 2012, and as chairman for 2013 and 2014. He is a member of the Peterson Institute for International Economics, and the American Australian Association.

Liveris is on the board of trustees for the United States Council for International Business and is a trustee of the California Institute of Technology. Liveris is a member of the Business Advisory Board for the University of Technology Sydney (UTS) Business School. In April 2012 he became a member of the Special Olympics International board of directors.

Liveris collaborated with Muhtar Kent, chairman and CEO of The Coca-Cola Company, George David, chairman of the Coca-Cola Hellenic Bottling Company, and George Stamas, partner at Kirkland and Ellis LLP, to found The Hellenic Initiative (THI), a non-profit, non-governmental organization to encourage entrepreneurship and job-creation investments in Greece.

The $250 billion Saudi Arabia Public Investment Fund (PIF) appointed Andrew Liveris as a special adviser on matters of strategic importance, to assist the fund in efforts to boost the value of its portfolio and ensure the contribution of PIF companies to Saudi Arabia's economic vision program 2030. He has also joined the board of Australia's WorleyParsons. WorleyParsons (WOR) chairman John Grill said Liveris' "breadth of global leadership experience" in the US and Middle East will enhance the abilities of its board.

== Awards and recognition ==
- 2005: Honorary doctorate in science from University of Queensland; also Alumnus of the Year
- 2010, 2012, and 2013: named No. 1 Power Player in the global chemical markets by ICIS Chemical Business magazine
- 2011: George E. Davis Medal, Institution of Chemical Engineers (IChemE).
- 2011: Distinguished Performance Award for Excellence in Public Policy from the Committee for Economic Development
- 2011: International Leadership Award from the United States Council for International Business (USCIB)
- 2011: Legend in Leadership from the Yale Chief Executive Leadership Institute at the Yale School of Management
- 2011: CEO of the year, Platts Global Energy Awards
- February 2012: Archbishop Iakovos Leadership 100 Award for Excellence
- March 2012: Aristeio Award in Business from the American Hellenic Council
- March 2012: Foreign co-chair at the China Development Forum in Beijing, representing more than 200 overseas delegates including the leaders of more than 70 Fortune 500 companies, international organisations, senior officials and internationally renowned scholars
- August 2012: Named by The Australian Financial Review to the BOSS list of True Leaders.
- 2013: International Palladium Medal of the Société de Chimie Industrielle (announced in 2012)
- March 2013: Chemical Industry Medal from the Society of Chemical Industry (SCI)
- May 2013: Eisenhower Award by Business Executives for National Security (BENS) at a ceremony in Washington, D.C.
- January 2014: Appointed Officer of the Order of Australia (AO) in the 2014 Australia Day Honours, "for distinguished service to international business through senior roles with multinational organisations, as a supporter of Australia-US educational and cultural relations, and to the community."

== Personal ==
Liveris and his wife Paula have three adult children, including Anthony Liveris, founder of the data analytics firm Applecart. His daughter, Alexandra, is a filmmaker. As of 2018, Liveris and his wife travel between their homes in Australia and Midland, Michigan.

Sporting positions
Preceded by (United States) Casey Wasserman	President of Organizing Committee for Summer Olympic Games; 2032	Succeeded by TBD
