= Bungala Solar Power Farm =

Solar power farm in South Australia

- Country: Australia
- Location: northeast of Port Augusta, South Australia
- Coordinates: 32.42°S 137.84°E
- Status: Operational
- Construction began: 2017
- Commission date: September 2018
- Construction cost: US$315m
- Owners: Enel Green Power and Dutch Infrastructure Fund

Solar farm
- Type: Flat-panel PV
- Collectors: 420,000
- Site area: 800 hectares (2,000 acres)

Power generation
- Nameplate capacity: 220 MW
- Annual net output: 570 GW·h

External links
- Website: www.enelgreenpower.com/country-australia/bungala

The Bungala Solar Power Farm is a 220 MW solar power farm in Emeroo and Wami Kata near Port Augusta in South Australia. The first stage was connected to the grid in May 2018, and the second stage was connected to the grid in November 2018. The project gradually reached full power in 2020.

== History ==
It was expected to be completed and the two stages together able to deliver 220 MW of electric power to the national grid from November 2018. It is being developed on 800 hectares (2,000 acres) of land which was previously used as an ostrich farm, sheep and cattle station and is owned by the Bungala Aboriginal Corporation, a community employment and social services organisation. The completed project could contribute 220 MWac to the 132 kV electricity grid from 275 MWdc generation and expects to produce 570 GWh per year.

A professional training project is being set up to provide new skills and experience to 70 Aboriginal job seekers as part of the project. It will train them in operations and maintenance for stage 1 and construction of phase 2 of the project.

== Construction ==
The development is on a 19th-century ostrich farm, later used for grazing sheep and cattle, and spans the boundary between the localities of Emeroo and Wami Kata.

The project is being built in stages. Stages 1 and 2 will produce a combined 220 MW of electricity. They were developed by Reach Energy and sold to a joint venture of Enel Green Power and Dutch Infrastructure Fund. The builder was Elecnor. Stage 3 is not scheduled to be built by 2024 but could include another 80 MW of generation, or 300 MW battery storage. Stage 3 was to be built if the company won a contract to supply electricity to the state government, however this contract was won by Aurora Solar Thermal Power Project. The entire output of stages 1 and 2 will be bought by Origin Energy.

Civil engineering and construction on site was managed by Catcon. The Construction, Forestry, Mining and Energy Union accused the construction company of unsafe work practices when a construction worker was crushed by equipment on site in February 2018.

As the site is 300 kilometres (190 mi) from the state capital of Adelaide where planning approval is granted, there had been some local issues that were not well understood in Adelaide. These related to dust during construction and ongoing contributions into the local economy once construction is complete. The state Planning Commission visited the site in July 2018.

The first supply of electricity from one section of 45 MW was connected to the National Electricity Market in May 2018. The entire first phase of the project was commissioned in September and the second phase of the Bungala Solar Project started feeding electricity into the grid in October 2018. Technical issues delayed the project finish until 2020.

The Emeroo grid battery proposed at the site received one government approval in 2025. It is scheduled to cost $400 million, with 225 megawatt (MW) and 900 megawatt hour (MWh) by 2027.

== Size and operation ==
The Bungala Solar Power Farm is one of the largest solar farms in Australia. It covers 2000 acres.

Phase One has a Max-to-Registered-Capacity ratio of 1:1.23, as the panels are 135 MW DC and the inverters are 110 MW AC. Along with solar tracking, this yields a capacity factor of 25%, of one the highest in Australia. In 2022, it earned $145 per kW capacity.
