= Louise Adams (civil engineer) =

Australian engineer and business executive

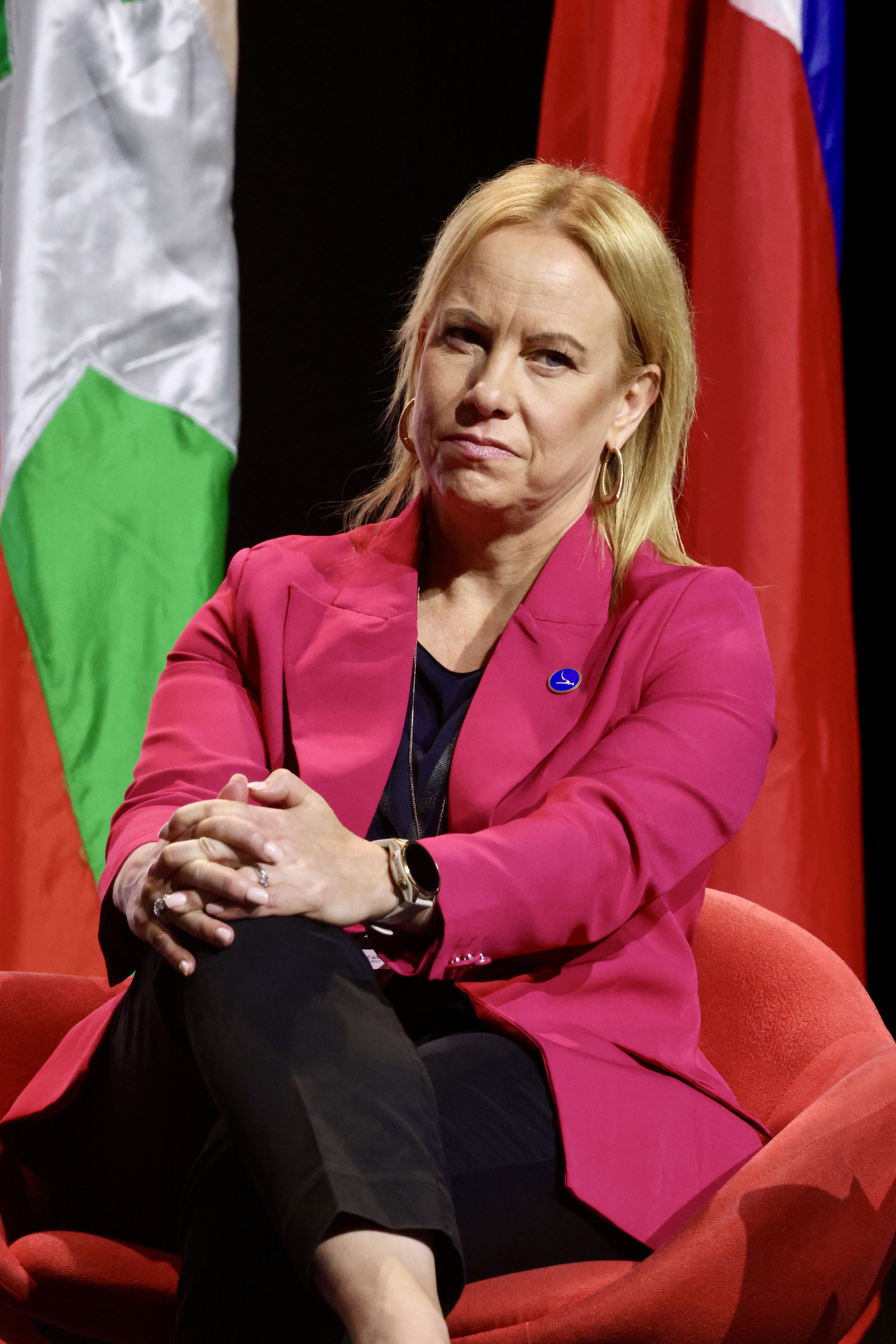
Adams in 2025

Louise Adams is an Australian civil engineer. As of April 2023, she is Aurecon's chief operating officer.

== Early life and education ==
Louise Adams graduated from the Wharton Business School in 2018, through the Chief Executive Women scholarship.

== Career ==
Adams has worked as a civil engineer for over 25 years.

She served as the chief executive for Australia and New Zealand at Aurecon, overseeing a workforce of 4,300 people. In 2013, Adams became the first woman to serve as executive director on Aurecon's Global Board and is Aurecon's global spokesperson for Women in Leadership. As of April 2023, Aurecon's chief operating officer. Previously

Adams said the engineering sector has a "significant lack of cultural and gender diversity." She said, "For decades, our industry has been positioned as a male-centric profession. Promoted with images of hard hats and heavy machinery, a profession most suited to men. I believe this has narrowed our thinking and perspectives, created a gender imbalance, siloed cultural profiles, and stifled potential for diversity of thought and, in turn, innovation."

== Recognition ==
In 2020, Adams was awarded Australian CEO of the Year by The CEO Magazine.

In 2021, she was recognised as a Deakin University Alumni of the Year.

In November 2021, Adams was elected a fellow of the Australian Academy of Technology and Engineering.

In 2023, the Australia-Vietnam Policy Institute made her the Australian Business Champion to Vietnam.
