= Brisbane Organising Committee for the 2032 Olympic and Paralympic Games =

Australian statutory authority

- Type: Statutory authority
- Headquarters: Brisbane, Queensland, Australia
- President: Andrew Liveris
- CEO: Cindy Hook

The Brisbane Organising Committee for the 2032 Olympic and Paralympic Games (BNEOCOG) was established by the Brisbane Olympic and Paralympic Games Arrangements Act 2021 passed by the Queensland Parliament in December 2021. It is a statutory authority and its role is "to plan, organise and deliver the Olympic and Paralympic Games in accordance with the host contract".

The legislation outlines the functions and board composition of the Organising Committee. At least 50% of the nominated directors holding office must be women. It is likely that the board will change between 2021 and 2032 due to changes in roles and term limitations.

Prior to Brisbane winning the right to host the 2032 Olympics and Paralympics, the federal government committed to fund half the costs of critical infrastructure with the Queensland Government. An Olympic Infrastructure Agency would be established with shared governance arrangements and oversee all projects from the planning, scoping and design phase through to contracting, construction and delivery.

== Board ==
Brisbane Olympic and Paralympic Games Arrangements Act 2021 outlines the composition and criteria of the board members. The appointment of president and vice presidents is outlined in the act. In July 2025, Crisafulli Government reduced the board from 24 to 15 members and from six vice presidents to two.

Representation Determined by Legislation	Name Appointment Period
President (Independent)	Andrew Liveris (2022– )
Vice President (Australian Government nominee)	Anika Wells (2025– )
Vice President (Queensland Government nominee)	Tim Mander (2025– )
Australian Olympic Committee President	Ian Chesterman (Vice President 2022–2025; Member 2025–)
Paralympics Australia President	Jock O'Callaghan (Vice President 2021–2023), Alison Creagh (Vice President 2023–2025), Grant Mizens (Member 2025– )
Australian Olympic Committee Honorary Life President	John Coates (Vice President 2021–2025, Member 2025–)
International Olympic Committee Member from Australia	Jessica Fox (2024– )
International Paralympic Committee Governing board members from Australia	Robyn Smith (2021–)
Olympic athlete	Bronte Barratt (2021–2024), Georgia Baker (2024–)
Paralympic athlete	Kurt Fearnley (2021–2025), Angie Ballard (2026– )
Independent Directors includes President (three).	Andrew Liveris (President 2022–2025), Rob Scott (2022–2025), Sarah Kelly (2022–2025), Brett Clark (2022–2025), Shelley Reyes (2022–2025), Rebecca Frizelle (2021–), Greg Norman (2025–). Reduced from five to three in July 2025.
Brisbane City Council nominee	Adrian Schrinner (Vice President 2021–2025, Member 2025–)
Sunshine Coast Council nominee'	Rosanna Natoli (2025– )
Gold Coast City Council nominee'	Tom Tate (2024– )

Board positions removed in July 2025.

Representation Determined by Legislation	Name Appointment Period
Australian Olympic Committee Chief Executive	Matt Carroll (2021–2025), Mark Arbib (2025 ). AOC CEO position removed from Board in July 2025.
Prime Minister of Australia nominees (four)	Richard Colbeck (Minister for Sport 2021–2022), Ted O'Brien (2021–2022), Tracy Stockwell (2021–2025), Rebecca Frizelle (2021–2025), Anika Wells (Vice President / Minister for Sport 2022–2025), Graham Perrett (2022–2025), Greg Norman (2025) Prime Minister nominees removed from the Board in July 2025.
Queensland Premier nominees (four)	Annastacia Palaszczuk (Vice President 2022–2023), Steven Miles (Vice President/Premier/ Deputy Premier 2022–2024), Patrick Johnson (2022–2025), Natalie Cook (2022–2025), Jarrod Bleijie (Vice President 2024–2025), Tim Mander (2024–2025). Queensland Premier nominees removed from the Board in July 2025.
Brisbane Lord Mayor nominee. Changed to Sunshine Coast Council nominee in 2025.	Karen Williams (Redland City Council 2021–2022), Clare Stewart (2022–2024) Teresa Harding (2024–2025)

== Management ==
In December 2022, Cindy Hook was appointed chief executive officer.
