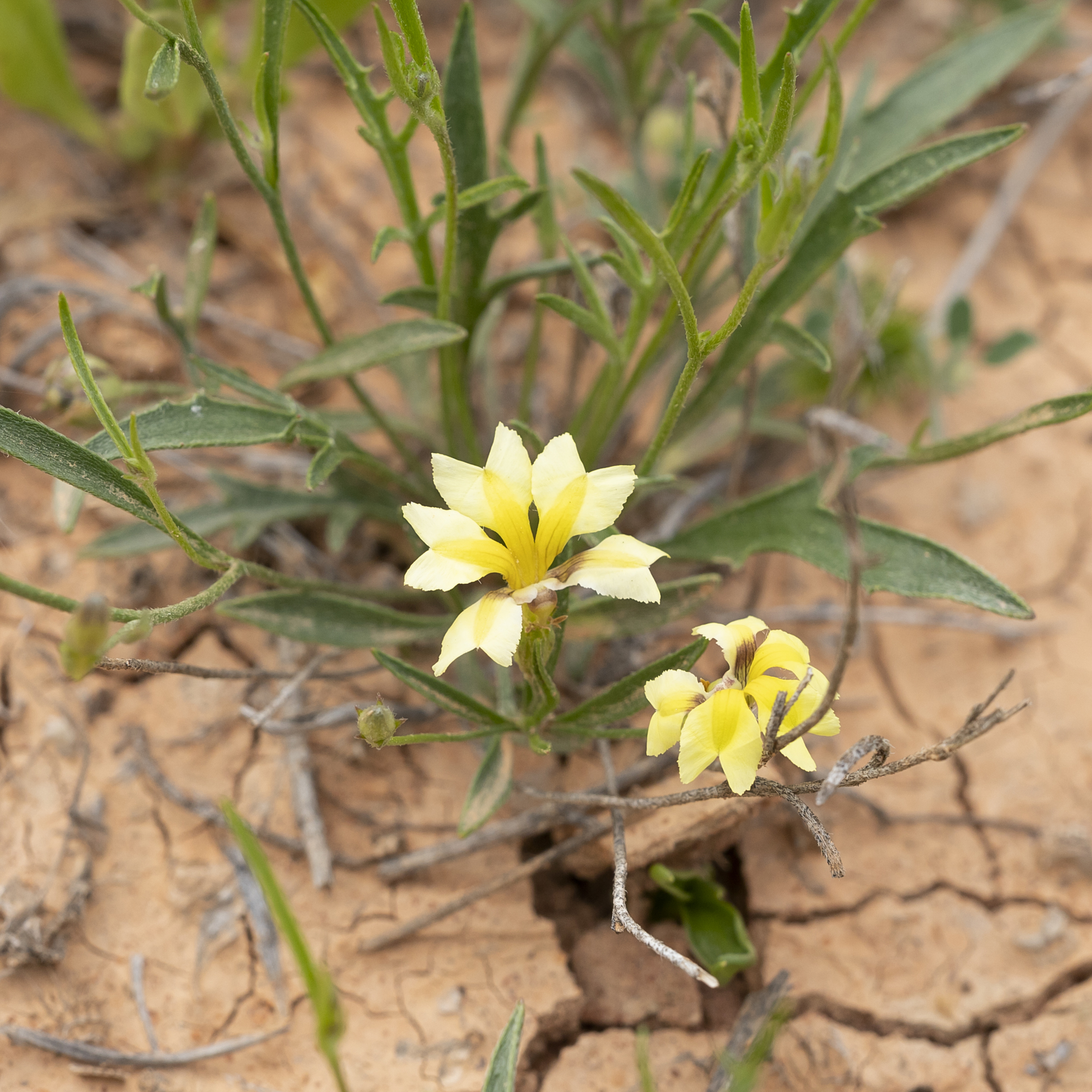
- Goodenia lunata near Carriewerloo

Scientific classification
- Kingdom: Plantae
- Clade: Tracheophytes
- Clade: Angiosperms
- Clade: Eudicots
- Clade: Asterids
- Order: Asterales
- Family: Goodeniaceae
- Genus: Goodenia
- Species: G. lunata

Binomial name
- Goodenia lunata J.M.Black

Synonyms
- Goodenia argentea J.M.Black

= Goodenia lunata =

Stiff goodenia

Species of plant

Goodenia lunata, commonly known as stiff goodenia, is a species of flowering plant in the family Goodeniaceae and is endemic to inland Australia. It is an ascending or low-lying herb with linear to egg-shaped leaves, small racemes of yellow flowers, and more or less spherical fruit.

== Description ==
Goodenia lunata is an ascending or low-lying herb that typically grows to a height of 25 cm (9.8 in). The leaves at the base of the plant are linear to egg-shaped, 40–120 mm (1.6–4.7 in) long and 6–30 mm (0.24–1.18 in) wide with teeth or lobes on the edges. The flowers are arranged in leafy or small racemes, each flower on a pedicel 1–4 mm (0.039–0.157 in) long. The sepals are lance-shaped, 2.5–3.5 mm (0.098–0.138 in) long and the corolla is yellow, 8–14 mm (0.31–0.55 in) long with downy hairs on the back and centre. The lower lobes of the corolla are 4–5 mm (0.16–0.20 in) long with wings about 3 mm (0.12 in) wide. Flowering mainly occurs from March to September, and the fruit is more or less spherical capsule 9–10 mm (0.35–0.39 in) in diameter.

== Taxonomy and naming ==
Goodenia lunata was first formally described in 1927 by John McConnell Black in the Transactions and Proceedings of the Royal Society of South Australia. In 1990, Roger Charles Carolin selected the specimens collected by John Burton Cleland at Cordillo Downs as the lectotype, noting the poor condition of the type specimens. The specific epithet (lunata) means "crescent-shaped", referring to part of the fruit.

== Distribution and habitat ==
Stiff goodenia grows in a variety of communities in inland Australia, often on grassy plains but also near watercourses and roadsides. It is mostly found in the Northern Territory, South Australia and Queensland, but also in scattered populations in Western Australia, New South Wales and Victoria.

== Conservation status ==
The goodenia is listed as of "least concern" under the Queensland Government Nature Conservation Act 1992 and the Northern Territory Government Territory Parks and Wildlife Conservation Act 1976, but as "Priority One" by the Government of Western Australia Department of Parks and Wildlife and as "vulnerable" under the Victorian Government Flora and Fauna Guarantee Act 1988.
