= Angie Ballard =

Australian Paralympic athlete

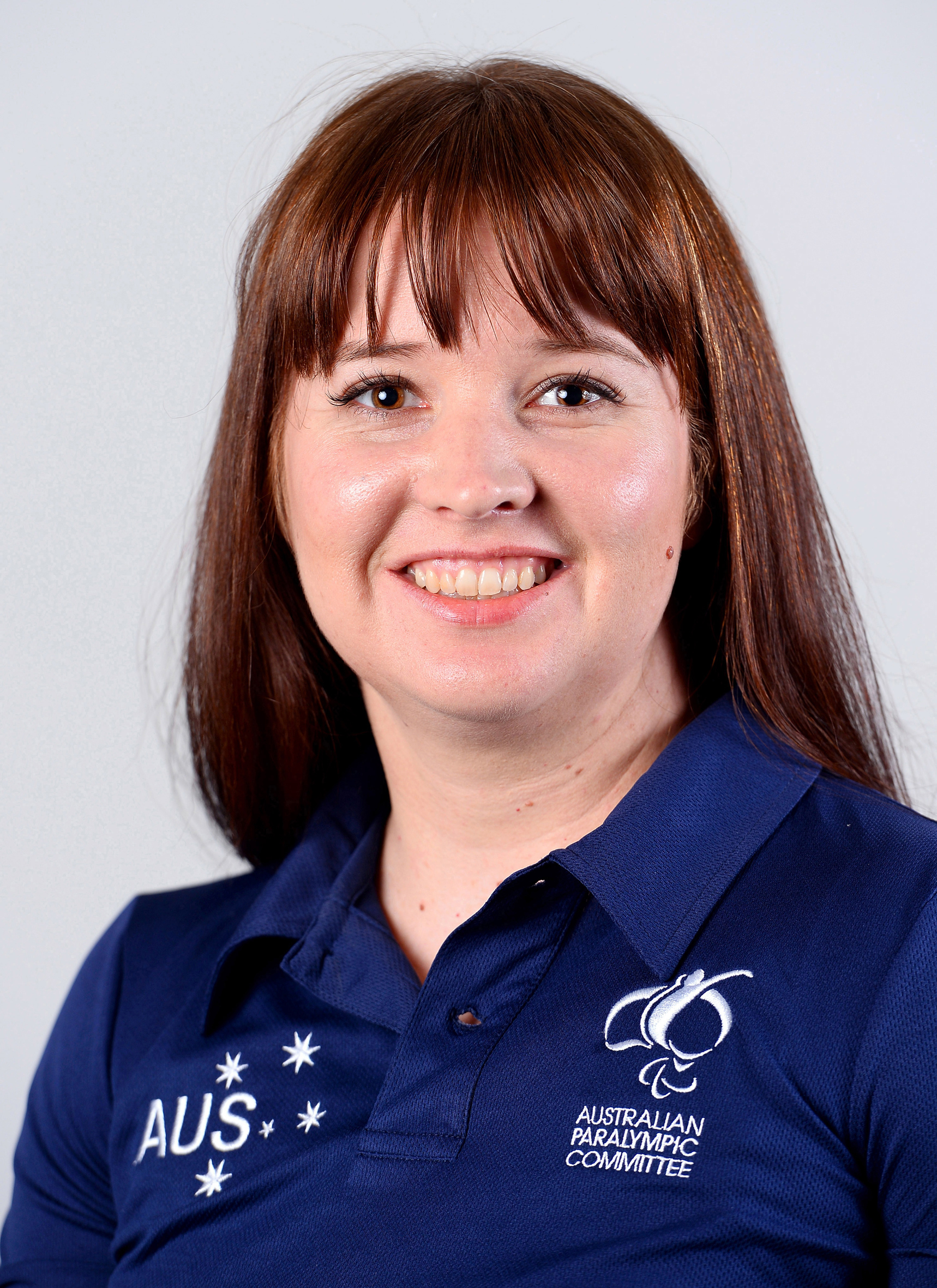
- 2016 Australian Paralympic team portrait of Ballard

Personal information
- Full name: Angela Ballard
- Nickname: Angie
- Nationality: Australian
- Born: 6 June 1982 (age 44) Canberra, Australian Capital Territory
- Height: 1.71 m (5 ft 7 in)
- Weight: 35–40 kg (5 st 7 lb – 6 st 4 lb)

Sport
- Sport: Paralympic athletics
- College team: The University of Sydney
- Club: ACTAS
Medal record
Track and field (athletics)
Paralympic Games
Silver medal – second place	2008 Beijing	4x100 m T53/54
Silver medal – second place	2012 London	200 m T53
Silver medal – second place	2012 London	400 m T53
Silver medal – second place	2016 Rio de Janeiro	4×400 m relay T53/54
Bronze medal – third place	2004 Athens	100 m T53
Bronze medal – third place	2012 London	100 m T53
Bronze medal – third place	2016 Rio de Janeiro	100 m T53
Bronze medal – third place	2016 Rio de Janeiro	400 m T53
IPC Athletics World Championships
Gold medal – first place	1998 Birmingham	4x100 m Relay
Gold medal – first place	1998 Birmingham	4x400 m Relay
Gold medal – first place	2002 Lille	100 m
Gold medal – first place	2015 Doha	200 m T53
Gold medal – first place	2015 Doha	400 m T53
Silver medal – second place	2013 Lyon	100 m T53
Silver medal – second place	2013 Lyon	200 m T53
Silver medal – second place	2013 Lyon	800 m T53
Silver medal – second place	2017 London	100m T53
Silver medal – second place	2017 London	200m T53
Bronze medal – third place	2013 Lyon	400 m T53
Bronze medal – third place	2015 Doha	800m T53
Commonwealth Games
Gold medal – first place	2014 Glasgow	1500 m T54
Silver medal – second place	2018 Gold Coast	1500 m T54
Silver medal – second place	2022 Birmingham	1500 m T53/54

Angela Ballard (born 6 June 1982) is an Australian Paralympic athlete who competes in T53 wheelchair sprint events. She became a paraplegic at age 7 due to a car accident.

She began competing in wheelchair racing in 1994, and first represented Australia in 1998. Over six Paralympic Games from 2000 to 2020, she has won four silver and four bronze medals. She has been coached by Louise Sauvage and trained with Madison de Rozario.

Ballard held athletics scholarships at the Australian Institute of Sport from 1999 to 2001, and The University of Sydney (while studying first commerce and then psychology), and also represents the ACT Academy of Sport. She has been appointed by a number of organisations as a disability or sports ambassador, and currently sits on the board of Wheelchair Sports NSW.

She competed at the 2024 Paris Paralympics – her seventh Games.

== Personal ==
At seven I was really angry and isolated. It was frightening. I wish I'd had someone to tell me it would get better, that life's not about the walking but about living your life.

— Angie Ballard, 2008

Ballard was born on 6 June 1982 in Canberra. At the age of seven, she became a (T10) paraplegic after a car accident, when her mother lost control of the car through fatigue. Following the accident, her initial hospitalisation and rehabilitation was in Canberra for three months, among elderly amputees. Her rehabilitation was then moved to the Royal North Shore Hospital, where she met Christie Dawes (née Skelton), who she would later race with in the Australian 4x100 m relay team at the 2008 Beijing Paralympics. She attended Lyneham Primary School and Lyneham High School in Canberra. Her physical education teacher was one of the people who first encouraged her to participate in wheelchair sports. After her rehabilitation she tried swimming and wheelchair basketball. Her first experiences of racing at the age of 12 resulted in blisters and a sore neck, but wheelchair athletics soon became her passion. At age 14, after treatment for scoliosis, Ballard was unable to participate in sport for a year.

She was offered a scholarship with the ACT Academy of Sport and she then took up an athletics scholarship at the Australian Institute of Sport in Canberra from 1999 to 2001. In 2002, she moved to Sydney to attend university on a sports scholarship, initially studying commerce. As of 2011, she was living in Liberty Grove, New South Wales and attending the University of Sydney studying for a Bachelor of Psychology, with the intention of practising as a psychologist. She graduated and received an Alumni Award in 2014.

== Athletics ==
People think because you end up in a chair that is it; but it is not. It's human nature, plain and simple, to better yourself; my sport has helped me get over the fact that I will never walk again. People all face and overcome different sorts of pitfalls in life. Sport has opened up a lot of opportunities for me; I meet a lot of different people, travel overseas a lot and have great things to look forward to.

— Angie Ballard, (2000)

Ballard is a wheelchair racing athlete, competing mainly in category T53 sprint events. Compared to T54 athletes, she has less use of her abdominal muscles, which means she cannot raise herself as much in her wheelchair to get the best angle to propel herself forward.

Ballard first entered competitive wheelchair races in 1994, at the age of twelve. Her first racing wheelchair was bought second hand. By 1997, she started taking the sport more seriously and began setting records in Australian athletics for her classification. A year later she was representing her country on the international stage. By 2000, she held national records in the T53 100 m and 200 m events.

From 2002 she held a sports scholarship at the University of Sydney, where she was coached by Andrew Dawes (Christie's husband). At the time, Dawes also coached Louise Sauvage, and on occasion the two would train together. After Sauvage retired from competitive wheelchair athletics following the 2004 Games, she became Ballard's coach.

In 2021, she is coached by Fred Periac.

=== Paralympics ===
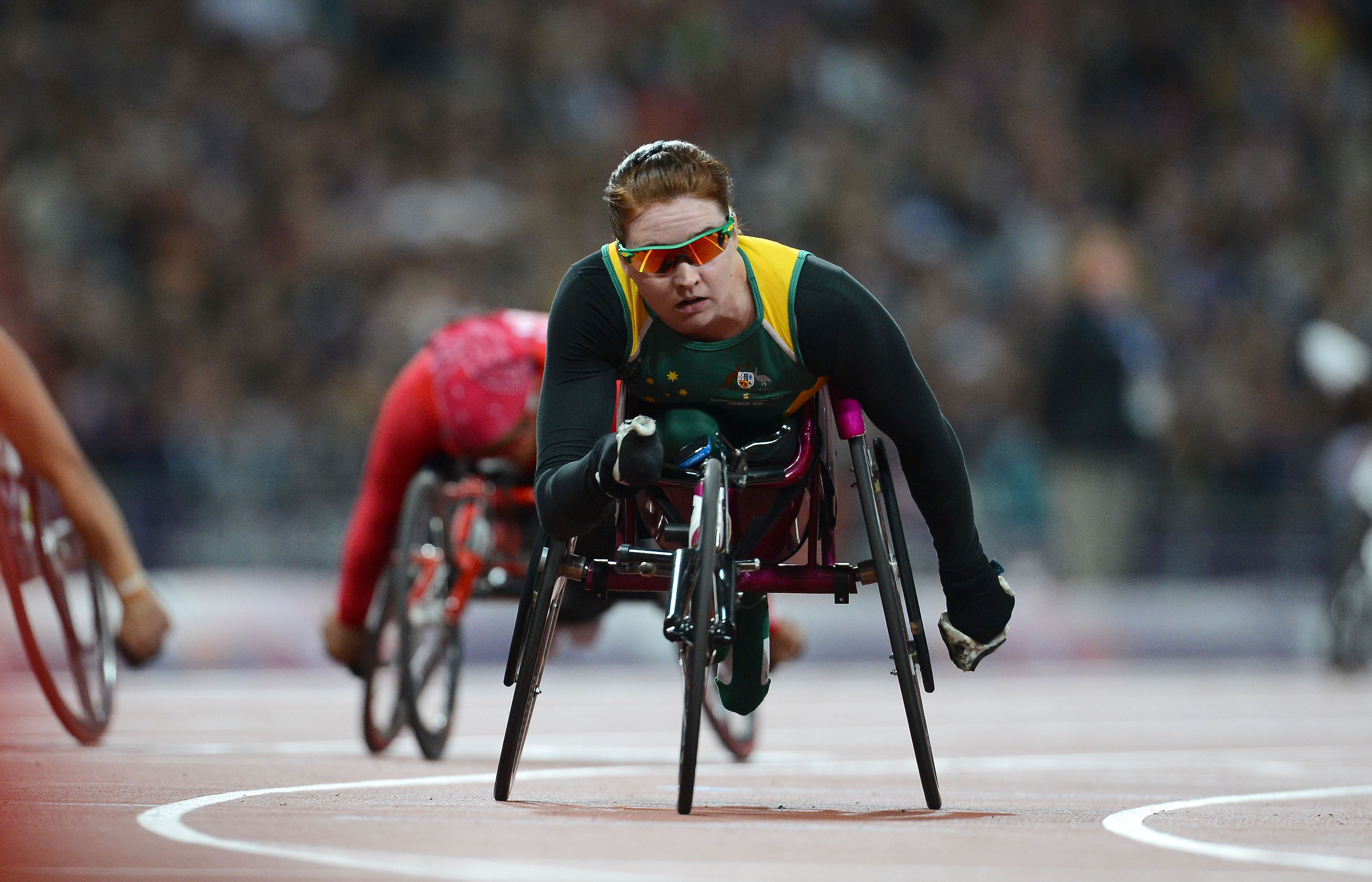
Ballard at the 2012 London Paralympics

Ballard competed in Sydney in the 2000 Summer Paralympics but did not win any medals, placing fourth in both the 100 m and 200 m events; she was also a torch bearer, and featured in the entertainment section of the opening ceremony, where she circled the track 12.3 metres (40 ft) in the air, suspended by a blimp and giant inflated angels. In preparation for the 2004 Athens Paralympics, Ballard trained six days a week in 11 sessions. Her training included going to Centennial Park and training on the hills there. It also included track work twice a week and doing weight training at least three times a week. This training schedule caused a few injuries, so she reduced the training frequency for later Games.

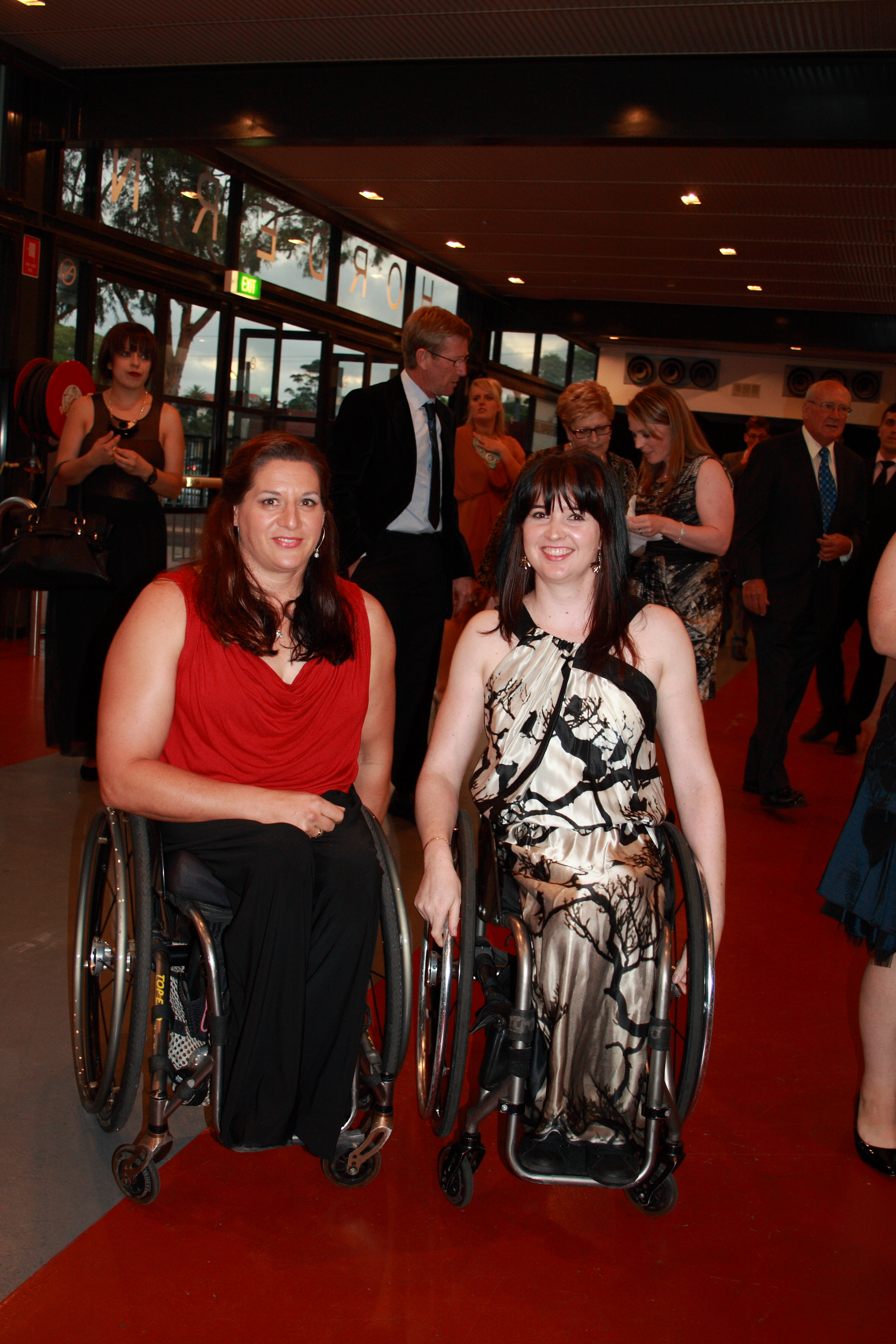
Louise Sauvage (left) and Ballard at the 2012 Australian Paralympian of the Year awards ceremony

Just before the Games, she competed in a warm up event in Switzerland, and set Australian records in the 100 m, 400 m and 800 m events. At the 2004 games, she won a bronze medal in the T53 100 m, behind Tanni Grey-Thompson and Francesca Porcellato. Her goal for the 2008 Beijing Paralympics was to set a personal best, but she also had eyes on a medal. She took the year off her psychology degree to train six times a week. At the 2008 games, along with her teammates Christie Dawes, Madison de Rozario, and Jemima Moore, she achieved her best Paralympic result, winning a silver medal behind China's world record in the T53/54 4x100 m relay. In the individual events, she finished fifth in the women's T53 100 m event (a race won in world record time by Huang Lisha), seventh in the women's T53 200 m event (also won in a world record time by Huang), seventh in the women's T53 400 m event, and led out the women's 800 m final, eventually finishing sixth. After a couple of sub-par competition results in 2011, Ballard made big changes to her diet, gloves, technique, chair position, and training regime. She entered the 2012 London Paralympics ranked world number one in both the T53 100 m and 200 m. At the games, Ballard participated in the T53 class events for 100 m, 200 m, 400 m and 800 m events. She won two silver medals in the 200 m and 400 m T53 events, and a bronze medal in the 100 m T53 event.

At the 2016 Rio Paralympics, she won bronze medals in the women's T53 100 m and 400 m.

At the 2020 Tokyo Paralympics, she was a finalist in the women's T53 100 m, 400 m, and 800 m. She came 7th in 100 m, 7th in 400 m and 7th in 800 m. At the 2024 Paris Paralympics, she finished sixth in the women's 400 m and 800 m T53 events.

=== World championships ===
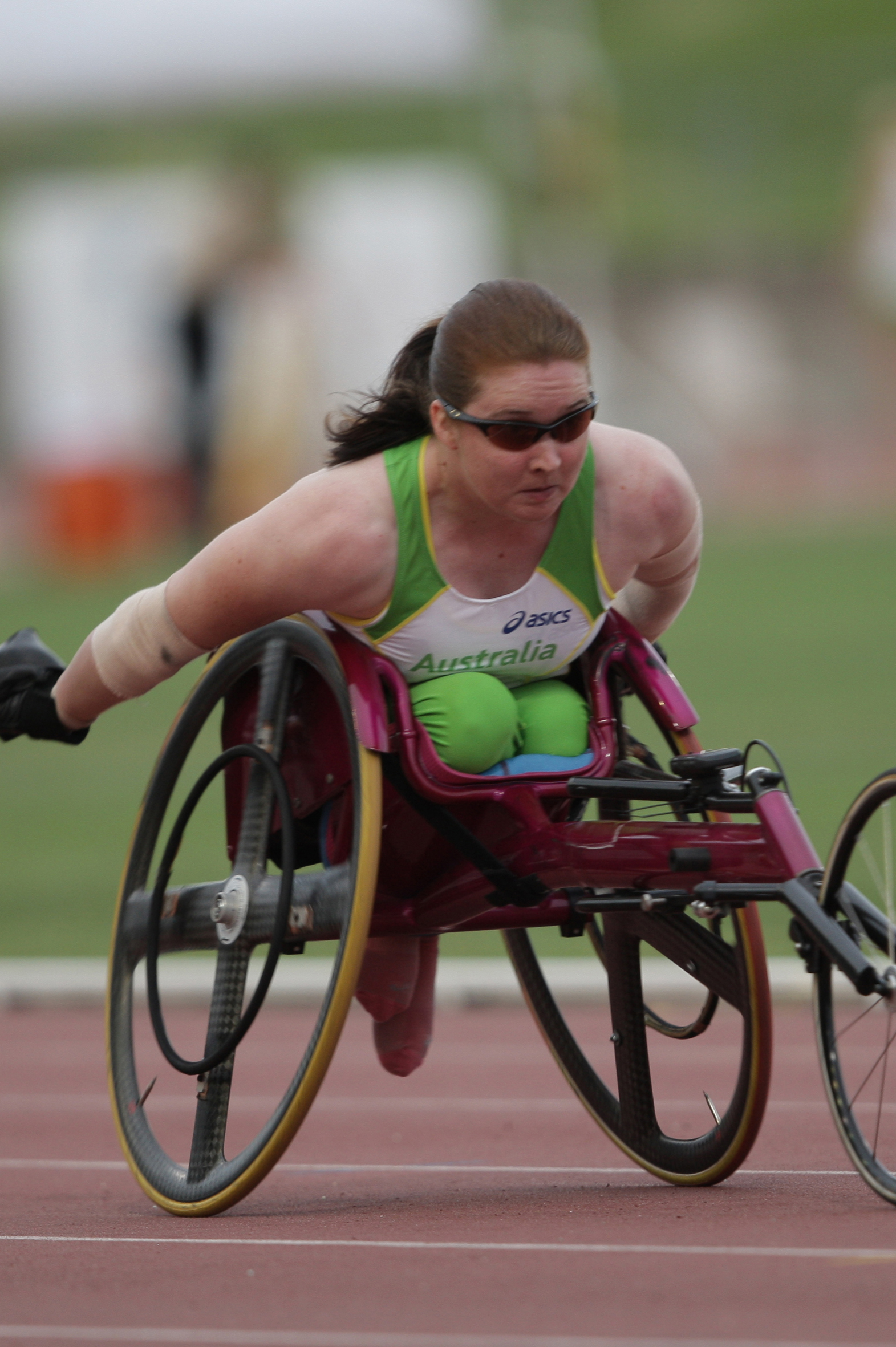
Angie Ballard competing at the 2011 World Championships warm-up meet in Sydney, January 2011

In August 1998, Ballard competed at the International Paralympic Committee World Championships in Birmingham, England, where she was part of the gold medal-winning Australian women's 4 x100 m and 4x400 m relay teams. Both relay wins set long-standing world records. In the 2002 World Championships, she won gold in the 100 m. At the 2013 IPC Athletics World Championships in Lyon, France, she won silver medals in the Women's 100 m, Women's 200 m and Women's 800 m T53 and a bronze medal in the 400 m T53.

At the 2015 IPC Athletics World Championships in Doha, Ballard won gold medals in the Women's 200m T53 in a championship record time of 29.33 and the Women's 400m T53. After winning the 400 m, Ballard said: "This is the one I wanted. I was so nervous coming in, you try and tell yourself that the worst thing that can happen is a loss and starting again tomorrow, but the reality is that this matters so much. I was so scared before the race, perhaps it gave me the adrenalin to get it done. I've just worked so hard for this for so long." She also won a bronze medal in the Women's 800 mm T54 behind gold medallist Madison de Rozario.

At the 2017 World Para Athletics Championships in London, England, she won the silver medals in the Women's 100 m and 200 m T53 events and finished fourth in the Women's 400 m T53 and sixth in the Women's 800 m T53 .

At the 2019 World Para Athletics Championships in Doha, she finished sixth in the Women's 100 m T53 and Women's 400 m T53 and eight in the Women's 800 m.

At the 2023 World Para Athletics Championships in Paris, she finished fourth in the Women's 800m T53 and sixth in the Women's 400m T53.

In the inaugural Paralympic World Cup in Manchester in 2005, Ballard placed third in the Women's T53 100 m.

=== Commonwealth Games ===
At the 2006 Commonwealth Games in Melbourne, she finished sixth in the Women's 800m T54. She won the gold medal in the Women's 1500m T54 at the 2014 Commonwealth Games in Glasgow. At the 2018 Commonwealth Games at the Gold Coast, Queensland, she won the silver medal in the Women's 1500m T54 finishing behind Madison de Rozario. She repeated her 2018 result, by winning the silver medal in Women's 1500m T54 at the 2022 Commonwealth Games, again behind de Rozario.de Rozario

=== Australian titles ===
Ballard won the 100 m women's wheelchair open title in 1998, 2001, 2002, 2004, 2005 and 2008, and finished second in 2000, 2003, 2010, and 2011. In the 200 m event, she won gold in 1998, 1999, 2001, 2002, 2004, 2008 and 2010, silver in 2000 and 2005 and bronze in 2006. In the 400 m, she won gold in 1999, 2000, 2001, 2005, 2008 and 2010, silver in 2004 and bronze in 2002 and 2006. In the 800 m, she won gold in 1999 and 2001, silver in 2000 and 2005, and bronze in 2002 and 2004. In the 1500 m, she won gold in 2005 and 2010.

In 1999, she competed at Australia's Junior Wheelchair Nationals. She won five gold medals at those games and was named the event's Female Athlete of the Games.

Ballard won a gold and silver at the 2011 Sydney Track Classic. At the 2012 competition, Ballard set personal bests and Oceania records for the 100 m (in a time of 17.27 s), 200 m (30.12 s) and 400 m (56.89 s) events.

=== Long distance events ===
Ballard also sometimes competes in longer distance events, in which the disability classifications are usually combined, so she competes against athletes in the higher T54 classification. She represented Australia in the 800 m (T54) at the 2006 Commonwealth Games, placing 6th in the final. At the 2014 Glasgow Commonwealth Games, she won a gold medal in the 1500 m T54. She has also raced in and helped organise the 10 km Oz Day wheelchair race, placing 2nd in 1999, 3rd in 2005, and 3rd in 2012. In 1998, together with Louise Sauvage, Christie Skelton, and Holly Ladmore, she completed an 845-kilometre (525 mi) relay from Byron Bay to Bondi Beach, which raised $200,000 for disabled athletes.

=== World records ===
- 29 May 2015 at the IPC Athletics Grand Prix in Nottwil, Switzerland – Women's 400m T53 world record with a time of 54.73 seconds.
- 4 June 2015 at IPC sanctioned Daniela Jutzeler Memorial Para-athletics Meet, Arbon, Switzerland – Women's 400m T53 world record with a time of 54.70
- 4 June 2015 at IPC sanctioned Daniela Jutzeler Memorial Para-athletics Meet, Arbon, Switzerland – Women's 800m T53 world record with a time of 1:47.48.
- 5 June 2016 at Indy Invitational Meet in Indianapolis, USA – Women's 400m T53 world record with a time of 54.69.

== Advocacy and patronage ==
Ballard has been appointed as an ambassador or advocate by a number of organisations with an interest in people with disabilities, sport, health, or exercise. In 2000, she was selected for Team MAA (Motor Accidents Authority), to discuss road trauma with other young people. In 2005, she was appointed as an ambassador for Technical Aid to the Disabled. She helped recruit volunteers, attended fundraisers, posed for photos and showed them her medal. Later that year she also visited patients at the Westmead Children's Hospital alongside a number of celebrities to help them celebrate Christmas. In 2007 Ballard was chosen as an ambassador for Walk to Work Day. She is on the board of the Wheelchair Sports Association of New South Wales.

Alongside a number of other university-affiliated athletes, Ballard attended a press conference to oppose the introduction of Voluntary Student Unionism.

== Recognition ==
- 1999 – ACT Academy of Sport Athlete of the year in the Disabled Category
- 2013 and 2014 – Athletics Australia Female Para-Athlete of the Year
- October 2014 – Awarded the Nigel C Barker Graduate Medal for Sporting Achievement by a recent graduate of the University of Sydney.
- 2024 – Co-captain with Curtis McGrath – Australian Team at the 2024 Paris Paralympics
- 2026 - Appointed as Paralympics Australia athlete representative on Brisbane Organising Committee for the 2032 Olympic and Paralympic Games Board.
