= Kootaberra, South Australia =

Kootaberra South Australia
- Coordinates: 32.0°S 137.5°E
- Postcode(s): 5713
- Location: 50 km (31 mi) north of Port Augusta
- LGA(s): Pastoral Unincorporated Area
- State electorate(s): Giles
- Federal division(s): Grey
Localities around Kootaberra:
Oakden Hills	South Gap	Yadlamalka
Yudnapinna	Kootaberra	Wilkatana Station
	Carriewerloo	Mount Arden

Kootaberra is a locality in the Far North region of South Australia. It spans the Stuart Highway about 50 kilometres (31 mi) north of Port Augusta. The boundaries were formalised on 26 April 2013, but the name had been used long before that for the Kootaberra Station pastoral run (sheep station).
