= Airswift =

Workforce recruiting company

- Formerly: Marchfield Engineering Resources, Air Energi, Swift Worldwide Resources.
- Type: Private
- Industry: Employment
- Founded: 1979
- Founder: Ian Langley
- Headquarters: Houston, Manchester, Singapore
- Key people: James Allen (CEO)
- Services: Talent Acquisition, Global Employment & Mobility, Swift Worldwide Resources
- Owner: Wellspring Capital Management, Reiten and Co
- Number of employees: 1,000
- Website: www.airswift.com

Airswift is an international workforce recruiting company operating in the technical and engineering sectors. Founded in 1979 by Ian Langley as Marchfield Engineering Resources and later renamed as Air Energi. After officially merging with Swift Worldwide Resources in January 2016, it became Airswift.

== History ==
Airswift was established in 1979 and originally called Marchfield Engineering Ltd. This was a company owned by Frank Sadler, who was a CAD Draftsman. Ian Langely, Frank’s nephew, joined the business in 1988 to set up the technical staffing business. Ian purchased the company from Frank in 1995 and changed the name of the business to Air Resources, which later became Air Energi. Swift Worldwide Resources was founded in 1981 by Pat Swift, who was a commissioning engineer in the North Sea. He wanted a reliable company to payroll his employees through, so he started his own.

In 2021, Airswift merged with another former competitor, Competentia, one of the largest in the world workforce solution provider, to support the mining and technology sectors.

Airswift was listed in the 2022 SIA report Largest Staffing Firms in the United States, a ranking of firms that generated at least $100 million in US staffing revenue in 2021.

Airswift authors the Global Energy Talent Index, an annual report on employment, skills and salary trends in the energy sector.

On 4 August 2023, Airswift signed a share purchase agreement with Worley regarding the acquisition of Energy Resourcing, which is a global recruitment and contractor management business. Energy Resourcing was the inhouse technical staffing arm of Worley globally, serving Worley as well as external clients.

== Operations ==
Airswift is headquartered in Houston, Manchester and Singapore, with operations in 70 countries worldwide. It provides services in talent acquisition (contract hire and professional search), global employment & mobility, managed solutions and consulting.
