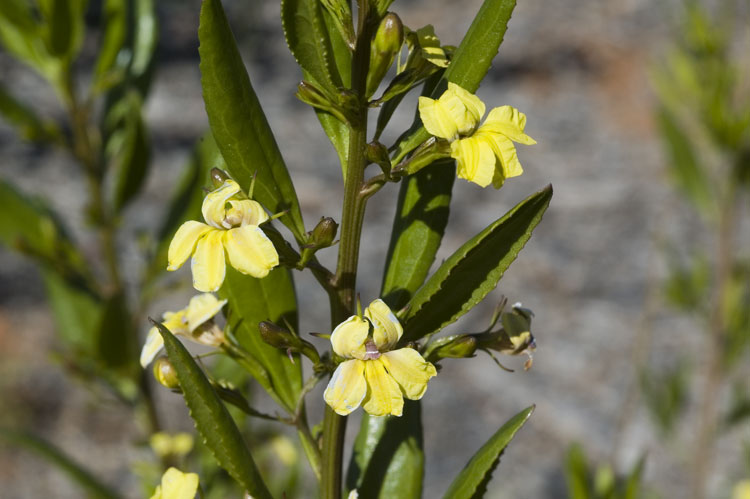
- In the Australian Arid Lands Botanic Garden

Scientific classification
- Kingdom: Plantae
- Clade: Tracheophytes
- Clade: Angiosperms
- Clade: Eudicots
- Clade: Asterids
- Order: Asterales
- Family: Goodeniaceae
- Genus: Goodenia
- Species: G. saccata

Binomial name
- Goodenia saccata Carolin

= Goodenia saccata =

Species of plant

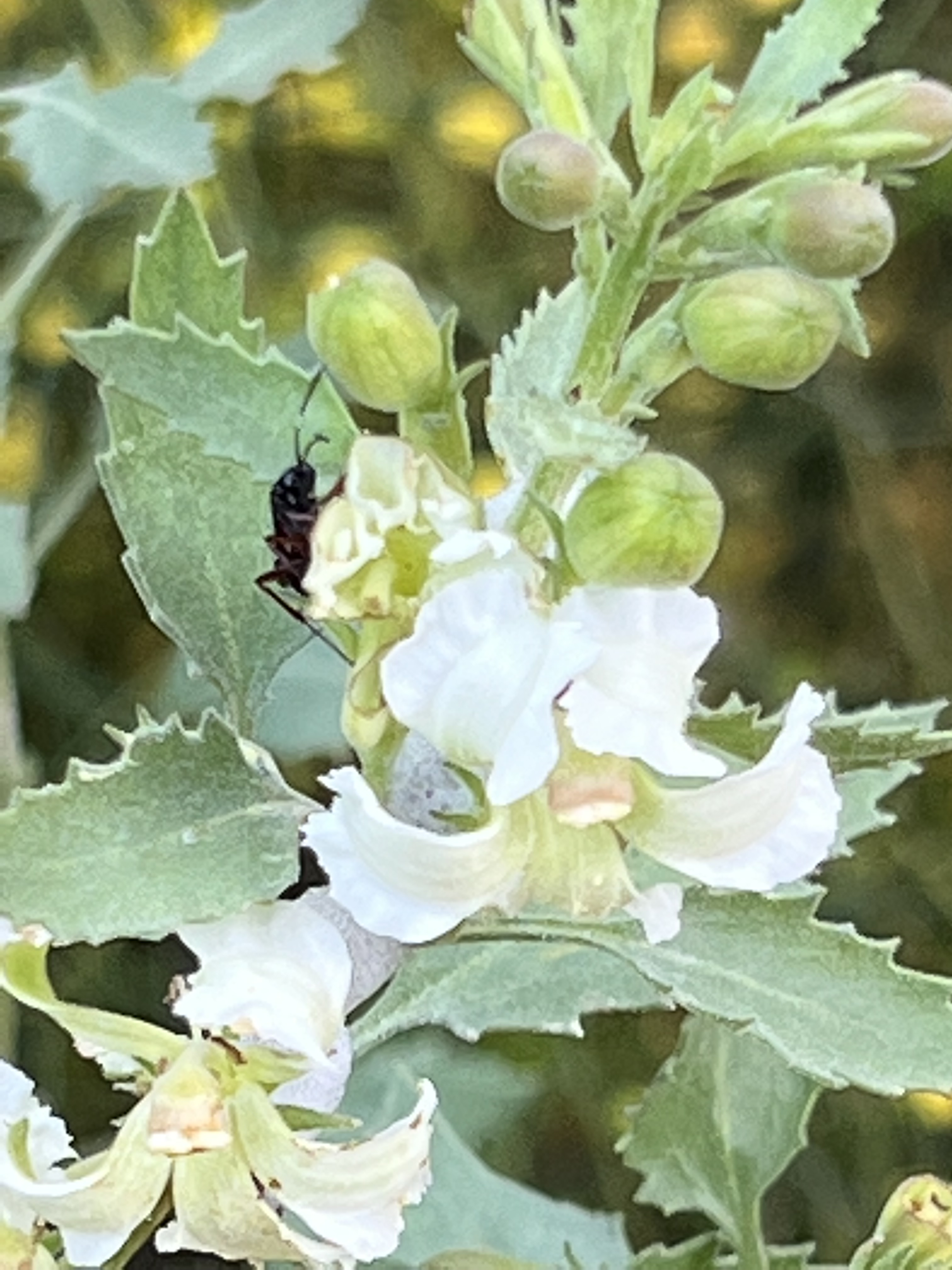
White form

Goodenia saccata is a species of flowering plant in the family Goodeniaceae and is endemic to South Australia. It is an erect shrub with toothed, egg-shaped, petiolate, hairy leaves and racemes or thyrses of yellow or off-white flowers.

== Description ==
Goodenia saccata is an erect shrub that typically grows to a height of up to 1 m (3 ft 3 in), the foliage densely hairy at first. The leaves are arranged along the stems and are egg-shaped, 20–50 mm (0.79–1.97 in) long and 20–30 mm (0.79–1.18 in) wide with toothed edges, on a petiole 15–50 mm (0.59–1.97 in) long. The flowers are arranged in racemes or thyrses up to 200 mm (7.9 in) long on peduncles less than 1 mm (0.039 in) long with leaf-like bracts and linear bracteoles about 1.5 mm (0.059 in) long. Each flower is on a pedicel 4–6 mm (0.16–0.24 in) long. The sepals are lance-shaped, 5–6 mm (0.20–0.24 in) long, the petals yellow or off-white and 14–17 mm (0.55–0.67 in) long with a prominent pouch. The lower lobes of the corolla are about 8 mm (0.31 in) long with wings about 2 mm (0.079 in) wide. Flowering mainly occurs from September to November and the fruit is an oval capsule about 10 mm (0.39 in) long.

== Taxonomy and naming ==
Goodenia saccata was first formally described in 1980 by Roger Charles Carolin in the fourth edition of the Flora of South Australia from material collected by August Wilhelm Eichler in the Gammon Ranges in 1956. The specific epithet (saccata) is a Latin word meaning "pouched".

== Distribution and habitat ==
This goodenia grows on stony slopes and in creek beds in the northern Flinders Ranges and ranges of the Lake Torrens basin.
