= Mount Arden (disambiguation) =

Mount Arden is a locality in the Australian state of South Australia.

Mount Arden may also refer to the following:

- Mount Arden, a peak in the Flinder Ranges in South Australia
- Mount Arden, a peak on Black Mountain in Henderson, Nevada
- Mount Arden, a pastoral lease of William Ranson Mortlock in South Australia

== See also ==
- Arden Mounts, NASCAR driver
