= Applecart =

Applecart or Apple Cart may refer to:

- The Apple Cart, a 1928 play by George Bernard Shaw
- Applecart (company), a data-analytics firm
- Applecart, a 2017 film by Don Coscarelli

== See also ==
- "Do not upset the apple-cart", in the List of proverbial phrases
