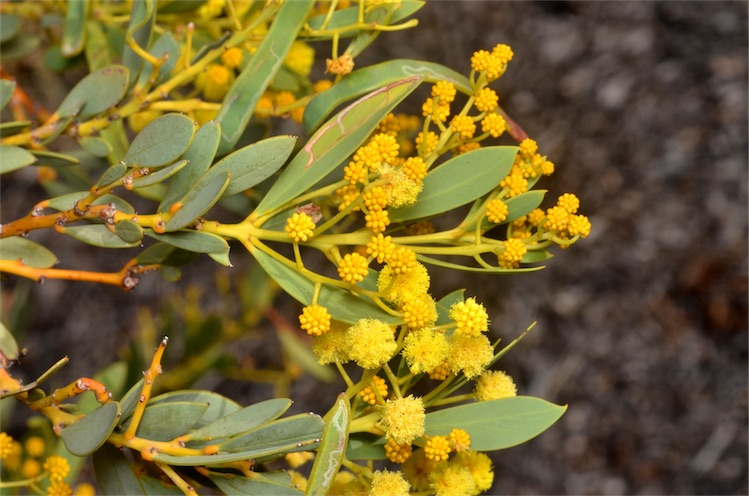
- In the Australian Arid Lands Botanic Garden

Scientific classification
- Kingdom: Plantae
- Clade: Embryophytes
- Clade: Tracheophytes
- Clade: Spermatophytes
- Clade: Angiosperms
- Clade: Eudicots
- Clade: Rosids
- Order: Fabales
- Family: Fabaceae
- Subfamily: Caesalpinioideae
- Clade: Mimosoid clade
- Genus: Acacia
- Species: A. spooneri

Binomial name
- Acacia spooneri O'Leary
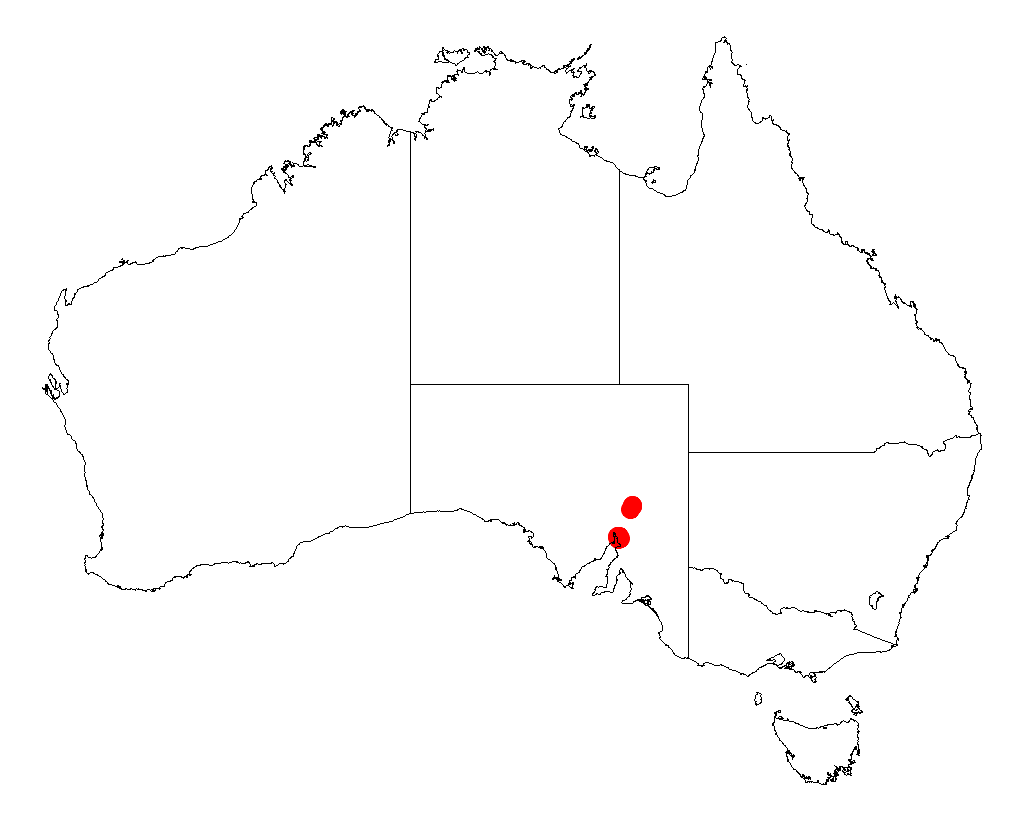
- Occurrence data from AVH

= Acacia spooneri =

Species of legume

Acacia spooneri is a shrub of the genus Acacia and the subgenus Phyllodineae. It is native to a small area in South Australia

== Description ==
The spindly and slender shrub or tree can grow to a height of 4 m (13 ft) and often has an open habit and a single stem. It has glabrous and reddish brown branchlets. Like most species of Acacia it has phyllodes rather than true leaves. The pale green to grey-green glabrous phyllodes have a narrowly elliptic to obovate or oblanceolate shape. The coriaceous to thinly coriaceous phyllodes have a length of 2.2 to 10.2 cm (0.87 to 4.02 in) and a width of 6 to 26 mm (0.24 to 1.02 in) with a prominent central midrib and clearly visible lateral nerves. It blooms throughout the year most prolifically between May and August.

== Taxonomy ==
A. spooneri was first described by M.C. O'Leary in 2002.

== Distribution ==
It has a disjunct distribution and is known in two areas that are situated approximately 150 km (93 mi) apart in the Flinders Range in South Australia. It is found around Brachina Gorge and Wilpena Pound in the north and around Nectar Brook on the Winninowie Range in the south. It is often situated on rocky ridgetops as a part of mallee communities over spinifex grassland or in Callitris pine communities.

== See also ==
- List of Acacia species
