= Great Western Bridge =

Great Western Bridge may refer to:

- Kelvinbridge in Glasgow, Scotland
- the 1927 bridge replaced in the 1970s by the Joy Baluch AM Bridge across the head of Spencer Gulf in South Australia
