= Joy Baluch AM Bridge =

- Coordinates: 32°29′10″S 137°45′44″E
- Carries: Augusta Highway
- Crosses: Spencer Gulf
- Locale: Port Augusta, South Australia
- Named for: Joy Baluch
- Owner: Department for Infrastructure & Transport
- Preceded by: Yorkey Crossing

Characteristics
- No. of lanes: 4

History
- Opened: 1972
- Replaces: Great Western Bridge

The Joy Baluch AM Bridge is a bridge across Spencer Gulf between Port Augusta and Port Augusta West in South Australia. It carries the Augusta Highway and is a key road link on both east–west and north–south road routes in Australia. The western end leads to Eyre Peninsula, the Eyre Highway (to Western Australia) and the Stuart Highway (to the Northern Territory). The eastern end leads heads towards Adelaide, Victoria and New South Wales.

The bridge was opened in 1972. In 2012 it was named after Joy Baluch who had been mayor of Port Augusta for forty years.

== Great Western Bridge ==
The current bridge replaced an earlier bridge known as the Great Western Bridge which had been built in 1927. It was rebuilt and widened in 1944. The older bridge is still visible north of the current crossing. Until 2017 it had continued to be used as a pedestrian and cycling bridge, and for recreational fishing. An engineering report identified that the structure of the 90-year-old timber bridge was failing and needed significant investment to remain safe for public access, so the bridge was closed. When access to the old bridge was closed, the speed limit on the main bridge was initially reduced to 25 km/h to provide safety for the increased cyclist and pedestrian traffic. This was then raised to 40 km/h. Demolition commenced in March 2024.

== Bridge duplication ==
In 2023, the bridge was duplicated by adding a second two-lane bridge immediately north of the original bridge. This was funded by $160 million by the Federal Government and $40 million by the Government of South Australia. Both bridges have two-way shared pedestrian/cycling paths separated from the road traffic.

The contract for detailed design and construction was let in March 2020 to the Port Wakefield to Port Augusta Alliance, a consortium of CPB Contractors, Aurecon and GHD Group. This consortium was also responsible for the overpass and duplication on Port Wakefield Road near Port Wakefield. The new bridge was completed in June 2023.
