= Davenport, South Australia =

Davenport
- Suburb
- Coordinates: 32°28′19″S 137°47′20″E
- Country: Australia
- State: South Australia
- Region: Far North
- City: Port Augusta
- LGA: City of Port Augusta
- Location: 282 km (175 mi) N of Adelaide; 4 km (2.5 mi) NE of Port Augusta
- Established: 8 July 2014

Government
  - State electorate: Stuart
  - Federal division: Grey
- Elevation: 10 m (33 ft)

Population
  - Total: 156 (SAL 2021)
- Time zone: UTC+9:30 (ACST)
  - Summer (DST): UTC+10:30 (ACST)
- Postcode: 5700
- County: Frome
- Mean max temp: 26.4 °C (79.5 °F)
- Mean min temp: 12.1 °C (53.8 °F)
- Annual rainfall: 215.0 mm (8.46 in)
Suburbs around Davenport
Wami Kata
Davenport
Port Augusta

Davenport is a suburb in the Australian state of South Australia located about 282 kilometres (175 mi) north of the state capital of Adelaide and about 4 kilometres (2.5 mi) north-east of the municipal seat in Port Augusta.

The suburb was created on 8 July 2014 on land excluded from the existing suburbs of Port Augusta and Wami Kata. This followed a request from the Davenport Community Council, the organisation representing the aboriginal community residing there. It is located within the cadastral unit of the Hundred of Davenport. The names of private roads and the numbering of property within the suburb were approved by the council meeting of the City of Port Augusta held on 27 October 2014.

Land in both the suburb and the adjoining suburb of Wami Kuta was associated with the Umeewarra Mission which was operated by the Open Brethren Assemblies of South Australia from 1937 to 1964 and whose main elements were a school and a home for children. In 1964, the mission came under the control of the South Australian government. At the same time, the area was renamed as the Davenport Reserve. In 1968, the administration of the reserve was transferred to the Davenport Community Council. The children’s home closed in 1995 when its superintendent retired.

Land use within Davenport is residential, however planning regulations do permit the establishment of facilities for recreation, "small scale light industry" and community use which are consistent with the historical character of the community living within the suburb. Davenport includes the Wami Kata Old Folks Home, an aged care facility, and the former Umeewarra Mission building which as of 2014 was scheduled for demolition despite calls for its retention by former occupants.

The 2016 Australian census which was conducted in August 2016 reports that Davenport and an adjoining part of the suburb of Port Augusta shared a population of 163 people of whom 98.1% identify as being "Aboriginal and/or Torres Strait Islander people."

Davenport is located within the federal division of Grey, the state electoral district of Stuart and the local government area of the City of Port Augusta.
