= Emeroo, South Australia =

Emeroo South Australia
- Coordinates: 32°20′38″S 137°51′55″E
- Population: no data available (2016 census)
- Established: 2013
- Postcode(s): 5713
- Time zone: ACST (UTC+9:30)
  - Summer (DST): ACST (UTC+10:30)
- Location: 295 km (183 mi) north of Adelaide; 18 km (11 mi) north-west of Port Augusta
- LGA(s): Pastoral Unincorporated Area
- Region: Far North
- County: Newcastle
- State electorate(s): Giles
- Federal division(s): Grey
Mean max temp	Mean min temp	Annual rainfall
26.3 °C; 79 °F	12.1 °C; 54 °F	214.1 mm 8.4 in
Suburbs around Emeroo:
Mount Arden	Mount Arden; Yarrah	Yarrah
Mount Arden; Carriewerloo	Emeroo	Quorn
Port Augusta West	Wami Kata; Mundallio; Saltia	Quorn
- Footnotes: Location; Adjoining localities

Emeroo is a locality in the Australian state of South Australia about 295 kilometres (183 miles) north of the state capital of Adelaide and about 18 kilometres (11 miles) northeast of Port Augusta in the state’s Far North region.

Emeroo is the site of a township that never developed.

As of 2012, the majority land use in the area was pastoral farming, while the land in the east of the area, which is associated with the western slope of the Flinders Ranges, includes The Dutchmans Stern Conservation Park and it is zoned for conservation.

The gazetted locality of Emeroo was created in April 2013, including portions removed from the adjoining localities of Quorn and Wami Kata; the name was derived from the undeveloped township. Its western and southern boundaries approximately align with those of the cadastral unit of the County of Newcastle. The locality extends in the west from a watercourse that extends from north and drains into Spencer Gulf to the western slopes of the Flinders Ranges in the east. The locality surrounds the top of Spencer Gulf including the ford known as Yorkey Crossing. The locality’s eastern side includes the western half of The Dutchmans Stern Conservation Park.

The Marree railway line passes through the area from south to north, while the track for both the Adelaide–Darwin railway and the Trans-Australian Railway passes through the locality's south-west.

The former Emeroo Station Ostrich Farm is listed on the South Australian Heritage Register, reflecting its historical significance.

Emeroo lies within the federal division of Grey, the state electoral district of Giles and the Pastoral Unincorporated Area of South Australia.
