= Joy Baluch =

Australian politician

Mayor of Port Augusta
- In office 1981 – 1982
- Preceded by: William Irvin Charles Howard
- Succeeded by: Kenneth Charles Naisbitt
- In office 1983 – 1993
- Preceded by: Kenneth Charles Naisbitt
- Succeeded by: R. Robertson
- In office 1995 – 14 May 2013
- Preceded by: R. Robertson
- Succeeded by: Sam Johnson

Personal details
- Born: Nancy Joy Copley; 10 October 1932
- Died: 14 May 2013 (aged 80)
- Party: Liberal
- Spouse: Teofil Stefan Baluch (m. 1954; died 1997)
- Awards: Centenary Medal (2001); Member of the Order of Australia (2007)

Nancy Joy Baluch AM (10 October 1932 – 14 May 2013) was an Australian politician who served as Mayor of Port Augusta from 1981 to 1993 and from 1995 until her death. Her term as mayor of 29 years is believed to be an Australian record.

Baluch was born in Port Augusta to George Budgen Copley and Jessie Stuart Copley, née Parker. She attended Cook and Port Augusta Primary Schools and Port Augusta High School. She married Teofil Stefan Baluch, a Ukrainian who had been imprisoned in Dachau concentration camp in World War II, in 1954. She worked as head stenographer for the Mechanical Engineering Branch of Commonwealth Railways between 1949 and 1953, and was owner/proprietor of a motel from 1961 to 1981. She was elected to Port Augusta City Council in 1970.

Baluch became involved in local politics after her son, a severe asthmatic, was born and she became a campaigner for improved health services. After becoming mayor in 1981, she led the successful effort to ban drinking in public places in Port Augusta. She also came to public notice when she imposed a night-time curfew on the citizens of the town in order to reduce violence. She stood as the Liberal candidate for Grey at the 1983 Australian federal election.

Her husband died 16 years before she did, of lung cancer. As he did not smoke, it was attributed to the power stations where he worked. Baluch campaigned for solar-thermal technology to replace coal-fired power.

She died, still the serving mayor, on 14 May 2013, after a long period with breast cancer.

== Honours ==
Joy Baluch was awarded the Centenary Medal in 2001.

She was appointed a Member of the Order of Australia in 2007 "for service to local government in South Australia, particularly through contributions to economic and regional development, and to the community of Port Augusta and region".

The Joy Baluch AM Bridge over the Spencer Gulf is named in her honour.

Baluch starred in a documentary by Dick Smith called Ten Bucks a Litre, released on 1 August 2013, which included a dedication towards her at the end.

Civic offices
Preceded by W. I. C. Howard	Mayor of Port Augusta; 1981–1982	Succeeded by K. Naisbitt
Preceded by K. Naisbitt	Mayor of Port Augusta; 1983–1993	Succeeded by R. Robertson
Preceded by R. Robertson	Mayor of Port Augusta; 1995–2013	Succeeded by Sam Johnson
