= Athletics at the 2004 Summer Paralympics – Women's 100 metres T53–54 =

Women's 100m races for wheelchair athletes at the 2004 Summer Paralympics were held in the Athens Olympic Stadium. Events were held in two disability classes.

== T53 ==
Women's 100m T53 at the XII Paralympic Games
- Venue: Athens Olympic Stadium
- Dates: 23 September 2004
- Competitors: 6 from 4 nations
- Winning time: 17.24

Medalists
| 1st place, gold medalist(s) | | Tanni Grey-Thompson OBE | Great Britain |
| 2nd place, silver medalist(s) | | Francesca Porcellato | Italy |
| 3rd place, bronze medalist(s) | | Angela Ballard | Australia |

The T53 event consisted of a single race. It was won by Tanni Grey-Thompson OBE, representing Great Britain.

=== Final Round ===
23 Sept. 2004, 21:20

| Rank | Athlete | Time | Notes |
|---|---|---|---|
| 1st place, gold medalist(s) | Tanni Grey-Thompson OBE (GBR) | 17.24 | |
| 2nd place, silver medalist(s) | Francesca Porcellato (ITA) | 17.63 | |
| 3rd place, bronze medalist(s) | Angela Ballard (AUS) | 17.87 | |
| 4 | Miriam Nibley (USA) | 18.02 | |
| 5 | Jessica Galli (USA) | 18.66 | |
| 6 | Shirley Reilly (USA) | 18.81 | |

== T54 ==
Women's 100m T54 at the XII Paralympic Games
- Venue: Athens Olympic Stadium
- Dates: 20–21 September 2004
- Competitors: 11 from 10 nations
- Winning time: 16.33

Medalists
| 1st place, gold medalist(s) | | Chantal Petitclerc | Canada |
| 2nd place, silver medalist(s) | | Tatyana McFadden | United States |
| 3rd place, bronze medalist(s) | | Manuela Schaer | Switzerland |

The T54 event consisted of 2 heats and a final. It was won by Chantal Petitclerc, representing Canada.

=== 1st Round ===
| Qualified for next round |

Heat 1

20 Sept. 2004, 10:25

| Rank | Athlete | Time | Notes |
|---|---|---|---|
| 1 | Tatyana McFadden (USA) | 16.71 | Q |
| 2 | Chen Yu Lien (TPE) | 17.28 | Q |
| 3 | Yvonne Sehmisch (GER) | 17.37 | Q |
| 4 | Messaouda Sifi (TUN) | 18.07 | q |
| 5 | Alva Yovadina Puac (GUA) | 19.74 | |

Heat 2

20 Sept. 2004, 10:31

| Rank | Athlete | Time | Notes |
|---|---|---|---|
| 1 | Chantal Petitclerc (CAN) | 16.45 | WR Q |
| 2 | Manuela Schaer (SUI) | 16.72 | Q |
| 3 | Wen Qing (CHN) | 17.41 | Q |
| 4 | Jennifer Goeckel (USA) | 18.21 | q |
| 5 | Yazmith Bataz (MEX) | 18.78 | |
| 6 | Mada Sow (SEN) | 19.94 | |

=== Final Round ===
21 Sept. 2004, 17:30

| Rank | Athlete | Time | Notes |
|---|---|---|---|
| 1st place, gold medalist(s) | Chantal Petitclerc (CAN) | 16.33 | WR |
| 2nd place, silver medalist(s) | Tatyana McFadden (USA) | 16.69 | |
| 3rd place, bronze medalist(s) | Manuela Schaer (SUI) | 16.93 | |
| 4 | Yvonne Sehmisch (GER) | 17.35 | |
| 5 | Chen Yu Lien (TPE) | 17.41 | |
| 6 | Wen Qing (CHN) | 17.52 | |
| 7 | Jennifer Goeckel (USA) | 18.02 | |
| 8 | Messaouda Sifi (TUN) | 18.21 | |
