= Cindy Hook =

American businesswoman (born 1964)

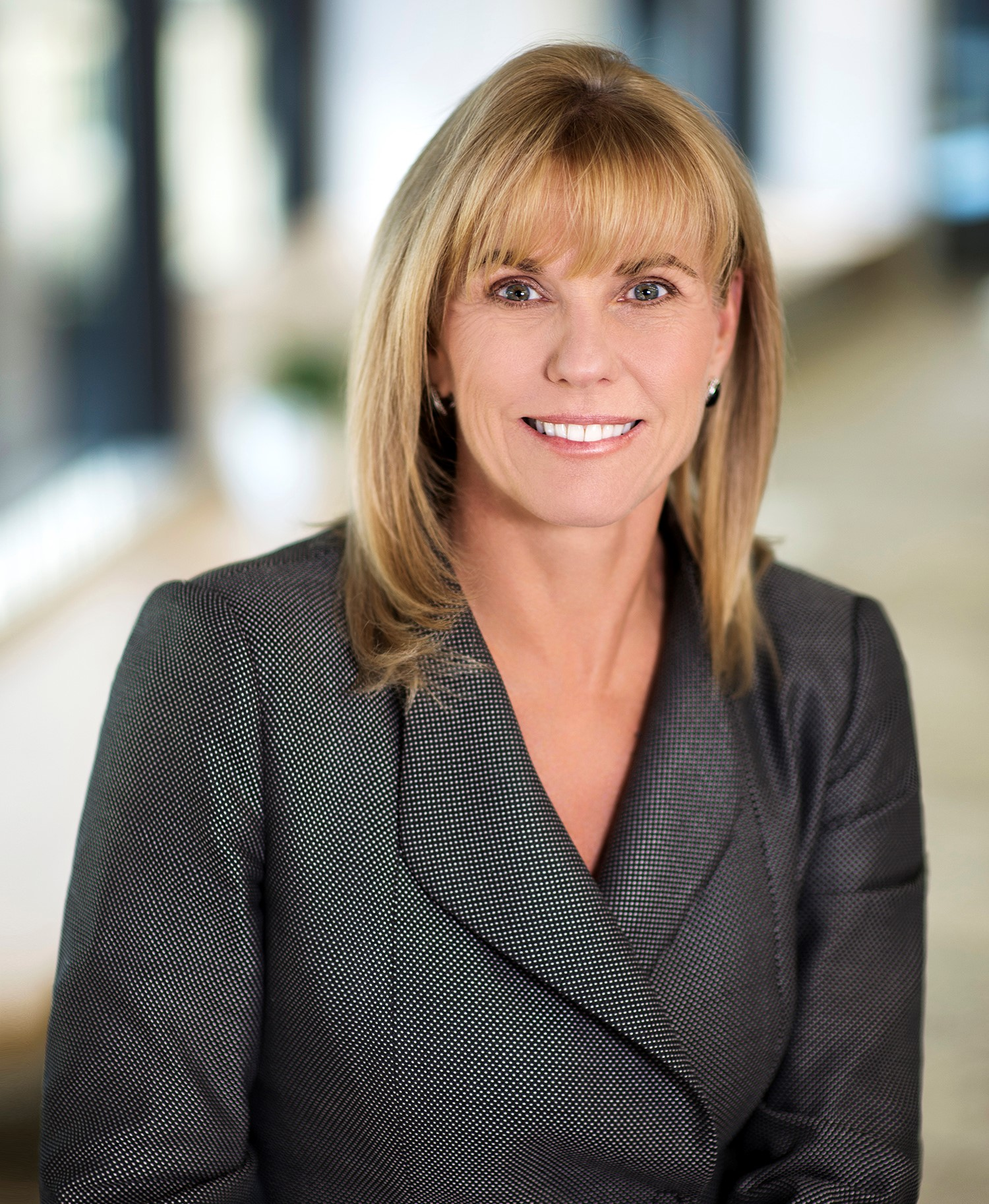
- Born: Vicksburg, Mississippi, U.S.
- Education: Miami University
- Employer: Deloitte
- Board member of: Great Barrier Reef Foundation

Cindy Hook is an American-Australian business executive. She was the chief executive officer of Deloitte Asia Pacific from 2018 to 2022, and CEO for Deloitte Australia from 2015 to 2018, making her the first female CEO of an Australian big four professional services firm, and championed diversity and inclusion while in that role. She is the chief executive of the organising committee for the 2032 Summer Olympic and Paralympic Games.

== Early life and education ==
Hook was born in Vicksburg, Mississippi, U.S. and grew up in California.

She obtained a Bachelor of Science in Business Administration from Miami University.

== Career ==
After graduating, Hook began her career at Deloitte in San Francisco. She joined the firm as an auditor in 1986 and was made a partner in 1998.

In 2009, Hook moved to Australia and soon afterwards was appointed the managing partner for Deloitte Australia's Assurance and Advisory practice. In 2013, under Hook's leadership, the Deloitte Australia Assurance and Advisory practice won both Accounting Firm of the Year and Audit Firm of the Year in the Australian Financial Review CFO awards – the first time a firm had taken out both awards in the same year.

In February 2015, she was appointed chief executive officer for Deloitte Australia, succeeding the previous CEO Giam Swiegers. With the appointment, she became the first female CEO of an Australian Big Four professional services firm. During her tenure as Deloitte Australia CEO, she led the firm to four consecutive record years of 15% annual revenue growth.

In September 2018, Hook was elected as the first Deloitte Asia Pacific CEO for a term of four years. In this role Hook oversaw 65,000 professionals and the firm's operations in Australia, China, Japan, Korea, Southeast Asia, and New Zealand. In October 2021, she announced that she would not run for a second term in the Singapore-based CEO's role when her current term ended May 2022. She stated in an email to other partners that the decision was made for personal and professional reasons.

On December 13, 2022, Hook was appointed as chief executive of the organising committee for the 2032 Summer Olympic and Paralympic Games set to take place in Brisbane, Queensland, Australia. In October 2026, Hook announced that she would leave the role at the end of her four-year contract, and the committee said it would begin a search for her successor.

== Activism ==
Hook is an advocate for diversity, inclusion, and well-being. During her time as Deloitte Australia CEO, Hook introduced a Return to Work program to support people who had taken career breaks to transition back to work. She also introduced paid parental leave for fathers, and took major steps to enable the advancement of women and ensure pay equality.

She also championed the LGBTI community through initiatives such as the Outstanding 50 LGBTI leaders list.

== Other roles ==
Hook is (as of 2018) a member of the board of directors for the Great Barrier Reef Foundation, a special advisor to the Male Champions of Change and a member of Chief Executive Women.

== Recognition ==
In 2016 Hook was named an Australian Financial Review 100 Women of Influence Awards finalist.

In 2017, she was named Pride in Diversity CEO of the Year for her efforts in creating an inclusive atmosphere at Deloitte and championing the LGBTI community.

In 2018, Hook was named in The Australian Financial Review's annual "Power" issue as one of the top five most powerful people in consulting.

== Personal life ==
Hook is an avid fan of Bruce Springsteen and enjoys travel and the outdoors.
