= Yorkey Crossing =

Yorkeys Crossing Emeroo, South Australia
- Coordinates: 32°24′11″S 137°45′10″E
- Location: 7.4 km (5 mi) north of Port Augusta
- LGA(s): ‘Out of Councils’

Yorkey Crossing or Yorkeys Crossing is a ford in the Australian state of South Australia located at the head of Spencer Gulf in the gazetted locality of Emeroo about 4 nautical miles (7.4 km; 4.6 mi) north of Port Augusta. As of 2014, it is the site of an unsealed road that serves as a by-pass route around the head of the gulf for 'over dimensional vehicles' (i.e. greater than 4 m (13 ft) wide and 5.8 m (19 ft) high), which are not permitted to cross the gulf using the Joy Baluch AM Bridge. It is also near the location of the crossing (also known as Yorkey Crossing) for the Kalgoorlie to Port Augusta Railway (now called the Trans-Australian Railway) built after 1911. It is considered to be the most north easterly part of Eyre Peninsula and is popular with railway enthusiasts.

It is commonly known by the possessive 'Yorkey's Crossing', such as when mentioned in episode 3 of the 2020 ABC television drama Stateless.
