= Port Augusta West, South Australia =

Port Augusta West Port Augusta, South Australia
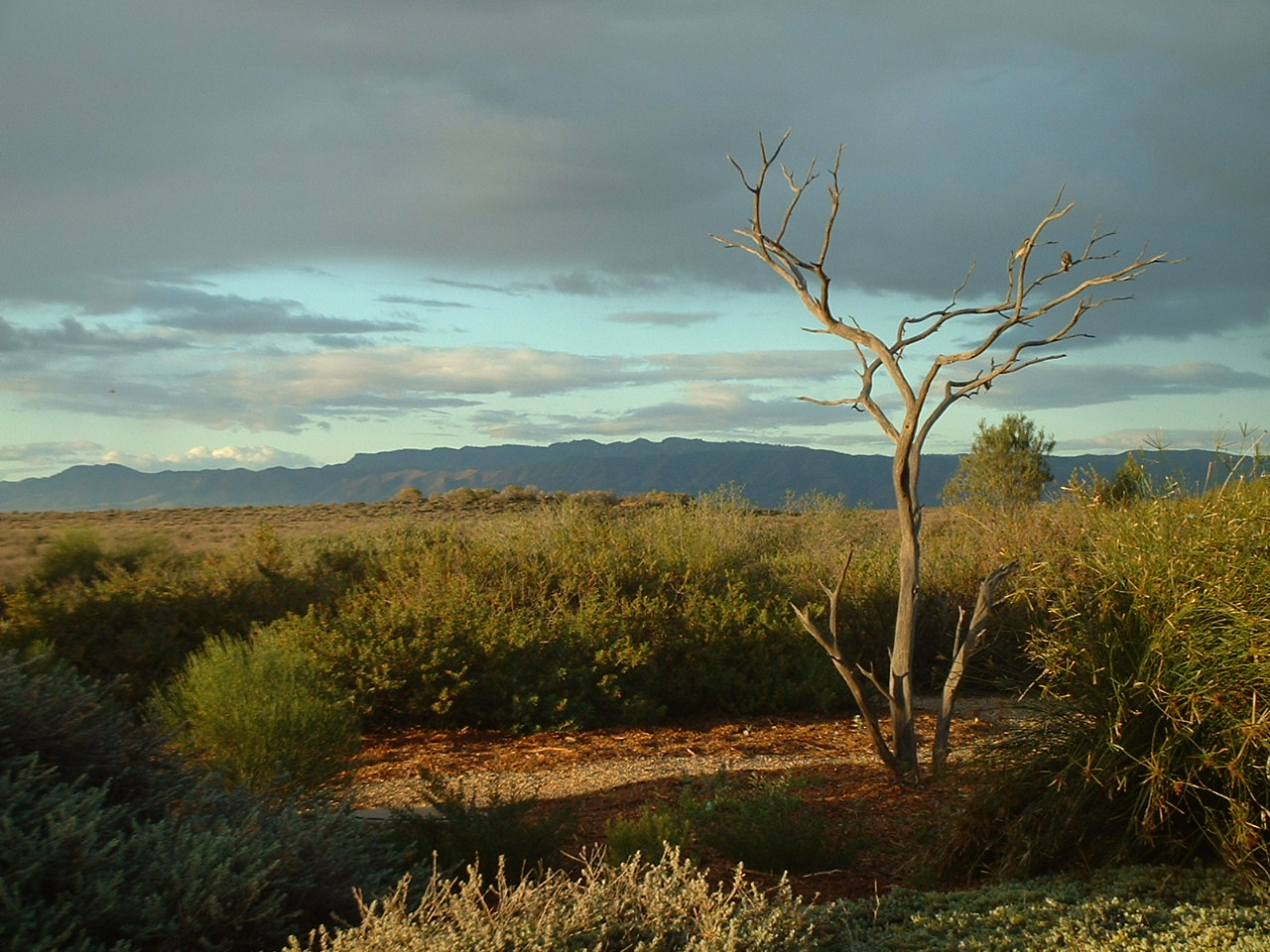
- Australian Arid Lands Botanic Garden

- Coordinates: 32.4842°S 137.7589°E
- Population: 4,046 (SAL 2021)
- Established: 1865
- Postcode(s): 5700
- Elevation: 14 m (46 ft)
- Time zone: ACST (UTC+9:30)
  - Summer (DST): ACST (UTC+10:30)
- Location: 282 km (175 mi) N of Adelaide; 2 km (1 mi) W of Port Augusta
- LGA(s): City of Port Augusta
- Region: Far North
- State electorate(s): Stuart
- Federal division(s): Grey
Mean max temp	Mean min temp	Annual rainfall
26.3 °C; 79 °F	12.1 °C; 54 °F	221.5 mm 8.7 in
Suburbs around Port Augusta West:
Carriewerloo	Carriewerloo	Emeroo
Lincoln Gap	Port Augusta West	Wami Kata; Spencer Gulf
Lincoln Gap; Cultana	Cultana; Commissariat Point	Spencer Gulf
- Footnotes: Adjoining localities

Port Augusta West is a suburb of Port Augusta, South Australia.

However, it has a separate early colonial history to Port Augusta, because it is on the Eyre Peninsula, while the rest of Port Augusta is on the east side of Spencer Gulf. It was not until 1926 that a bridge was built across the head of the Spencer Gulf to connect them, replacing a punt.

The Corporate Town of Port Augusta West was gazetted on 6 October 1887, and only merged into the Corporate Town of Port Augusta on 28 April 1932.

Port Augusta West contains the junction of the Eyre Highway (to Eyre Peninsula and Western Australia), Stuart Highway (to the Far North and Northern Territory), and Augusta Highway (to Adelaide).

== Location, description and land use ==
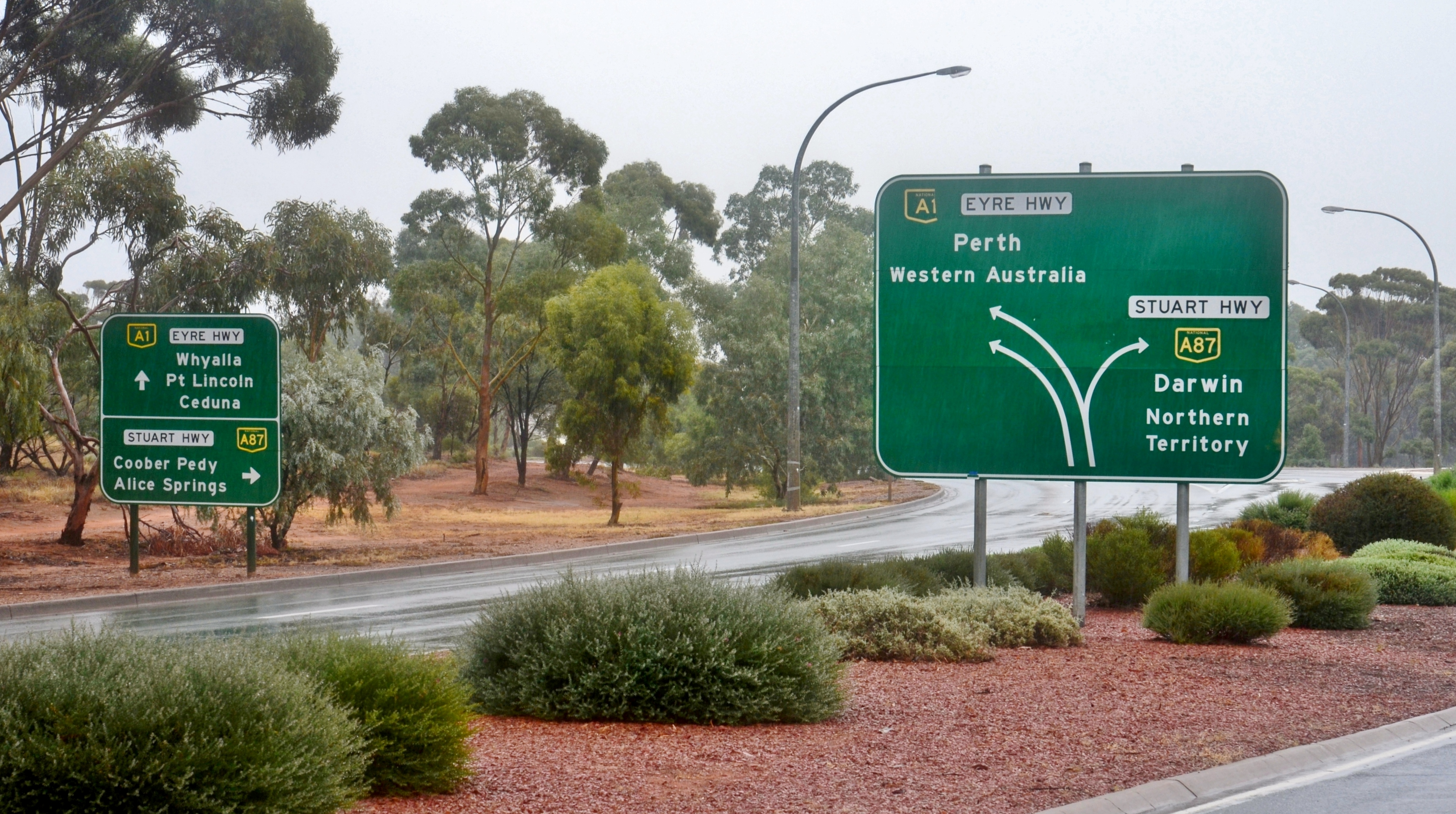
Signs at the junction of the three highways

Port Augusta West is the only part of Port Augusta that is located on the western side of Spencer Gulf on the Eyre Peninsula. It is about 2 kilometres (1.2 miles) west of the centre of Port Augusta and about 280 kilometres (170 miles) north of Adelaide city centre.

Port Augusta West consists of an urban area on the east coast of the Eyre Peninsula, immediately west of the centre of Port Augusta. It is dissected by the Augusta Highway, which branches in the middle of the suburb, to become the Stuart Highway which heads north, and the Eyre Highway which heads west. The Whyalla-Port Augusta railway line passes to the north and west of the suburb’s urban area.

The suburb is mainly residential on the eastern side of the suburb. The area between the Eyre Highway and the Stuart Highway on the west side of the suburb’s built area is zoned for industrial use. The Port Augusta Airport is located to the south end of the suburb and is separated from the residential area by open space and a “vegetation buffer”.

The suburb includes the Port Augusta Golf Club and Port Augusta West Primary School. The suburb also contains the Australian Arid Lands Botanic Garden, West Side Foreshore, Westside Lookout Tower, Rotary Park, Northey Crescent and Sid Welk Park.

The historic Port Augusta West Water Tower in Mitchell Terrace is listed on the South Australian Heritage Register.

== Governance ==
Port Augusta West is located within the federal division of Grey, the state electoral district of Stuart, and the local government area of the City of Port Augusta. The suburb is also located within the South Australian Government region of the Far North.

== Climate ==
Port Augusta West has a warm desert climate (Köppen climate classification BWk).

Climate data for Port Augusta Airport, Port Augusta West
Month	Jan	Feb	Mar	Apr	May	Jun	Jul	Aug	Sep	Oct	Nov	Dec	Year
Mean daily maximum °C (°F)	34.3 (93.7)	33.3 (91.9)	30.3 (86.5)	26.6 (79.9)	21.7 (71.1)	18 (64)	17.7 (63.9)	20.1 (68.2)	24.1 (75.4)	26.9 (80.4)	30.4 (86.7)	31.9 (89.4)	26.3 (79.3)
Mean daily minimum °C (°F)	19.4 (66.9)	18.9 (66.0)	16.4 (61.5)	12.9 (55.2)	8.8 (47.8)	6.2 (43.2)	4.7 (40.5)	5.3 (41.5)	8.5 (47.3)	11.5 (52.7)	15.6 (60.1)	17 (63)	12 (54)
Average precipitation mm (inches)	12.4 (0.49)	18.4 (0.72)	17 (0.7)	18.9 (0.74)	15.4 (0.61)	24.7 (0.97)	18.2 (0.72)	14.6 (0.57)	17.4 (0.69)	16.5 (0.65)	20.6 (0.81)	23.9 (0.94)	217.6 (8.57)
Source: Bureau of Meteorology

== See also ==
- List of cities and towns in South Australia
