= Mount Arden =

- Suburb
- Coordinates: 32°15′25″S 137°42′00″E
- Country: Australia
- State: South Australia
- Region: Far North
- LGAs: City of Port Augusta; Pastoral Unincorporated Area
- Location: 308 km (191 mi) N of Adelaide; 27 km (17 mi) N of Port Augusta
- Established: 26 April 2013

Government
  - State electorate: Giles
  - Federal division: Grey
- Time zone: UTC+9:30 (ACST)
  - Summer (DST): UTC+10:30 (ACST)
- Postcode: 5713
- County: Manchester; Newcastle
- Mean max temp: 26.3 °C (79.3 °F)
- Mean min temp: 12.1 °C (53.8 °F)
- Annual rainfall: 221.5 mm (8.72 in)
Suburbs around Mount Arden
Kootaberra	Kootaberra; Wilkatana Station	Yarrah
Kootaberra; Carriewerloo	Mount Arden	Yarrah; Emeroo
Carriewerloo	Carriewerloo	Emeroo

Mount Arden is a locality in the Australian state of South Australia located about 308 kilometres (191 mi) north of the state capital of Adelaide and about 27 kilometres (17 mi) north of the municipal seat in Port Augusta.

Mount Arden's boundaries were created on 26 April 2013 and given the “local established name” which is derived from the pastoral station of the same name. Its boundaries align approximately with those of the pastoral station.

The area is an arid plain between the Flinders Ranges and the highway and south of Lake Torrens, and exhibits some salt flats.

Mount Arden is located within the federal division of Grey, the state electoral district of Giles, and the local government areas of the City of Port Augusta and the Pastoral Unincorporated Area of South Australia.
