= TAD Australia =

Australian charity providing technical aid to disabled people

Logo of TAD Australia

TAD Australia (also known as Technical Aid to the Disabled) is an Australian federation of state not-for-profit organisation which provide personalised equipment, technology, and services to disabled persons, including children.

TAD was first established in New South Wales in 1975 by George Winston, who was awarded the Member of the Order of Australia for this work.

== Organisation ==
TAD work is done by volunteers, many of whom have special skills and backgrounds in fields including engineering, architecture, and trades. Most of them are retired, and looking for constructive ways to continue using their skills. The client is asked to pay the cost of the materials used, but there is no charge for the labour.

When new designs are created, they are shared across the state organisations.

== Freedom Wheels Program ==
Freedom Wheels is a national program where skilled staff and volunteers work closely with children, families, and therapists to create customized bicycles.

The cost of a Freedom Wheels bicycle can be covered by Australia's National Disability Insurance Scheme (NDIS): it will be itemised by the NDIS as "Assistive Equipment for Recreation" as part of the core supports budget.
