= China Development Forum =

Annual high-level meeting in China

China Development Forum (CDF; Chinese: 中国发展高层论坛) is a high level and annual international forum initiated in 2000 by the China Development Research Foundation (CDRF) of the Development Research Center of the State Council of China. The forum was initially conceived by then Premier Zhu Rongji.

The forum's stated aim is to strengthen communication at a high level between China and the world. The China Development Forum occurs annually after the National People's Congress meets in March.

== History ==
=== 2000 ===
Founded in 2000, the forum is sponsored by the Development Research Center (CDRF), a national public non-profit institution directly under the State Council of China.

At its inception, the forum was a relatively intimate meeting between Chinese leaders and foreign experts. Premier Zhu Rongji initially conceived the idea of the China Development Forum, which he viewed as a stress test for leading officials, and encouraged policy debate and discussion with the foreign experts in attendance. Its scope grew significantly thereafter.

The 1st China Development Forum (CDF) titled "China's 2010 Goals, Policy and Perspective" was opened by Wen Jiabao, Vice Premier of the State Council of China at the time.

=== 2015 ===
At the March 2015 China Development Forum in 2015, OECD secretary-general Angel Gurría commented that China's GDP growth would become increasingly reliant on domestic consumption, sustainable resource use, and rising productivity, which in turn will require a new normal for urbanization.

=== 2017 ===
The 2017 Annual Meeting of the China Development Summit took place from March 18 to 20, 2017, at the Diaoyutai State Guesthouse in Beijing. The forum, centered on the theme "China and the World: Economic Transformation through Structural Reforms," addressed several critical issues, including the enhancement of supply-side structural reform, the implementation of proactive and effective fiscal policy, the prevention and resolution of systemic financial risks, economic globalization, ecological civilization, and the impetus for innovation.

=== 2018 ===
The 2018 Annual Meeting of the China Development Summit took place from March 24 to 26 at the Diaoyutai State Guesthouse in Beijing. The Forum, centered on the theme "China in the New Era," addressed several significant topics, including high-quality development, fiscal and taxation system reform, supply-side structural reform and financial policy, a new paradigm of comprehensive openness, manufacturing in China during high-quality development, and innovation and the future. Attendees included Apple's CEO Tim Cook, Hitachi's Chairman Hiroaki Nakanishi, Starr Companies' Chairman Maurice R. Greenberg, Google's CEO Sundar Pichai, University of Cambridge's Chancellor Stephen Toope and Professor Peter Nolan, and Qualcomm's CEO Steve Mollenkopf.

=== 2019 ===
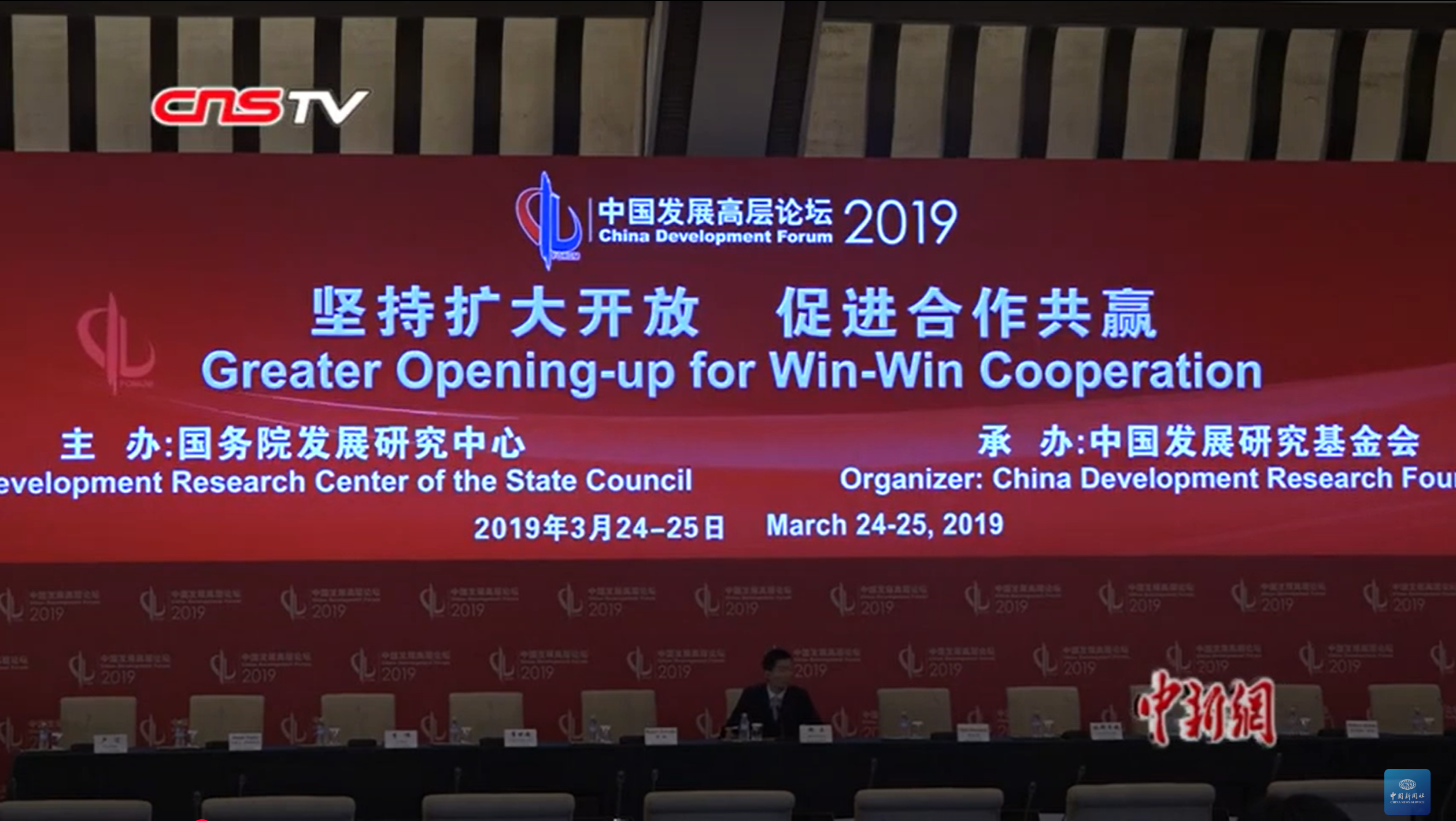
2019 China Development Forum

The 20th forum was held from March 23 to 25, 2019 with Vice Premier Han Zheng of the State Council of China who attended the opening ceremony and delivered a speech.

=== 2020 ===
During the COVID-19 pandemic, the forum occurred virtually.

=== 2021 ===
During the COVID-19 pandemic, the forum occurred virtually.

=== 2023 ===
In 2023, Premier Li Qiang sought to build foreign investment confidence at the forum, tending executives that "China would open its door wider and wider."

=== 2024 ===
The China Development Forum 2024 was held from March 24 to March 25. The theme of this year's forum is "The Continuous Development of China". Chinese Premier Li Qiang participated in the first ceremony of the China Development Forum 2024 on Sunday in Beijing, where he presented a keynote address.

=== 2025 ===
On March 23, 2025, the annual China Development Summit Forum 2025, organized by the Development Research Center of the State Council and hosted by the China Development Research Foundation, convened in Beijing, focusing on the theme "Comprehensively Unleashing the Dynamic Energy of Development and Promoting Stable Growth of the Global Economy."

== See also ==
- Economic history of China (1949–present)
