= John Grill =

John Grill AO (born 1945) is the founder and former chief executive officer of Australian-based engineering company, Worley.

== Biography ==
He was named Engineers Australia Professional Engineer of the Year 2006.

Upon his retirement as CEO, Grill donated $20 million to the University of Sydney to establish the John Grill Centre for Project Leadership.

In January 2014, Grill was appointed an Officer of the Order of Australia for distinguished service to engineering and to business, to the minerals, energy and power supply industries and as a supporter of advanced education and training.

== Fortune ==
Forbes 2006 listed John Grill as #1014 with a net worth of US$1.01 billion. This estimates him as the 19th richest man in Australia and New Zealand.

In a March 2008 ranking of Business Review Weekly's richest Australian executives and managers, John Grill was placed as #8 with a 2007 value of A$861.6 million and total remuneration of $2.59 million.

However, on 5 April 2008, it was reported that John Grill is among Australia's richest executives to be most affected by the global financial turmoil, suffering an estimated share value loss of $585 million.
