= Anthony Liveris =

Australian business person

Personal details
- Born: 2 February 1992 (age 34)
- Relatives: Andrew Liveris (father)
- Education: University of Pennsylvania; University of Oxford
- Occupation: Businessman

Anthony Liveris (born 2 February 1992) is an Australian businessman and CEO of the investment company, Proto Axiom. He is the co-founder of Blackstone-backed data analytics firm, Applecart.

Anthony is the son of former CEO and chairman of The Dow Chemical Company Andrew Liveris.

== Early life and education ==
Liveris studied at the University of Pennsylvania, where he was Vice President of the university's College Republicans chapter. During a push to normalise same-sex relations across Ivy-league universities, Liveris said, "A true conservative should endorse empowering Americans to marry whom they love, not limit them." He went on to study at St. Antony's College at the University of Oxford.

== Career ==
=== Applecart ===
While studying, Liveris cofounded the data-analytics firm, Applecart. Applecart is a platform with $12.5 million in funding and more than $30 million in revenue, that enables advertisers to reach high-value business decision-makers. The platform uses publicly available data to map out the closest personal and professional relationships—the influencers—of those decision-makers that advertiser clients, such as KKR and Boeing, then market to with highly targeted messaging. Endeavor CEO Ari Emanuel is a board member.

In January 2026, Applecart announced a $100 million Series C investment from Blackstone at a $700 million valuation.

=== Proto Axiom ===
Liveris co-found the business and was appointed CEO of Proto Axiom in May 2022.

Proto Axiom is a biotechnology incubator with headquarters in Sydney, Australia. The biotechnology firm has announced partnerships with David A. Sinclair, Catalio Capital Management, and Corrs Chambers Westgarth CEO Gavin MacLaren, among others.

The company raised a Series A of $15 million in 2022.

Proto Axiom raised its Series B in 2024, valuing the company at $100 million.

=== Major League Pickleball Australia & PPA Tour Australia ===
Liveris is the President of Major League Pickleball Australia, the official professional league of Australia. The company has announced a partnership with America’s Major League Pickleball (MLP) forming 12 teams throughout Asia Pacific. Beach Volleyball Olympian Natalie Cook and professional golfer Adam Scott are owners of the Gold Coast Glory.

=== Political affiliations ===
Liveris has worked for Senator Mitt Romney's 2012 Presidential campaign, Tony Blair's Africa Governance Initiative and for former Liberal Prime Minister Malcolm Turnbull. In 2019, Liveris attended the U.S. State Dinner in honour of then Australian Prime Minister Scott Morrison. Following the Australian Federal election of 2022, Liveris published a piece for the Australian Financial Review critical of Senator Amanda Stoker's views on the election. Liveris briefly worked for Andrew Forrest's Fortescue Future Initiative.
