= Giam Swiegers =

South African-Australian business executive

- Born: Guillaume Johannes Swiegers; 27 July 1956 (age 70); Pretoria, Gauteng, South Africa
- Education: University of Pretoria
- Occupations: Chairman, NED and consultant
- Known for: former Global CEO of Aurecon and 12 year CEO of Deloitte Australia

Guillaume Johannes "Giam" Swiegers (born 27 July 1956) is a South African-born Australian business executive. Swiegers was the Global CEO of international engineering company Aurecon from 2015 to 2019, and was previously CEO of Deloitte Australia for twelve years.

== Early life and education ==
Swiegers was born in 1956 in Pretoria, and was educated at Afrikaanse Hoër Seunskool, and graduated from the University of Pretoria with a Bachelor of Commerce (Accounting) (Honours) degree in 1978. Swiegers was a first-class rugby player.

== Early career ==
He joined Deloitte South Africa as an auditor, and also worked for the firm in the United States, before emigrating to Australia in 1997. He was a managing partner of the Queensland practice before moving to Sydney in 2000 where he was appointed chief operating officer of the Australian firm.

== Deloitte CEO ==
After the resignation of the previous CEO Domenic Martino in 2003, Swiegers was appointed CEO of Deloitte Australia. Giam chose Hobart for the company's first meeting of national partners to begin the process of turning Deloitte Australia's operations around. Giam was subsequently appointed member of Deloitte's Global Board and Global Board Governance Committee and was a member of Deloitte's Global Executive Committee from 2010 to 2015. BRW described Swiegers as 'Mr Fix-It' as he has overseen a turnaround in both organisational culture and revenues. Swiegers was also involved heavily in the adoption of new technology, particularly social media including Yammer. This has fostered agility within the organisation.

Swiegers also spearheaded efforts to improve the recognition of women. Swiegers received the 2005 Equal Opportunity for Women in the Workplace Best CEO for the advancement of women in business award. Over 2011–13, the admission of women to Deloitte has increased 30% and the number of female partners has increased over 25-fold over fourteen years. In 2008, Deloitte itself was named Best firm for the advancement of women. The Sex Discrimination Commissioner appointed Swiegers a founding Male Champion of Change. In 2006, Swiegers was named the HR Champion – CEO and Deloitte was named the Inclusive Workplace of the Year in the Australian Human Resources Institute Diversity Awards. When Giam retired from Deloitte in 2015 he was succeeded by Cindy Hook having recruited her from the Deloitte USA firm in 2009.

=== Global CEO Aurecon ===
Swiegers retired from Deloitte Australia on 30 January 2015. Aurecon Chairman Teddy Daka announced Swiegers would commence as Aurecon's new Global CEO effective 1 February 2015. Swiegers' South African background, and extensive experience in Australia, South Africa and the United States was noted in the announcement. Following a very successful four years at Aurecon he retired on 1 February 2019 as was agreed at the time of his appointment.

In 2020 the AFR named Aurecon Australia's most innovative company as well as most Innovative professional service firm in Australia. This was achieved after being rated one of Australia's most innovative companies in 2016, 2017 and 2019.

At the close of his career at Aurecon Giam wrote a note to all stakeholders reflecting on his time at Aurecon and the gift(s) that Aurecon gave him. This note has been widely distributed https://justimagine.aurecongroup.com/gift-aurecon-giam-swiegers/

== Board appointments ==
Giam was appointed as the Chairman of Aurecon on 1 January 2021 after serving on the Board as a NED from 1 July 2019 to 31 December 2020.

Giam was also appointed as Chairman of Brisbane based finance company Attvest on 1 April 2021.

Giam is a NED of The Australian Design Council.

He has started his own consulting company Learntthehardway consulting and consults to several organisations with focus on strategy and strategy execution through an emphasis on culture.

Swiegers was a member of the University of Technology, Sydney Vice-Chancellor's Advisory Board and the Australian School of Business (University of New South Wales) Business Advisory Council. Swiegers was also a member of the Art Gallery of New South Wales President's Council.

== Personal life ==
Swiegers plays golf, is a fly fisherman and oenophile.

Swiegers' alma mater, the University of Pretoria, awarded Swiegers a laureate in 2009.

Business positions
Preceded by Domenic Martino	CEO of Deloitte Australia; 2003–present	Incumbent
