= Wami Kata, South Australia =

Wami Kata South Australia
- Coordinates: 32°26′44″S 137°48′15″E
- Population: 19 (SAL 2021)
- Established: 17 February 1994
- Postcode(s): 5700
- Time zone: ACST (UTC+9:30)
  - Summer (DST): ACST (UTC+10:30)
- LGA(s): City of Port Augusta
- Region: Far North
- County: Frome
- State electorate(s): Stuart
- Federal division(s): Grey
Mean max temp	Mean min temp	Annual rainfall
26.4 °C; 80 °F	12.1 °C; 54 °F	215.0 mm 8.5 in
Suburbs around Wami Kata:
Port Augusta West	Emeroo	Emeroo
Port Augusta West	Wami Kata	Mundallio
Port Augusta West	Port Augusta; Davenport	Stirling North

Wami Kata is a suburb in the Far North region of South Australia, situated within the City of Port Augusta.

It was named and its boundaries created in February 1994, named for the Aboriginal community. The name means "head of the snake" in Pitjantjatjara. A section of Wami Kata was severed and included into the new locality of Emeroo in 2013, and a further portion in its south severed, along with a section of neighbouring Port Augusta, to create the new suburb of Davenport in 2014. Following the creation of Davenport in 2014, the Wami Kata Old Folks Home now lies within Davenport.

The historic former Emeroo Station Ostrich Farm, which is listed on the South Australian Heritage Register, lies mostly within Wami Kata; a portion also lies on its border with Emeroo.

The Trans-Australian Railway runs along its western edge, but has never stopped within its current boundaries, and the Marree railway line is near the eastern boundary.

The Hutley Estate subdivision is located within Wami Kata.

== See also ==
- List of cities and towns in South Australia
