= Aurecon =

Multinational construction and civil engineering company

- Company type: Private, owned in trust
- Industry: Engineering, Design and Business Consultation
- Predecessor: Africon; Connell Wagner; Ninham Shand
- Founded: 2009
- Headquarters: Docklands, Victoria, Australia
- Key people: Louise Adams (civil engineer), CEO; Giam Swiegers, Non-Executive Chairman; Scott Powell, COO
- Revenue: A$1.06 billion (2020)
- Net income: A$64.5 million
- Number of employees: 6,500+
- Website: www.aurecongroup.com

Aurecon Group Pty Ltd is an Australian engineering, project management and consulting company based in Docklands, Victoria, with operations in Australia, New Zealand and Southeast Asia.

== History ==
Formed through the merger of three engineering consultancies, Africon, Connell Wagner and Ninham Shand. Aurecon has over 6,500 staff members. The company operates in 28 countries across Africa, Asia-Pacific and the Middle East.

Africon was formed in 1935. The original business, Van Wyk en Louw Consulting, grew as one of the 'top 5' engineering consulting firms under apartheid, winning lucrative government contracts including management of 'townships' before changing its name to Africon during South Africa's transformation to democracy. At the time of the merger, Africon was ranked amongst the world’s top 200 international design firms and was South Africa’s largest engineering company. The organisation operated in both the public and private sectors within the fields of transportation, property, municipal services, energy and mining.

Connell Wagner, founded in 1989 after the merger of John Connell's Connell Group and Eric Wagner's MacDonald Wagner, was one of Asia Pacific’s largest multi-disciplinary engineering consultancies, with a history spanning more than 75 years. The firm provided a broad range of professional technical services across several market sectors, namely buildings, industrial, transportation, urban development, water, international development, environment, energy, telecommunications and defence.

Established by Ninham Shand in 1935, Ninham Shand was one of South Africa’s leading, privately owned companies of consulting engineers and environmental scientists. The organisation offered consulting services in areas including water resources and supply, heavy engineering, purification, infrastructure services, structures and buildings, transportation and roads, and environmental science.

In October 2019, Aurecon decided to demerge its African business.
