= Australian Arid Lands Botanic Garden =

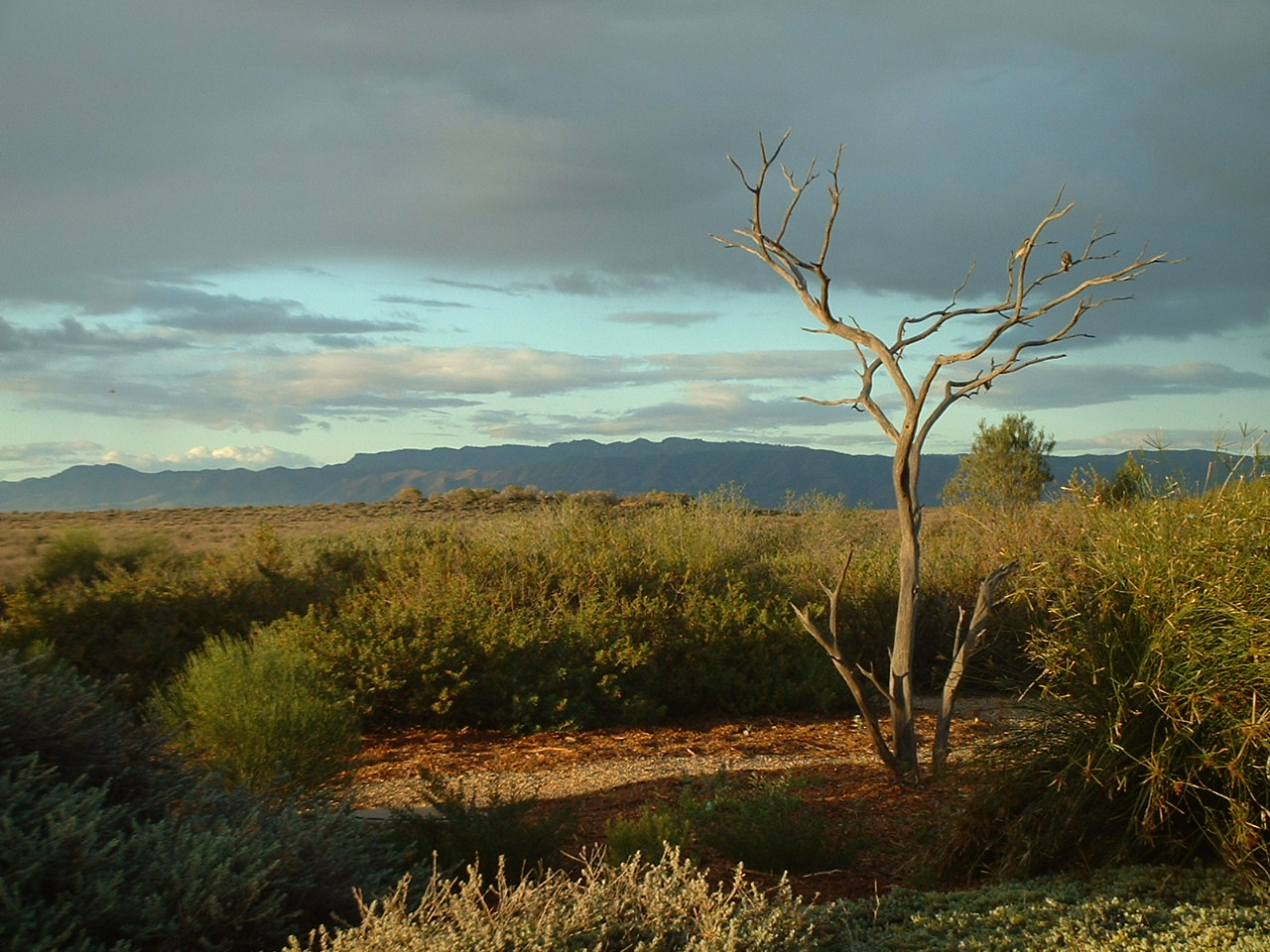
- Interactive map of Australian Arid Lands Botanic Garden
- Type: Botanical
- Location: Port Augusta West
- Coordinates: 32.4616°S 137.7432°E
- Area: 250 hectares (620 acres)
- Opened: 1996
- Owner: Port Augusta City Council
- Operator: Port Augusta City Council
- Collections: Australian Natives
- Budget: Government funding and private donations
- Website: aalbg.sa.gov.au

The Australian Arid Lands Botanic Garden is located on the Stuart Highway, 1.4 kilometres north of the Eyre Highway in Port Augusta West, South Australia. The garden was established in the 1980s and opened in September 1996. It is an initiative of the City of Port Augusta and corporate funding, and very limited state-government support. The Botanic Garden is open 7 days a week, except Christmas Day, from 7:30 am to sunset.

== History ==
The concept for the garden was proposed in 1981 by John Zwar, when he was Port Augusta's first Parks & Gardens Superintendent.

The first master plan was created by Kinhill Steams in 1986; however, the current Australian Arid Lands Botanic Garden was designed by the landscape architect Grant Henderson. As the architect, Henderson played a detrimental role in the cultivation of the arid zone conservation conducted by the gardens.

In 1984 the Friends of the Australian Arid Lands Botanic Garden was formed to promote, seek funds and, in the early stages, lobby for the development of the gardens.

Over the years more infrastructure has been built to accommodate the growing garden. In 1993 a lookout was created overlooking the garden; the reception building was created in 1996; in 1998 the Herbarium meeting room was constructed; toilet facilities were introduced in 2001 and the sealing of walking tracks was completed in 2005 and upgrades to the irrigation in 2007.

== Description and purpose ==
The garden is owned and run by the City of Port Augusta "for the benefit of the local and wider community".

The gardens support an extensive range of flora intended to promote Australia's natives. Some of the aims of the Botanic Garden are to bring attention to the arid zone ecosystem conservation, draw attention to the economic significance of arid-zone agriculture and create a better understanding of the arid-zone environment amongst the general public.

The garden has an interpretive centre, cafe and gift shop.

== Friends ==
As of 2020 John Zwar is President of the Friends of the Australian Arid Lands Botanic Garden. There are sub-groups in Friends that contribute to the running of the Garden in which they conduct tours and propagate plants either for further growth in the gardens or for sale in the community. In more recent years the Friends have expanded its role to include public education, activities and informative newsletters.

== Collections ==
Port Augusta only receives an annual mean rainfall of 209.7mm. Whilst this is still much lower than other areas in South Australia, such as Adelaide which receives 536mm per year, more central locations like Coober Pedy which only receives 158mm annually. Due to this high level of rainfall, in comparison to most desert or arid lands worldwide, Port Augusta can only be considered "moderately arid". The plants at the Garden may also experience changes to the climate in adverse ways such as the increase in temperature and the subsequent variability of rainfall. The Garden is made up of plants collected predominantly from the driest regions of South and Western Australia. Of these plants, it is evidenced that they had a thermal tolerance of 6 degrees Celsius, potentially securing them from heat stress.

Within the 250 hectares that make up the Australian Arid Lands Botanic Garden, the primary feature is the Australian and overseas plants from arid environments. The primary use of the space is for conservation, where besides initial planting, continued weed and pest control, these areas are left untended. Closer to the visitors centre are the “intensive planning zones” which include the Eremophila Garden, Eyre Region, Gawler Region, Flinders Region, Central Ranges, Great Victoria Desert.

The Eremophila Garden contains around 155 different varieties, one of the largest collections of its kind. Eremophila, or emu bush, are small shrubs and trees with sticky or shiny leaves which produce colourful flowers and fruit. Within Australia there are 180 native species of Eremophila. These plants are sold during the biennial “Eremophila Festival” in addition to other plants by the Friends of the Australian Arid Lands Botanic Garden.

The gardens also contain mangroves and samphire along Spencer Gulf along the Eastern boundary. These are accessible via a boardwalk.

== See also ==
- List of botanical gardens in Australia
- List of parks and gardens in rural South Australia
