= Worley (company) =

Australian professional services company

Worley Limited
- Type: Public
- Traded as: ASX: WOR
- Industry: Energy, chemicals and resources
- Founded: 1971
- Founder: John Grill
- Headquarters: Sydney, New South Wales, Australia
- Area served: Worldwide
- Key people: Chris Ashton (CEO and Managing Director); John Grill (Chair and NED); Justine Travers (CFO)
- Revenue: ▲ A$12,050 million (2025)
- Number of employees: 45,505 people as of July 2025
- Subsidiaries: Worley Consulting; Worley Rosenberg; Worley Comprimo; Worley Chemetics
- Website: www.worley.com

Worley Limited is an Australian engineering and professional services company which provides consulting and project delivery expertise to the energy, chemicals and resources sectors, and complex process industries.

== History ==
=== Early history ===
John Grill (chief executive officer 1975–2012), joined Smith, de Kantzow & Wholohan, which led to the 1976 establishment Wholohan Grill and Partners, a small Australian engineering consultancy. Wholohan Grill and Partners grew steadily throughout the 1970s and 80s.

In 1987, Wholohan Grill and Partners acquired the Australian interests of Worley, an American-based engineering firm founded by Steve Worley. The company changed its name to Worley and from this point began expanding steadily, securing long-term contracts in Brunei, Malaysia, Thailand and Singapore, and creating local joint ventures, most of which are still active today.

In the 1990s, Worley expanded both its industry sector and geographical footprint. A policy of diversification saw Worley grow from its roots in the hydrocarbons sector into the power, infrastructure and environment, and minerals and metals sectors. At the start of the new millennium, Worley was well poised to continue its industry sector and geographic expansion with 30 offices and 3,000 personnel globally. This success enabled Worley to diversify further through additional partnerships and acquisitions.

=== 2000s ===
In 2002 Worley became a publicly listed company on the Australian Securities Exchange, leading to a period of increased global acquisitions, including companies in Canada, Oman, and China. In 2004, Worley acquired Parsons E&C. Parsons E&C had its own history stemming back to 1944, when Ralph M. Parsons started what is now the Parsons Corporation in Los Angeles. In 2002, Parsons Corporation separated Parsons E&C from its other business units. Worley merged operations with Parsons E&C and commenced trading as WorleyParsons.

Further acquisitions included Astron in 2004, and Komex, which was involved in environmental services, in 2005, DRPL in the power sector, TMG and Watkins & Godwin in the infrastructure sector, HG Engineering, Gas Cleaning Technologies, and Jones & Jones in the mineral and metals sector, continued to deepen and broaden WorleyParsons' capability and geographic presence.

In 2006, WorleyParsons entered the South American market through a joint venture with Santiago-based ARA, a leading base metals and infrastructure engineering firm, and Colt Companies, Canada's largest engineering and project services firm, became part of the WorleyParsons family in 2007. Later that year, the companies Patterson Britton and Partners, and John Wilson and Partners, were acquired, both consultants in the water and environmental services market in Australia, with specific capabilities in the coastal and marine, water resources and waste water, environmental, civil and structural and power markets. That provided a significant expansion of the organisation's ability to support its customers in the areas of water and environmental services. In November 2007, WorleyParsons' capability in the nuclear consulting and analysis segment of the international nuclear industry was complemented with the acquisition of Polestar and UniField Engineering, with the aim of further expanding its presence in the U.S. electrical power business.

WorleyParsons also developed its business in Africa, with the establishment of offices in Egypt and Libya, joint venture in Nigeria as DeltaAfrik with Delta Tek Engineering and by the 2008 acquisition of a 50% share in Pangaea – a Pretoria-based project services company, which was renamed PangaeaWorleyParsons.

The acquisitions of SEA Engineering in 2007, and INTEC (now known as INTECSEA) in April 2008, both international offshore deep-water hydrocarbons engineering and project services companies, strategically positioned the company to provide large-scale integrated deep-water facilities, subsea and marine systems projects.

The acquisition of Westmar in 2008, a Canadian-based marine and port facility, resource and mining infrastructure, bulk material handling and transportation specialist, extended the Infrastructure and Minerals & Metals capabilities in both Canada and international markets.

In 2009, WorleyParsons acquired the United Kingdom assets of Day & Zimmermann to form the hub of WorleyParsons' UK Improve business. The same year saw the acquisition of Brazilian based on CNEC. The capability of CNEC complements the existing capabilities of WorleyParsons' resource and energy businesses.

=== 2010s ===
In 2010, WorleyParsons acquired the business advisory services company, Evans & Peck. Operating in Australia and China, Evans & Peck provide services across the transport, power and energy, resources, water and social infrastructure sectors.

More recently, the acquisition of Kwezi V3 Engineers, (KV3) a leading South African engineering firm in 2011 and TWP Holdings (Proprietary) Limited ("TWP") in 2013 gives WorleyParsons' customers access to the specialized underground mine planning and engineering capabilities, mineral processing and project management of TWP.

In 2012, WorleyParsons purchased a 50% share in a joint venture company with Cegertec in Quebec, Canada.

In 2013, WorleyParsons acquired Bergen Group Rosenberg AS ("Rosenberg"). Worley Rosenberg is a wholly owned subsidiary of Bergen Group ASA, a listed Norwegian company.

In 2014, WorleyParsons acquired MTG, Ltd., an American management consulting firm in the oil and gas, petrochemicals and chemicals industries with operations in North America, the United Kingdom and Australia.

In October 2018, WorleyParsons reached an agreement with Jacobs to take over its ECR business line for $3.3 billion. The transaction was completed in April 2019. The total number of employees of the combined organisation now employs 57,600 people in 51 countries.

Logo from 2019 to 2023

In April 2019, it was announced that the company would re-brand to Worley, subject to approval at its October 2019 Annual General Meeting. Chris Ashton was named as the new CEO, to replace Andrew Wood, effective from 24 February 2020.

In November 2023, Worley launched a refreshed brand direction, which included a new logo and a consolidation of its portfolio of subsidiaries. Advisian, Chemetics, Comprimo, Cord, Intecsea, and Rosenberg were all combined under the single Worley brand. New portfolio subsidiaries now include Industries, Services and Technology, and Worley Consulting.

== See also ==
- List of oilfield service companies
