= Carriewerloo =

Pastoral lease in South Australia

Coordinates: 32.399°S 137.228°E

Location in South Australia

Carriewerloo Station is a pastoral lease that operates as a sheep station in South Australia.

It is situated approximately 38 kilometres (24 mi) north of Iron Knob and 52 kilometres (32 mi) west of Port Augusta.

The property was established at some time prior to 1863 when it was owned by James Loudon. In 1865, the property was sold at auction. At this time it occupied an area of 529 square miles (1,370 km^{2}) and was carrying 5,272 head of sheep.

George Charles Hawker acquired the station in 1869 and spent much time and money in improving it.

The Hawker brothers put Carriewerloo on the market in 1906 along with Parallana, Kolendoa and Moonaree Stations. At his time Carriewerloo occupied an area of 887 square miles (2,297 km^{2}) of first class saltbush country. It was stocked with 33,000 Bungaree bred sheep.

Scenes from the film The Sundowners were filmed at the property in 1959 and 1960.

In 2007 the property was owned by the Michael family. It was carrying a flock of about 25,000 sheep with shearing producing approximately 6 kilograms (13 lb) of wool with an average thickness of 22 microns.

The land occupying the extent of the Carriewerloo pastoral lease was gazetted by the Government of South Australia as a locality in April 2013 under the name Carriewerloo.

The Aurora Solar Thermal Power Project is proposed to be constructed from 2018 and producing 495 GWh of electricity annually from 2020. It will be 30 kilometres (19 mi) north of Port Augusta on Carriewerloo Station.

== See also ==
- List of ranches and stations
