= Athletics at the 2004 Summer Paralympics – Women's 400 metres T52–54 =

Women's 400m races for wheelchair athletes at the 2004 Summer Paralympics were held in the Athens Olympic Stadium. Events were held in three disability classes.

== T52 ==
Women's 400m T52 at the XII Paralympic Games
- Venue: Athens Olympic Stadium
- Dates: 23–24 September 2004
- Competitors: 10 from 7 nations
- Winning time: 1:09.52

Medalists
1st place, gold medalist(s)		Lisa Franks	Canada
2nd place, silver medalist(s)		Lucía Sosa	Mexico
3rd place, bronze medalist(s)		Leticia Torres	Mexico

The T52 event consisted of 2 heats and a final. It was won by Lisa Franks, representing Canada.

=== 1st Round ===
Qualified for next round

Heat 1

23 Sept. 2004, 19:35

Rank	Athlete	Time	Notes
1	Lisa Franks (CAN)	1:11.95	PR Q
2	Lucía Sosa (MEX)	1:21.37	Q
3	Erin Johnson (USA)	1:26.22	Q
4	Teri Thorson (CAN)	1:26.83	q
5	Karen Lewis-Archer (GBR)	1:27.46	

Heat 2

23 Sept. 2004, 19:42

Rank	Athlete	Time	Notes
1	Pia Schmid (SUI)	1:23.15	Q
2	Miki Yoda (JPN)	1:23.42	Q
3	Leticia Torres (MEX)	1:24.57	Q
4	Gemma Buchholz (AUS)	1:26.26	q
5	Karen March (CAN)	1:28.31	

=== Final Round ===
24 Sept. 2004, 21:35

Rank	Athlete	Time	Notes
1st place, gold medalist(s)	Lisa Franks (CAN)	1:09.52	WR
2nd place, silver medalist(s)	Lucía Sosa (MEX)	1:20.79	
3rd place, bronze medalist(s)	Leticia Torres (MEX)	1:22.27	
4	Pia Schmid (SUI)	1:22.61	
5	Gemma Buchholz (AUS)	1:22.67	
6	Miki Yoda (JPN)	1:24.13	
7	Erin Johnson (USA)	1:25.33	
8	Teri Thorson (CAN)	1:25.62	

== T53 ==
Women's 400m T53 at the XII Paralympic Games
- Venue: Athens Olympic Stadium
- Dates: 25–27 September 2004
- Competitors: 9 from 7 nations
- Winning time: 57.36

Medalists
1st place, gold medalist(s)		Tanni Grey-Thompson OBE	Great Britain
2nd place, silver medalist(s)		Madelene Nordlund	Sweden
3rd place, bronze medalist(s)		Francesca Porcellato	Italy

The T53 event consisted of 2 heats and a final. It was won by Tanni Grey-Thompson OBE, representing Great Britain.

=== 1st Round ===
Qualified for next round

Heat 1

25 Sept. 2004, 18:00

Rank	Athlete	Time	Notes
1	Madelene Nordlund (SWE)	57.37	PR Q
2	Francesca Porcellato (ITA)	57.46	Q
3	Jessica Galli (USA)	58.46	Q
4	Miriam Nibley (USA)	1:01.39	q
5	Thi Khoa Nhu (VIE)	1:03.26	

Heat 2

25 Sept. 2004, 18:07

Rank	Athlete	Time	Notes
1	Tanni Grey-Thompson OBE (GBR)	58.09	Q
2	Shirley Reilly (USA)	1:01.40	Q
3	Anne Wafula (KEN)	1:02.85	Q
4	Angela Ballard (AUS)	1:03.01	q

=== Final Round ===
27 Sept. 2004, 10:50

Rank	Athlete	Time	Notes
1st place, gold medalist(s)	Tanni Grey-Thompson OBE (GBR)	57.36	PR
2nd place, silver medalist(s)	Madelene Nordlund (SWE)	58.32	
3rd place, bronze medalist(s)	Francesca Porcellato (ITA)	59.59	
4	Jessica Galli (USA)	1:01.00	
5	Shirley Reilly (USA)	1:01.01	
6	Miriam Nibley (USA)	1:02.13	
7	Angela Ballard (AUS)	1:02.73	
8	Anne Wafula (KEN)	1:04.48	

== T54 ==
Women's 400m T54 at the XII Paralympic Games
- Venue: Athens Olympic Stadium
- Dates: 25–27 September 2004
- Competitors: 17 from 11 nations
- Winning time: 51.91

Medalists
1st place, gold medalist(s)		Chantal Petitclerc	Canada
2nd place, silver medalist(s)		Louise Sauvage	Australia
3rd place, bronze medalist(s)		Diane Roy	Canada

The T54 event consisted of 3 heats and a final. It was won by Chantal Petitclerc, representing Canada

Heat 1

Rank	Athlete	Time	Notes
1	Diane Roy (CAN)	56.82	Q
2	Rachel Potter (GBR)	1:01.23	Q
3	Messaouda Sifi (TUN)	1:02.16	
4	Simone Buess (SUI)	1:02.18	
5	Ezzouha Edidal (MTN)	1:28.75	
	Wen Qing (CHN)	DNS	

Heat 2

Rank	Athlete	Time	Notes
1	Jessica Matassa (CAN)	56.41	Q
2	Tatyana McFadden (USA)	56.70	Q
3	Eliza Stankovic (AUS)	56.76	Q
4	Manuela Schaer (SUI)	57.95	q
5	Chen Yu Lien (TPE)	59.65	
6	Yazmith Bataz (MEX)	1:02.02	

Heat 3

Rank	Athlete	Time	Notes
1	Chantal Petitclerc (CAN)	54.38	Q
2	Louise Sauvage (AUS)	55.72	Q
3	Yvonne Sehmisch (GER)	59.20	
4	Samira Berri (TUN)	1:00.20	
5	Jennifer Goeckel (USA)	1:00.81	

=== Final Round ===
Rank	Athlete	Time	Notes
1st place, gold medalist(s)	Chantal Petitclerc (CAN)	51.91	
2nd place, silver medalist(s)	Louise Sauvage (AUS)	53.42	
3rd place, bronze medalist(s)	Diane Roy (CAN)	54.80	
4	Jessica Matassa (CAN)	55.51	
5	Tatyana McFadden (USA)	56.24	
6	Manuela Schaer (SUI)	56.47	
7	Eliza Stankovic (AUS)	57.01	
8	Rachel Potter (GBR)	1:00.46	
