= Athletics at the 2004 Summer Paralympics – Women's 200 metres T52–54 =

Women's 200m races for wheelchair athletes at the 2004 Summer Paralympics were held in the Athens Olympic Stadium. Events were held in two disability classes.

== T52 ==
Women's 200m T52 at the XII Paralympic Games
- Venue: Athens Olympic Stadium
- Dates: 25–26 September 2004
- Competitors: 9 from 7 nations
- Winning time: 36.72

Medalists
| 1st place, gold medalist(s) | | Lisa Franks | Canada |
| 2nd place, silver medalist(s) | | Pia Schmid | Switzerland |
| 3rd place, bronze medalist(s) | | Leticia Torres | Mexico |

The T52 event consisted of 2 heats and a final. It was won by Lisa Franks, representing Canada.

=== 1st Round ===
| Qualified for next round |

Heat 1

25 Sept. 2004, 18:45

| Rank | Athlete | Time | Notes |
|---|---|---|---|
| 1 | Lisa Franks (CAN) | 36.63 | WR Q |
| 2 | Pia Schmid (SUI) | 40.42 | Q |
| 3 | Leticia Torres (MEX) | 41.93 | Q |
| 4 | Gemma Buchholz (AUS) | 42.15 | q |
| 5 | Karen Lewis-Archer (GBR) | 43.11 | q |

Heat 2

25 Sept. 2004, 18:51

| Rank | Athlete | Time | Notes |
|---|---|---|---|
| 1 | Erin Johnson (USA) | 41.47 | Q |
| 2 | Miki Yoda (JPN) | 42.40 | Q |
| 3 | Karen March (CAN) | 43.45 | Q |
| 4 | Lucia Sosa (MEX) | 43.73 | |

=== Final Round ===
26 Sept. 2004, 20:05

| Rank | Athlete | Time | Notes |
|---|---|---|---|
| 1st place, gold medalist(s) | Lisa Franks (CAN) | 36.72 | |
| 2nd place, silver medalist(s) | Pia Schmid (SUI) | 41.04 | |
| 3rd place, bronze medalist(s) | Leticia Torres (MEX) | 41.49 | |
| 4 | Erin Johnson (USA) | 42.48 | |
| 5 | Miki Yoda (JPN) | 43.27 | |
| 6 | Gemma Buchholz (AUS) | 43.81 | |
| 7 | Karen Lewis-Archer (GBR) | 44.98 | |
| 8 | Karen March (CAN) | 45.34 | |

== T54 ==
Women's 200m T54 at the XII Paralympic Games
- Venue: Athens Olympic Stadium
- Dates: 26–27 September 2004
- Competitors: 17 from 12 nations
- Winning time: 28.95

Medalists
| 1st place, gold medalist(s) | | Chantal Petitclerc | Canada |
| 2nd place, silver medalist(s) | | Manuela Schaer | Switzerland |
| 3rd place, bronze medalist(s) | | Tatyana McFadden | United States |

The T54 event consisted of 3 heats and a final. It was won by Chantal Petitclerc, representing Canada.

=== 1st Round ===
| Qualified for next round |

Heat 1

26 Sept. 2004, 21:45

| Rank | Athlete | Time | Notes |
|---|---|---|---|
| 1 | Chantal Petitclerc (CAN) | 29.14 | Q |
| 2 | Tanni Grey-Thompson OBE (GBR) | 30.75 | Q |
| 3 | Yvonne Sehmisch (GER) | 31.48 | q |
| 4 | Yazmith Bataz (MEX) | 33.77 | |
| 5 | Simone Buess (SUI) | 34.07 | |

Heat 2

26 Sept. 2004, 21:51

| Rank | Athlete | Time | Notes |
|---|---|---|---|
| 1 | Tatyana McFadden (USA) | 30.73 | Q |
| 2 | Jessica Matassa (CAN) | 31.24 | Q |
| 3 | Chen Yu Lien (TPE) | 31.69 | q |
| 4 | Angela Ballard (AUS) | 33.14 | |
| 5 | Marleny Chauez (ESA) | 40.01 | |
| 6 | Salatchee Murday (MRI) | 44.40 | |

Heat 3

26 Sept. 2004, 21:57

| Rank | Athlete | Time | Notes |
|---|---|---|---|
| 1 | Manuela Schaer (SUI) | 30.11 | Q |
| 2 | Eliza Stankovic (AUS) | 31.58 | Q |
| 3 | Wen Qing (CHN) | 31.83 | |
| 4 | Jennifer Goeckel (USA) | 32.12 | |
| 5 | Rachel Potter (GBR) | 32.41 | |
| 6 | Thi Khoa Nhu (VIE) | 35.98 | |

=== Final Round ===
27 Sept. 2004, 20:10

| Rank | Athlete | Time | Notes |
|---|---|---|---|
| 1st place, gold medalist(s) | Chantal Petitclerc (CAN) | 28.95 | |
| 2nd place, silver medalist(s) | Manuela Schaer (SUI) | 30.24 | |
| 3rd place, bronze medalist(s) | Tatyana McFadden (USA) | 30.48 | |
| 4 | Tanni Grey-Thompson OBE (GBR) | 30.54 | |
| 5 | Jessica Matassa (CAN) | 30.93 | |
| 6 | Yvonne Sehmisch (GER) | 31.17 | |
| 7 | Eliza Stankovic (AUS) | 31.36 | |
| 8 | Chen Yu Lien (TPE) | 31.70 | |
