= Athletics at the 2004 Summer Paralympics – Women's 800 metres T53–54 =

Women's 800m races for wheelchair athletes at the 2004 Summer Paralympics were held in the Athens Olympic Stadium. Events were held in two disability classes.

== T53 ==
Women's 800m T53 at the XII Paralympic Games
- Venue: Athens Olympic Stadium
- Dates: 19–20 September 2004
- Competitors: 9 from 7 nations
- Winning time: 1:59.05

Medalists
1st place, gold medalist(s)		Cheri Blauwet	United States
2nd place, silver medalist(s)		Francesca Porcellato	Italy
3rd place, bronze medalist(s)		Madelene Nordlund	Sweden

The T53 event consisted of 2 heats and a final. It was won by Cheri Blauwet, representing United States.

=== 1st Round ===
Qualified for next round

Heat 1

19 Sept. 2004, 19:10

Rank	Athlete	Time	Notes
1	Cheri Blauwet (USA)	1:56.54	Q
2	Tanni Grey-Thompson OBE (GBR)	1:57.11	Q
3	Jessica Galli (USA)	1:57.26	Q
4	Madelene Nordlund (SWE)	1:58.03	q
5	Irina Dezhurova (RUS)	2:15.86	q

Heat 2

19 Sept. 2004, 19:18

Rank	Athlete	Time	Notes
1	Francesca Porcellato (ITA)	2:07.67	Q
2	Shirley Reilly (USA)	2:07.99	Q
3	Angela Ballard (AUS)	2:08.81	Q
4	Anne Wafula (KEN)	2:19.61	

=== Final Round ===
20 Sept. 2004, 20:00

Rank	Athlete	Time	Notes
1st place, gold medalist(s)	Cheri Blauwet (USA)	1:59.05	
2nd place, silver medalist(s)	Francesca Porcellato (ITA)	1:59.55	
3rd place, bronze medalist(s)	Madelene Nordlund (SWE)	2:00.30	
4	Jessica Galli (USA)	2:01.03	
5	Angela Ballard (AUS)	2:02.29	
6	Shirley Reilly (USA)	2:02.81	
7	Tanni Grey-Thompson OBE (GBR)	2:03.11	
8	Irina Dezhurova (RUS)	2:17.98	

== T54 ==
Women's 800m T54 at the XII Paralympic Games
- Venue: Athens Olympic Stadium
- Dates: 21–22 September 2004
- Competitors: 16 from 8 nations
- Winning time: 1:50.69

Medalists
1st place, gold medalist(s)		Chantal Petitclerc	Canada
2nd place, silver medalist(s)		Louise Sauvage	Australia
3rd place, bronze medalist(s)		Jessica Matassa	Canada

The T54 event consisted of 2 heats and a final. It was won by Chantal Petitclerc, representing Canada.

=== 1st Round ===
Qualified for next round

Heat 1

21 Sept. 2004, 09:20

Rank	Athlete	Time	Notes
1	Chantal Petitclerc (CAN)	1:53.28	Q
2	Eliza Stankovic (AUS)	1:53.78	Q
3	Christie Dawes (AUS)	1:54.24	Q
4	Samira Berri (TUN)	1:54.53	q
5	Yumi Kawashima (JPN)	1:55.76	
6	Sandra Graf (SUI)	1:56.11	
7	Jennifer Goeckel (USA)	1:56.15	
8	Ivonne Reyes (MEX)	2:05.52	

Heat 2

21 Sept. 2004, 09:27

Rank	Athlete	Time	Notes
1	Louise Sauvage (AUS)	1:53.27	Q
2	Diane Roy (CAN)	1:53.44	Q
3	Jessica Matassa (CAN)	1:53.54	Q
4	Edith Hunkeler (SUI)	1:53.61	q
5	Tatyana McFadden (USA)	1:55.15	
6	Ariadne Hernández (MEX)	1:55.24	
7	Ajara Mohammed (GHA)	1:59.14	
8	Messaouda Sifi (TUN)	2:00.34	

=== Final Round ===
22 Sept. 2004, 19:35

Rank	Athlete	Time	Notes
1st place, gold medalist(s)	Chantal Petitclerc (CAN)	1:50.69	PR
2nd place, silver medalist(s)	Louise Sauvage (AUS)	1:50.88	
3rd place, bronze medalist(s)	Jessica Matassa (CAN)	1:51.98	
4	Edith Hunkeler (SUI)	1:52.13	
5	Diane Roy (CAN)	1:52.14	
6	Christie Dawes (AUS)	1:52.51	
7	Eliza Stankovic (AUS)	1:52.79	
8	Samira Berri (TUN)	1:54.14	
