= Matassa =

Matassa is a surname. Notable people with the surname include:

- Cosimo Matassa (1926–2014), American recording engineer and studio owner
- Jessica Matassa (born 1986), Canadian paralympic athlete
- Lisa Matassa, American singer-songwriter
- Marco Matassa, Italian Formula One engineer

== Other ==
- La matassa, a 2009 Italian comedy film
