= Non-covalent interactions index =

Visualization method in chemistry

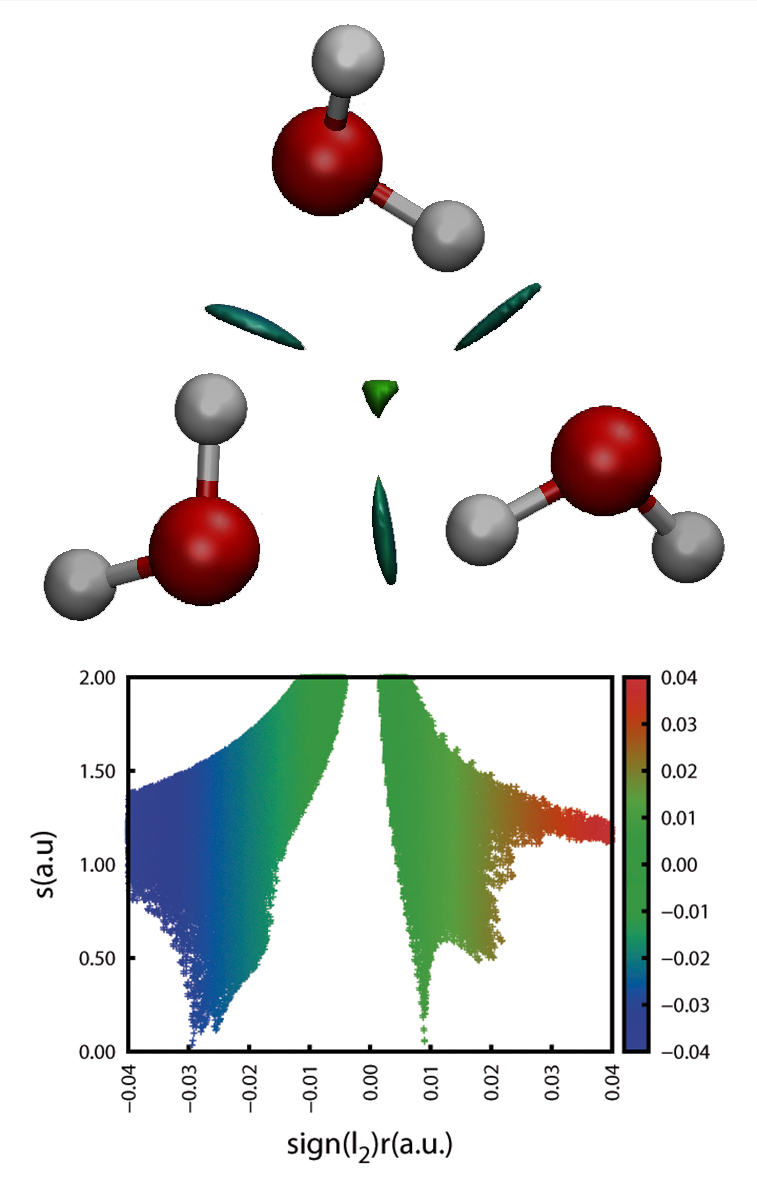
NCI representation in 3D and 2D of a three water molecules cluster

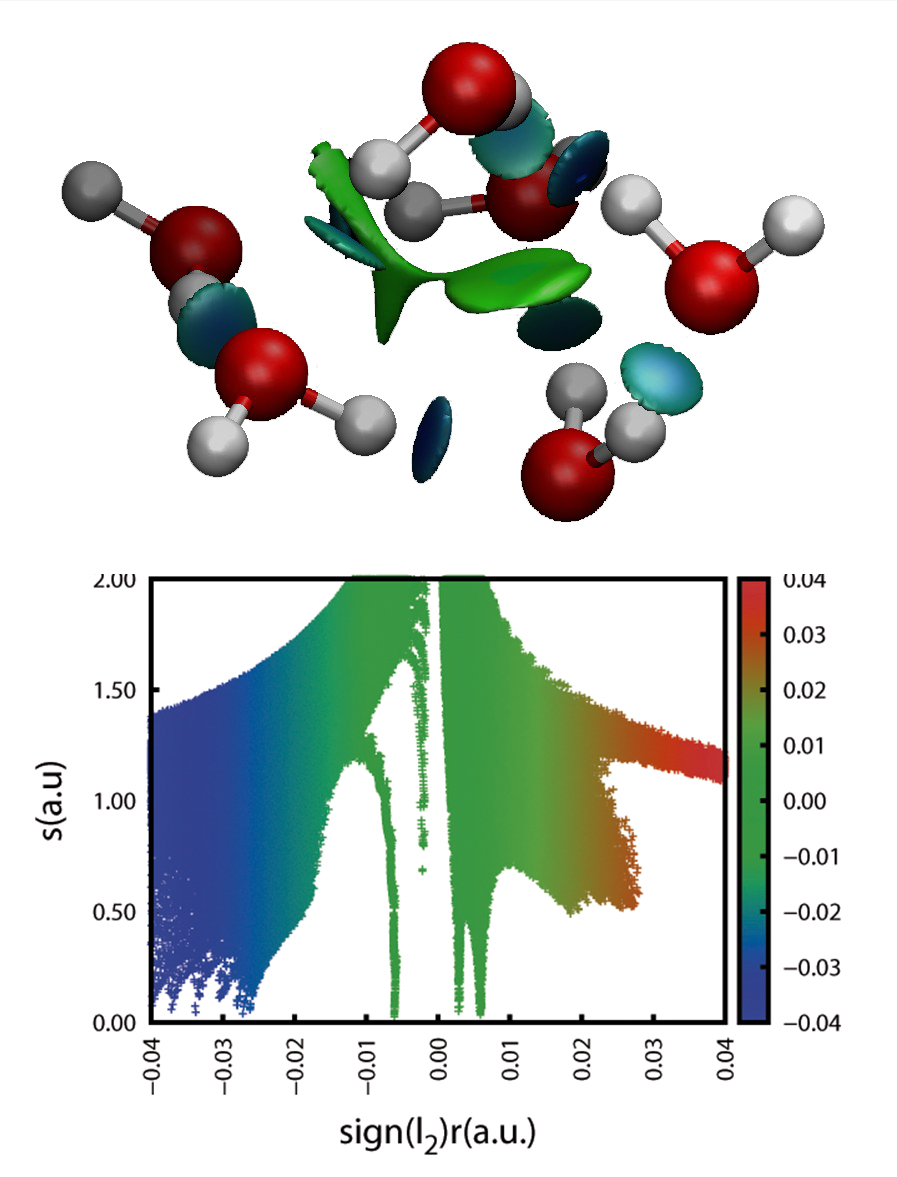
NCI representation in 3D and 2D of a six water molecules cluster

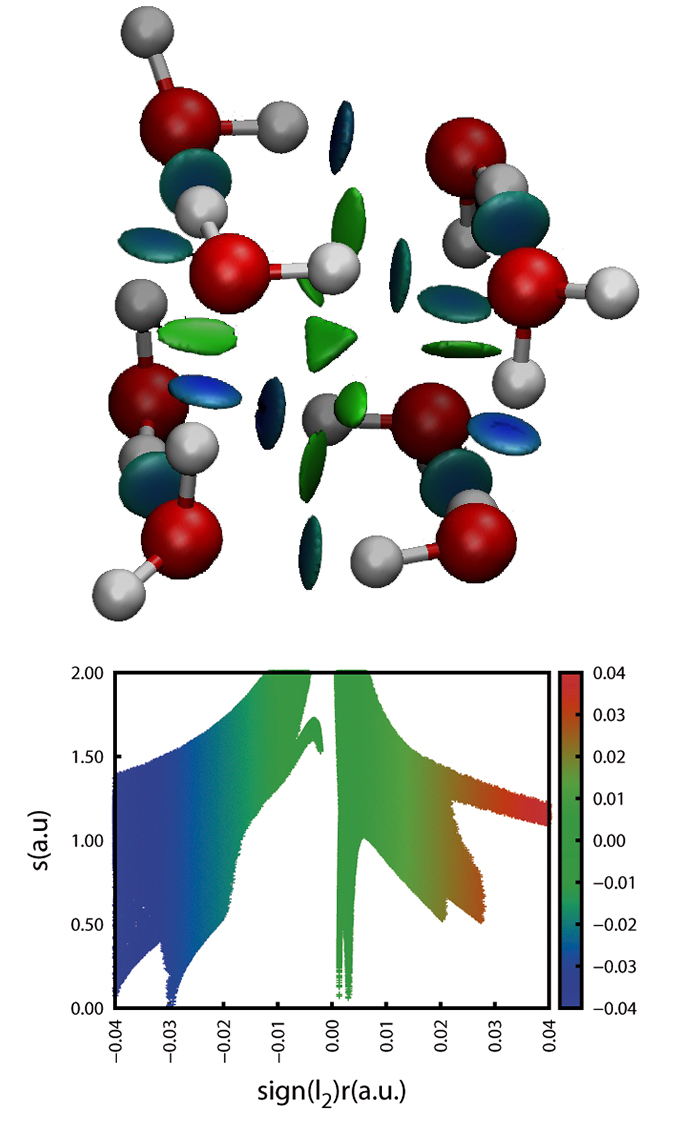
NCI representation in 3D and 2D of an eight water molecules cluster

The Non-Covalent Interactions index, commonly referred to as simply Non-Covalent Interactions (NCI) is a visualization index based in the Electron density (ρ) and the reduced density gradient (s). It is based on the empirical observation that Non-covalent interactions can be associated with the regions of small reduced density gradient at low electronic densities. In quantum chemistry, the non-covalent interactions index is used to visualize non-covalent interactions in three-dimensional space.

Its visual representation arises from the isosurfaces of the reduced density gradient colored by a scale of strength. The strength is usually estimated through the product of the electron density and the second eigenvalue (λ_{H}) of the Hessian of the electron density in each point of the isosurface, with the attractive or repulsive character being determined by the sign of λ_{H}. This allows for a direct representation and characterization of non-covalent interactions in three-dimensional space, including hydrogen bonds and steric clashes. Being based on the electron density and derived scalar fields, NCI indexes are invariant with respect to the transformation of molecular orbitals. Furthermore, the electron density of a system can be calculated both by X-ray diffraction experiments and theoretical wavefunction calculations.

The reduced density gradient (s) is a scalar field of the electron density (ρ) that can be defined as

$s(\mathbf{r}) = \frac{\left | \nabla\rho(\mathbf{r}) \right | }{2 (3\pi^2)^{1/3} \rho(\mathbf{r})^{4/3} }$

Within the Density Functional Theory framework the reduced density gradient arises in the definition of the Generalized Gradient Approximation of the exchange functional. The original definition is

$s(\mathbf{r}) = \frac{\left | \nabla\rho(\mathbf{r}) \right | }{2k_F \rho(\mathbf{r}) }$

in which k_{F} is the Fermi momentum of the free electron gas.

The NCI was developed by Canadian computational chemist Erin Johnson while she was a postdoctoral fellow at Duke University in the group of Weitao Yang.
