= Stoke Mandeville Stadium Hall of Fame =

British hall of fame for wheelchair sport

WheelPower Stoke Mandeville Hall of Fame
- Awarded for: Outstanding achievement in, or contribution to, wheelchair sport in the United Kingdom
- Location: Stoke Mandeville Stadium, Buckinghamshire
- Country: United Kingdom
- Presented by: WheelPower
- First award: 2003

The Stoke Mandeville Hall of Fame (also known as the WheelPower Stoke Mandeville Hall of Fame) is a British hall of fame recognising athletes and other people who have made an outstanding contribution to wheelchair sport in the United Kingdom. It is run by the charity WheelPower and is based at Stoke Mandeville Stadium in Buckinghamshire, England.

== History ==
The Hall of Fame was established in 2003, at the ceremony marking the reopening of the redeveloped Stoke Mandeville Stadium. WheelPower describes it as continuing a roll-of-honour tradition dating back to the origins of the Paralympic Movement at Stoke Mandeville in the 1940s. In 1948 Sir Ludwig Guttmann organised the first competition at Stoke Mandeville for 16 injured servicemen and women, the beginning of the Stoke Mandeville Games that led to the Paralympic Games.

The first inductees, including Guttmann, were inducted by the Prince of Wales in 2003. In October 2014 four further inductees were added by the Countess of Wessex, and a Hall of Fame display was unveiled at the entrance to the stadium. Later ceremonies have been held during the annual Inter Spinal Unit Games, an event at Stoke Mandeville for people who have recently sustained a spinal cord injury.

Inductees are Paralympians and sports administrators described by the organisers as having a particular connection with the stadium.

== Inductees ==
Year	Inductee	Sport / role	Ref.
2003	Sir Ludwig Guttmann KBE	Founder of the Stoke Mandeville Games	
2003	Baroness Tanni Grey-Thompson DBE	Wheelchair racing	
2003	Sir Philip Craven MBE	Wheelchair basketball; President of the International Paralympic Committee	
2003	Caz Walton OBE	Athletics, Table tennis, Wheelchair fencing; ten-time Paralympic champion (1964–1988)	
2014	David Weir CBE	Wheelchair racing	
2014	Margaret Maughan	Archery	
2014	Eva Loeffler OBE	Volunteer; involved since the 1948 Games. Former Chairman of WheelPower.	
2014	The Hon. Mark Vestey	Former President of WheelPower	
2017	Isabel Newstead MBE	Swimming, Athletics, Shooting; seven-time Paralympian	
2017	Jane Blackburn	Table tennis	
2017	Peter Norfolk OBE	Wheelchair tennis	
2017	Simon Munn MBE	Wheelchair basketball	
2018	Kevan Baker OBE	Athletics (discus); two-time Paralympic bronze medallist; Chairman of WheelPower	
2018	Ernie Guild MBE	Athletics (shot put); 1988 Paralympic champion; Vice Chairman of WheelPower	
2018	Jean Stone MBE	Administrator; recipient of the Paralympic Order	
2022	Jonathan Coggan MBE	Wheelchair rugby	
2022	Tony Sainsbury OBE	Administrator	
2022	Deanna (Di) Coates MBE	Shooting (air rifle); three-time Paralympic champion; competed at eight Paralympic Games (1984–2012)	
2024	Terry Bywater	Wheelchair basketball	
2024	Angie Malone MBE	Wheelchair curling	
