= Peter Eriksson (coach) =

- Born: 19 November 1952 (age 72)

Peter Eriksson (born 19 November 1952) is an athletics coach and formerly the head coach of the Olympic and Paralympic programs for both British Athletics and Athletics Canada. Eriksson has over 30 years of coaching experience in speed skating and track and field; and has led Canada to record medal performances in the 2016 Olympic Games, 2015 World Championships and 2014 Commonwealth Games. Under his leadership as performance director and head coach, the nations that he has worked with has generated over 240 medals at major International Competitions.

Athletes in his programs have won 124 medals at the Paralympic Games since 1984, in addition to medals won at World Championships and other major international events. Eriksson is the most successful Paralympic Track and Field coach in Paralympic history.

He has personally coached many athletes to international medals, including Jeff Adams, Kelly Smith, Scot Hollonbeck, Jamie Bone, Rainer Kuschall, Heine Koboerle, Rick Reelie, Clayton Gerein (1964–2010), Colette Bourgonje, Gavin Foulsham, Peter Carruthers (1947-2017), Christoph Etzlstorfer, Daniella Jutzeler (1967–1994), Håkan Ericsson, Bo Lindqvist, Jan-Owe Matsson, Aron Andersson, Tatyana McFadden, Chantal Petitclerc, Brent Lakatos, Hannah Cockroft, Shelly Woods. Eriksson is also a co-founder of the World Series for wheelchair racing, a series of international high calibre wheelchair racing events across the world 2003 to 2009.

He served as head coach of Britain's Paralympic team from 2009, where he led the team to a third position in the nations ranking, and then replaced Charles van Commenee as the Olympic head coach of UK Athletics in 2012. He resigned from this position in 2013, and took the CTO/head coach position for Athletics Canada’s Olympic and Paralympic program. Working with Athletics Canada, Eriksson did not just make history with record medal counts at major events he also established himself as the most medal-winning head coach of Canadian Athletics in modern history.

== Career in Sweden ==
Peter Eriksson was born in Stockholm, Sweden, the only son of Eskil (a construction worker) and Ellen (a switchboard operator). Spending the first years of his life in Södermalm, southside of Stockholm he eventually moved and grew up in Bagarmossen, a suburb of the city of Stockholm, and from an early age he was instilled with a strong work ethic from his parents.

As a young man he was interested firstly in athletics, and competed in the sport of speed skating for 17 years (1963–1980). He participated in the Sprint World Championships in 1977 and 1979 with the best performance of 10th place in the 500-metre in 1977 World Championships. During his speed skating career, he represented Södermals IK and Pollux speed skating clubs. From 1972 to 1983 he worked as a fireman (#128) on Östermalms Fire Station in Stockholm.

In 1980 Eriksson participated as an apprentice coach at the 1980 Olympic Games for the Swedish Track and Field Association. During these games Eriksson met Gusti Laurell, former Swedish national coach, who became his mentor and has influenced him throughout his coaching career. In addition to Laurell, Herman Buuts, the former national head coach of Sweden and the Netherlands, helped him with summer training during his last two active years as a speed skater. Buuts has also had a tremendous impact on Eriksson’s coaching philosophy and interest in track and field throughout his career.

Eriksson first became involved in coaching after the end of his speed skating career. He began his coaching career in Stockholm with a junior speed skating team and around 1982 moved over to coach Paralympic track and field athletes. The transition occurred while studying at Boson Sports School east of Stockholm where he met wheelchair track athlete Ronnie Schuttman, who asked Eriksson to coach him. Eriksson completed his master's degree in physical education at GIH (University of Stockholm) 1983. He taught in schools around Stockholm for a few years before starting research in the physiology on spinal cord injuries at the University of Stockholm for Professors Per-Olof Åstrand and Bjorn Ekblom until 1986. During this period Eriksson acted as the head coach for the Swedish Paralympic Team and coached several international wheelchair athletes such as Jan-Owe Matsson, Bo Lindqvist and Håkan Ericsson.

== Career in North America ==
Eriksson moved to Edmonton, Canada in September 1987 after spending a year in New York City. He continued his research at the Steadward Centre (formerly known as the Rick Hansen Centre) at the University of Alberta under professors Robert Steadward and Yagesh Bhambhani until 1992, when he moved to Ottawa, Ontario. During his research period Eriksson published more than 18 scientific research articles on his work.

Between 1988 and 1996 Eriksson acted as a head coach for the wheelchair racing athletes in track and field with CWSA (Canadian Wheelchair Sports Association), from 1996 onwards he coached primarily as a personal coach for several top Canadian and US wheelchair racing athletes.

Since arriving in North America, Eriksson has coached athletes from ten different countries; namely Australia, New Zealand, Japan, Germany, Switzerland, Austria, Great Britain, Sweden, Canada and United States. Eriksson was the first Paralympic track and field coach in Canada certified at Level 5 (NCCP) for track and field. Eriksson acted as the high performance director for Speed Skating Canada between 1992 and 1995, which led to seven medals at the 1994 Olympic Games. In 1995 Eriksson moved into working in the high technology field until 2005.

In 2005 he became the first Paralympic coach to be awarded Canadian Coach of the Year and was also inducted in the Terry Fox Hall of Fame. The same year he accepted the position of head coach for track and field for US Paralympic Committee, where he worked for a year. After this period Eriksson worked as high-performance adviser for Own the Podium (funding agency for elite sport in Canada) until January 2009, when he began work as head coach for track and field for the Paralympic program at UK Athletics.

== Career in UK ==
Eriksson was hired by UK Athletics as the head coach/performance director for the Paralympic program from March 2009 to October 2012. The mission was to change the international medal standing for the GB & NI team. At the 2008 Paralympic Games the GB & NI team finished 18th in the Nations standing, with two Gold medals (David Weir). The goal was set to improve the performance of the GB & NI team to be the top 10 nation at the 2011 IPC World Championships and to be the top 8 nation at the 2012 Paralympic Games leading up to a finish in the top 3 in 2016.

Under the leadership of Eriksson, the 2011 IPC World Championships results were better than expected where the GB & NI team finished 3rd in the overall medal standing with 12 gold medals and with 38 medals in total. The 2012 Paralympic Games in London continued to be a success where the GB & NI team once again finished 3rd with 11 Gold medals and with 29 medals in total.

Part of the success for the GB & NI team under Eriksson’s leadership has been complete integration with the Olympic program, the slogan for achieving this being 'the same, the same, the same', ensuring all funded athletes on the Paralympic program have the same opportunity, facilities, support services, training/coaching environment and expectations as their Olympic counterparts.

In October 2012, Eriksson was appointed to replace Charles van Commenee as UK Athletics Olympic head coach. It was intended that he would lead the programme until the World Championships in London 2017, but he resigned in June 2013, citing personal reasons.

== Back to North America 2013 ==
Eriksson accepted the CTO/head coach position at Athletics Canada in August 2013 located in his hometown of Ottawa, Ontario. This CTO/head coach position was inclusive of both the Paralympic and Olympic programs.

The mandate and the reason for hiring Eriksson was to improve the medal count at major events such as Paralympic and Olympic Games, IAAF and IPC World Championships, Commonwealth Games, PanAm Games etc. From 1996 to 2013, the average medal count for the Canadian track and field team has been 0–2 medals at major events.

Eriksson once again delivered above expectations on medals at major events. During his time at Athletics Canada, Eriksson did not just make history with record medal counts at major events he also established himself as the most medal-winning head coach of Canadian Athletics in modern history with the following performances:

- 2016 – Olympic Games, top-10 nation with a record of 6 medals; this was the first time Canada was ranked in top 10 at the Olympic Games in modern times; Canada ranked 35th at the 2012 Olympic Games
- 2016 – Paralympic Games, top-14 nation improved from 25th nation in 2012 Paralympic Games
- 2015 – IAAF World Championships, Record of 8 medals ranked 7th in nations ranking in the Medal table; this was the first time Canada was ranked in top 10 in World Championships since 1995. Canada ranked 21st in 2013 and 22nd in 2011 in the medal table
- 2015 – PanAm Games, record of 27 medals, 2nd in the nation ranking, compared to 4 medals in 2011
- 2014 – Commonwealth Games, Record of 17 medals, ranked 5th nation in the medal table compared to 14 medals in 2010

Eriksson left his position in December 2016. Athletics Canada's board of directors and CEO have acknowledged that Coach Eriksson had an outstanding career as head coach at Athletics Canada and that under his leadership Athletics Canada athletes received record-breaking results at numerous international and world competitions during his tenure.

2017 – 2021 Eriksson worked as high-performance advisor for Own the Podium (funding agency for elite sport in Canada).

Between 2021 – 2022 Eriksson held the position as the Director of High Performance and Strategy for all Olympic sports at the Saudi Arabia’s Olympic Training Center (SOTC) located in Riyadh, Saudi Arabia. Eriksson retired in December 2022.

== Medals ==
Paralympic medals won by athletes under Eriksson's coaching:

Year	Gold	Silver	Bronze	Total
1984	12	1	2	15
1988	9	8	9	26
1992	5	13	11	29
1996	6	7	4	17
2000	5	7	4	16
2004	5	1	2	8
2008	5	3	0	8
2012	2	1	0	3
2024	0	1	1	2
Total	49	42	33	124

Medals won by athletes under Eriksson's leadership:

Games	Sport	Total	Gold	Silver	Bronze
Olympic Winter Games	Speed Skating	7	2	4	1
Olympic Summer Games	Athletics	6	1	1	4
Paralympic Summer Games	Athletics	39	14	11	14
IAAF World Championships	Athletics	13	2	4	7
ISU World Championships	Speed Skating	30	15	7	8
IPC World Championships	Athletics	64	23	18	23
Commonwealth Games	Athletics	17	5	2	10
Pan Am Games	Athletics	27	11	7	9
Para Pan Am Games	Athletics	43	19	11	13
	Total	246	92	65	89

== Personal life ==
Eriksson married Rhonda Nishio (born 1955) in 1992 in Ottawa. He is the father of four daughters, Jaclyn (born 1994), Jennifer (born 1995), Jasmine (born 1999), Julia (born 2002).

== Coaching – Awards ==
2024 – The Order of Ikkos, United States Olympic/Paralympic Committee

2017 – Medal of Confederation – Senate of Canada

2012 – High Performance Coach of the Year – UK Coaching Awards – UK Coach

2012 – Hall of Fame – UK Coaching Awards – UK Coach

2008 – Coach of the Year – Canadian Wheelchair Sports Association (CWSA)

2008 – Coach of the Year – Athletics Canada

2008 – The Order of Ikkos, United States Olympic/Paralympic Committee

2008 – Coaching Association of Canada, Petro-Canada Coaching Excellence Award

2006 – Coaching Association of Canada, Petro-Canada Coaching Excellence Award

2005 – Coach of the Year – 32nd Annual Canadian Sport Awards; First Paralympic coach to ever receive this honor, this award is for all sports in Canada

2005 - Introduced to the Terry Fox Hall of Fame

2005 – Coach of the Year – Ontario Sport Awards

2004 – Canadian Wheelchair Sports Association (CWSA) – Coach of the Year

2004 – Coaching Association of Canada, Petro-Canada Coaching Excellence Award

2000 - Coaching Association of Canada, Wittenauer Coaching Excellence Award

1998 - Coaching Association of Canada, Wittenauer Coaching Excellence Award

1997 - Dr. Robert Jackson, Outstanding Volunteer Award, Canadian Wheelchair Sports Association

1996 - Nominated for the 3M Coaching Award. Coach of the Year

1996 - Coaching Association of Canada, Wittenauer Coaching Excellence Award

1995 - Coaching Association of Canada, Wittenauer Coaching Excellence Award

1993 - Coaching Association of Canada, Wittenauer Coaching Excellence Award

1991 - Nominated for the 3M Coaching Award. Coach of the Year

1990 - Nominated for the 25th Annual Air Canada Amateur Sport Awards. Coach of the Year.

1989 - Coach of the Year, Manitoba Wheelchair Sports Association, Winnipeg, Manitoba, Canada.

1986 - Wheelrose Person of the year, Rehabilitation Group, Sweden.

1980 - First Olympic Reserve, Winter Olympics, Lake Placid, New York.

1977 - Number 10 in the world (500m), World Speed Skating Championships, Netherlands.
