= Madelene Nordlund =

Swedish Paralympic athlete

Medal record

Paralympic athletics

Representing Sweden

Paralympic Games
Silver medal – second place	2000 Sydney	200 metres - T53
Silver medal – second place	2000 Sydney	400 metres - T53
Silver medal – second place	2004 Athens	400 metres - T53
Bronze medal – third place	2004 Athens	800 metres - T53

Madelene Nordlund is a Paralympic athlete from Sweden competing mainly in category T53 100m to 800m events.

Nordlund first competed in a Summer Paralympics in Sydney in 2000 winning two silver medals in the T53 200m and 800m. Four years later Nordlund competed at the 2004 Summer Paralympics winning a silver medal in the 400m and a bronze medal in the 800m. In Beijing in the 2008 Summer Paralympics she competed in the 1000m, 200m, 400m and 800m but could not add to her medal tally.
