= Axel D. Becke =

Canadian quantum chemist (1953–2025)

Axel Becke
- Born: June 10, 1953; Esslingen, Germany
- Died: October 23, 2025 (aged 72); Halifax, Canada
- Education: Queen's University; McMaster University
- Known for: Density functional theory Electron localization function Hybrid functional
- Awards: Killam Prize (2016); Herzberg Gold Medal (2015); Chemical Institute of Canada Medal (2015); FRS (2006); Schrödinger Medal (2000)
- Scientific career
- Fields: Computational chemistry
- Workplaces: Dalhousie University; Queen's University
- Thesis: Numerical Hartree-Fock-Slater Calculations on Diatomic Molecules (1981)
- Doctoral advisor: Donald W. L. Sprung
- Notable students: Erin Johnson

Axel Dieter Becke FRS (June 10, 1953 – October 23, 2025) was a physical chemist and Professor of Chemistry at Dalhousie University, Canada. He was a leading researcher in the application of density functional theory (DFT) to molecules.

== Early life ==
Becke was born in Esslingen, Germany and moved to Canada along with his parents and siblings at the age of 3. He attended the Sir Robert Borden High School in Ottawa. He graduated with a B.Sc. from Queen's University in 1975. He completed his M.Sc. in 1977 and Ph.D. in 1981 from McMaster University. His PhD advisor was nuclear physicist Donald W. L. Sprung.

== Academic career ==
From 1981 to 1983, Becke was a NSERC Postdoctoral Fellow at Dalhousie University. He took up his first faculty position at Queen's University in Kingston, Ontario in the 1980s. In 2006, he relocated to Dalhousie University to serve as the Killam Chair in Computational Science.

== Research ==
Density functional theory (DFT) was originally designed to describe metallic solid state systems. Becke, along with his co-researcher John Perdew, demonstrated that DFT could be an effective tool in quantum chemistry as well, where it is used to describe the structure and energetics of molecules.

== Honours and awards ==
In 2000 he was awarded the Schrödinger Medal from the World Association of Theoretically Oriented Chemists. In 2006 he was elected a Fellow of the Royal Society of London.

In 2015, Becke was awarded the Gerhard Herzberg Canada Gold Medal for Science and Engineering.

He has also received several other awards:

- Canada Council Killam Prize in the Natural Sciences (2016)
- Chemical Institute of Canada Medal (2015)
- Theoretical Chemistry Award of the American Chemical Society (2014)
- Fellow of the Royal Society of Canada (elected 2000)
- Fellow of the Royal Society of London (elected 2006)
- Killam Research Fellow, Canada Council for the Arts (2005–2007)
- Medal of the International Academy of Quantum Molecular Science (1991)
