= Lisa Franks =

Canadian Paralympic athlete

Personal information
- Nationality: Canada
- Born: 6 April 1982 (age 44) Moose Jaw, Saskatchewan
- Height: 172 cm (5 ft 8 in)
Medal record
Athletics
Paralympic Games
Gold medal – first place	2000 Sydney	200 metres - T52
Gold medal – first place	2000 Sydney	400 metres - T52
Gold medal – first place	2000 Sydney	800 metres - T52
Gold medal – first place	2000 Sydney	1500 metres - T52
Gold medal – first place	2004 Athens	200 metres - T52
Gold medal – first place	2004 Athens	400 metres - T52
Silver medal – second place	2000 Sydney	100 metres - T52

Lisa Franks (born 6 April 1982) is a Canadian paralympic athlete from competing mainly in category T52 wheelchair sprint events. Throughout her wheelchair racing career she set world records in the 100m, 200m, 400m, 800m, 1500m, 5000m, and marathon events.

== Career ==
Lisa has won six paralympic gold medals. In the 2000 Summer Paralympics she won gold medals in the 200m, 400m, 800m and 1500m and a silver medal in the 100m. In 2004 she defended her 200m and 400m titles. She was coached by Clayton Gerein who was a Paralympic medallist in wheelchair racing. The two were introduced by Gerein's wife who was Lisa's physiotherapist.

In readiness for the 2008 Summer Paralympics Lisa had taken up wheelchair basketball and was a part of the Canadian team that finished fifth.

== Personal life ==
On April 18, 1996, just after Frank's fourteenth birthday, she woke up in the middle of the night unable to move her legs. By the end of that day she had lost function of her arms as well, though she regained use of those after rehabilitation. Franks was diagnosed with arteriovenous malformation, a condition that caused clusters of blood vessels to prevent blood from properly passing by her spinal cord.

She graduated from the University of Saskatchewan in 2006 with a Bachelor of Engineering and a focus in mechanical engineering.

She was awarded an Honorary Doctorate from the University of Regina in 2009. and appointed as an Honorary Colonel in the Royal Canadian Air Force in 2019.

She currently lives in a campervan and documents her Vanlife and surfing adventures on her YouTube channel Keepinitwheel306.
