= Miki Yoda =

Japanese Paralympic athlete

Medal record

Paralympic athletics

Representing Japan

Paralympic Games
Bronze medal – third place	2000 Sydney	200 metres - T52
Bronze medal – third place	2000 Sydney	400 metres - T52

Miki Yoda (要田 美紀, Yōda Miki) is a paralympic athlete from Japan competing mainly in category T52 sprint events.

Miki competed in both the 2000 and 2004 Summer Paralympics. In the 2000 event she competed in the 800m and won bronze medals in both the 200m and 400m, in both events losing to gold medalist Lisa Franks. In the 2004 games she again competed in the 200m and 400m but was unable to medal in either.
