= Marco Matassa =

Italian engineer

- Citizenship: Italian
- Education: University of Modena and Reggio Emilia
- Occupation: Engineer
- Employer: Racing Bulls
- Title: Chief Engineer

Marco Matassa is an Italian Formula One engineer. He is the chief engineer Racing Bulls Formula One team.

== Career ==
Matassa graduated in engineering from the University of Modena and Reggio Emilia. He joined Scuderia Toro Rosso directly after completing his studies, initially working in data and performance analysis before progressing to become performance engineer to Sébastien Buemi for the 2010 Formula One season. He continued in that role with the Swiss driver in 2011, before moving to work with Daniel Ricciardo in 2012. The following season Matassa was promoted to Ricciardo’s race engineer, taking on full responsibility for trackside engineering operations, and in 2014 he held the same role for rookie Daniil Kvyat. In 2015 he was paired with another debutant, Carlos Sainz Jr., engineering the Spaniard through his formative years with the Faenza-based team until Sainz’s departure for Renault late in 2017. Matassa then completed the remainder of the 2017 season working with rookie Pierre Gasly.

In 2018 Matassa joined Ferrari Driver Academy, becoming its team principal. In this role he was responsible for the management, training, and competitive programmes of Ferrari’s junior drivers across multiple categories, helping to oversee the progression of young talents within Ferrari’s development pipeline. He held the position until 2024, when he returned to Faenza to rejoin the organisation - by then competing as Racing Bulls - in a senior technical role within the team’s Formula One programme.
