= Pia Schmid =

Swiss Paralympic athlete

Medal record

Track and field (T52)

Representing Switzerland

Paralympic Games
Silver medal – second place	2004 Athens	200m - T52
Bronze medal – third place	2008 Beijing	200m - T52

Pia Schmid is a Paralympian athlete from Switzerland competing mainly in category T52 sprint events.

She competed in the 1996 Summer Paralympics in Atlanta, United States. There she finished seventh in the women's 200 metres - T51 event, finished seventh in the women's 400 metres - T51 event and finished seventh in the women's 800 metres - T51 event. She also competed at the 2000 Summer Paralympics in Sydney, Australia. There she finished fifth in the women's 100 metres - T52 event, finished eighth in the women's 200 metres - T52 event, finished eighth in the women's 400 metres - T52 event and finished eighth in the women's 800 metres - T52 event. She also competed at the 2004 Summer Paralympics in Athens, Greece. There she won a silver medal in the women's 200 metres - T52 event and finished fourth in the 400 metres. She also competed in Beijing, China winning a bronze medal in the women's 200 metres - T52 event and finished fourth in the women's 100 metres - T52 event.
