= Erin Johnson =

Canadian computational chemist

- Born: Ottawa
- Education: Carleton University; Queen's University
- Awards: Steacie Prize; Rutherford Memorial Medal; CIC Tom Ziegler Award; WATOC Dirac Medal (2018)
- Scientific career
- Workplaces: Duke University; University of California, Merced; Dalhousie University
- Thesis: A density-functional theory including dispersion interactions (2007)
- Doctoral advisor: Axel D. Becke
- Website: https://erin-r-johnson.github.io

Erin Johnson is a Canadian computational chemist. She holds the Herzberg–Becke Chair at Dalhousie University. She works on density functional theory and intermolecular interactions.

== Education and early career ==
Johnson is from Ottawa, Canada. She completed her B.Sc. Hons. in Integrated Science (chemistry/mathematics) at Carleton University in 2004. She earned her PhD at Queen's University in 2007, working with Axel D. Becke. In 2006, they demonstrated a simple potential for exchange energies; the Becke–Johnson potential. She developed the exchange-hole dipole moment dispersion model (XDM), which describes intermolecular interactions. The model is a density functional model based on second-order perturbation theory, and uses the interaction of induced dipoles to model dispersion. Her PhD focussed on improving the accuracy and efficiency of computational chemistry. She was a Natural Sciences and Engineering Research Council postdoctoral fellow at Duke University with Yang Weitao from 2007 to 2010. They developed fractional spin density functional theory to describe open-shell singlet diradicals. She looked at the energy splitting between spin-states, connecting them to the ionisation potential and electron affinity.

A major contribution of her postdoctoral research was the development of the non-covalent interaction index. This index describes the non-covalent interactions in a range of chemical applications, and is fast to compute, making it able to handle large systems. The non-covalent interaction index can be plotted in real space, which allows the inter- and intra-molecular interactions present in the system to be visualised.

== Independent academic career ==
Johnson joined the faculty of the School of Natural Sciences at the University of California, Merced as an assistant professor in 2010. In February 2015, she relocated to the Department of Chemistry at Dalhousie University as the Herzberg–Becke Chair in Theoretical Chemistry. She was promoted to Full Professor at Dalhousie in 2018.

== Research ==
In her independent career, Johnson has continued to develop and apply methods for London dispersion interactions using density functional theory. These applications include molecular crystals, organometallic complexes, and layered solids.

Johnson has applied her dispersion-corrected density functional theory methods to crystal structure prediction. Her group successfully predicted the most stable polymorph of a variety of molecular crystals using dispersion-corrected density functional theory. She has worked on charge-transfer complexes and how charge is transferred between electron donors (such as NH_{3}, C_{2}H_{4}) and electron acceptors (F_{2}, Cl_{2}). She studied 2D electrides, alkalides and transition-metal diatomics. In 2017, she collaborated with Kim Jelfs to predict the relative stabilities of polymorphs of aza-6-helicene from first principles.

== Published work ==
As of 2023, she has authored more than 100 peer-reviewed articles, which have been cited more than 24,000 times. She published the book Density Functionals with Springer in 2015.

== Awards ==
- 2021 Steacie Prize
- 2020 Rutherford Memorial Medal in Chemistry
- 2019 NSERC E.W.R. Steacie Memorial Fellowship
- 2018 Dirac Medal of the World Association of Theoretical and Computational Chemists
- 2018 Chemical Institute of Canada Tom Ziegler Award
- 2017 Dalhousie University Faculty of Science Killam Prize
- 2006 NSERC André Hamer Postgraduate Prize
- 2004 Carleton University Governor General's Medal – Undergraduate Level
