= Mexico at the 2004 Summer Paralympics =

- IPC code: MEX
- NPC: Federacion Mexicana de Deporte

in Athens
- Competitors: 77 in 6 sports
- Medals Ranked 15th: Gold 14 Silver 10 Bronze 10 Total 34

Summer Paralympics appearances (overview)
- 1972; 1976; 1980; 1984; 1988; 1992; 1996; 2000; 2004; 2008; 2012; 2016; 2020; 2024

Mexico sent a delegation to compete at the 2004 Summer Paralympics in Athens.

== Medallists ==
| Medal | Name | Sport | Event |
|---|---|---|---|
| Gold | Salvador Hernandez | Athletics | Men's 100m T52 |
| Gold | Edgar Navarro | Athletics | Men's 200m T51 |
| Gold | Saúl Mendoza | Athletics | Men's 1500m T54 |
| Gold | Mauro Maximo de Jesus | Athletics | Men's shot put F53 |
| Gold | Luis Zepeda | Athletics | Men's javelin throw F54 |
| Gold | Maria Salas | Athletics | Women's shot put F32-34/52/53 |
| Gold | Esther Rivera | Athletics | Women's javelin throw F33/34/52/53 |
| Gold | Jose Arnulfo Castorena | Swimming | Men's 50m breaststroke SB2 |
| Gold | Juan Ignacio Reyes | Swimming | Men's 50m backstroke S4 |
| Gold | Patricia Valle | Swimming | Women's 50m freestyle S3 |
| Gold | Doramitzi Gonzalez | Swimming | Women's 50m freestyle S6 |
| Gold | Patricia Valle | Swimming | Women's 100m freestyle S3 |
| Gold | Doramitzi Gonzalez | Swimming | Women's 100m freestyle S6 |
| Gold | Doramitzi Gonzalez | Swimming | Women's 400m freestyle S6 |
| Silver | Salvador Hernandez | Athletics | Men's 200m T52 |
| Silver | Aaron Gordian | Athletics | Men's 5000m T54 |
| Silver | Adrian Paz Velazquez | Athletics | Men's javelin throw F52/53 |
| Silver | Lucia Sosa | Athletics | Women's 400m T52 |
| Silver | Perla Bustamante | Athletics | Women's shot put F42-46 |
| Silver | Maria Salas | Athletics | Women's javelin throw F33/34/52/53 |
| Silver | Amalia Perez Vazquez | Powerlifting | Women's 48 kg |
| Silver | Jose Arnulfo Castorena | Swimming | Men's 150m individual medley SM3 |
| Silver | Patricia Valle | Swimming | Women's 50m butterfly S4 |
| Silver | Doramitzi Gonzalez | Swimming | Women's 50m butterfly S6 |
| Bronze | Edgar Navarro | Athletics | Men's marathon T51 |
| Bronze | Letícia Torres | Athletics | Women's 200m T52 |
| Bronze | Letícia Torres | Athletics | Women's 400m T52 |
| Bronze | Perla Bustamante | Athletics | Women's long jump F42 |
| Bronze | Laura Cerero Gabriel | Powerlifting | Women's 40 kg |
| Bronze | Catalina Diaz Vilchis | Powerlifting | Women's 67.5 kg |
| Bronze | Jose Arnulfo Castorena | Swimming | Men's 50m butterfly S4 |
| Bronze | Pedro Rangel | Swimming | Men's 100m breaststroke SB5 |
| Bronze | Juan Ignacio Reyes | Swimming | Men's 150m individual medley SM3 |
| Bronze | Doramitzi Gonzalez | Swimming | Women's 100m backstroke S6 |

== Sports ==
=== Archery ===
| Athlete | Event | Ranking round | | Round of 32 | Round of 16 | Quarterfinals | Semifinals | Finals | |
| Athlete | Event | Score | Seed | Opposition score | Opposition score | Opposition score | Opposition score | Opposition score | Rank |
|---|---|---|---|---|---|---|---|---|---|
| Jose Antonio Baet Tellez | Men's individual W2 | 564 | 26 | N/A | Lee (KOR); L 146-157 | did not advance | | | |

=== Athletics ===
==== Men's track ====
| Athlete | Class | Event | Heats | | Semifinal | | Final | |
| Athlete | Class | Event | Result | Rank | Result | Rank | Result | Rank |
|---|---|---|---|---|---|---|---|---|
| Pedro Acosta | T11 | 10000m | N/A | | | | 36:06.13 | 9 |
| Pedro Acosta | T11 | Marathon | N/A | | | | DNF | |
| Gilberto Alavez | T44 | 100m | 12.57 | 8 Q | N/A | | 12.58 | 8 |
| Gilberto Alavez | T44 | 400m | 58.70 | 9 | did not advance | | | |
| Moisée Beristáin | T12 | 5000m | N/A | | | | 15:41.72 | 7 |
| Moisée Beristáin | T13 | 10000m | N/A | | | | 33:10.22 | 7 |
| Moisée Beristáin | T13 | Marathon | N/A | | | | 2:44:24 | 5 |
| Clemente Esquivel | T11 | 10000m | N/A | | | | 37:05.11 | 11 |
| Clemente Esquivel | T11 | Marathon | N/A | | | | 3:20:23 | 8 |
| Aaron Gordian | T54 | 1500m | 3:05.47 | 13 Q | 3:08.98 | 10 Q | 3:06.17 | 8 |
| Aaron Gordian | T54 | 5000m | 10:25.61 | 6 q | N/A | | 10:24.38 | 2nd place, silver medalist(s) |
| Aaron Gordian | T54 | 10000m | 21:48.34 | 11 Q | N/A | | 20:53.59 | 5 |
| Aaron Gordian | T54 | Marathon | N/A | | | | 1:31:03 | 4 |
| Salvador Hernandez | T52 | 100m | N/A | | | | 17.21 | 1st place, gold medalist(s) |
| Salvador Hernandez | T52 | 200m | 32.31 | 1 Q | N/A | | 31.46 | 2nd place, silver medalist(s) |
| Luis Enrique Herrera | T12 | 5000m | N/A | | | | 15:47.69 | 8 |
| Luis Enrique Herrera | T13 | 1500m | 4:05.53 | 12 q | N/A | | 4:04.79 | 7 |
| Nicolas Ledezma | T11 | 5000m | N/A | | | | 16:44.37 | 9 |
| Nicolas Ledezma | T11 | 10000m | N/A | | | | 35:42.03 | 7 |
| Nicolas Ledezma | T11 | Marathon | N/A | | | | DNF | |
| Saúl Mendoza | T54 | 800m | 1:37.95 | 8 Q | N/A | | 1:32.80 | 5 |
| Saúl Mendoza | T54 | 1500m | 3:00.64 | 4 Q | 3:04.52 | 1 Q | 3:04.88 | 1st place, gold medalist(s) |
| Saúl Mendoza | T54 | 5000m | 10:29.62 | 10 Q | N/A | | 10:26.76 | 12 |
| Pedro Meza | T46 | 1500m | N/A | | | | 4:08.26 | 8 |
| Pedro Meza | T46 | 5000m | N/A | | | | 15:37.84 | 10 |
| German Nava | T13 | 5000m | N/A | | | | 16:31.64 | 7 |
| German Nava | T13 | 10000m | N/A | | | | 35:54.51 | 15 |
| Edgar Navarro | T51 | 200m | N/A | | | | 39.70 WR | 1st place, gold medalist(s) |
| Edgar Navarro | T51 | Marathon | N/A | | | | 3:13.42 | 3rd place, bronze medalist(s) |
| Daniel Ramirez | T13 | 5000m | N/A | | | | 16:13.19 | 6 |
| Daniel Ramirez | T13 | 10000m | N/A | | | | 33:11.79 | 8 |
| Daniel Ramirez | T13 | Marathon | N/A | | | | 2:44:23 | 4 |
| Jaime Ramirez | T53 | 100m | 15.95 | 10 | did not advance | | | |
| Jaime Ramirez | T53 | 200m | 28.35 | 15 | did not advance | | | |
| Fernando Sanchez | T54 | 100m | 15.01 | 12 q | 15.13 | 12 | did not advance | |
| Fernando Sanchez | T54 | 200m | 26.02 | 9 | did not advance | | | |
| Freddy Sandoval | T54 | 100m | 15.55 | 24 | did not advance | | | |
| Freddy Sandoval | T54 | 200m | 27.00 | 12 | did not advance | | | |
| Gonzalo Valdovinos | T54 | 100m | 14.88 | 8 q | 14.97 | 8 Q | 14.80 | 5 |
| Gonzalo Valdovinos | T54 | 200m | 26.60 | 11 | did not advance | | | |
| Martin Velasco Soria | T54 | 800m | 1:36.76 | 12 | did not advance | | | |
| Martin Velasco Soria | T54 | 1500m | 3:08.73 | 25 | did not advance | | | |
| Martin Velasco Soria | T54 | 5000m | 10:26.05 | 14 | did not advance | | | |
| Martin Velasco Soria | T54 | 10000m | 21:10.88 | 13 | did not advance | | | |
| Martin Velasco Soria | T54 | Marathon | N/A | | | | 1:41:00 | 17 |
| Santiago Velazquez | T52 | 100m | N/A | | | | 22.08 | 9 |
| Gilberto Alavez; Ruben Fuentes; Pedro Meza | T42-46 | 4 × 100 m relay | DNS | | | | | |
| Jaime Ramirez; Fernando Sanchez; Freddy Sandoval; Gonzalo Valdovinos | T53-54 | 4 × 100 m relay | 55.30 | 7 | did not advance | | | |
| Jaime Ramirez; Fernando Sanchez; Freddy Sandoval; Gonzalo Valdovinos | T53-54 | 4 × 400 m relay | 3:18.52 | 4 q | N/A | | 3:18.54 | 4 |

==== Men's field ====
| Athlete | Class | Event | Final | | |
| Athlete | Class | Event | Result | Points | Rank |
|---|---|---|---|---|---|
| Ruben Fuentes | F42 | Long jump | 4.23 | - | 6 |
| Daniel Jimenez | F11 | Javelin | NMR | | |
| Mauro Maximo de Jesus | F52-53 | Javelin | 19.46 | 1016 | 4 |
| Mauro Maximo de Jesus | F53 | Discus | 14.75 | - | 12 |
| Mauro Maximo de Jesus | F53 | Shot put | 8.53 WR | - | 1st place, gold medalist(s) |
| Luis Zepeda | F54 | Discus | 20.92 | - | 10 |
| Luis Zepeda | F54 | Javelin | 26.89 WR | - | 1st place, gold medalist(s) |
| Luis Zepeda | F54 | Shot put | 7.81 | - | 8 |
| Adrian Paz Velazquez | F52-53 | Javelin | 19.78 WR | 1033 | 2nd place, silver medalist(s) |

==== Women's track ====
| Athlete | Class | Event | Heats | | Semifinal | | Final | |
| Athlete | Class | Event | Result | Rank | Result | Rank | Result | Rank |
|---|---|---|---|---|---|---|---|---|
| Yazmith Bataz | T54 | 100m | 18.78 | 9 | did not advance | | | |
| Yazmith Bataz | T54 | 200m | 33.77 | 13 | did not advance | | | |
| Araidne Hernández | T54 | 800m | 1:55.24 | 10 | did not advance | | | |
| Araidne Hernández | T54 | 1500m | 3:36.99 | 6 q | N/A | | 3:30.13 | 9 |
| Araidne Hernández | T54 | 5000m | DNF | q | N/A | | 12:03.42 | 5 |
| Araidne Hernández | T54 | Marathon | N/A | | | | 2:14:29 | 13 |
| Julia Palacios | T13 | 400m | N/A | | | | 1:06.74 | 7 |
| Ivonne Reyes | T54 | 800m | 2:05.52 | 16 | did not advance | | | |
| Ivonne Reyes | T54 | 5000m | 12:54.07 | 7 Q | N/A | | 12:51.67 | 11 |
| Ivonne Reyes | T54 | Marathon | N/A | | | | 2:06:17 | 8 |
| Lucia Sosa | T52 | 200m | 43.73 | 9 | did not advance | | | |
| Lucia Sosa | T52 | 400m | 1:21.37 | 2 Q | N/A | | 1:20.79 | 2nd place, silver medalist(s) |
| Leticia Torres | T52 | 200m | 41.93 | 4 Q | N/A | | 41.49 | 3rd place, bronze medalist(s) |
| Leticia Torres | T52 | 400m | 1:24.57 | 5 Q | N/A | | 1:22.27 | 3rd place, bronze medalist(s) |

==== Women's field ====
| Athlete | Class | Event | Final | | |
| Athlete | Class | Event | Result | Points | Rank |
|---|---|---|---|---|---|
| Leticia Aleman | F56-58 | Shot put | 6.30 | 883 | 13 |
| Perla Bustamante | F42 | Long jump | 3.44 | - | 3rd place, bronze medalist(s) |
| Perla Bustamante | F42-46 | Shot put | 8.87 | 1185 | 2nd place, silver medalist(s) |
| Araceli Castro | F56-58 | Javelin | 25.29 | 1012 | 4 |
| Araceli Castro | F56-58 | Shot put | 7.78 | 850 | 14 |
| Maribel Galindo | F56-58 | Javelin | 7.41 | 317 | 15 |
| Dora Garcia | F54/55 | Discus | 11.64 | 771 | 11 |
| Dora Garcia | F54/55 | Javelin | 10.70 | 830 | 7 |
| Dora Garcia | F54/55 | Shot put | 5.36 | 881 | 7 |
| Leticia Ochoa | F32-34/51-53 | Discus | 8.37 | 605 | 11 |
| Leticia Ochoa | F32-34/52/53 | Shot put | 2.79 | 811 | 11 |
| Esther Rivera | F33/34/52/53 | Javelin | 11.08 WR | 1543 | 1st place, gold medalist(s) |
| Catalina Rosales | F56-58 | Discus | 26.08 | 840 | 14 |
| Catalina Rosales | F56-58 | Javelin | DNS | | |
| Catalina Rosales | F56-58 | Shot put | 10.04 | 1097 | 5 |
| Maria Salas | F32-34/51-53 | Discus | 11.36 | 821 | 8 |
| Maria Salas | F32-34/52/53 | Shot put | 4.59 | 1334 WR | 1st place, gold medalist(s) |
| Maria Salas | F33/34/52/53 | Javelin | 10.79 | 1502 | 2nd place, silver medalist(s) |
| Veronica Saucedo | F56-58 | Discus | 14.90 | 698 | 16 |
| Leticia Torres | F54/55 | Discus | 14.54 | 963 | 6 |

=== Powerlifting ===
==== Men ====
| Athlete | Event | Result | Rank |
|---|---|---|---|
| Porfirio Arredondo | 67.5kg | NMR | |
| Francisco Ramirez | 82.5kg | NMR | |

==== Women ====
| Athlete | Event | Result | Rank |
|---|---|---|---|
| Miriam Aguilar | 44kg | 70.0 | 6 |
| Perla Barcenas Ponce de Leon | 75kg | NMR | |
| Laura Cerero Gabriel | 40kg | 85.0 | 3rd place, bronze medalist(s) |
| Catalina Diaz Vilchis | 67.5kg | 110.0 | 3rd place, bronze medalist(s) |
| Dora Nelly Lopez Hilerio | 82.5kg | 95.0 | 5 |
| Amalia Perez Vazquez | 48kg | 110.0 | 2nd place, silver medalist(s) |

=== Swimming ===
==== Men ====
| Athlete | Class | Event | Heats | | Final | |
| Athlete | Class | Event | Result | Rank | Result | Rank |
|---|---|---|---|---|---|---|
| Jose Arnulfo Castorena | S4 | 50m freestyle | 47.72 | 10 | did not advance | |
| Jose Arnulfo Castorena | S4 | 100m freestyle | 1:44.19 | 8 Q | 1:43.09 | 8 |
| Jose Arnulfo Castorena | S4 | 200m freestyle | 3:40.70 | 8 Q | 3:42.06 | 8 |
| Jose Arnulfo Castorena | S4 | 50m butterfly | 53.85 | 4 Q | 53.01 | 3rd place, bronze medalist(s) |
| Jose Arnulfo Castorena | SB2 | 50m breaststroke | 1:01.41 | 1 Q | 56.27 WR | 1st place, gold medalist(s) |
| Jose Arnulfo Castorena | SM3 | 150m individual medley | 3:12.39 | 2 Q | 3:04.16 | 2nd place, silver medalist(s) |
| Vidal Dominguez | S5 | 50m butterfly | 44.15 | 6 Q | 46.53 | 7 |
| Vidal Dominguez | SB4 | 100m breaststroke | 2:00.86 | 8 Q | 2:02.75 | 8 |
| Vidal Dominguez | SM5 | 200m individual medley | 3:49.80 | 8 Q | 3:47.98 | 7 |
| Vladimir Martinez | S11 | 100m butterfly | 1:23.48 | 7 Q | 1:24.23 | 7 |
| Vladimir Martinez | SM11 | 200m individual medley | N/A | | 3:03.60 | 7 |
| Emilio Montiel | SB3 | 50m breaststroke | 57.53 | 5 Q | 56.91 | 5 |
| Pedro Rangel | SB5 | 100m breaststroke | 1:42.91 | 7 Q | 1:36.31 | 3rd place, bronze medalist(s) |
| Juan Ignacio Reyes | S4 | 50m freestyle | 45.82 | 9 | did not advance | |
| Juan Ignacio Reyes | S4 | 100m freestyle | 1:34.70 | 6 Q | 1:37.04 | 6 |
| Juan Ignacio Reyes | S4 | 200m freestyle | 3:23.05 | 5 Q | 3:26.96 | 6 |
| Juan Ignacio Reyes | S4 | 50m backstroke | 46.18 PR | 1 Q | 45.73 WR | 1st place, gold medalist(s) |
| Juan Ignacio Reyes | S4 | 50m butterfly | 48.29 | 3 Q | DSQ | |
| Juan Ignacio Reyes | SM3 | 150m individual medley | 3:19.42 | 4 Q | 3:07.92 | 3rd place, bronze medalist(s) |
| Cristopher Tronco | S3 | 50m freestyle | 1:06.01 | 12 | did not advance | |
| Cristopher Tronco | S3 | 100m freestyle | 2:18.43 | 11 | did not advance | |
| Cristopher Tronco | S3 | 200m freestyle | 4:50.28 | 11 | did not advance | |
| Cristopher Tronco | SB2 | 50m breaststroke | 1:06.26 | 4 Q | 1:07.55 | 5 |
| Cristopher Tronco | SM3 | 150m individual medley | 3:35.61 | 6 Q | 3:34.21 | 7 |
| Jose Arnulfo Castorena; Vidal Dominguez; Pedro Rangel; Juan Ignacio Reyes | N/A | 4x50m freestyle relay (20pts) | 2:57.06 | 8 Q | 3:07.29 | 8 |
| Vidal Dominguez; Emilio Montiel; Pedro Rangel; Juan Ignacio Reyes | N/A | 4x50m medley relay (20pts) | DSQ | | did not advance | |

==== Women ====
| Athlete | Class | Event | Heats | | Final | |
| Athlete | Class | Event | Result | Rank | Result | Rank |
|---|---|---|---|---|---|---|
| Velia Flores | S7 | 400m freestyle | 6:33.54 | 10 | did not advance | |
| Velia Flores | SB6 | 100m breaststroke | 2:08.62 | 10 | did not advance | |
| Doramitzi Gonzalez | S6 | 50m freestyle | 38.51 | 2 Q | 36.14 | 1st place, gold medalist(s) |
| Doramitzi Gonzalez | S6 | 100m freestyle | 1:21.57 | 1 Q | 1:17.43 WR | 1st place, gold medalist(s) |
| Doramitzi Gonzalez | S6 | 400m freestyle | 6:14.40 | 3 Q | 5:49.18 WR | 1st place, gold medalist(s) |
| Doramitzi Gonzalez | S6 | 100m backstroke | 1:34.58 | 2 Q | 1:34.47 | 3rd place, bronze medalist(s) |
| Doramitzi Gonzalez | S6 | 50m butterfly | 44.55 | 6 Q | 41.03 | 2nd place, silver medalist(s) |
| Doramitzi Gonzalez | SM6 | 200m individual medley | 3:37.77 | 7 Q | 3:37.14 | 8 |
| Virginia Hernandez | S2 | 50m freestyle | N/A | | 1:40.76 | 5 |
| Virginia Hernandez | S2 | 100m freestyle | N/A | | 3:28.81 | 5 |
| Virginia Hernandez | S2 | 50m backstroke | N/A | | 1:42.56 | 5 |
| Patricia Valle | S3 | 50m freestyle | 1:01.17 | 1 Q | 58.16 WR | 1st place, gold medalist(s) |
| Patricia Valle | S3 | 100m freestyle | 2:07.78 | 1 Q | 2:08.09 | 1st place, gold medalist(s) |
| Patricia Valle | S3 | 50m backstroke | N/A | | 1:19.85 | 6 |
| Patricia Valle | S4 | 200m freestyle | 4:25.15 | 7 Q | 4:25.69 | 7 |
| Patricia Valle | S4 | 50m butterfly | N/A | | 58.84 | 2nd place, silver medalist(s) |
| Patricia Valle | SB3 | 50m breaststroke | 1:08.09 | 4 Q | 1:08.14 | 4 |
| Patricia Valle | SM4 | 150m individual medley | 3:47.24 | 8 | 3:42.48 | 7 |
| Velia Flores; Virginia Hernandez; Doramitzi Gonzalez; Patricia Valle | N/A | 4x50m freestyle relay (20pts) | N/A | | 4:07.09 | 7 |
| Velia Flores; Virginia Hernandez; Doramitzi Gonzalez; Patricia Valle | N/A | 4x50m medley relay (20pts) | N/A | | DSQ | |

=== Table tennis ===
==== Men ====
| Athlete | Event | Preliminaries | | | | Quarterfinals | Semifinals | Final / BM | |
| Athlete | Event | Opposition Result | Opposition Result | Opposition Result | Rank | Opposition Result | Opposition Result | Opposition Result | Rank |
|---|---|---|---|---|---|---|---|---|---|
| Mario Pazaran | Men's singles 5 | Kim (KOR); L 0–3 | Djurasinovic (SCG); L 0–3 | Hoegstedt (SWE); W 3–1 | 3 | did not advance | | | |
| Jose Luis Vivanco | Men's singles 10 | de la Bourdonnaye (FRA); L 0-3 | Vrbka (CZE); L 0-3 | Khalil (JOR); W 3-0 | 3 | did not advance | | | |

==== Women ====
| Athlete | Event | Preliminaries | | | | Quarterfinals | Semifinals | Final / BM | |
| Athlete | Event | Opposition Result | Opposition Result | Opposition Result | Rank | Opposition Result | Opposition Result | Opposition Result | Rank |
|---|---|---|---|---|---|---|---|---|---|
| Marie Teresa Arenales | Women's singles 4 | Zorzetto (ITA); L 1-3 | Dolinar (SLO); L 2-3 | Johnson (USA); W 3-0 | 3 | did not advance | | | |
| Isabel Garcia Ble | Women's singles 1-2 | Marziou (FRA); L 0–3 | Podda (ITA); L 0–3 | Riding (GBR); L 0–3 | 4 | did not advance | | | |
| Cristina Hoffmann | Women's singles 5 | Pivarciova (CZE); L 0-3 | Bessho (JPN); W 3-2 | Gu (CHN); W 3-2 | 2 Q | Wei (TPE); L 1-3 | did not advance | | |
| Marie Teresa Arenales; Isabel Garcia Ble; Cristina Hoffmann | Women's team 4-5 | Slovakia (SVK); L 1-3 | Italy (ITA); W 3-0 | N/A | 2 Q | France (FRA); L 1-3 | did not advance | | |

=== Wheelchair basketball ===
The women's basketball team didn't win any medals: they were 6th out 8 teams.

==== Players ====
- Rosa Elizabeth Camara Arango
- Yolanda Calderon Duran
- Rosa Elizabeth Vera Gallardo
- Wendy Garcia Amador
- Rubicela Guzman Acosta
- Lupita Madrigal Cruz
- Maria Montano Mejia
- Leticia Penaloza Serrano
- Romy Rodriguez Velaquez
- Rocio Dolores Torres Lopez
- Lucia Vazquez Delgadillo
- Cecilia Vazquez Suarez

Coach

- Aarón Dávila García

==== Results ====
| Game | Match | Score | Rank |
| 1 | Mexico vs. Canada (CAN) | 34 – 63 | 4 |
| 2 | Mexico vs. Germany (GER) | 38 – 57 | 4 |
| 3 | Mexico vs. Japan (JPN) | 29 – 45 | 4 |
| Semifinals | Mexico vs. Great Britain (GBR) | 40 – 29 | W |
| 5th-6th classification | Mexico vs. Japan (JPN) | 47 – 53 | 6 |

== See also ==
- 2004 Summer Paralympics
- Mexico at the 2004 Summer Olympics
