= WheelPower =

UK wheelchair sports organisation

WheelPower is the national organisation for wheelchair sports in the United Kingdom, and aims to help people with disabilities improve their quality of life. Formally named the British Wheelchair Sports Foundation, it is a registered charity and is based at Stoke Mandeville Stadium in Buckinghamshire.

The charity's royal patron is Sophie, Duchess of Edinburgh, who succeeded King Charles III in that role in 2024. Its other patrons include Baroness Tanni Grey-Thompson and Ade Adepitan. The charity is chaired by Rob Wilson.

== History ==
WheelPower originally formed in 1972 (54 years ago) as the British Paraplegic Sports Society.

The organisation was founded by the late Professor Sir Ludwig Guttmann, who revolutionised the treatment of people with spinal cord injury at Stoke Mandeville Hospital in the late 1940s. Guttmann began using sport as a vital part of the rehabilitation of Second World War veterans and in 1948 he set up a competition between sports clubs and other hospitals to coincide with the London Olympic Games.

From those early days a worldwide sports movement has developed for not only those with spinal injuries but also many other different types of disability.

In 1952 competitors from the Netherlands took part in the competition, giving an international notion to the movement.

In 1960, the Olympics were held in Rome, and Guttmann brought 400 wheelchair athletes to the Olympic city to compete. Although officially called the 9th Annual International Stoke Mandeville Games, the Paralympics were born. The first Winter Paralympics were held in Örnsköldsvik, Sweden in 1976.

Since 1988, the Summer Paralympics have been held in the conjunction with the Olympic Games in the same host city and this practice was adopted in 1992 for the Winter Paralympics.

The name Paralympics derives from the Greek "para" ("beside" or "alongside") and thus refers to a competition held in parallel with the Olympic Games. No relation with paralysis or paraplegia was intended.

== WheelPower ==
Since the early days of Guttmann, WheelPower has developed a range of sports activities and nowadays works with Sports Associations.

WheelPower employs Physical Activity Advisors, often those who have been successful Para sports athletes, to work in many of the U.K. Spinal Injuries Units.

The provision of sporting facilities at Stoke Mandeville started in the 1940s and in 1969 the Stoke Mandeville Stadium was opened by Queen Elizabeth II.

In 1984 the centre played host to the Paralympic Games with some 1200 athletes taking part in a festival of sport.

WheelPower organises a range of events to assist Sports Associations develop wheelchair sport within the UK. WheelPower also organises a variety of opportunities for disabled children and adults, these include:

=== Inter Spinal Unit Games ===
Annually hosted Games for recently paralysed patients of the 12 Spinal Units within the UK and Ireland providing coaching and an opportunity to try wheelchair sport including a introductory competition. Previous attendees include Paralympic athlete Matt Skelhon.

=== National Wheelchair Sport Championships ===
Together with a number of Sports Associations it organises the National Wheelchair Sport Championships. Some of these events have been expanded to include an international element to provide increased competition for participants.

== Sports ==
WheelPower supports, among others, the following sports:

- Archery
- Athletics
- Wheelchair basketball
- Bowls
- Cue sports
- Wheelchair fencing
- Handcycling
- Powerlifting
- Wheelchair racing
- Racquetball
- Rugby
- Shooting
- Sledge hockey
- Swimming
- Table tennis
- Tennis
- Winter sports

== See also ==
- International Wheelchair and Amputee Sports Federation
- Stoke Mandeville Stadium
