= Tanni Grey-Thompson =

Welsh wheelchair racer and parliamentarian (born 1969)

The Right Honourable The Baroness Grey-Thompson DBE DL
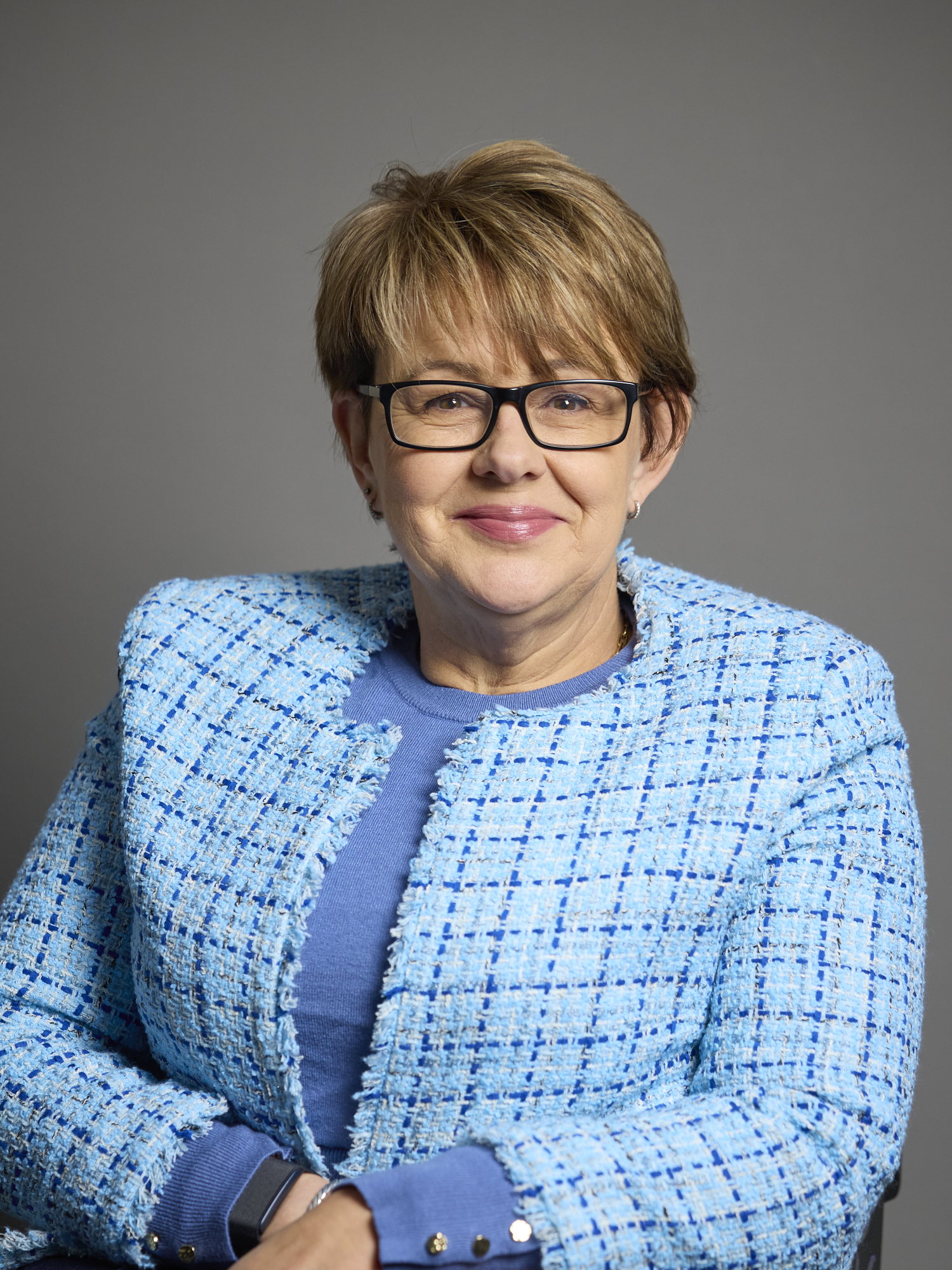
- Grey-Thompson in 2025

Member of the House of Lords
- Lord Temporal
- Life peerage 23 March 2010

Personal details
- Born: Carys Davina Grey; 26 July 1969 (age 57) Cardiff, Wales
- Citizenship: UK
- Party: None (crossbencher)
- Spouse: Ian Thompson (m. 1999)
- Children: 1
- Education: Loughborough University
- Occupation: Politician; athlete; TV personality
- Website: tanni.co.uk
- Nickname: Tanni Grey-Thompson
- Sports career
- Country: Great Britain; Wales
- Sport: Wheelchair racing
- Disability: Spina bifida
- Disability class: T53
- Retired: 2007
- Now coaching: Jade Jones
Medal record
Representing Great Britain
Women's athletics
Paralympic Games
Gold medal – first place	1992 Barcelona	100 m
Gold medal – first place	1992 Barcelona	200 m
Gold medal – first place	1992 Barcelona	400 m
Gold medal – first place	1992 Barcelona	800 m
Gold medal – first place	1996 Atlanta	800 m
Gold medal – first place	2000 Sydney	100 m
Gold medal – first place	2000 Sydney	200 m
Gold medal – first place	2000 Sydney	400 m
Gold medal – first place	2000 Sydney	800 m
Gold medal – first place	2004 Athens	100 m
Gold medal – first place	2004 Athens	400 m
Silver medal – second place	1992 Barcelona	4 × 100 m
Silver medal – second place	1996 Atlanta	100 m
Silver medal – second place	1996 Atlanta	200 m
Silver medal – second place	1996 Atlanta	400 m
Bronze medal – third place	1988 Seoul	400 m
World Championships
Gold medal – first place	1998 Birmingham	200m
Gold medal – first place	2006 Assen	200m
Silver medal – second place	1998 Birmingham	400m
Silver medal – second place	1998 Birmingham	800m
Silver medal – second place	2006 Assen	800m
Bronze medal – third place	2006 Assen	400m

Carys Davina "Tanni" Grey-Thompson, Baroness Grey-Thompson, DBE DL (née Grey; born 26 July 1969) is a British life peer, television presenter and former wheelchair racer.

== Athletic career ==
Grey-Thompson started wheelchair racing at the age of 13 and made her Paralympic debut for Wales at 15, in the 100m at the Junior National Games in 1984. She followed this up by winning the National Junior title in her last year as a junior.

Her international career began at the age of 19 in 1988 in Seoul, where she won a bronze medal in the 400m. As a young athlete she also competed in wheelchair basketball. Her fifth and last Paralympic Games were in Athens (2004) where she won two gold medals in wheelchair racing in the 100m and 400m. In total in her Paralympic career she won 16 medals (11 gold, four silver and a bronze) and also 13 World Championship medals (six gold, five silver and two bronze).

On 27 February 2007, Grey-Thompson announced her pending retirement, with her last appearance for Great Britain at May's Paralympic World Cup in Manchester. Over her career, she won a total of 16 Paralympic medals, including 11 golds, held over 30 world records and won the London Marathon six times between 1992 and 2002.

== Post-retirement ==
=== Career in television ===
In preparation for her retirement from the track in 2007, she expanded her television presenting career on BBC Wales and S4C, as well as BBC One.

Grey-Thompson has worked for the BBC on a number of sporting events. At the Glasgow 2014 Commonwealth Games, she worked as a reporter across multiple sports. For the Birmingham 2022 Commonwealth Games, she joined the athletics team as a pundit and commentator.

She was the first female wheelchair user in the world to present on television on BBC2's ground-breaking series for disabled people From the Edge.

She has also presented BBC Wales X-ray, Big Welsh Challenge, Land of our Mothers, and worked for BBC Radio Wales, Five Live, and Radio Cleveland. She was a key member of the BBC commentary team at the Beijing Paralympics 2008, and of subsequent Paralympics.

In February and April 2025 Tanni was a guest panellist on ITVs flagship show Loose Women.

=== Advisory and consultant roles ===
During her competitive career she sat on the board of the National Disability Council, The Sports Council for Wales, the English Lottery Awards Panel and UK Sport, and also sat for three years on the Mission 2012 panel (part of UK Sport). Grey-Thompson also sat on the board of the London Marathon (2007–2018), the board of Transport for London (2008–2018) and currently sits on the London Legacy Development Corporation. She chairs the board of ukactive.

Grey-Thompson is patron of numerous charities including the Duke of Edinburgh Awards scheme, WheelPower, the Wembley Stadium Legacy Trust, the Guernsey Disability Alliance and Zoe's Place Baby Hospice, a charity for sick babies and young children. She is also President of Sportsleaders UK, a UNICEF Ambassador, academy member of the Laureus World Sport Academy (trustee of the Sport for Good Foundation) and a Council member for the Winston Churchill Memorial Trust.

As well as this, she is the Patron of the Tees Wheelyboats Club, a group providing disabled people with access to the River Tees,

In July 2011, Grey-Thompson was announced as the President of the Leadership 20:20 Commission, the commission on the future leadership of Civil Society. She launched the commission's recommendations in Parliament on 14 December 2011.

Previously, she has also been a Trustee of V, the Tony Blair Sports Foundation, Sportsaid Foundation (of which she was a recipient as a young athlete), an International Inspiration Ambassador and Chair of the Women's Sports and Fitness Foundation Commission on the Future of Women's Sport.

Grey-Thompson has also been the Chancellor of Northumbria University since July 2015. replaced by George Clarke

In December 2021, Grey-Thompson was appointed as Chair of the North of Tyne Combined Authority's Inclusive Economy Board.

=== Parliamentary career ===
On 23 March 2010, Grey-Thompson was created a life peer on the recommendation of the House of Lords Appointments Commission (HOLAC). Despite previously suggesting a desire for a title with a Welsh connection, her title was conferred as Baroness Grey-Thompson, of Eaglescliffe in Stockton-On-Tees on 23 March 2010.

Grey-Thompson was introduced in the House of Lords on 29 March, swearing the oath of allegiance in both English and Welsh and sits as a crossbencher.

In August 2014, Grey-Thompson was one of 200 public figures who were signatories to a letter to The Guardian opposing Scottish independence in the run-up to September's referendum on that issue.

Grey-Thompson is an opponent of the Terminally Ill Adults (End of Life) Bill introduced by backbench Labour MP Kim Leadbeater in 2024. In 2026, she was a co-signatory to a letter to members of Parliament which argued that the bill "does not sufficiently guard against coercion or protect the most vulnerable people in our society."

== Honours ==
In 1993, she was appointed Member of the Order of the British Empire (MBE) for "services to Athletics for the Disabled", advanced in 2000 to Officer of the Order of the British Empire (OBE), and then in 2005 was promoted to Dame Commander of the Order of the British Empire (DBE), in both cases for "services to disabled sport".

Grey-Thompson was named the BBC Wales Sports Personality of the Year three times; in 1992, 2000 and 2004. In 2000, she came third in the BBC Sports Personality of the Year, behind Steve Redgrave and Denise Lewis. That year she also received the Helen Rollason Award for her performance at the 2000 Summer Paralympics. In August 2009, she was made a member of the Gorsedd at the 2009 National Eisteddfod in Bala, Gwynedd.

Willenhall School Sports College, West Midlands has named a house in her honour, where each of the eight houses is named after influential sports stars and local heroes. Roundwood Park School set up a house system in 2011. In July 2012, the blue house became Grey-Thompson house.

In 2003, Grey-Thompson was inducted into the WheelPower Stoke Mandeville Stadium Hall of Fame by the Prince of Wales.

In November 2012, she was appointed to the three-person commission that has been set up by the Union Cycliste Internationale to investigate the Lance Armstrong doping affair.

In February 2013, she was assessed as one of the 100 most powerful women in the United Kingdom by Woman's Hour on BBC Radio 4. In the same year, she was also recognized as one of the BBC's 100 Women.

In June 2018, she was inducted into Power Brands LIFE – Hall of Fame at London International Forum for Equality.

In January 2019, she was chosen as a contender for the "Greatest Person of the 20th Century" in the BBC Icons series but did not proceed beyond the 'Sports Stars' heat.

On 15 December 2019, she was given the BBC Sports Personality of the Year Lifetime Achievement Award.

=== Honorary degrees ===
Grey-Thompson has received numerous honorary degrees including Honorary Doctorates from Oxford University, Oxford Brookes University, the University of Greenwich, Loughborough University (both a Master and Doctorate), the University of Bath, Newcastle University, Liverpool John Moores, the University of Leicester, Sheffield Hallam University, University of Hull, University of Exeter, Heriot Watt University, the Open University, University of Wales Newport, the University of Wales, Leeds Metropolitan University, Teesside University, York and Ripon College, University of Swansea, University of Glamorgan, UWIC, University of Surrey, Southampton University, Manchester Metropolitan University, Staffordshire University and Cardiff University.

Grey-Thompson received a Lifetime Achievement Award and another Honorary Doctorate from the University of East London in May 2011, at the university's annual Sports Award evening held at West Ham United's Upton Park stadium.

On 15 June 2016, she was awarded the degree of Doctor of Law (honoris causa) by the University of Cambridge.

== Personal life ==
Grey-Thompson has spina bifida and is a wheelchair user. She was christened Carys Davina Grey, but her sister Sian, who is two years older than Tanni, referred to her as "tiny" when she first saw her, pronouncing it "tanni"; the nickname stuck.

Grey-Thompson attended St Cyres Comprehensive School in Penarth, South Wales. She graduated from Loughborough University in 1991 with a BA (Hons) degree in Politics and Social Administration.

She is married to Ian Thompson, a research chemist and former wheelchair athlete. They live at Eaglescliffe, Stockton-on-Tees; they have one daughter.

Her autobiography Seize the Day was published by Hodder and Stoughton in 2001.

== Paralympic World Cup medals ==
Year	Event	Position
2005	100 m	1st
2005	400 m	1st
2007	200 m	2nd

== Bibliography ==
- Grey-Thompson, Tanni (2001). Seize the Day: My Autobiography. London: Hodder and Stoughton. ISBN 978-0340819722.
- Grey-Thompson, Tanni (2007). Aim High. London: Accent Press Ltd. ISBN 978-1905170890.
