= Leticia Torres (Paralympian) =

Mexican Paralympic athlete

Medal record

Track and field (athletics)

Representing Mexico

Paralympic Games
Gold medal – first place	1988 Seoul	100m 1C
Gold medal – first place	1988 Seoul	200m 1C
Gold medal – first place	1988 Seoul	400m 1C
Gold medal – first place	1988 Seoul	800m 1C
Silver medal – second place	1988 Seoul	1500m 1C
Silver medal – second place	1996 Atlanta	200m T51
Bronze medal – third place	1992 Barcelona	100m TW2
Bronze medal – third place	1992 Barcelona	200m TW2
Bronze medal – third place	1992 Barcelona	400m TW2
Bronze medal – third place	1992 Barcelona	800m TW2
Bronze medal – third place	1996 Atlanta	400m T51
Bronze medal – third place	2004 Athens	200m T52
Bronze medal – third place	2004 Athens	200m T52

Parapan American Games
Silver medal – second place	2007 Rio de Janeiro	Shot put F32-34/52-54

Leticia Torres is a paralympic athlete from Mexico competing mainly in category T52 sprint events.

Letitia has competed in five Paralympics winning a total of thirteen medals. Her first games in 1988 were easily her most successful with winning gold in the 100m, 200m, 400m and 800m and finishing second in the 1500m to West Germany's Yolande Hansen. In her next games in 1992 she would win bronze medals in the 100m, 200m and 400m but crowned this off with a silver in the 800m. 1996 Summer Paralympics would see her improve in the 200m to a silver with a bronze in 400m but for the first time she failed to medal in an event when finishing fifth in the 800m. 2000 would prove a low point with Letitia failing to win a medal in any of the 200m, 400m, 800m or 1500m. She did return for the 2004 Summer Paralympics where she competed in her first field event in the Paralympics when finishing fifth in the discus but returned to medal winning in the 200m and 400m with two bronze medals.
