= Karen Lewis-Archer =

Scottish Paralympic athlete

Personal information
- Born: 12 October 1974 Carluke, Scotland
- Died: 14 December 2016 (aged 42) Newcastle upon Tyne, England

Sport
- Country: Great Britain
- Sport: Paralympic athletics
- Disability: Spina bifida
- Disability class: T52
- Club: Red Star Athletic Club, Glasgow
Medal record
Paralympic athletics
Representing Great Britain
World Championships
Gold medal – first place	1998 Birmingham	400m T52
Silver medal – second place	1998 Birmingham	800m T52
Bronze medal – third place	1998 Birmingham	1500m T52
Bronze medal – third place	2002 Lille	200m T52
European Championships
Gold medal – first place	2003 Assen	400m T52
Silver medal – second place	2003 Assen	100m T52
Silver medal – second place	2003 Assen	200m T52

Karen Lewis-Archer (12 October 1974 – 14 December 2016) was a Scottish Paralympic athlete who competed internationally for Great Britain at international track and field competitions, she competed at the 2000 and 2004 Summer Paralympics. She was one of Scotland's best female wheelchair athletes when she competed and has won multiple World and European medals.

Lewis-Archer died on 14 December 2016 following health complications related to cancer.
