= Lucía Sosa (athlete) =

Mexican Paralympic athlete (born 1978)

Medal record

Track and field (athletics)

Representing Mexico

Paralympic Games
Silver medal – second place	2004 Athens	400 metres - T52

Lucía Sosa Vázquez (born September 12, 1978, in Michoacán) is a paralympic athlete from Mexico competing mainly in category T52 sprint events.

Lucia competed in the 2004 Summer Paralympics in the 200m and winning a silver medal in the 400m.
