= Weitao Yang =

Chinese-born American chemist (born 1961)

Weitao Yang (Chinese: 杨伟涛; pinyin: Yáng Wěitāo; born March 31, 1961) is a Chinese-born American chemist who is the Philip Handler Professor of Chemistry at Duke University. His main contributions to chemistry include density functional theory development, and its applications to chemistry.

== Biography ==
Yang was born in Chaozhou, Guangdong, China, on March 31, 1961. He entered Peking University in 1978 as part of the first generation of college students after the Cultural Revolution. He received his BS in chemistry in 1982, after which he studied theoretical chemistry as a PhD student with Robert G. Parr at the University of North Carolina, Chapel Hill. He completed his PhD degree in 1986 and worked as a postdoc with Parr (1986–1987) and William H. Miller (1988–1989). Yang currently works in the department of chemistry at Duke University since 1990, as assistant professor, associate professor, professor, and Philip Handler Professor of Chemistry.

== Contributions ==
Yang's main contributions to theoretical chemistry range from fundamental theory to applications of density functional theory. He (with Parr) developed the concepts of the Fukui function, hardness, and softness in density functional theory. He also justified the theoretical ground of potential functional (as in Optimized-Effective-Potential methods) and fractional-number-of-electron approaches. The Lee–Yang–Parr (shortened to LYP) correlation functional by Yang and his coworkers is extensively used in chemistry and was the second most cited article in chemistry from 1999 to 2006. Yang developed the Divide and Conquer algorithm for linear-scaling density functional theory. In application, Yang also developed methods in QM/MM simulation for large chemistry and biology systems. His book with Robert G. Parr, Density-Functional Theory of Atoms and Molecules, is considered to be the basic textbook in the field of density functional theory.

== Awards and honors ==
- 1997 Annual Medal of the International Academy of Quantum Molecular Science
- 1999–2006 The Lee–Yang–Parr correlation energy functional, also known as the LYP functional (Phys. Rev. B 37, 785, 1988) has been the second most cited paper in chemistry for all seven years from 1999 to 2006 since CAS started publishing citation data online. Number of citations is over 25,000.
- 2003 Elected a Fellow of the American Physical Society.
- 2006 Humboldt Research Award for Senior U.S. Scientists
- 2010 International Solvay Chair in Chemistry, International Solvay Institutes for Physics and Chemistry, Brussels, Belgium
- 2012 American Chemical Society National Award for Computers in Chemical and Pharmaceutical Research

== Family life ==
He is married to Helen Wen Yang and they have two children.

== See also ==
- Density functional theory
- Robert G. Parr
