= Jessica Matassa =

Canadian Paralympic athlete (born 1986)

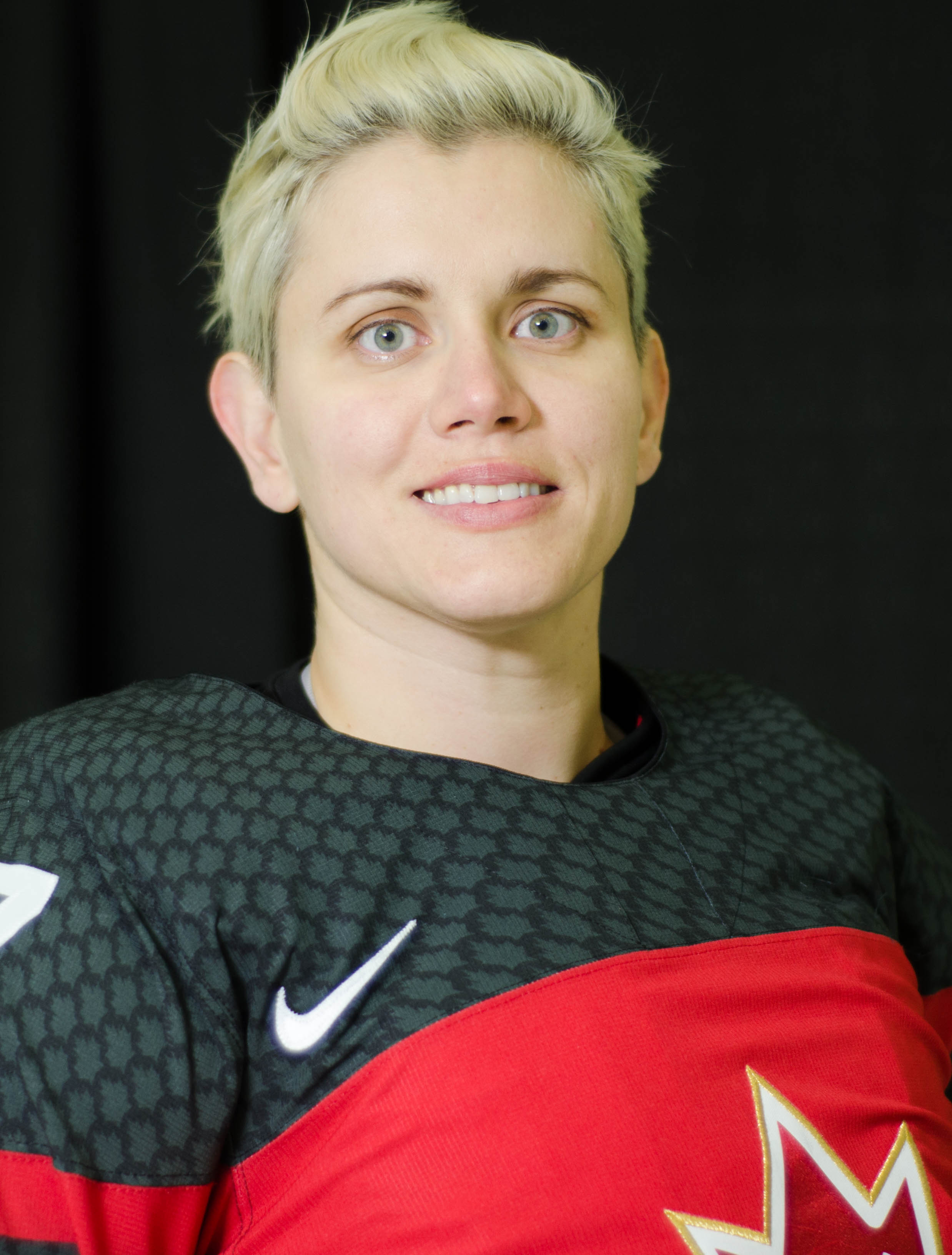

Personal information
- Born: June 6, 1986 (age 40) Windsor, Ontario, Canada

Sport
- Country: Canada
- Sport: T54 sprint, para ice hockey
Medal record
Track and field
Representing Canada
Paralympic Games
Bronze medal – third place	2004 Athens	800m T54
Parapan American Games
Gold medal – first place	2007 Rio de Janeiro	200m T54
Gold medal – first place	2007 Rio de Janeiro	400m T54
Gold medal – first place	2007 Rio de Janeiro	800m T54

Jessica Matassa (born June 6, 1986) is a paralympic athlete from Canada competing mainly in category T54 sprint events. She was born in Windsor, Ontario.

== Athletics ==
Jessica has twice competed in the 200m, 400m and 800m at the Summer Paralympics, firstly in 2004 where she won a bronze medal in the T54 800m and then again in 2008.

Matassa underwent numerous surgeries in 2006 that prevented her from competing in 2006. She was not expected to compete again. However, after months of rehabilitation she was given the all clear to compete in 2007 and qualified for the 2007 Parapan American Games in Rio de Janeiro, Brazil. She won gold in all three of her events: 200m, 400m and 800m.

Matassa competed as part of Team Canada at the 2008 Beijing Paralympic Games. Placing 5th in the 200m followed by 7th in the 400m.

In 2009, Matassa competed in the Boston Marathon placing 5th overall among wheelchair racers.

Matassa retired from racing following several surgeries in 2010 which led to her becoming deconditioned.

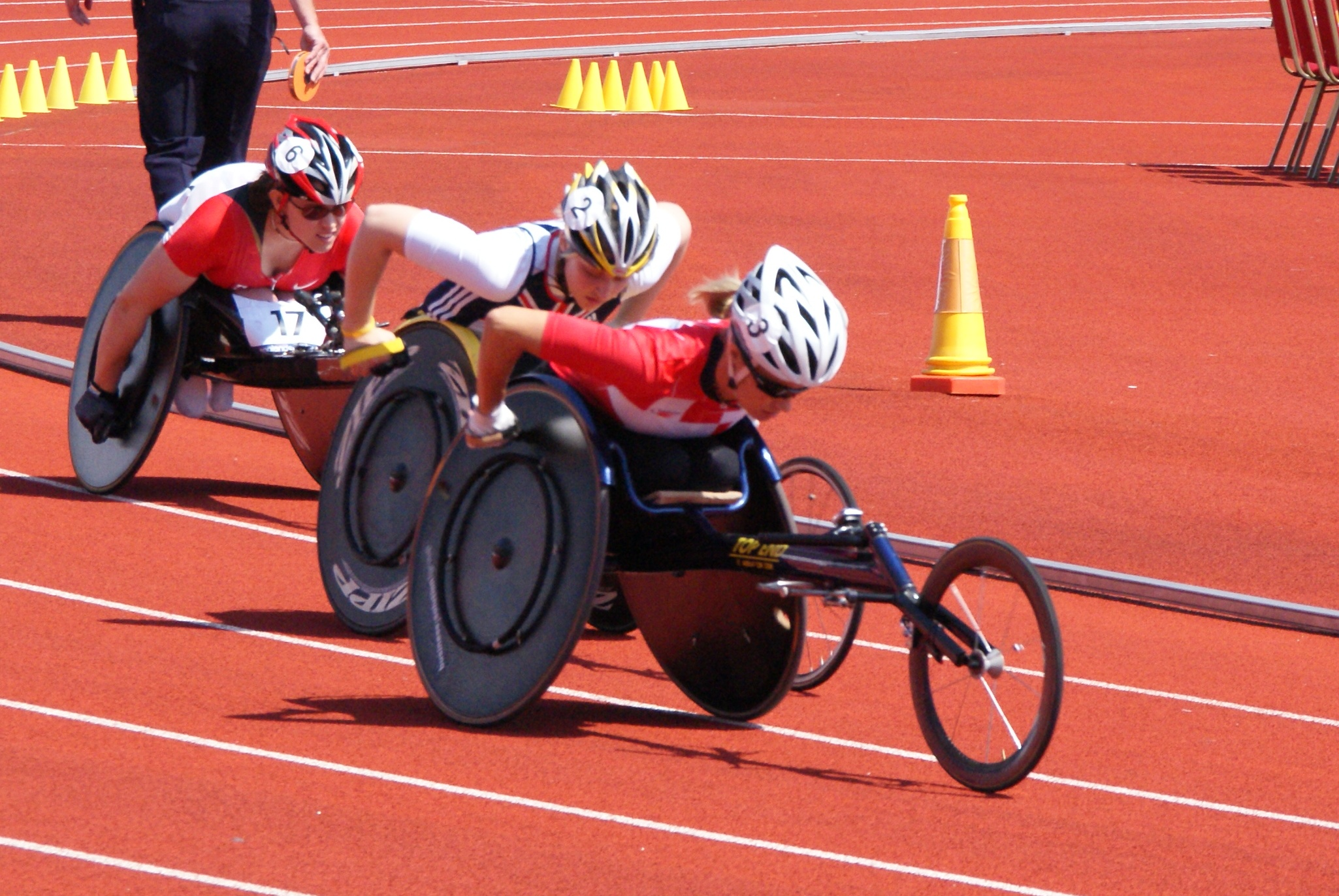
Jessica Matassa (#17) in 2009

== Ice sledge hockey ==
In 2015, Matassa returned to parasport coming full-circle and rejoining the Windsor Icebullets. Encouraged by teammate Ashley Goure, Matassa attended Team Canada's selection camp the following season. Matassa was named to Team Canada's Women's National Sledge Hockey team roster for her first time in 2016. During her time on the team, she was one of several team members who were vocal about the sport's national governing organization (NGO), Hockey Canada and their minimal support, regard and funding for the Women's Sledge Hockey Team. Matassa retired in 2019. While competing for Team Canada, Matassa continued training and playing with the Windsor Ice Bullets along with fellow Team Canada member Ashley Goure, and former Team Canada members Genna Norton and Heather Stewart. At that time, 2016–2019, the Windsor Icebullets had one of the highest ratios of women to men in the Ontario Sledge Hockey League.

== Personal life ==
Matassa was born with spina bifida. In 2006, Matassa required surgery to correct Tethered spinal cord syndrome. Several serious complications followed requiring 6 additional surgeries within 8 months, including reoccurring Cerebrospinal fluid leaks that ultimately lead to life-threatening Meningitis. The initial tethered cord surgery was not successful due to the severity of the tethering of the spinal cord and Matassa would later required a cordectomy. In 2009, Matassa earned a private pilot's license. An achievement that required Matassa to design, test and have manufactured a set of hand controls, under the review and laws of Transport Canada to operate the rudder and brakes of a Rockwell Commander 112. Matassa's husband is Cameron Sinclair. The two met in 2017 after meeting through common friendships within the Sledge Hockey Community. They married in 2022.
