= Chantal Petitclerc =

Canadian politician and paralympic athlete

The Honourable Chantal Petitclerc CC CQ MSM
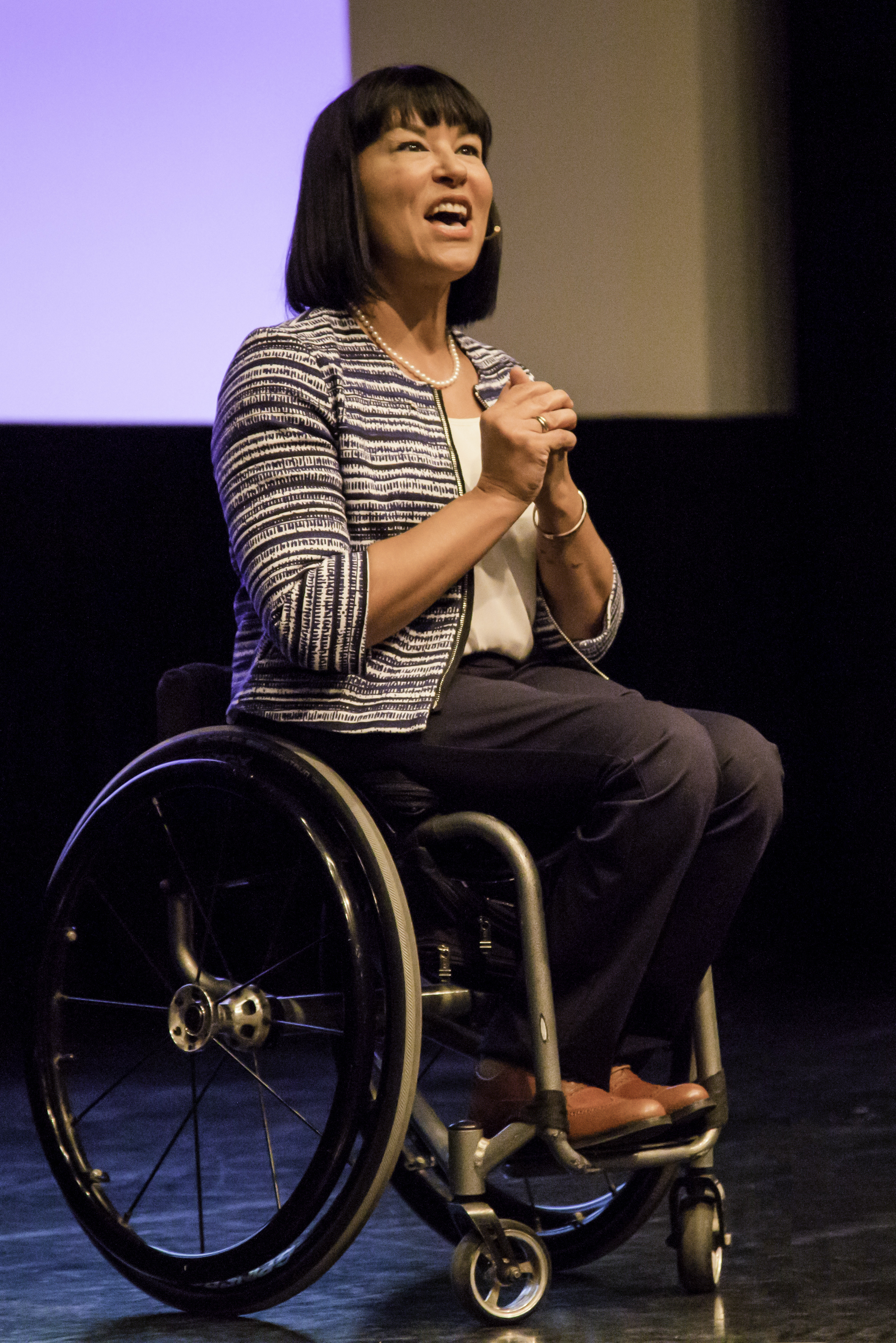
- Petitclerc in 2017

Canadian Senator from Grandville
- Incumbent
- Assumed office 18 March 2016
- Nominated by: Justin Trudeau
- Appointed by: David Johnston
- Preceded by: Andrée Champagne (2014)

Personal details
- Born: 15 December 1969 (age 56) Saint-Marc-des-Carrières, Quebec, Canada
- Party: Independent Senators Group
- Spouse: James Duhamel
- Children: Elliot Duhamel
- Sports career
- Country: Canada
- Sport: wheelchair racer
Medal record
Women's athletics
Representing Canada
Paralympic Games
Gold medal – first place	1996 Atlanta	100 m T54
Gold medal – first place	1996 Atlanta	200 m T54
Gold medal – first place	2000 Sydney	200 m T54
Gold medal – first place	2000 Sydney	800 m T54
Gold medal – first place	2004 Athens	100 m T54
Gold medal – first place	2004 Athens	200 m T54
Gold medal – first place	2004 Athens	400 m T54
Gold medal – first place	2004 Athens	800 m T54
Gold medal – first place	2004 Athens	1500 m T54
Gold medal – first place	2008 Beijing	100 m T54
Gold medal – first place	2008 Beijing	200 m T54
Gold medal – first place	2008 Beijing	400 m T54
Gold medal – first place	2008 Beijing	800 m T54
Gold medal – first place	2008 Beijing	1500 m T54
Silver medal – second place	1996 Atlanta	400 m T54
Silver medal – second place	1996 Atlanta	800 m T54
Silver medal – second place	1996 Atlanta	1500 m T54
Silver medal – second place	2000 Sydney	100 m T54
Silver medal – second place	2000 Sydney	400 m T54
Bronze medal – third place	1992 Barcelona	200 m TW4
Bronze medal – third place	1992 Barcelona	800 m TW4

Chantal Petitclerc CC CQ MSM (born 15 December 1969) is a Canadian wheelchair racer and a Senator from Quebec.

== Early life ==
At the age of 13, Petitclerc lost the use of both legs in an accident when at a friend's farm, a heavy barn door fell on her, fracturing her spine at the L1-T12 vertebra. Gaston Jacques, a high school physical education teacher, was to have a decisive influence on her life when he taught her to swim for four lunch hours a week throughout high school as she was unable to participate in the gym course. In a 2011 interview, she stated that, "[swimming] really helped me get more fit and stronger, and helped me live a more independent life in a wheelchair." Swimming also allowed her to discover her competitive drive. While she had previously been first in her class academically, it was her introduction to the world of competitive racing.

== Sport ==
When she was eighteen, Pierre Pomerleau, a trainer at Université Laval in Quebec City, introduced her to wheelchair sports. Using a homemade wheelchair, she took part in her first race and came last, well behind the other competitors. However, she had fallen in love with wheelchair racing and a long and fruitful career had begun.

While Petitclerc was developing her skills as a wheelchair athlete, she pursued her studies, first in social sciences at the CEGEP de Sainte-Foy and then in history at the University of Alberta in Edmonton, where she registered in order to be able to train with Peter Eriksson, who remains her coach to this day.

Petitclerc competed in the Paralympic Games for the first time in Barcelona in 1992, returning with two bronze medals, the start of collection that now includes twenty one Paralympic medals, fourteen of them gold. Four years later, at the Atlanta games, she took gold medals in the 100 and 200 m events and three silvers in the 400, 800, and 1500 m races. At the 2000 Summer Paralympics, she won two golds, in the 200 m and 800 m, and two silvers, in the 100 m and 400 m races. She won three gold medals (in 100 m, 200 m, and 400 m) and a bronze (800 m) at the 2002 World Championships and a gold at the 2002 Commonwealth Games in the 800 m. At the 2004 Summer Olympics (where wheelchair racing was an exhibition sport) she won the 800 m, and went on to an impressive showing with 5 gold medals at the 2004 Summer Paralympics. When she returned from Athens in 2004, Petitclerc told reporters the 2008 Summer Paralympics in Beijing would be her last big international meeting but that she will continue training and road racing for a while. For her performance in 2008, she was awarded the Lou Marsh Trophy as Canadian athlete of the year and the Canadian Press's Bobbie Rosenfeld Award as Canada's female athlete of the year. Petitclerc was also awarded the Best Female award at the Paralympic Sport Awards.

With her 5 golds in the 2004 Paralympics, she tied the existing Canadian gold medal record at a single Games, Winter or Summer, set by Stephanie Dixon at the 2000 Summer Paralympics. Her 5 golds in the 2008 Paralympics tied that record. As of 2010, the record still stood. As of 2012 she holds five world records for wheelchair racing. As of 2019 she is still the most gold-medalled female paralympic athlete with 14 golds and 21 medals.

She was chosen as the flagbearer of the Canadian team at the opening ceremonies of the 2006 Commonwealth Games.

Petitclerc lives in Montreal, and trains at Complexe sportif Claude-Robillard.

Rio Tinto Alcan is her main sponsor since 1998.

Petitclerc was appointed as a coach and mentor to the British athletics team ahead of the 2012 Summer Paralympics, working alongside her former coach and UK Athletics' Paralympic head coach Peter Eriksson.

Petitclerc was named the Chef de Mission for Canada's 2014 Commonwealth Games team. She was also named Chef de Mission for the 2016 Paralympic Games in Rio de Janeiro.

== Personal life ==
Petitclerc is married to electro-acoustic music composer James Duhamel and gave birth to son Elliot in December 2013.

== Senate ==
On 18 March 2016, Petitclerc was named to the Senate of Canada on the advice of Prime Minister Justin Trudeau. She sits as a member of the Independent Senators Group. Her main priorities in the Senate are health as well as the rights of persons with disabilities. In June 2016, Senator Petitclerc delivered her first speech in the Chamber on Bill C-14, An Act to amend the Criminal Code and to make related amendments to other Acts (medical assistance in dying). Her speech moved many of her colleagues, when she quoted: "When you have a disability, the worst part is feeling as if you have no control over your own life, over your own body. It happens to all people with disabilities, I can assure you." She also sponsored Bill S-5, An Act to amend the Tobacco Act and the Non Smokers' Health Act and to make consequential amendments to other acts.

== Honours and awards ==
The St-Marc-des-Carrières municipal ice hockey arena now bears her name.

In 2002, Petitclerc was awarded with the Meritorious Service Medal (civil division).

In 2005, Petitclerc was invested as a Knight of the Order of Quebec. That year, Petitclerc became part of the Canadian Disability Hall of Fame.

On 16 June 2009, it was announced that Petitclerc would receive a star on Canada's Walk of Fame in Toronto. The induction ceremony was held on 12 September 2009.

In 2009, she was invested as a Companion of the Order of Canada "for her achievements as a Paralympic champion known internationally as an inspiration, and for her commitment to developing sports for athletes with a disability".

In 2010, she was inducted into Canada's Sports Hall of Fame in Calgary, Alberta.

In 2012, she was awarded an Honorary Doctor of Laws degree by the University of Alberta.

Petitclerc has also received both the Queen's Golden Jubilee Medal and the Queen's Diamond Jubilee Medal.

In 2015, Petitclerc was inducted into the Canadian Paralympic Hall of Fame of the Canadian Paralympic Committee.

== See also ==
- Athletes with most gold medals in one event at the Paralympic Games
