= Birdsville Courthouse =

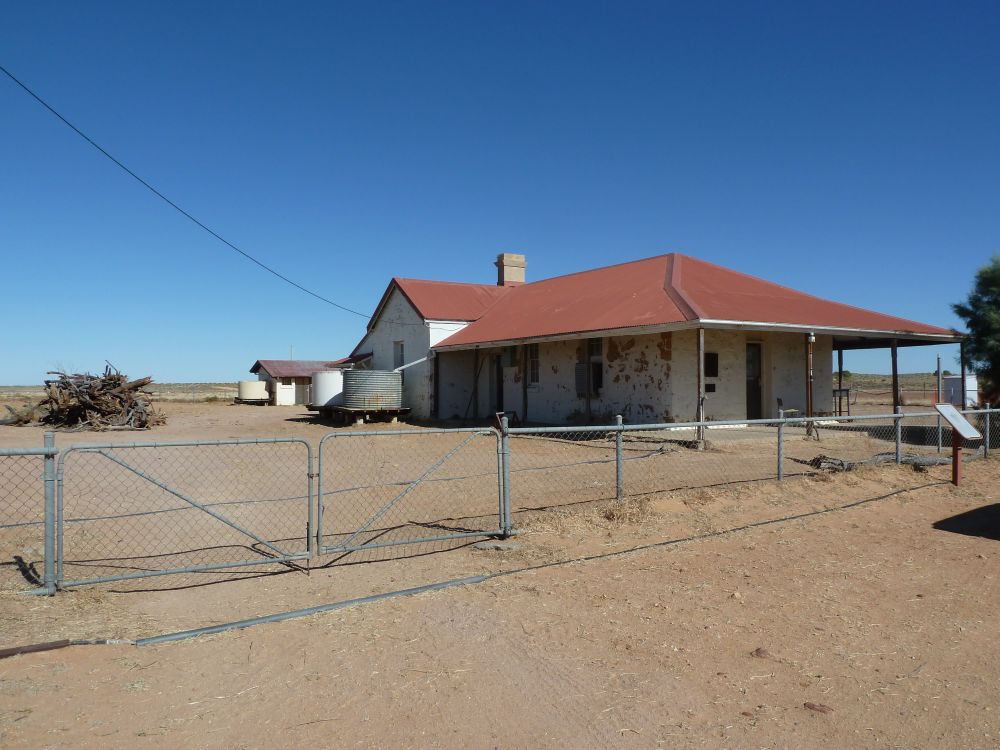
- Birdsville Courthouse, 2011

- Location within Queensland
- 25.9004°S 139.3483°E
- Location: Adelaide Street, Birdsville, Shire of Diamantina, Queensland, Australia

History
- Design period: 1870s–1890s (late 19th century)
- Built: 1888–1890

Site notes
- Architect: Queensland Department of Works

Queensland Heritage Register
- Official name: Birdsville Courthouse
- Type: state heritage (built)
- Designated: 21 October 1992
- Reference no.: 600460
- Significant period: 1880s (historical); 1888–1910s (fabric)
- Significant components: lock-up, court house
- Builders: J Wookey and Henry Walton

Birdsville Courthouse is a heritage-listed courthouse at Adelaide Street, Birdsville, Shire of Diamantina, Queensland, Australia. It was designed by the Queensland Department of Works and built from 1888 to 1890 by J Wookey and Henry Walton. It was added to the Queensland Heritage Register on 21 October 1992.

== History ==
The Birdsville Courthouse was erected between 1888 and 1890 and is part of a police and judiciary complex which continues in use to the present day, although other buildings on the reserve have been constructed and removed over time.

Although European explorers had passed through the Diamantina district in the 1840s and early 1860s, pastoralists did not occupy this semi-arid region until the mid-1870s. Annandale, Pandie Pandie, Glengyle, and Roseberth were taken up in 1876; Sandringham, Carcory and Haddon Downs in 1877; and Dubbo Downs in 1878. Monkira, Mt Leonard, Cluny, and Coorabulka were other early holdings.

In the early 1880s, the towns of Birdsville and Bedourie were established to service the newly taken up pastoral holdings. It is thought that a merchant named Matthew Flynn, who carried stores for the stations, built a rough depot in the late 1870s at the site of the present town of Birdsville. The place was then known as the Diamantina Crossing, on the stock route from Boulia south to Adelaide. In 1885, the township was officially surveyed and given the name of Birdsville, reputedly at the suggestion of Robert Frew, owner of Pandie Pandie Station, who also had a store and shop at the Diamantina Crossing, in reference to the profuse bird life of the district. Diamantina Shire was established in 1883, and its headquarters were at Birdsville until moved to Bedourie in 1953.

At the time of the town survey, several buildings had been erected including hotels, several stores, blacksmiths and a police lock-up. Almost all the buildings in the town were of local sandstone, there being no local timber available. Distance and the lack of good access roads or a railway created prohibitively high transportation costs, so imported building materials were kept to a minimum. The buildings in the area are also subject to storms and other climatic extremes.

Birdsville developed as an administrative centre for police and border customs. It is over 1,000 miles (1,600 km) west of Brisbane and 7 miles (11 km) north of the state border with South Australia and was one of 14 border posts established before Federation to maintain tariff walls between the colonies. Birdsville was on a major stock route down the Diamantina via Boulia and Bedourie to southern markets, and it became an important marshalling point for cattle being driven south to South Australia. Most of the town's trade was with Adelaide, and by 1889 the population of Birdsville was 110, and the town had 2 general stores, 3 hotels, a police station, school, 2 blacksmith shops, 2 bakers, a cordial manufacturer, bootmaker, saddler, auctioneer & commission agent, and a number of residences. The population peaked in 1895 at 220.

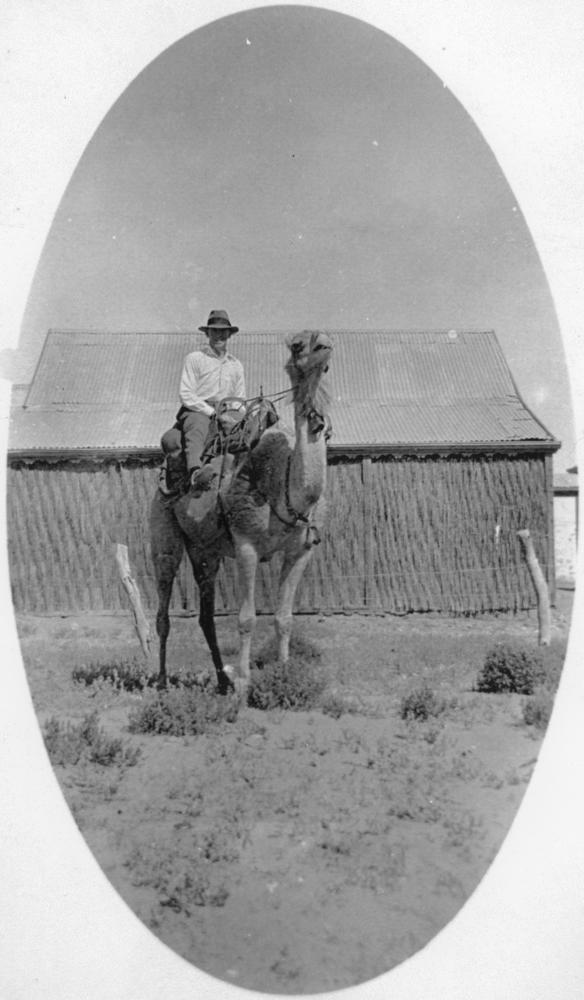
Police Constable William Patrick Boyle mounted on a camel, Birdsville, 1927

A courthouse was constructed by the Queensland Department of Works. Initially, the contract was let in 1888 to Henry Walton, for £840. By late 1889 this had been transferred to J Wookey, at the same price, but was in the event completed by Walton by the end of 1890. It was built on the police reserve and was part of a complex including a police station, lockup, tracker's quarters, and horse yards, although camels had also been used for police work in Birdsville since 1886.

Climatic conditions in the area are extreme, and in 1904 the police station building was "completely wrecked" in a violent storm. A 1928 sketch plan of the site shows the "ruins of the old police station" on the southwest corner of the site. In 1919 the cells built in 1906 were said to be falling apart, but are visible in photographs taken in the 1920s. On 14 February 1954, the cell block, by then no longer in use, was completely demolished by a whirlwind. A new cell and store block was built in 1958 to a similar plan with the addition of a garage to one side and was in use by 1959. In the intervening period, prisoners were restrained by handcuffing them to a chain in the yard.

In 1972 the lockup was said to be in poor condition. Two years later major repairs and repainting were carried out to the station, residence, and lockup. This included adding electric lighting and a shower to the cells to extend their useful life. A new police residence was built in 1980/1, but the old one continued to be used when needed, usually during the annual Birdsville Races. This event has become a major tourist attraction and even in 1982 was drawing crowds of 5,000 to the town. Extra police personnel are sent to Birdsville at this time to maintain order and to carry out crowd control duties. As there is only one hotel in the town, the old courthouse/police station provides accommodation.

In December 1985, a severe storm badly damaged the tracker's quarters at the rear of the station. This was a small structure clad in corrugated iron and lost sections of the wall and roof. At the time it was only being used for storage and permission was given for demolition in 1986.

A modern police station including cells and quarters was designed in 1987 and opened on 9 August 1988. The lockup survives and in 1995 permission was given to the Solar-Terrestrial Environment Laboratory at Nagoya University, Japan, to install scientific recording equipment in it.

The courthouse has changed little in form, although the verandahs have been built in and an extension containing a bathroom and laundry has been constructed on the northwest side adjoining the accommodation area.

== Description ==
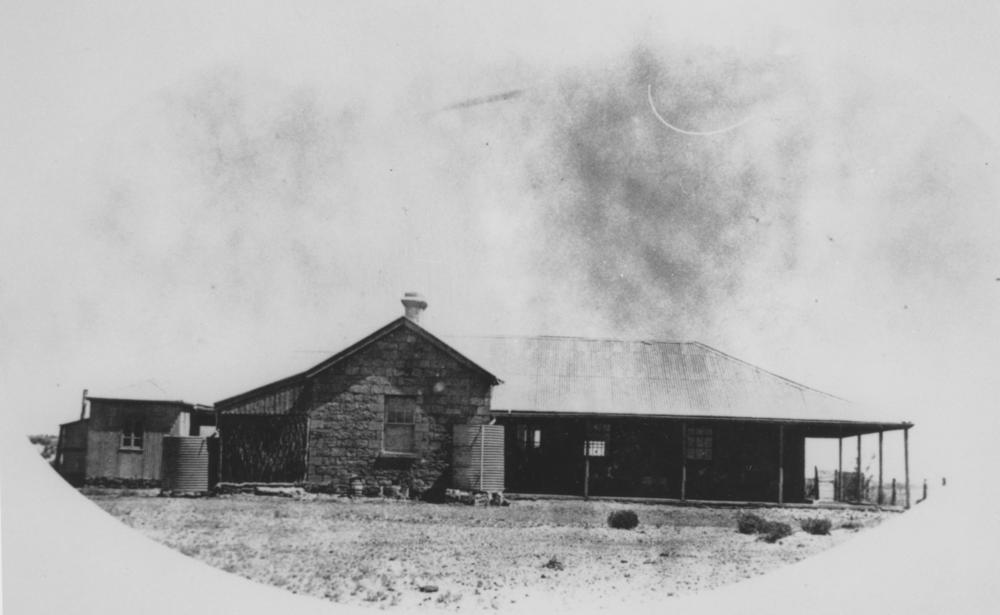
Police Station and Court House, circa 1925

The courthouse is on the eastern side of the reserve and is roughly L-shaped in form, combining a courtroom in one wing and offices/residential accommodation in the other. It is a single storey building, the core of which is constructed of local stone cut in blocks and painted, and which is roofed in corrugated iron.

The courtroom is to the east and is surrounded on three sides by verandahs. The roof is hipped at the eastern end, and the roof extends over the verandahs and is supported on posts. The courtroom has a door, and two double hung sash windows to each long side and the main entrance is at the eastern end. The interior walls are plastered, and the bench is at the rear.

To the west of the courtroom are two rooms sharing a double chimney. These are connected to each other and open onto what was formerly a verandah, but has now been built in with weatherboard and has casement windows. To the north are rooms used as a bedroom, and a kitchen after the detached kitchen was removed. To the western side of the kitchen is an extension containing a toilet, bathroom and laundry. The walls of this are clad in corrugated iron. To the north of the kitchen, the second original verandah has also been built in. The new walls are clad with metal decking on the lower half with glass louvres above.

The old lockup is a simple masonry building with a gabled roof clad in corrugated iron. It has two rooms with a screened verandah and a store/garage to one side.

== Heritage listing ==
Birdsville Courthouse was listed on the Queensland Heritage Register on 21 October 1992 having satisfied the following criteria.

The place is important in demonstrating the evolution or pattern of Queensland's history.

The Birdsville Courthouse survives as an important link with the earliest establishment of pastoral settlement in the Diamantina district of far western Queensland and with Birdsville's pre-Federation role as a border post.

The place demonstrates rare, uncommon or endangered aspects of Queensland's cultural heritage.

The place is rare as one of only three surviving masonry buildings in Birdsville, the others being the c. 1883 former Royal Hotel and the c. 1884 Birdsville Hotel. These contribute significantly to the historic character of the town which, in the last quarter of the 20th century, became a major Queensland tourist attraction.

The place is important in demonstrating the principal characteristics of a particular class of cultural places.

The Courthouse is important in illustrating the principal characteristics of a vernacular style of masonry construction that spread throughout central Australia, across South Australia, the Northern Territory and Queensland in the late 19th century, efficiently controlling the extremes of temperature in the hot, arid interior of the continent, and compensating for the lack of locally available timber.

The place is important because of its aesthetic significance.

The place has aesthetic value, and is important in defining the Birdsville townscape.

The place has a strong or special association with a particular community or cultural group for social, cultural or spiritual reasons.

The Birdsville court house has had a long connection with the people of the surrounding district as the focus for the administration of justice.
