= Kidman's Tree of Knowledge =

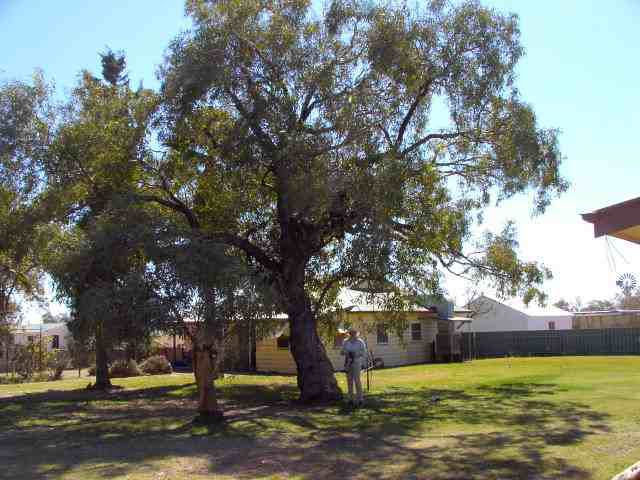
- Kidman's Tree of Knowledge, 2005

- Location within Queensland
- 24.785°S 139.5925°E
- Location: Glengyle Station, Bedourie, Shire of Diamantina, Queensland, Australia

History
- Design period: 1900–1914 (early 20th century)

Queensland Heritage Register
- Official name: Kidman's Tree of Knowledge, Tree of Knowledge
- Type: state heritage (landscape)
- Designated: 21 October 1992
- Reference no.: 600462
- Significant period: 1910s (historical); 1910s (social)
- Significant components: trees of social, historic or special significance

Kidman's Tree of Knowledge is a heritage-listed tree at Glengyle Station, Bedourie, Shire of Diamantina, Queensland, Australia. It is also known as Tree of Knowledge. It was added to the Queensland Heritage Register on 21 October 1992.

== History ==
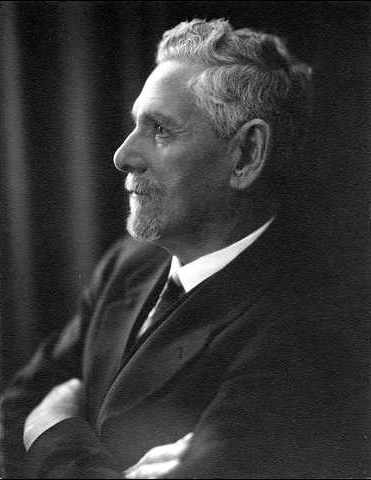
Sidney Kidman, 1927

Kidman's Tree of Knowledge is located on Glengyle Station in Queensland's Diamantina district and has become associated with Sir Sidney Kidman and the vast pastoral empire he established in the Australian interior in the late 19th and early 20th centuries.

The mature coolibah (Eucalyptus coolibah) is reputedly the tree under which Sidney Kidman camped when contemplating the development of his pastoral empire in Western Queensland. Glengyle Station on which the tree is situated subsequently proved to be the most important in Kidman's chain of properties that eventually stretched from the Barkly Tableland through to the Barrier Range in South Australia. However, while Kidman visited and purchased stock from Glengyle he did not acquire the leasehold until 1913.

Although European explorers had passed through the Diamantina district in the 1840s and early 1860s, pastoralists did not occupy this semi-arid region until the mid-1870s. In 1876 Patrick Drinan took up Annandale Station and Duncan McGregor took up Glengyle. Also taken up at this period were Sandringham and Carcory in 1877 and Dubbo Downs in 1878. The towns of Birdsville and Bedourie developed in the late 1870s/early 1880s to service these newly established Channel Country runs. The Diamantina and Georgina rivers, Cooper and Eyre creeks are part of a network of western Queensland waterways known as the Channel Country. They draw water from an area of 566,000 square kilometres. These systems contain innumerable waterholes of various depth and length that generally last throughout the dry season, however, after rain, the network of rivers, creeks and channels links together, stretching out over a vast floodplain like fingers, hence the name Channel Country. While some of the properties such as Glengyle border the Simpson Desert and have many square kilometres of sand dunes, the natural irrigation following the tropical north wet season means the land is ideal for grazing cattle.

Sidney Kidman was born on 9 May 1857 at Athelstone near Adelaide, the son of English immigrants. At about 13 years of age he left home and made his way north to Poolamacca Station in the Barrier Range where he met up with his brother, George. He acquired work with George Raines, a landless bushman who travelled the countryside taking advantage of unfenced lands where there was good feeding for his stock. It was at this time that Kidman learnt numerous bush survival skills and came to appreciate the knowledge and skills of the Aboriginal people.

In the early 1870s Kidman obtained work on various stations, drove cattle and bullocks, carted goods, opened a butcher's shop at Cobar shortly after the rush started and soon after went into business with his brother droving, buying stock and dealing. They took on mail contracts, ran a butchery in Broken Hill and in the 1890s started buying pastoral leaseholds as Kidman Brothers.

As a young man Sidney Kidman had talked widely with cattlemen about the Australian interior and in his travels buying and selling stock, realised the value of Channel Country land. His aim was to acquire a chain of properties so that in times of drought cattle could be moved from properties badly affected to areas with good grass. Eventually Kidman acquired two strings of properties. The first or "main chain" stretched from the Barkly Tablelands near the Gulf of Carpentaria down through the Channel Country of western Queensland and along the Birdsville Track to the rail head at Maree in South Australia. The second chain of stations followed the Overland Telegraph line from the Fitzroy River and Victoria River Downs Station in the north to Wilpena Station in the Flinders Ranges near Adelaide. The development of the Kidman empire in Queensland stems from Kidman Brothers' acquisition of Annandale in the Channel Country in 1896.

As result of his acquisitions, his knowledge of the bush and his business acumen Kidman's empire was able to survive the depression of the 1890s and the drought of 1899–1902.

The Pastoralists' Review of 16 September 1903 featured an interview with Sidney Kidman, the "Cattle King". It included biographical information about his life and detailed the properties he then owned: In the Northern Territory: Victoria Downs, with its 45,000 head of cattle, Newcastle Waters, Austral Downs; South Australia: Lake Albert, Eringa, Peake, Macumba, Mount Nor'-West, Clayton, Coongy on the cooper, Pandie Pandyie on the Diamantina, Alton Downs; and Queensland: Annandale, Collegwairi, Dubbo, Cartrey, Rocklands, Monkira, Bulla Downs; in New South Wales: Wompah and Tickelara. Kidman continued to buy properties, buy and sell cattle and horses and manage his properties while almost continuously on the move. He kept abreast of market fluctuations, weather conditions and what was happening on his properties, via the telegraph.

While Kidman abhorred wastefulness and was known to sack employees who exhibited such traits, he was also known to be generous to deserving causes. He gained a reputation for munificence to the war effort, his World War I donations including wool, meat, horses, ambulances and warplanes. In monetary terms this patriotic generosity amounted to hundreds of thousands of pounds. In 1921 he was knighted for his contribution to the war effort.

The leasehold to Glengyle Station was transferred several times after Duncan McGregor took up the run in 1876. The London Bank of Australia held the lease until William Frederick Buchanan had purchased the Glengyle holding by October 1907. Following the death of this Narrabri grazier in 1911 the lease was transferred to William Buchanan and Charles Henry Buchanan.

The 1008 square mile Glengyle leasehold became part of the Kidman empire in 1913 when he purchased the lease from the Buchanans for £1,575. Kidman had long wanted Glengyle Station for its size and its permanent deep waterholes on the Georgina River, its plains and flats of lignum and saltbush, and its strategic position adjoining his Queensland properties of Sandringham, Kaliduwarry, Dubbo Downs and Annandale. Moreover, Glengyle, between Eyre Creek and the sand hills of the Simpson Desert, did not always need to rely on local rainfall. In good seasons it is drained by channels fed by the northern monsoon. The property proved pivotal to the Kidman holdings in the Lake Eyre Basin and is still held by the family firm S Kidman and Company.

Kidman had married in 1885 and raised a family of 3 daughters and one son in Adelaide. Kidman retired in 1927 but his children continued to run the family business empire from Adelaide. On 2 September 1935, aged 78 years, Sir Sidney Kidman died in Adelaide and his only son, Walter Sidney Palethorpe (b.1900) took over as chairman of the Kidman empire.

The Kidman Tree of Knowledge has been described as "one of the state's most famous living monuments to the king". It is valued by both the local community and visitors as a tangible link with Sir Sidney Kidman, a pioneer who successfully created a pastoral empire in the vast remote interior of Australia, encompassing approximately 3.5% of the Australian continent.

== Description ==
Kidman's Tree of Knowledge is situated on Glengyle Station on the western bank of Eyre Creek, about 60 kilometres (37 mi) south of Bedourie.

It is located in the centre of a grassed square formed by Glengyle homestead and associated buildings and is healthy and mature.

== Heritage listing ==
Kidman's Tree of Knowledge was listed on the Queensland Heritage Register on 21 October 1992 having satisfied the following criteria.

The place is important in demonstrating the evolution or pattern of Queensland's history.

For the many people who worked for Sir Sidney Kidman and for those who continue to be associated with Kidman Holdings, Kidman's Tree of Knowledge on Glengyle Station is significant for its association with Sir Sidney Kidman.For local people and visitors alike Kidman's tree of Knowledge is a tangible link with Sir Sidney Kidman, a pioneer who is recognised as having created a successful pastoral empire in the vast remote interior of Australia in the late 19th and early 20th centuries. The Tree of Knowledge is significant for its association with prominent Australian pastoralist Sir Sidney Kidman, who through business acumen, knowledge of the land he traversed and hard work, acquired a string of pastoral runs in the Australian interior (in Queensland, New South Wales, Northern Territory and Western Australia), where his stock could be moved from property to property to withstand the impact of drought. Whether Sir Sidney Kidman sat under this coolibah tree near the Glengyle homestead is not known. It is, however, the perception or mythology of Kidman's association with this tree that is significant.

The place has a strong or special association with a particular community or cultural group for social, cultural or spiritual reasons.

For the many people who worked for Sir Sidney Kidman and for those who continue to be associated with Kidman Holdings, Kidman's Tree of Knowledge on Glengyle Station is significant for its association with Sir Sidney Kidman.For local people and visitors alike Kidman's tree of Knowledge is a tangible link with Sir Sidney Kidman, a pioneer who is recognised as having created a successful pastoral empire in the vast remote interior of Australia in the late 19th and early 20th centuries.

The place has a special association with the life or work of a particular person, group or organisation of importance in Queensland's history.

The Tree of Knowledge is significant for its association with prominent Australian pastoralist Sir Sidney Kidman, who through business acumen, knowledge of the land he traversed and hard work, acquired a string of pastoral runs in the Australian interior (in Queensland, New South Wales, Northern Territory and Western Australia), where his stock could be moved from property to property to withstand the impact of drought. Whether Sir Sidney Kidman sat under this coolibah tree near the Glengyle homestead is not known. It is, however, the perception or mythology of Kidman's association with this tree that is significant.

== See also ==
- List of individual trees
