= Royal Hotel, Birdsville =

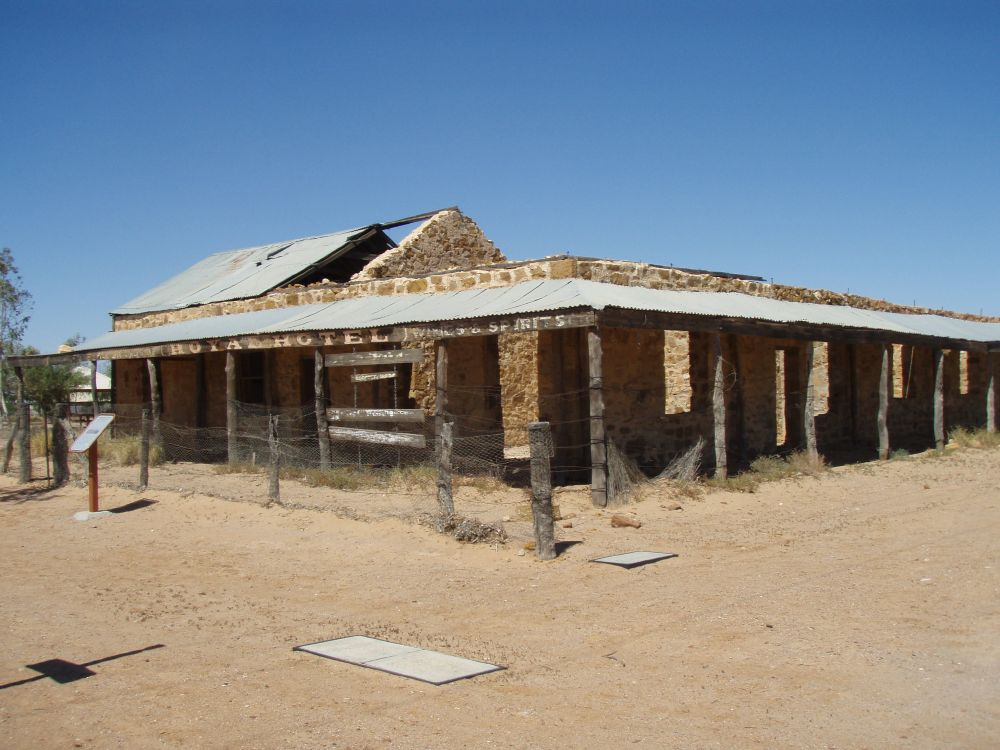
- Royal Hotel ruins, 2008

- Location within Queensland
- 25.8986°S 139.3542°E
- Location: Adelaide Street, Birdsville, Shire of Diamantina, Queensland, Australia

History
- Design period: 1870s–1890s (late 19th century)
- Built: c. 1883

Queensland Heritage Register
- Official name: Royal Hotel/Australian Inland Mission Hospital (former), AIM Hostel, Birdsville Nursing Home
- Type: state heritage (built)
- Designated: 21 October 1992
- Reference no.: 600459
- Significant period: 1880s (fabric); 1880s–1930s (historical)
- Significant components: signage – advertising

Royal Hotel is a heritage-listed former hotel, former hospital and now ruin at Adelaide Street, Birdsville, Shire of Diamantina, Queensland, Australia. It was built c. 1883. It was later known as Australian Inland Mission Hospital, AIM Hostel, and Birdsville Nursing Home. It was added to the Queensland Heritage Register on 21 October 1992.

== History ==
This singled-storeyed sandstone building is thought to have been erected c. 1883 as the Royal Hotel, Birdsville.

Although European explorers had passed through the Diamantina district in the 1840s and early 1860s, pastoralists did not occupy this semi-arid region until the mid-1870s when a number of pastoral runs were established. In the early 1880s the towns of Birdsville and Bedourie were established to service the newly taken up pastoral holdings of the Diamantina. Birdsville is reputed to have sprung up around a rough depot constructed by general merchant Matthew Flynn in the late 1870s at the site of the present town. It was then known as the Diamantina Crossing and was on the stock route from Boulia south to Adelaide. By mid-1885, when the township of Birdsville was officially surveyed, a number of buildings had already been erected including a police lock-up (1883), Groth's Royal Hotel (c. 1883), Blair's Birdsville Hotel (c. 1883), Curtain's Tattersalls Hotel, and at least 3 stores and a shop. Diamantina Shire was established in 1883, and its headquarters were at Birdsville until moved to Bedourie in 1953.

The name Birdsville was not adopted until the 1885 survey, and is thought to have been suggested by Robert Frew, owner of Pandie Pandie Station, who also had a store and shop at the Diamantina Crossing, in reference to the profuse bird life of the district. The township, over 1,000 miles (1,600 km) west of Brisbane and 7 miles (11 km) north of the Queensland-South Australian border, developed as an administrative centre for police and border customs. Nearly all the trade of the town was with Adelaide, and it became an important marshalling point for cattle being driven south to markets in South Australia. By 1889 the population of Birdsville was 110, and the town had 2 general stores, 3 hotels, a police station, school, 2 blacksmith shops, 2 bakers, a cordial manufacturer, bootmaker, saddler, auctioneer & commission agent, and a number of residences. The population peaked in 1895 at 220.

Almost all the buildings in the town were of local sandstone, there being no local timber available. Distance and the lack of good access roads or a railway created prohibitively high transportation costs, so imported building materials were kept to a minimum. Architecturally, the old stone buildings of Birdsville reflect the associations of the town with the entire central "strip" of the Australian continent. Similar buildings are found as far south as Robe in South Australia and as far north as Boulia in Queensland. They are of significance for their illustration of a vernacular style that spread throughout central Australia, across South Australia, the Northern Territory and Queensland. The origin of the style is unknown, but the architectural characteristics are immediately identifiable: built of locally quarried stone with wide verandahs, they efficiently control the extremes of temperature in the hot arid interior of the continent.

The earliest section of the Royal Hotel is likely to have been constructed in 1883, as the first license for this hotel was issued to Alfred William Tucker in that year. In 1885 Tucker transferred the license to Johann H Groth, and on the official survey plan of 1885, the building is marked as Groth's hotel. On 25 January 1886, Groth secured his holding by the purchase of the allotment on which the hotel was located, for £260, and the unimproved allotment adjoining this to the south, for £10. Each block comprised 2 roods. Title to both blocks passed from Groth in 1898, but the building continued to function as a hotel under several proprietors and licensees until the early 1920s. Mrs Alice Maude Scott was the licensee and later owner from c. 1908 until at least 1920, when title passed to Harry Afford, station manager of Birdsville.

From 1923 to 1937, the Royal Hotel buildings were leased by the Presbyterian Australian Inland Mission (AIM) as their first bush nursing home, or hostel. It was staffed by two nursing sisters, the first two arriving in September 1923. At that time the main building consisted of 6 rooms and was unfurnished. A 1926 photograph shows that parts of two walls of a stone shed at the rear of the hostel had collapsed by this date, and was nicknamed the "Hole in the Wall Hospital Store". A c. 1927 photograph shows an old shed of corrugated iron also at the rear of the main hostel building.

At that period the AIM was headed by the Rev. Dr John Flynn, who was working toward establishing a flying doctor and air ambulance service for remote central Australia. Such a service could only operate efficiently if it could be contacted quickly, so Flynn experimented with radio as a means of communicating between isolated station properties, the Mission's string of bush hostels (ultimately 13), and the flying doctor/air ambulance. In 1925 he undertook various radio experiments throughout central Australia, including an early attempt at receiving/transmitting from the AIM Hostel in Birdsville. However, it was not until 1929, with Alfred Traeger's invention of the pedal radio, that reliable radio communications were possible for the bush. In September 1929, Traeger installed at the AIM's Birdsville Hostel one of 6 experimental "transceivers" linked to pedal generators, the others being placed at 4 head stations in far western Queensland and at the Aboriginal Mission at Mornington Island, with base station VJI established at Cloncurry. For the first 18 months, communication was by Morse code, but the system proved enormously popular, and soon revolutionised outback communications. Importantly, Birdsville became reliably connected to the station properties in the Diamantina district, and with the new Aerial Medical Service, established by Flynn in 1928 under the auspices of the AIM, and based at Cloncurry.

In 1934, nursing sisters Edna McLean and Amy Bishop of the AIM's Birdsville Hostel introduced a system of early morning radio calls to the station women in the Diamantina district who had access to radio. It proved highly popular, and although indecorously dubbed the "Galah Session", is credited with being Australia's first radio talk-back program. Birdsville VKK became the "Voice of the Diamantina Country". In 1937 the AIM relinquished the former Royal Hotel premises in Birdsville and moved to a new, purpose-designed hostel (the Australian Inland Mission Hospital, Birdsville) just down the road. The old sandstone building was subsequently used for residential purposes, then abandoned, and later partially collapsed. Some restoration work was carried out in 1984, when sections of the collapsed walls were partly reconstructed. Further substantial stabilisation and restoration work was undertaken in 1994.

== Description ==
The site occupies an area of approximately 0.2 hectares and is located on the southeast corner of Adelaide and Frew Streets in Birdsville. It faces Adelaide Street, the main street in town, along a 40-metre (130 ft) frontage.

The hotel complex was at some period substantially larger than is indicated by the remaining buildings on the site. Remnants of the footings of some earlier stone buildings are in evidence, as is an unusual paving of upturned stoneware bottles. There is also some evidence of footings of timber structures on the site.

The remaining building on the site is a single-storeyed, L-shaped stone structure roofed partially with corrugated iron. It has corrugated iron roofed verandahs supported on bush timber posts on the two street elevations. There is some evidence that an earlier verandah was attached to the building face by a timber plate fixed to the stone walling. A false fascia wired to the verandah bressumer shows evidence of original sign writing. On the north fascia this reads: Best Brands - ROYAL HOTEL- Ales, Wines, Spirits, etc. On the west fascia part of the word ROYAL can be deciphered. Despite the collapse of parts of this structure, the original planning and detail remains. It is possible to locate original door and window openings and to determine original finishes, fittings and detail and to deduce the stages in which the building may be been constructed. Walls are laid either as random rubble, or as squared rubble built to courses, both of which use an exceptionally soft mortar. The walls are rendered internally and may also have been rendered externally at some period.

To the south of the main building are the remains of footings of a stone building originally attached to the main structure by a covered way. To the east are remnants of a further extension of the large room to the southern wing. At the eastern side of the site are footings of a series of stone cellular structures which may have been an accommodation wing.

Closer to the main building is evidence of a more recent small timber and corrugated iron structure, which may have been a bathroom.

== Heritage listing ==
The former Royal Hotel was listed on the Queensland Heritage Register on 21 October 1992 having satisfied the following criteria.

The place is important in demonstrating the evolution or pattern of Queensland's history.

The former Royal Hotel at Birdsville, erected c. 1883, survives as an important link with the earliest pastoral settlement in the Diamantina district of far western Queensland. As the Australian Inland Mission's Nursing Home from 1923 to 1937, it has national significance as the first in a string of such bush hospitals in central Australia and is associated with the earliest outback radio communication and the provision of the Flying Doctor Service. Such medical facilities revolutionised life in remote central Australia in the 1920s and 1930s.

The place demonstrates rare, uncommon or endangered aspects of Queensland's cultural heritage.

The former Royal Hotel/Australian Inland Mission Hospital is one of only three surviving masonry buildings in Birdsville, the others being the Birdsville Hotel and the police station and courthouse. These contribute significantly to the historic character of the town which, in the last quarter of the 20th century, became a major Queensland tourist attraction.

The place is important in demonstrating the principal characteristics of a particular class of cultural places.

It is important in illustrating the principal characteristics of a vernacular style of masonry construction that spread throughout central Australia, across South Australia, the Northern Territory and Queensland in the late 19th century, efficiently controlling the extremes of temperature in the hot, arid interior of the continent, and compensating for the lack of locally available timber.

As the former Royal Hotel, the place has the potential, through archaeological and documentary research, to reveal important information about the design, form and function of far western Queensland hotel complexes of this period, and about the people who erected such buildings.

The place is important because of its aesthetic significance.

In form and detail it has aesthetic qualities valued by the community and is important in defining the Birdsville townscape.
