= Carcory Homestead Ruin =

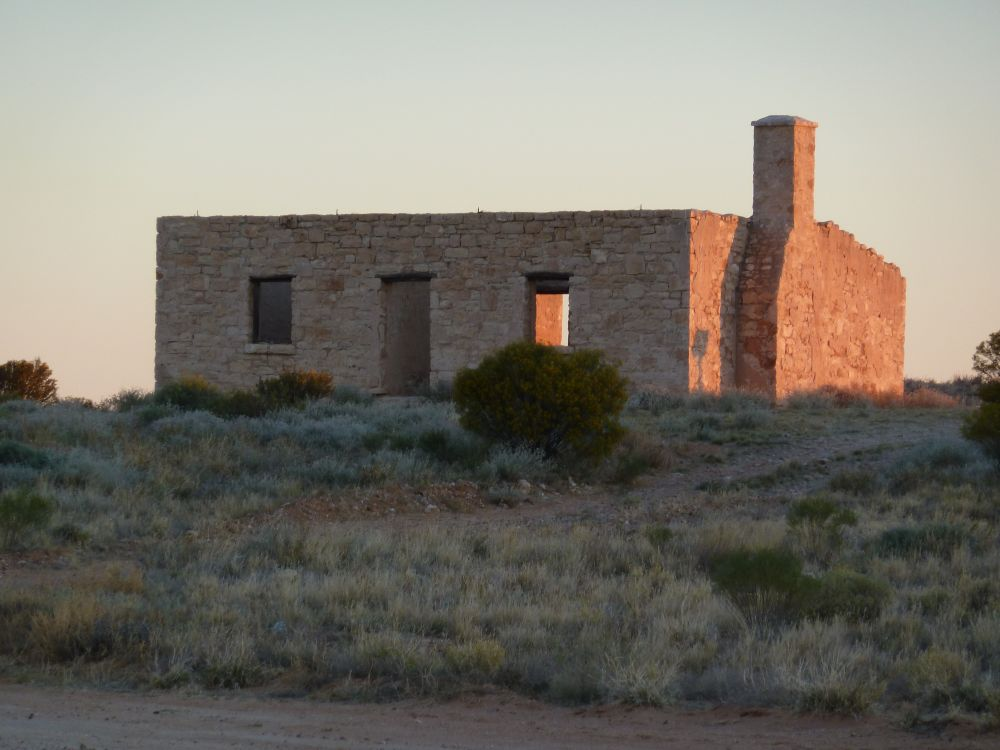
- Carcory Homestead Ruin, from the North, 2011

- Location within Queensland
- 25.2377°S 139.5632°E
- Location: Eyre Developmental Road, Birdsville, Shire of Diamantina, Queensland, Australia

History
- Design period: 1870s–1890s (late 19th century)
- Built: c. 1870–c. 1900

Queensland Heritage Register
- Official name: Carcory Homestead Ruin
- Type: state heritage (archaeological, landscape)
- Designated: 21 October 1992
- Reference no.: 600458
- Significant period: 1870s–1900s (historical); 1870s–1900s (fabric)
- Significant components: yards – livestock, chimney/chimney stack, ruin/s, wall/s

Carcory Homestead Ruin is a heritage-listed former homestead and now ruins on the Eyre Developmental Road, Birdsville, Shire of Diamantina, Queensland, Australia. It was built from c. 1870 to c. 1900. It was added to the Queensland Heritage Register on 21 October 1992.

== History ==
The Carcory Homestead Ruin (also spelt as Carcoory and Cacoory) is a roofless stone structure located on the northern end of Roseberth Station, eighty kilometres north of Birdsville.

Thomas Mitchell made the first exploration of the area in which Carcory Homestead is located in 1845. Explorers Burke and Wills made further investigations in 1861, and it was while searching for them that intensive exploration of the region was first undertaken. In the 1870s, this region comprised some of the last land taken over by settlers, in Queensland.

The land on which Carcory Homestead is located was taken up in 1877 as a pastoral run by brothers Hector and Norman Wilson. The Wilsons were from a well known family of squatters based in Victoria, their uncle being Sir Samuel Wilson. Hector and Norman were in a business partnership and their other properties included Coongy and Currawinya. The brothers were also notable for being the driving force behind the establishment of the Melbourne Racing Club and the Caulfield Cup.

Buildings of a similar construction are found in Central Australia as far south as Robe in South Australia and as far north as Boulia in Queensland. They are of significance for their illustration of a vernacular style that spread throughout central Australia, across South Australia, the Northern Territory and Queensland. The origin of the style is unknown, but the architectural characteristics are immediately identifiable: built of stone with wide verandahs, they efficiently control the extremes of temperature in the hot arid interior of the continent. Where no local timber was available, and distance and the lack of good access roads or a railway created prohibitively high transportation costs.

The homestead was positioned near Carcory Waterhole and the major stock route through Birdsville. It consisted of two main rooms under a hipped roof, probably used as a bedroom and a living room with a chimney, and a skillion-roofed second bedroom and store forming wings to the rear. It had an awning supported by posts at the front and was built of blocks of local limestone rendered inside and out. A stone store and kitchen were also built to the west of the house.

Around the turn of the century, Sidney Kidman, a pastoralist of humble beginnings who by 1890 owned stations stretching from the Gulf of Carpentaria almost to Adelaide, took up the Carcory Run, comprising one thousand square miles. Between 1900 and 1903, the region suffered severe drought conditions and the entire stock of 4000 bullocks perished. After visiting the station in 1902, Kidman decided to close it down, reputedly allowing the mailman to reside in the homestead for eighteen months. When Kidman returned, the place was abandoned and without a roof. The contents were then removed to Annandale Station.

In 1936 a Mr Morton, father of a subsequent owner, took up Carcory. At this stage the building was in a ruinous condition and it is believed that most recoverable materials were removed from the site for use at Glengyle Station following the First World War.

The building suffered from the effects of the harsh climate and from damage by vandals. The chimney collapsed in about 1992. In 1994 a Queensland Heritage Grant was obtained to allow repair work to be carried out on the remains of the homestead building. The building has been stabilised as a ruin. The roof has not been replaced.

== Description ==
Carcory Homestead comprises the shell of a cottage constructed of limestone, also evident in the surrounding landscape. It is located 100 metres (330 ft) to the east of the Birdsville-Bedourie Road 80 kilometres (50 mi) north of Birdsville.

The walls are constructed of squared rubble, approximately 45 centimetres (18 in) thick, rendered and scribed externally to imitate ashlar. A stone chimney remains at the northern end. The front (eastern) wall is of unrendered stone with irregular pointing. The window, doors and corners of this wall are rendered to resemble stone quoins.

Internally, the walls are plastered and floors are of concrete. The remains of a fireplace, window frames and doorframe heads are evident. Piles of stones on the western side of the homestead building may be the remains of outbuildings. Evidence also exists of cattle yards approximately seventy-five metres further west.

== Heritage listing ==
Carcory Homestead Ruin was listed on the Queensland Heritage Register on 21 October 1992 having satisfied the following criteria.

The place is important in demonstrating the evolution or pattern of Queensland's history.

The Carcory Homestead Ruin in far southwest Queensland survives as an important link with early European settlement in this region and as an isolated ruin is demonstrative of the hardships experienced by early settlers. Carcory was established in 1877 as a pastoral run and the homestead ruin demonstrates the development of Queensland by pastoral settlement, later instrumental in the formation of towns.

The place demonstrates rare, uncommon or endangered aspects of Queensland's cultural heritage.

The Carcory ruin is a rare surviving example of an early homestead in this area.

The place has potential to yield information that will contribute to an understanding of Queensland's history.

Due to the undeveloped nature of the place, Carcory Homestead Ruin has the potential to yield information through documentary and archaeological research that will contribute to an understanding of Queensland's history.

The place is important in demonstrating the principal characteristics of a particular class of cultural places.

The Carcory ruin is a rare surviving example of an early homestead in this area and is valuable as an example of a vernacular style of masonry construction that spread throughout central Australia, across South Australia, the Northern Territory and Queensland in the late 19th century. It efficiently controlled the extremes of temperature in the hot, arid interior of the continent and compensated for the lack of locally available timber.

The place is important because of its aesthetic significance.

Carcory Homestead Ruin has aesthetic appeal, derived partly from its form and materials and partly from its setting as an isolated structure in a broad, open landscape. The ruinous state of the homestead complements the desolation of the place.

The place has a strong or special association with a particular community or cultural group for social, cultural or spiritual reasons.

Carcory Homestead Ruin has a special association with the community as one of the earliest homesteads in the District.
