= Australian Inland Mission Hospital, Birdsville =

Australian Inland Mission Hospital
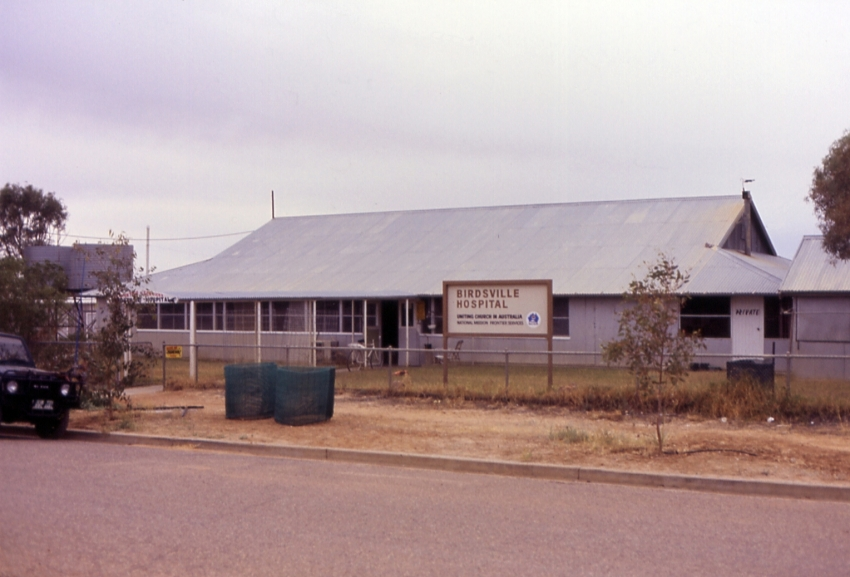
- Australian Inland Mission Hospital, 2007

- Location within Queensland
- 25.8978°S 139.3551°E
- Location: Adelaide Street, Birdsville, Shire of Diamantina, Queensland, Australia

History
- Design period: 1940s–1960s (post-World War II)
- Built: 1952–1953

Queensland Heritage Register
- Official name: Australian Inland Mission Hospital (former)
- Type: state heritage (built)
- Designated: 17 July 2008
- Reference no.: 602635
- Significant period: 1953–2005
- Significant components: hospital
- Builders: Ben Hargreaves

Australian Inland Mission Hospital is a heritage-listed former hospital at Adelaide Street, Birdsville, Shire of Diamantina, Queensland, Australia. It was built from 1952 to 1953 by Ben Hargreaves. It was added to the Queensland Heritage Register on 17 July 2008.

== History ==
Located in Adelaide Street, Birdsville, the single-storeyed, prefabricated steel, Australian Inland Mission Hospital building was erected in 1952–1953 on the site of its predecessor, which burnt down in November 1951. An Australian Inland Mission bush nursing home or hostel was established at Birdsville in 1923 in the former Royal Hotel building, the first mission hostel in Queensland and the seventh in Australia. It was replaced by a purpose-built, pre-fabricated hospital opened in 1937 on land purchased by the Presbyterian Church.

Although European explorers had passed through the Diamantina district in the 1840s and early 1860s, this semi-arid region was not occupied until the mid-1870s when a number of pastoral runs were established. In the early 1880s the towns of Birdsville and Bedourie developed to service the newly taken-up pastoral holdings of the Diamantina. Birdsville, known originally as the Diamantina Crossing, is reputed to have sprung up around a rough depot constructed by general merchant Matthew Flynn in the late 1870s on the stock route from Boulia south to Adelaide. It became the headquarters of Diamantina Shire when the shire was established in 1883. The township was officially surveyed by mid-1885 and the name Birdsville adopted in reference to the profuse bird life of the district. Located over 1,000 miles (1,600 km) west of Brisbane and 7 miles (11 km) north of the Queensland-South Australian border, Birdsville developed as an administrative centre for police and border customs. Nearly all the trade of the town was with Adelaide, and it became an important marshalling point for cattle being driven south to markets in South Australia. Due to the lack of local timber, the town's remoteness and the lack of good access by roads or rail, which created prohibitively high transportation costs, almost all the town's early buildings were built of local sandstone. The population peaked in 1895 at 220.

The Presbyterian Australian Inland Mission (AIM) leased the Royal Hotel buildings (erected from c. 1883) from 1923 to 1937 as their first bush nursing home, or hostel in Queensland. At that time the AIM was headed by its founder Rev. Dr John Flynn, who was working toward establishing a flying doctor and air ambulance service for remote central Australia (now known as the Royal Flying Doctor Service). Such a service could only operate efficiently if it could be contacted quickly, which became possible in 1929, with Alfred Traeger's invention of the pedal radio. In August 1929 Traeger installed at the AIM's Birdsville Hostel one of six experimental pedal radios, the others being placed at four head stations in far western Queensland and at the Aboriginal Mission at Mornington Island, with base station VJI established at Cloncurry. The system revolutionised outback communications. Importantly, Birdsville became reliably connected to the station properties in the Diamantina district and with the new Aerial Medical Service, established by Flynn in 1928 under the auspices of the AIM and based at Cloncurry.

By 1930 the Royal Hotel building needed extensive repairs and the AIM decided to erect a purpose-built hospital - more modest than the masonry hospitals erected at Victoria River Downs Station (circa 1923), Innamincka (1923) and Alice Springs (1926). AIM hospitals, previously intended to become district hospitals, changed in purpose after the advent of the flying doctor. Their function changed to that of first-aid posts, with serious cases being evacuated to larger centres. The Birdsville Hospital took years to eventuate. It was not until April 1937 that the purchase of land for the project at the eastern end of Adelaide Street, the main street of Birdsville, was completed. Flynn decided on a pre-fabricated building, designed for the arid conditions, to function as a community house and public hall as well as a hospital. The hospital opened in December 1937, and a separate Aboriginal ward, a simple transverse gabled building with corrugated iron cladding and roof over a steel frame, was added before 1951.

On 10 November 1951 the AIM Hospital at Birdsville was destroyed by fire thought to be caused when a kerosene refrigerator blew up. Only the Aboriginal ward was spared, but there were no deaths. Within days of the disaster the Charleville Flying Doctor Base flew out medical supplies and rigged an emergency transceiver and aerial to restore communications, while Rev. Les McKay of the AIM Western Queensland Patrol drove from Burketown to begin salvage operations. The ruins of the burnt building were dismantled and temporary accommodation erected out of salvaged material so that services could continue. An emergency hospital was set up in the two small rooms of the Aboriginal ward and a bough shed was constructed adjoining it.

Local people started a subscription for a replacement hospital and a re-building fund appeal was organised to the £10,000 required. Donations of £100 came from each of the Kidman cattle stations in the area and many other donors Australia-wide. Queensland's Minister for Health promised a pound for pound subsidy, thereby ensuring the project proceeded.

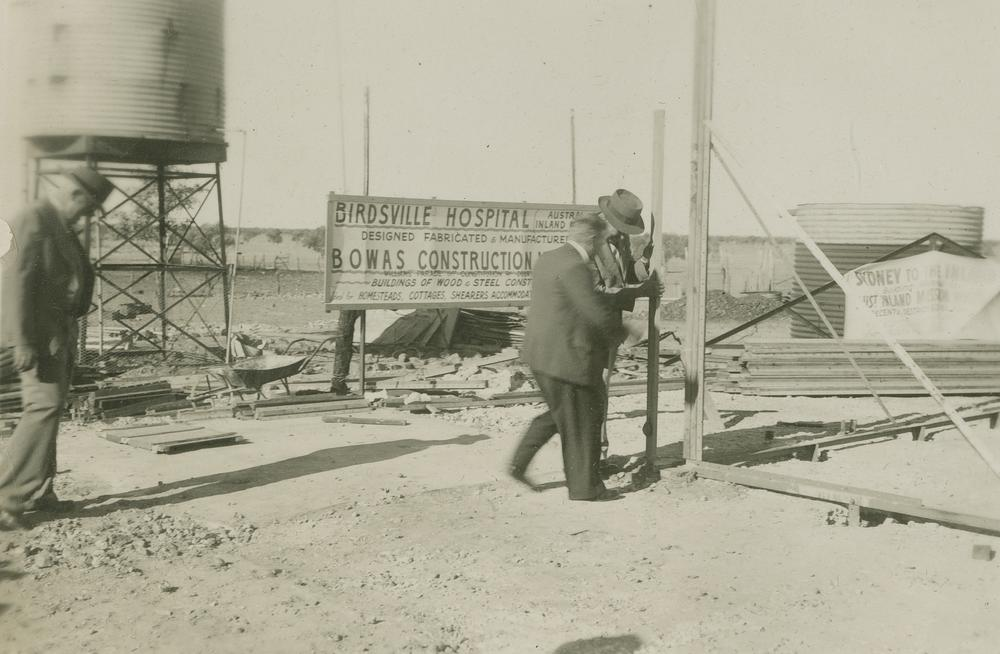
Governor Sir John Lavarack setting the corner post, 1952

In February 1952 a prefabricated steel building was ordered from the Sidney Williams factory in Sydney. The materials were transported from Sydney by road to Birdsville via Broken Hill, Marree and the Birdsville track, a 2,000-mile (3,200 km) journey. The Rev. Les McKay spent a year in Birdsville assisting with the re-building. The Queensland Governor, John Lavarack, visited Birdsville for the first time in June 1952 to set the corner post.

Ben Hargreaves, builder of the 1937 AIM hospital at Birdsville, came out of retirement to undertake construction of the 1952 building. A skilled cabinetmaker with outback experience, he constructed the building and made most of the original furniture and fittings, such as cupboards and tables on site, using North Queensland silky oak. Other furniture was of tubular steel, regarded as ideal for bush conditions, while canvas deck chairs lined the front verandah. These were used by outpatients and also for open-air movie shows, church services and other gatherings. Some of the furnishings and equipment were donated for instance, the dispensary was equipped by the Society of St Andrew, Brisbane and the Adelaide pharmaceutical company, Fauldings, gave £100 worth of drugs.

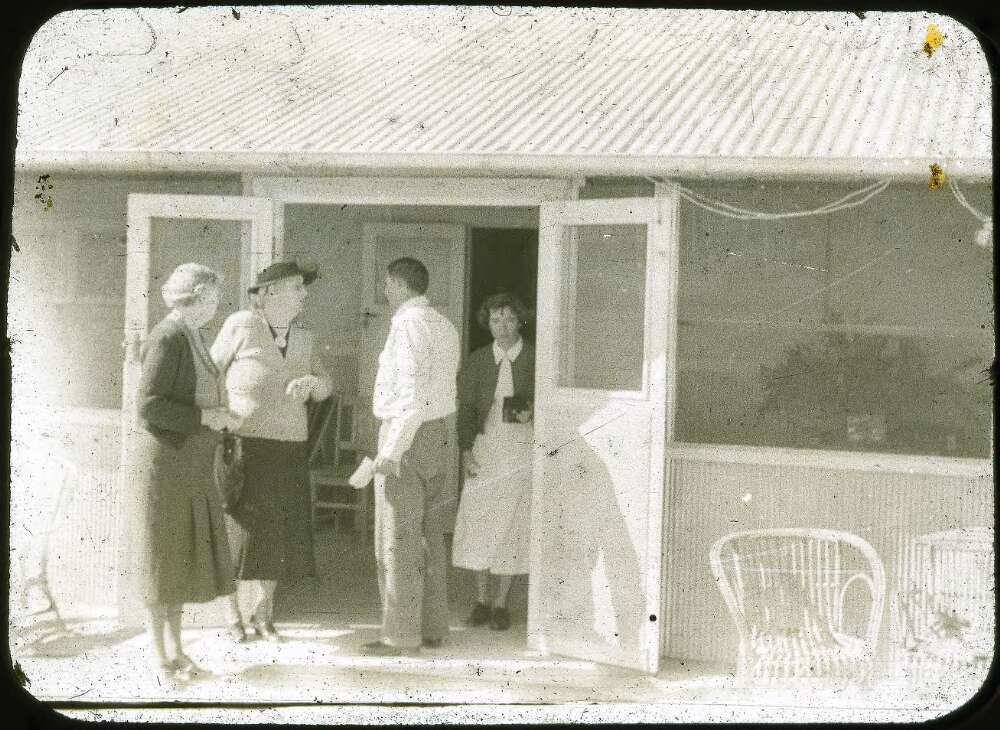
Reverend Fred McKay welcoming guests at the opening of the new Australian Inland Mission Hospital, 1953

The new hospital was opened on 5 August 1953, having cost £15,000. The opening was a community event for the Diamantina Shire and beyond. The gala event was accompanied by a two-day race meeting and a dance, and attracted the largest crowd the town had ever seen. The opening and dramatic events preceding it were recorded in the movie Diamantina Drama, one of several films produced by the AIM. A reporter from Brisbane's Courier-Mail attended and the ABC broadcast the event in their news the next day, referring to it as "the miracle at Birdsville".

As with the former building, the plan incorporated a large central room (pavilion) suitable for public gatherings. The plan and footprint generally followed that of the former building, except that a central entrance has replaced two former front porches. Other rooms include a dispensary, two wards men's and women's, the latter used by the nursing sisters or visitors when not needed for patients; a wireless room-cum lounge with an open fireplace, that once housed the transceiver and a circulating library for the use of local people; a large kitchen with floor to ceiling cupboards and an adjoining pantry; bathrooms, toilets and sisters' accommodation.

Sidney Williams & Co, which prefabricated both the 1937 and 1952 AIM hospitals, was a well-known steel fabrication business. Originally based in Rockhampton, it was active in the prefabrication of metal buildings from the 1890s. The Company began to expand rapidly around the time of the development of its Comet Windmill (c. 1910) with branches established in Brisbane and Townsville. In 1922 the Company opened a new factory in Sydney which led to the closure of the Brisbane and Rockhampton Works. During World War II the company prefabricated large numbers of "huts" for the defence forces. The company also established hundreds of offices and agencies throughout Australia to distribute and service its product. A subsidiary of the company, BOWAS, was established in 1950 as a result of the significant building component of the company's operations. This company ceased trading in 1976.

From as early as the late 1890s the company was involved in designing, manufacturing and erecting steel-framed buildings for many purposes including rural and town uses. The company promoted their buildings as being white ant proof, fire proof, hygienic, long lasting and easily dismantled and erected on another site. Their so-called "ordinary buildings" were those individually designed to meet the specific client's needs. The whole of the frame was erected in the factory yard with all the joints being marked. The structure was then dismantled and packaged for shipment to the site for re-erection. There was extensive use of their locally-manufactured, prefabricated metal buildings throughout the hot, sparsely populated areas of pastoral Queensland and the Northern Territory. Buildings prefabricated by this company included: hangars; Sidney Williams Huts; the Supreme Court complex in Darwin; Christ the King Catholic Church at Tennant Creek; dormitory and school accommodation on Croker Island; and AIM hospitals at Tennant Creek (pre-1937) and at Dunbar on Cape York Peninsula (c. 1953).

Additional buildings were added to the Birdsville Hospital site over time. The main building was surrounded by a series of detached buildings, including the Aboriginal ward, laundry, electric light plant house (the later two made from materials salvaged from the former hospital building), goat pen, chook house and Old Timers' cottages. These cottages were built in 1963, to accommodate elderly bushmen who wanted to spend their final years in retirement in the precincts of the town. One of these Old Timers' cottages was named the Francis Cottage after Grace Francis, one of the first AIM nurses in Birdsville. Towering behind the building was a tall radio aerial and a windmill, the latter used to generate electricity.

Following the creation of the Uniting Church in Australia in the 1970s, the work of the Presbyterian Australian Inland Mission, the Methodist Inland Mission and the Home Mission of the Congregational Church, was amalgamated as the Uniting Church in Australia Frontier Services. From 1977 to 2005 the Birdsville AIM Hospital was operated by Frontier Services.

Like all AIM hospitals, Birdsville's was intended eventually to be handed over to local control. In 2005 the Australian Inland Mission Hospital at Birdsville closed, after serving as a hospital for 53 years. Its function was taken over by the Diamantina Shire Council, which built a clinic on adjacent land provided by the Uniting Church Frontier Services. The former AIM Hospital remains the property of The Uniting Church in Australia Property Trust (Qld), which holds the land and buildings in trust for Frontier Services, but is now open to the public as the "Old Birdsville Hospital historical display".

== Description ==
Located at the eastern end of the main street of Birdsville, Adelaide Street, the former Australian Inland Mission Hospital site comprises the hospital building, former Aboriginal ward, "billiard room", water tanks, shed and new padre cottage. Of these, the hospital building, former Aboriginal ward and above ground corrugated iron tank and the in-ground concrete water tank are significant.

The north-west facing hospital building is a rectangular structure with a gabled hip roof and is surrounded on three sides by enclosed verandahs. It is constructed on a steel frame with corrugated iron external walls, ripple iron verandah linings, Oregon pine joists and rafters, masonite and tilux internal walls, and caneite ceilings. The foundations and floors are concrete, with linoleum covering most internal floors.

The hospital was designed especially for the inland. Ceilings are well insulated and low to afford maximum space between the ceiling and the iron roof, while air vents in the gables provide roof ventilation. Verandah ceilings have a gap at the eaves to permit air flow. The building is equipped with a cool storage cellar under the kitchen, an underground tank for rain (drinking) water and an above ground tank for town water, which was previously drawn from the Diamantina River and now from an artesian bore. On the roof at the rear of the building is a communications aerial.

Entrance is central, via a covered walkway from the front gate onto the enclosed verandah that is built-in at both ends. Central French doors lead into a chapel. On the chapel's left hand side are two wards, both with single door access onto the front verandah. On the right hand side of the chapel are a pantry and an L-shaped kitchen. From the kitchen, stairs lead to the cellar. Double doors through a partition wall lead from the kitchen to the central pavilion. At the eastern end of the pavilion are three rooms designated as nurses' quarters with a common lounge room on the southern side of the pavilion. Western and southern verandahs have been enclosed to accommodate bathrooms and cupboards, while a cold room is located near the kitchen on the northern end of the western verandah. On the eastern end of the northern verandah a bathroom has been added.

The former Aboriginal ward is located at the rear of the former hospital near the property's south-east boundary. This corrugated iron-clad, steel-framed, gable-roofed building consists of an open verandah, two wards and an enclosed rear verandah along the long axis of the building, approximately east-west. Hinged, corrugated iron shutters cover the window openings.

Other buildings on the site include a separate gabled building on the north-west corner of the former hospital, now used as a billiard room; a new Padre Cottage; and an iron-clad shed used for storage and containing toilet facilities. These are not regarded as significant being relatively new structures. Other outbuildings have been demolished.

== Heritage listing ==
The former Australian Inland Mission Hospital was listed on the Queensland Heritage Register on 17 July 2008 having satisfied the following criteria.

The place is important in demonstrating the evolution or pattern of Queensland's history.

The former Australian Inland Mission (AIM) Hospital at Birdsville, demonstrates the continued presence and importance of the AIM to inland Queensland from the establishment of its first Queensland hospital in Birdsville in 1923 (the seventh of its hospitals Australia-wide). The services provided by the Birdsville Hospital were an important component of the AIM's objective of providing a "mantle of safety" for residents of inland Australia, and this ensured that after a fire destroyed its predecessor in 1951 this hospital replaced it.

The place demonstrates rare, uncommon or endangered aspects of Queensland's cultural heritage.

The former AIM Hospital, Birdsville is a rare example of the AIM hospital service that was established to provide medical aid to the people of remote inland Australia. Of the AIM hospitals built in Queensland at three different locations - Birdsville, Dunbar and Coen, only the Birdsville and Coen hospitals remain.

The place is important in demonstrating the principal characteristics of a particular class of cultural places.

The former AIM Hospital, Birdsville demonstrates the principal characteristics of an AIM hospital viz. a simple building designed for life in inland Australia that comprised wards for patients, a dispensary, kitchen, bathrooms and toilets, and quarters for two nurses including a living room. Under the kitchen was a cellar/basement. Near the hospital were the Aboriginal ward and Old Timers' accommodation and structures necessary to the hospital's operations such as water tanks and communication equipment.

The building is a good example of a Sidney Williams and Co prefabricated building and the company made at least two other AIM hospitals. These buildings were considered ideal for use in remote inland Australia because of ease of transportation and erection, and durability.

The place has a strong or special association with a particular community or cultural group for social, cultural or spiritual reasons.

Located in remote south-western Queensland, the former AIM hospital, Birdsville was a place of essential community function upon which people relied, leading to special attachment not only for the Diamantina Shire community but those living beyond Queensland's border. The significance of its community association is evidenced by the Australia-wide fund-raising campaign and subsequent attendance and interest in the building's opening in 1953. The opening was witnessed not only by shire residents, but also by media from Brisbane and filmed by Fox Movietone for the documentary "Diamantina Drama". The hospital served as a health facility for 52 years.

The place has a special association with the life or work of a particular person, group or organisation of importance in Queensland's history.

The former AIM Hospital, Birdsville has a special association with the Presbyterian Church's Australian Inland Mission founded by the Rev. Dr John Flynn, which has made an important contribution to the development of medical and community services to inland Queensland since 1923. For 52 years this hospital provided medical services to remote Queensland communities in conjunction with the Royal Flying Doctor Service.
