= Alton Downs =

Alton Downs may refer to:

- Alton Downs, Queensland, a locality in the Rockhampton Region, Queensland, Australia
- Alton Downs Station, a pastoral property in South Australia
