= Alton Downs Station =

Cattle station and pastoral lease in South Australia

Coordinates: 26.122°S 138.94°E

Location in South Australia

Alton Downs Station, most commonly known simply as Alton Downs, is a pastoral lease that operates as a cattle station in north east South Australia.

The property is situated approximately 48 kilometres (30 mi) south west of Birdsville and 253 kilometres (157 mi) north west of Innamincka. It is bordered to the west by the Simpson Desert Regional reserve, to the south by Clifton Hills Station and to the east by Pandie Pandie Station. The station contains many landforms including gibber plains, sand-plains, floodplains, channels and ephemeral rivers. The Warburton River flows through the property southward through Clifton Hills and Cowarie Station then discharging into Lake Eyre.

== History ==
The property was first taken up by Whittingham in 1878, the same year that Chapman established Cordillo Downs Station. Whittington still owned the property in 1893 but was experiencing financial difficulties with the Bank of Adelaide, of which he was a director.

Sidney Kidman acquired the property in 1897 after he had bought nearby Cowarie Station and about the same time he started to expand further into the Channel Country and purchased Annandale Station.

The station was abandoned sometime early in the 1900s when the area was struck by drought. Other nearby properties including Pandie Pandie, Miranda and Idra Downs had also been abandoned. The country had started to recover from the drought in 1904 and pastoralists in the area had commenced restocking.

The property was found to be practically abandoned in 1927 after the area had been overrun by rabbits.

== Current use ==
The property is currently owned by Brook Proprietors, who also own nearby Cordillo Downs, Murnpeowie, Adria Downs (Queensland) and Kamaran Downs (Queensland) stations. All these holdings are NASAA Certified Organic Livestock operations.

The land occupying the extent of the Alton Downs pastoral lease was gazetted as a locality in April 2013 under the name "Alton Downs Station" with the word "Station" being added to avoid duplication of the name of a locality in Queensland.

== See also ==
- List of ranches and stations
