= Bedourie oven =

Australian oven

The Bedourie oven is a late 19th century Australian adaptation of the camp oven (Dutch oven).

== Origins ==
Following industrialised developments to cast iron within Europe in the 18th century, cast iron cookware had become a desirable commodity due to its high durability and ease of manufacture when compared with earlier production methods. The Dutch oven was a significant and versatile example of this, formed of a cast iron pot with a lid. American settlers developed the Dutch oven further, frequently adding legs and a bucket handle, thus allowing it to be stood or hung over an open fire. The Dutch camp oven is inherently heavy due to the amount of cast iron required, and brittle due to its high carbon content, but its versatility and relative durability led to its widespread adoption among many of Europe's pioneering colonies.

By the end of the 19th century, developments in the technology of metal spinning allowed for the production of similar metalware at scale without the need for cast iron. Drovers working on Bedourie Station, in western Queensland, developed what would become known as the Bedourie oven in response to these improvements. Spun from mild steel, the new oven required much less metal for the same internal volume, so was lighter, and was also far more resistant to shattering due to the low carbon content and lack of hot casting.

== Usage ==
The Bedourie oven was used similarly to the Dutch oven, and so was highly versatile. At its simplest, heat could be provided from below simply by placing it on top of a fire, but when used in conjunction with its lid, coals could also be placed on top of and around the sides of the oven, thus allowing for heat to be provided from all angles. Sources indicate that it was sometimes set into a hole dug in the ground, allowing ashes to be more tightly packed around its sides.

In the 21st century, the Bedourie oven is a popular item of cookware amongst outdoors enthusiasts, although examples are still primarily manufactured and used within Australia. This can be contrasted with the Billycan, another piece of Australian camp cookware that has been adopted internationally amongst outdoors communities.

== Alternative forms ==
While the most common usage of the term Bedourie oven pertains to the round spun steel cookware developed at Bedourie, contemporary sources also sometimes describe methods of cooking with heat from all sides as a "Bedourie oven" more generally. Examples include a nesting set of two oblong steel boxes, with the larger box containing ashes and the smaller box packed amongst them, with cooking being performed within the smallest box.

== See also ==
- Billycan
- Swag (bedroll)
