= Birdsville Hotel =

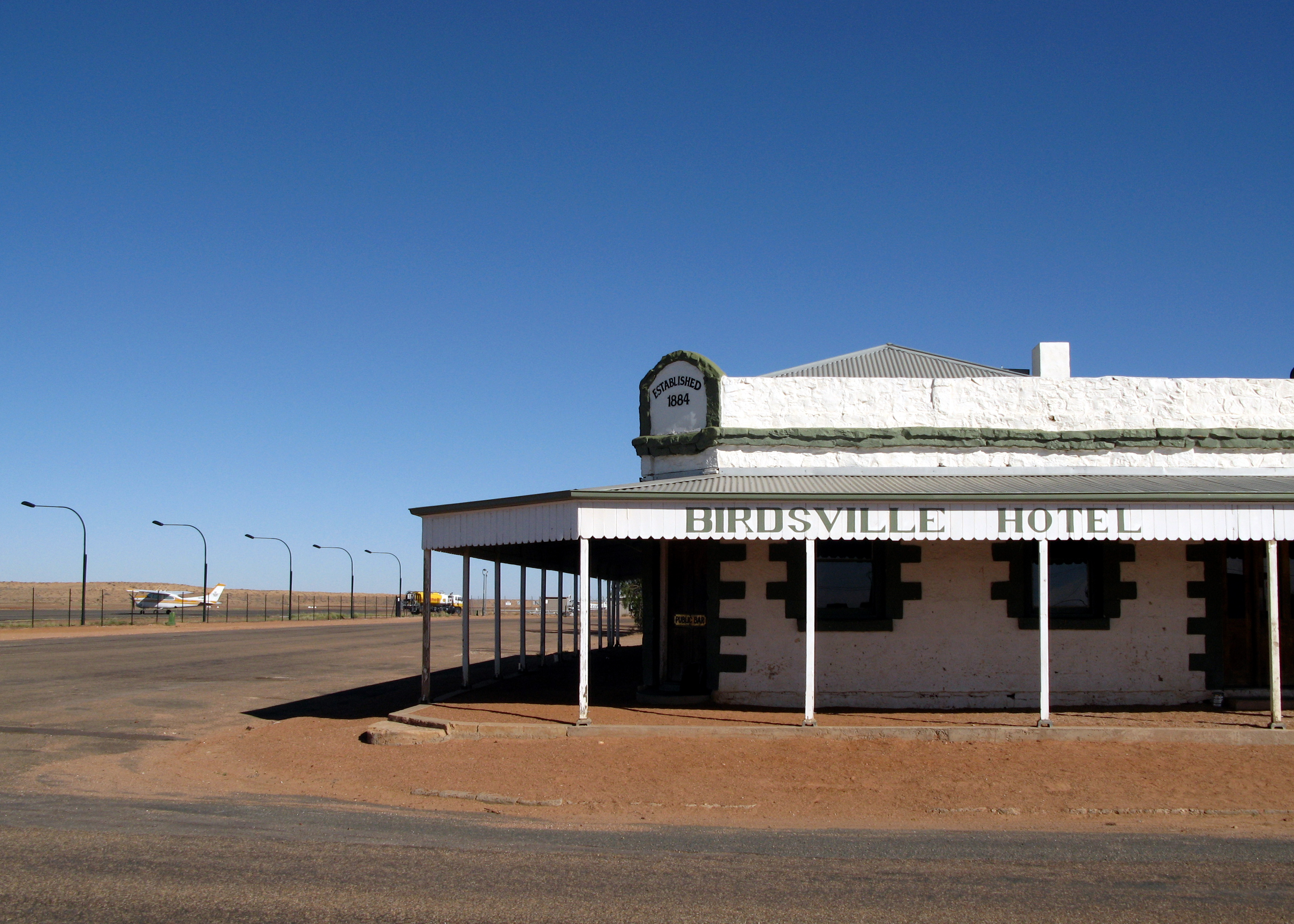
- Birdsville Hotel, 2007

- Location within Queensland
- 25.8985°S 139.3515°E
- Location: Burt Street, Birdsville, Shire of Diamantina, Queensland, Australia

History
- Design period: 1870s–1890s (late 19th century)
- Built: c. 1884

Queensland Heritage Register
- Official name: Birdsville Hotel
- Type: state heritage (built)
- Designated: 21 October 1992
- Reference no.: 600461
- Significant period: 1880s (fabric) c. 1884–ongoing (historical use)

Birdsville Hotel is a heritage-listed hotel at Burt Street, Birdsville, Shire of Diamantina, Queensland, Australia. It was built c. 1884. It was added to the Queensland Heritage Register on 21 October 1992.

== The town ==
Birdsville was known as Diamantina Crossing from the 1870s when a rough depot was set up there by Matthew Flynn. By 1882, the name Birdsville was in common use. Formally adopted in the 1885 survey, the name was formalised in the proclamation of town in 1887.

Many of Australia's pioneering European explorers travelled through Birdsville well before the town was gazetted. Monuments to these explorers, including Captain Charles Sturt, Burke and Wills, and Cecil Madigan, are located throughout the town.

== The hotel ==
The hotel, a singled-storeyed sandstone building, was erected c. 1884 for publican William Blair. The earliest section is likely to have been constructed in 1883 (possibly from stone quarried at a site about 16 kilometres (9.9 mi) from the town), as the first licence for this hotel was issued to William Blair in that year. On the official Birdsville town survey plan of mid-1885, the building is marked as Wm Blair's hotel. On 24 February 1886, Blair purchased from the Crown, for £206, the allotment at the corner of Adelaide and Burt streets which contained the hotel. A month earlier he had bought for £12 the allotment at the rear, which contained a fenced yard and had frontages to Burt & Graham streets; also an unimproved allotment adjacent to this, fronting Graham Street, for £8. Each block comprised 2 roods (22,000 sq ft; 2,000 m^{2}).

Following Blair's death in 1898, title to all three blocks passed to Queensland Trustees (Charles H Morton was the licensee during this period), then to the Hayden family in 1912, the Gaffney family in 1918, and the Dixon family in 1947. In 1979, a sale was concluded with Australian adventurer Dick Smith but failed when the hotel burned down the day after contracts were signed. The hotel later featured as the major waypoint on Smith's Bourke to Burketown Bash charity race held in 1985. In 1980, David Brook, a descendant of the Gaffney family, and his friend Kim Fort purchased the hotel and held it for 40 years until selling to its current owners Courtney and Talia Ellis, co-founders of Outback Spirit Tours.

In 1905, a cyclone destroyed all of the structures on the site other than those constructed in stone. Another cyclone led to the collapse of the southeast corner of the building in 1964. This section was reconstructed c. 1990–91, although not to original detail. A fire destroyed the front bar, also in 1964; this has since been rebuilt. Recent major changes to the building have included the replacement of the front verandah, additions to the northern end, and reconstruction of the southeast section. Internally, no original finishes appear to exist; the floors have been laid in slate, walls plastered and painted, and ceilings altered. The building, however, retains its essential character.

The building continues to function as a hotel, and has become nationally famous. With its longevity, romantic remoteness, and as a focus for festivities associated with the annual Birdsville Races, the Birdsville Hotel has become an outback icon.

== Description ==
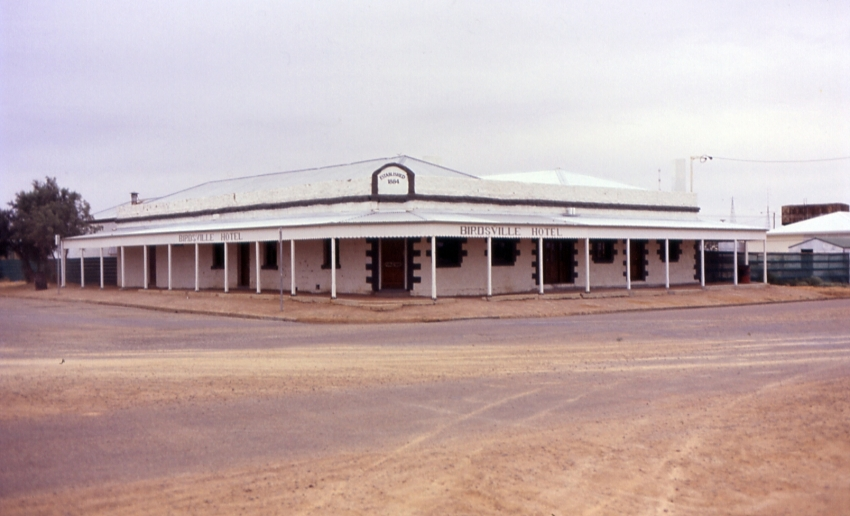
Birdsville Hotel

The Birdsville Hotel is a single-storeyed building constructed of local stone rendered and scribed. It has elevations to Burt and Adelaide Streets and the corner of the building at the street intersections has been truncated marking the original main entrance. The hipped roof is clad with corrugated iron and is concealed by a low masonry parapet raised at the corner to carry the words "Birdsville Hotel" and "Established 1884". An awning of corrugated iron supported by timber posts and decorated by a scalloped timber valance runs along the street elevations and is also truncated at the corner. Quoining at the windows and doors is picked out in a dark colour, as it has been since at least the 1920s. There are extensive modern additions including a beer garden and extra bars.

Across the road from the hotel (25.899241°S 139.351496°E) is a monument to Augustus Poeppel, who surveyed the borders between Queensland and South Australia.

== Heritage listing ==
Birdsville Hotel was listed on the Queensland Heritage Register on 21 October 1992 having satisfied the following criteria.

The place is important in demonstrating the evolution or pattern of Queensland's history.

The Birdsville Hotel, erected c. 1884, survives as an important link with the earliest establishment of pastoral settlement in the Diamantina district of far western Queensland.

The place demonstrates rare, uncommon or endangered aspects of Queensland's cultural heritage.

The place is rare as one of only three surviving masonry buildings in Birdsville, the others being the c. 1883 former Royal Hotel and the 1888–90 police station and courthouse. These contribute significantly to the historic character of the town which, in the last quarter of the 20th century, became a principal Queensland tourist attraction. The Birdsville Hotel is also a rare surviving late 19th century outback hotel, and besides being important in illustrating its type, also has the potential, through physical investigation and documentary research, to reveal important information about the design, form and function of far western Queensland hotel complexes of this period, and about the people who erected such buildings.

The place has potential to yield information that will contribute to an understanding of Queensland's history.

The Birdsville Hotel is also a rare surviving late 19th century outback hotel, and besides being important in illustrating its type, also has the potential, through physical investigation and documentary research, to reveal important information about the design, form and function of far western Queensland hotel complexes of this period, and about the people who erected such buildings.

The place is important in demonstrating the principal characteristics of a particular class of cultural places.

The Birdsville Hotel is important in illustrating the principal characteristics of a vernacular style of masonry construction that spread throughout central Australia, across South Australia, the Northern Territory and Queensland in the late 19th century, efficiently controlling the extremes of temperature in the hot, arid interior of the continent, and compensating for the lack of locally available timber.

The place is important because of its aesthetic significance.

The place is rare as one of only three surviving masonry buildings in Birdsville, the others being the c. 1883 former Royal Hotel and the 1888–90 police station and courthouse. These contribute significantly to the historic character of the town which, in the last quarter of the 20th century, became a principal Queensland tourist attraction. The place has aesthetic value, and is important in defining the Birdsville townscape.

The place has a strong or special association with a particular community or cultural group for social, cultural or spiritual reasons.

The Birdsville Hotel has social value as an outback cultural icon of national significance, a place that has become part of central Australian legend.
