= Birdsville =

- Town
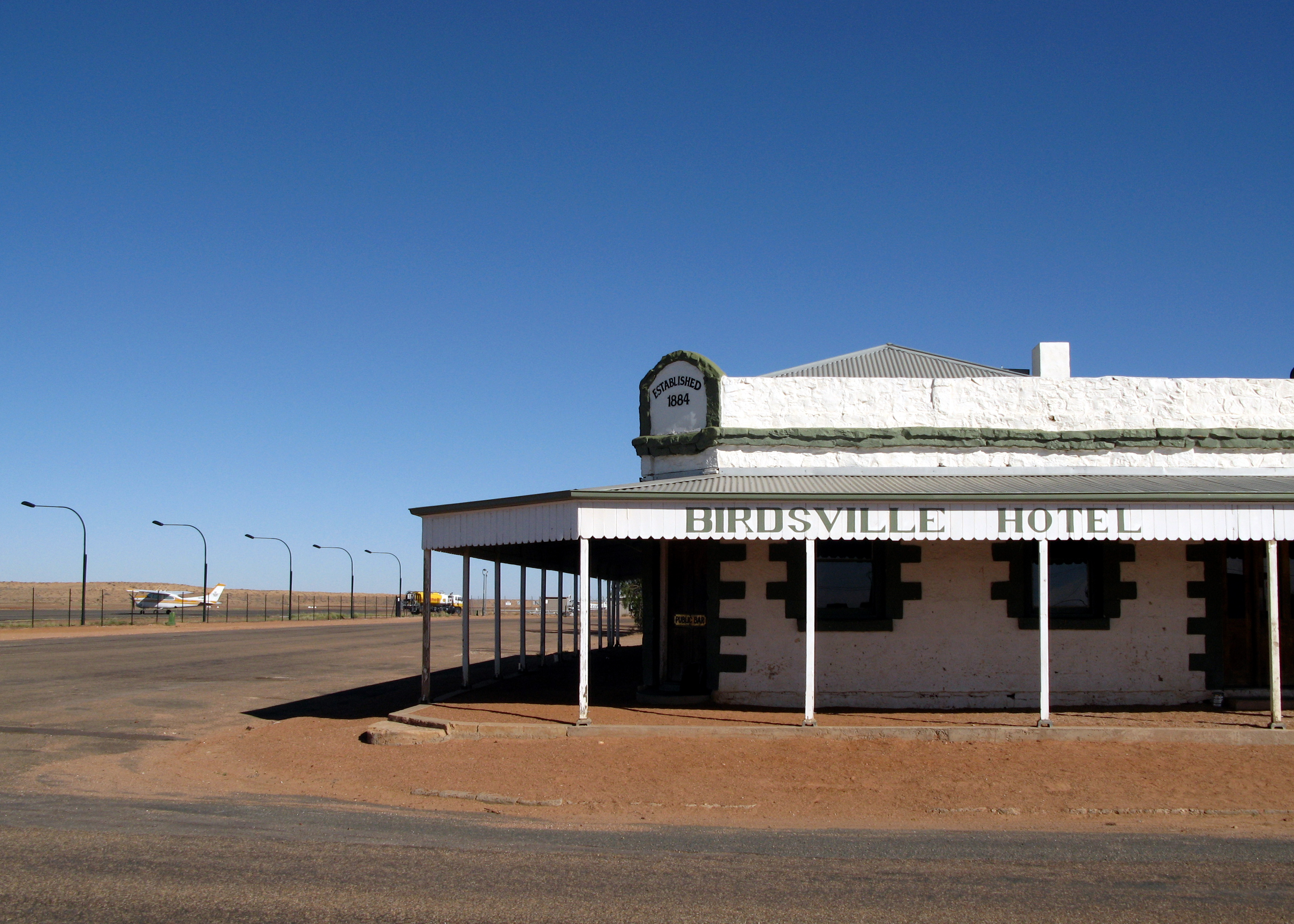
- The Birdsville Hotel, adjacent to the apron of Birdsville Airport

- Interactive map of Birdsville
- Coordinates: 25.8986°S 139.3513°E
- Country: Australia
- State: Queensland
- LGA: Shire of Diamantina
- Location: 162 km (101 mi) SSW of Bedourie; 836 km (519 mi) WNW of Charleville; 1,103 km (685 mi) W of Roma; 1,172 km (728 mi) NNE of Adelaide; 1,581 km (982 mi) W of Brisbane
- Established: 1887

Government
  - State electorate: Gregory
  - Federal division: Maranoa

Area
  - Total: 32,956.2 km^{2} (12,724.5 sq mi)
- Elevation: 46.5 m (153 ft)

Population
  - Total: 110 (2021 census)
  - Density: 0.00334/km^{2} (0.0086/sq mi)
- Time zone: UTC+10:00 (AEST)
- Postcode: 4482
- Mean max temp: 30.6 °C (87.1 °F)
- Mean min temp: 15.9 °C (60.6 °F)
- Annual rainfall: 168.9 mm (6.65 in)
Localities around Birdsville
Northern Territory	Bedourie	Farrars Creek
Northern Territory	Birdsville	Tanbar
South Australia	South Australia	Tanbar

Birdsville is a rural town and locality in the Shire of Diamantina, Queensland, Australia. The locality is on the Queensland border with both the Northern Territory and South Australia. The town is situated 10 kilometres (6 mi) north of the South Australian border. It is a popular tourist destination with many people using it as a starting point across the Simpson Desert. In the 2021 census, the population of the locality of Birdsville was 110 people.

== Geography ==
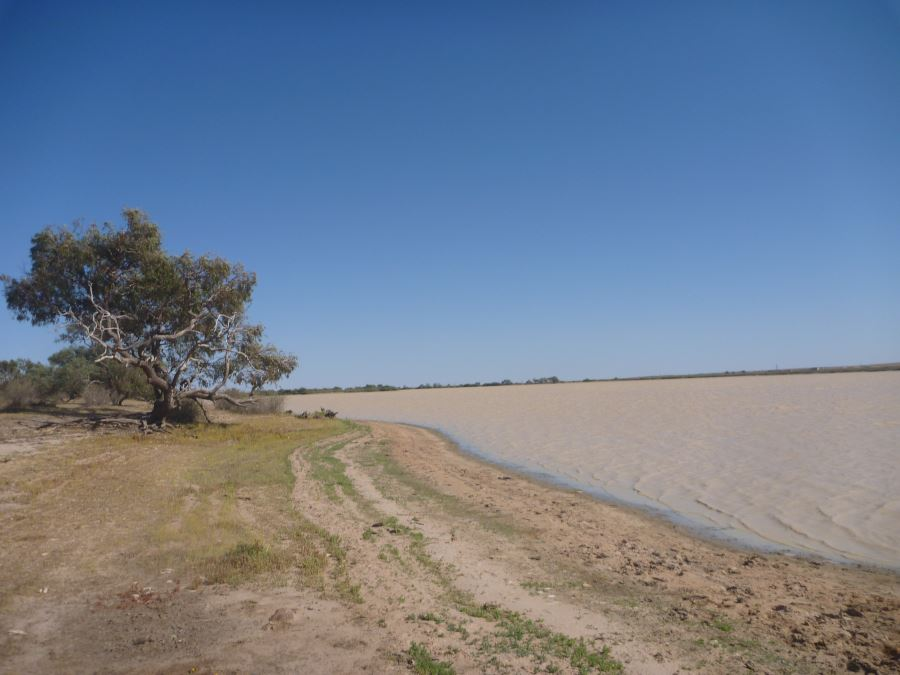
Thundapurty Waterhole, 2021

Birdsville is 1,590 kilometres (990 mi) west of the state capital, Brisbane, 836 kilometres (519 mi) from Charleville and 720 kilometres (450 mi) south of the city of Mount Isa. Birdsville is on the edge of the Simpson Desert, approximately 174 kilometres (108 mi) east of Poeppel Corner.

Birdsville is located about 1.5 kilometres (0.9 mi) north-east of the Diamantina River in the Channel Country in the Lake Eyre drainage basin. Thundahpurty Waterhole is on the river in the east of the locality (25.65°S 140.2333°E).

The Birdsville Track extends 514 kilometres (319 mi) from Marree in South Australia before ending at Birdsville; the road continues north as the Eyre Developmental Road to Bedourie. The Birdsville Developmental Road travels east from the town towards Windorah. A popular route across the Simpson Desert goes from Birdsville to Mount Dare via the French Line. The Line is an unsealed track built in the early 1960s by French Petroleum for oil exploration purposes.

Birdsville Airport is immediately north-west of the town (25.8931°S 139.3451°E). It is operated by the Diamantina Shire Council.

Almost all the buildings in the town are of local sandstone, there being no local timber available. Distance and the lack of good access roads or a railway create prohibitively high transportation costs, so imported building materials are kept to a minimum.

Birdsville has the following mountains:

- Carloowattie Hill (25.9824°S 139.6462°E)
- Grahams Bluff (25.7987°S 139.5896°E)
- Louies Hill (25.7507°S 139.5295°E) 77 metres (253 ft)
- Mount Hal (25.7569°S 140.7564°E) 170 metres (560 ft)
- Mount Leonard (25.6915°S 140.7752°E)
- Mount Lewis (25.8222°S 139.3550°E) 96 metres (315 ft)
- Mount Oakes (25.9484°S 140.7423°E) 159 metres (522 ft)
- One Tree Hill (25.6061°S 140.8755°E)
- Pig Hill (25.6202°S 139.9073°E) 71 metres (233 ft)
- Square Hill (25.2515°S 139.2357°E) 113 metres (371 ft)
- Squaretop Hill (25.9514°S 139.4791°E) 77 metres (253 ft)

== History ==
Birdsville is located on land in the Channel Country of Central West Queensland, Australia. Before Birdsville was established by British settlers, the whole region was inhabited by indigenous Australians, speakers of the Wangkangurru language (also known as Arabana/Wangkangurru, Wangganguru, Wanggangurru or Wongkangurru), whose home range stretched from Birdsville south towards Innamincka and Lake Eyre, including the modern local government areas of the Shire of Diamantina as well as the Outback Communities Authority of South Australia.

Although British explorers had passed through the Diamantina district in the 1840s and early 1860s, pastoralists did not occupy this semi-arid region until the mid-1870s. Brothers Hector and Norman Wilson formed "The Bluff" property around the present site of Birdsville in 1875 as an outpost of their massive Coongy station across the border in South Australia. The Bluff property was also known as Salmonville. Nearby pastoral stations of Annandale, Pandie Pandie, Glengyle and Roseberth were taken up in 1876; and Carcoory in 1877.

Conflict in the region during this time included several large massacres of the resident Aboriginal people being perpetrated. For instance in 1879, Sub-Inspectors Henry Kaye and Henry Gough of the Native Police, together with troopers and stockmen from The Bluff and other properties, conducted a sweeping patrol for the perpetrators of the murder of a stockman. They came across two camps of Aboriginal people and dispersed them. A pastoralist on the nearby Warburton Creek reported to the Police Commissioner in Adelaide that 67 people were killed in these raids and that survivors from the violence had fled to his property.

There are a number of different theories as to the origin of the name Birdsville. One is that the name was suggested by Robert Frew, owner of Pandie Pandie Station, who also had a store and shop at the Diamantina Crossing, in reference to the prolific bird life in the district. The other is that a store was established by Percy Bird and George Field and they called it Birdfield. However, in 1882, G. and R. Wills, of Adelaide, misaddressed a consignment of goods as going to Birdsville and that name stuck. Another is that a man named Burt established a store and called it Burtsville which corrupted to Birdsville. Whatever its origin, by 1882, the name Birdsville was in common use. The name was adopted in the 1885 survey and was formalised at the proclamation of town in 1887.

In 1881, Hector and Norman Wilson sold The Bluff (Salmonville) property for £19,000. Outside of their pastoral business, the brothers resided in Melbourne where they were the driving force behind the establishment of the Melbourne Racing Club, the Coongy Cup and the Caulfield Cup.

In the early 1880s the towns of Birdsville and Bedourie were established to service the newly taken up pastoral holdings of the Diamantina. Reputedly, a merchant named Matthew Flynn, who carried stores for the stations, built a rough depot in the late 1870s at the site of the present town of Birdsville, then known as the Diamantina Crossing, on the stock route from Boulia south to Adelaide. By mid-1885, when the township of Birdsville was officially surveyed, a number of buildings had been erected at the Diamantina Crossing, including a police lock-up (1883), Groth's Royal Hotel (c. 1883), William Blair's Birdsville Hotel (c. 1883), Curtain's Tattersalls Hotel, and at least 3 stores and 1 shop.

When it was proclaimed, the town had three hotels, two stores, a customs house for interstate trade, a police station and a large collection of commercial buildings.

Diamantina Shire was established in 1883, and its headquarters were at Birdsville until moved to Bedourie in 1953. Birdsville Post Office opened on 1 January 1883.

Birdsville, over 1,500 kilometres (930 mi) west of Brisbane and 10 kilometres (6.2 mi) north of the Queensland-South Australian border, developed as an administrative centre for police and border customs. Birdsville is located at the border of South Australia and Queensland to collect tolls from the droves of cattle being moved interstate. Nearly all the trade of the town was with Adelaide, and it became an important marshalling point for cattle being driven south to markets in South Australia. By 1889 the population of Birdsville was 110, and the town had 2 general stores, 3 hotels, a police station, school, 2 blacksmith shops, 2 bakers, a cordial manufacturer, bootmaker, saddler, auctioneer & commission agent, and a number of residences. The population peaked in 1895 at 220.

Birdsville State School opened on 14 August 1899. The school closed in 1948 and has subsequently reopened.

Circa 1900, Birdsville had a population of over 300. It had three hotels, a cordial factory, blacksmith store, market gardens, police and customs facilities but after Federation in 1901, the tolls were abolished and the town fell into decline to about 50 people throughout the 1950s. Livestock trade kept the region alive and since then tourism has joined cattle as the major industry in the area.

Tom Kruse operated the Birdsville Track mail run from 1936 to 1957, driving his Leyland Badger truck. He delivered mail and other supplies including general stores, fuel and medicine to remote stations from Marree in north-west South Australia to Birdsville, some 325 miles (523 kilometres) away. Each trip would take two weeks and Kruse regularly had to manage break-downs, flooding creeks and rivers, and getting bogged in desert dunes.

In 2007, there was just one hotel serving canned or bottled beer, a library, a visitor information centre, a museum and a hospital.

== Demographics ==
In the 2016 census, the locality of Birdsville had a population of 140 people. 86.1% of people were born in Australia and 94.2% of people only spoke English at home.

In the 2021 census, the locality of Birdsville had a population of 110 people.

== Heritage listings ==
Birdsville has a number of heritage-listed sites, including:

- former Australian Inland Mission Hospital, Adelaide Street (25.8978°S 139.3551°E)
- Birdsville Courthouse, Adelaide Street ( 25.9004°S 139.3483°E)
- former Royal Hotel, Adelaide Street (25.8986°S 139.3542°E)
- Birdsville Hotel, Burt Street (25.8985°S 139.3515°E)
- Carcory Homestead Ruin, Eyre Developmental Road (25.2377°S 139.5632°E)
- Burke and Wills "Plant Camp", in the north of the locality (25.1526°S 139.866°E)
- Kidman's Tree of Knowledge, Glengyle Station, Bedourie

== Education ==
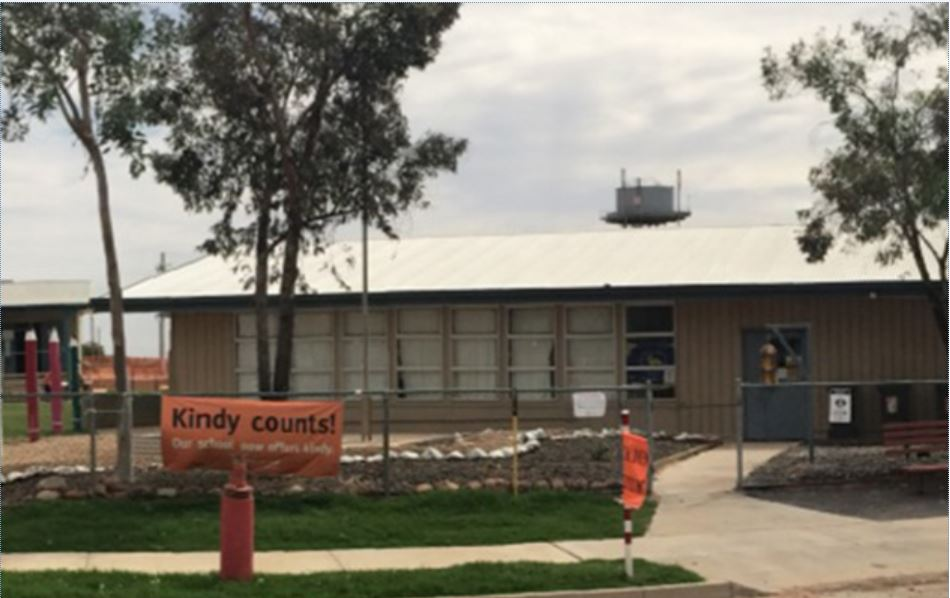
Birdsville State School, 2025

Birdsville State School is a government primary (Early Childhood to Year 6) school for boys and girls at 54 Adelaide Street (25.8984°S 139.3527°E). In 2018, the school had an enrolment of 7 students with 2 teachers and 1 non-teaching staff.

There are no secondary schools in Birdsville nor nearby. Distance education and boarding school are the alternatives.

== Facilities ==
Birdsville has an 80-kilowatt (110 hp) geothermal power station, the only one of its type in Australia. Water is extracted from bore drilled in 1961 on the Great Artesian Basin at 97 to 99 °C (207 to 210 °F) and is used to heat the operating fluid isopentane in a Rankine Cycle engine. The geothermal plant produces around one third of the town's electricity. The water (once cooled) is also the source of the town's drinking water. A plan by Ergon Energy to expand the power plant to completely meet Birdsville's electricity requirements was shelved, in favour of increasing the use of solar power and battery storage.

Birdsville Primary Health Care Centre is at 31 Adelaide Street (25.8977°S 139.3554°E). It provides emergency and primary care by nursing staff with doctors' appointments provided by the Royal Flying Doctor Service. It also provides ambulance services.

Birdsville has the following emergency services:

- Birdsville Police Station, Mcdonald Street (25.9000°S 139.3490°E)
- Birdsville SES Facility, Graham Street (25.8981°S 139.3516°E)

Birdsville Cemetery is on Cemetery Road west of the town (25.8967°S 139.3408°E). It is operated by the Diamantina Shire Council.

== Amenities ==
Birdsville Library is at 29 Burt Street and is operated by the Diamantina Shire Council.

The town is situated near a billabong. A pontoon was built at Burt Street on the north bank of the billabong (25.9029°S 139.3532°E) to facilitate swimming and non-powered boating activities. It is managed by the Diamantina Shire Council. In 2012, the billabong became home to a stray freshwater crocodile, which was subsequently removed and relocated by park ranger Don Rowlands.

== Events ==
The annual Birdsville Races are held in September in aid of the Royal Flying Doctor Service. The town's tiny population increases by between 7000 and 9000 for the two-day event, and hundreds of aircraft fill the town's 1,700-metre (1,859 yd) airstrip. In 2010, the races were cancelled for the first time in the event's history due to rain.

The Big Red Bash is an annual three-day music festival held in July at a site 35 kilometres (22 mi) west of the town of Birdsville. Attendees camp at the site.

The Simpson Desert Bike Challenge also traditionally finishes in Birdsville in October every year.

The Big Red Run is held at Birdsville during the winter tourist season. It was last held in 2018.

== Climate ==
Birdsville has a hot desert climate (BWh in the Köppen climate classification) with an average of only 22 days of rain a year. Summers are extremely hot and dry, with winters being mild to warm. The median annual rainfall at Birdsville is 133 mm (5.2 in) The actual amount of rain which falls is highly variable, for example, in 1914 just 14 mm (0.55 in) was recorded while 659 mm (25.9 in) fell in 1917. Dust storms are most likely during periods of strong wind which typically occur in spring. Birdsville has recorded the highest confirmed temperature in the state of Queensland, with 49.5 °C (121.1 °F) having been recorded on 24 December 1972.

Climate data for Birdsville (2005–2025 normals, extremes 1954–present)
Month	Jan	Feb	Mar	Apr	May	Jun	Jul	Aug	Sep	Oct	Nov	Dec	Year
Record high °C (°F)	49.4 (120.9)	47.5 (117.5)	46.5 (115.7)	41.7 (107.1)	37.8 (100.0)	32.9 (91.2)	34.4 (93.9)	39.7 (103.5)	42.8 (109.0)	46.1 (115.0)	48.7 (119.7)	49.5 (121.1)	49.5 (121.1)
Mean maximum °C (°F)	46.0 (114.8)	44.0 (111.2)	42.5 (108.5)	37.3 (99.1)	31.9 (89.4)	29.2 (84.6)	29.2 (84.6)	33.7 (92.7)	38.3 (100.9)	41.7 (107.1)	43.9 (111.0)	45.6 (114.1)	47.2 (117.0)
Mean daily maximum °C (°F)	40.7 (105.3)	38.8 (101.8)	35.9 (96.6)	31.6 (88.9)	25.7 (78.3)	21.5 (70.7)	21.9 (71.4)	24.9 (76.8)	29.6 (85.3)	33.5 (92.3)	36.5 (97.7)	39.1 (102.4)	31.6 (89.0)
Daily mean °C (°F)	33.7 (92.7)	31.9 (89.4)	29.1 (84.4)	24.4 (75.9)	18.7 (65.7)	14.7 (58.5)	14.6 (58.3)	16.9 (62.4)	21.5 (70.7)	25.5 (77.9)	29.0 (84.2)	31.7 (89.1)	24.3 (75.8)
Mean daily minimum °C (°F)	26.7 (80.1)	25.0 (77.0)	22.3 (72.1)	17.1 (62.8)	11.6 (52.9)	7.9 (46.2)	7.2 (45.0)	8.9 (48.0)	13.4 (56.1)	17.4 (63.3)	21.4 (70.5)	24.3 (75.7)	16.9 (62.5)
Mean minimum °C (°F)	20.0 (68.0)	18.1 (64.6)	15.5 (59.9)	10.8 (51.4)	6.0 (42.8)	3.2 (37.8)	2.5 (36.5)	3.9 (39.0)	7.0 (44.6)	10.6 (51.1)	13.9 (57.0)	16.6 (61.9)	2.1 (35.8)
Record low °C (°F)	11.7 (53.1)	13.9 (57.0)	9.4 (48.9)	6.0 (42.8)	1.7 (35.1)	−1.7 (28.9)	−1.7 (28.9)	0.4 (32.7)	1.5 (34.7)	5.3 (41.5)	8.4 (47.1)	9.4 (48.9)	−1.7 (28.9)
Average rainfall mm (inches)	23.0 (0.91)	19.9 (0.78)	39.5 (1.56)	4.6 (0.18)	8.3 (0.33)	11.6 (0.46)	5.1 (0.20)	3.3 (0.13)	8.7 (0.34)	9.3 (0.37)	17.1 (0.67)	12.2 (0.48)	162.6 (6.41)
Average rainy days (≥ 1 mm)	2.2	1.6	2.1	0.6	1.1	1.4	0.9	0.5	1.3	1.1	2.3	2.1	17.2
Average relative humidity (%)	21	26	23	26	34	44	39	29	21	17	20	18	27
Average dew point °C (°F)	8.0 (46.4)	9.8 (49.6)	5.9 (42.6)	3.6 (38.5)	2.5 (36.5)	2.7 (36.9)	0.8 (33.4)	−1.5 (29.3)	−2.0 (28.4)	−1.7 (28.9)	3.5 (38.3)	4.3 (39.7)	3.0 (37.4)
Source: Bureau of Meteorology (dew point for 3pm)

== Birdsville disease ==
Birdsville disease is an illness observed in horses, caused by eating the native plant Birdsville indigo (Indigofera linnaei) which contains natural toxins including the neurotoxin 3 nitropropionic acid (3-NPA). The affected horses exhibit weakness and lack of coordination; it can be fatal. It does not appear to affect cattle. Although it is not unique to Birdsville, the condition was first observed in the Birdsville district in May 1886. While there were many theories about the cause of the disease including plants, worms and sunstroke, it was not until 1950 that researchers identified the precise cause. Mildly affected horses can recover with a regimen of drenching with gelatine and feeding a diet high in arginine but euthanasia is recommended for severely affected horses. As there is no cure, preventing horses from grazing on indigo is recommended.

== In popular culture ==
- Elizabeth Haran's 2004 novel Stars in the Southern Sky is set in the town (though it is renamed to Kangaroo Crossing).
- The 2014 British comedy film The Inbetweeners 2 had scenes set in the town.
- The 1983 novel The Film-Makers by Kenneth and Kerry Cook is partially set in Birdsville.
- Slim Dusty sang a song about the Birdsville Pub (hotel) called "Where Country Is".
- The 1954 film The Back of Beyond was about the mail run to Birdsville.
- Oliver Herbrich's 1982 documentary film Dead Heart is about Birdsville and the centenary horse race.

== See also ==
- List of extreme temperatures in Australia
