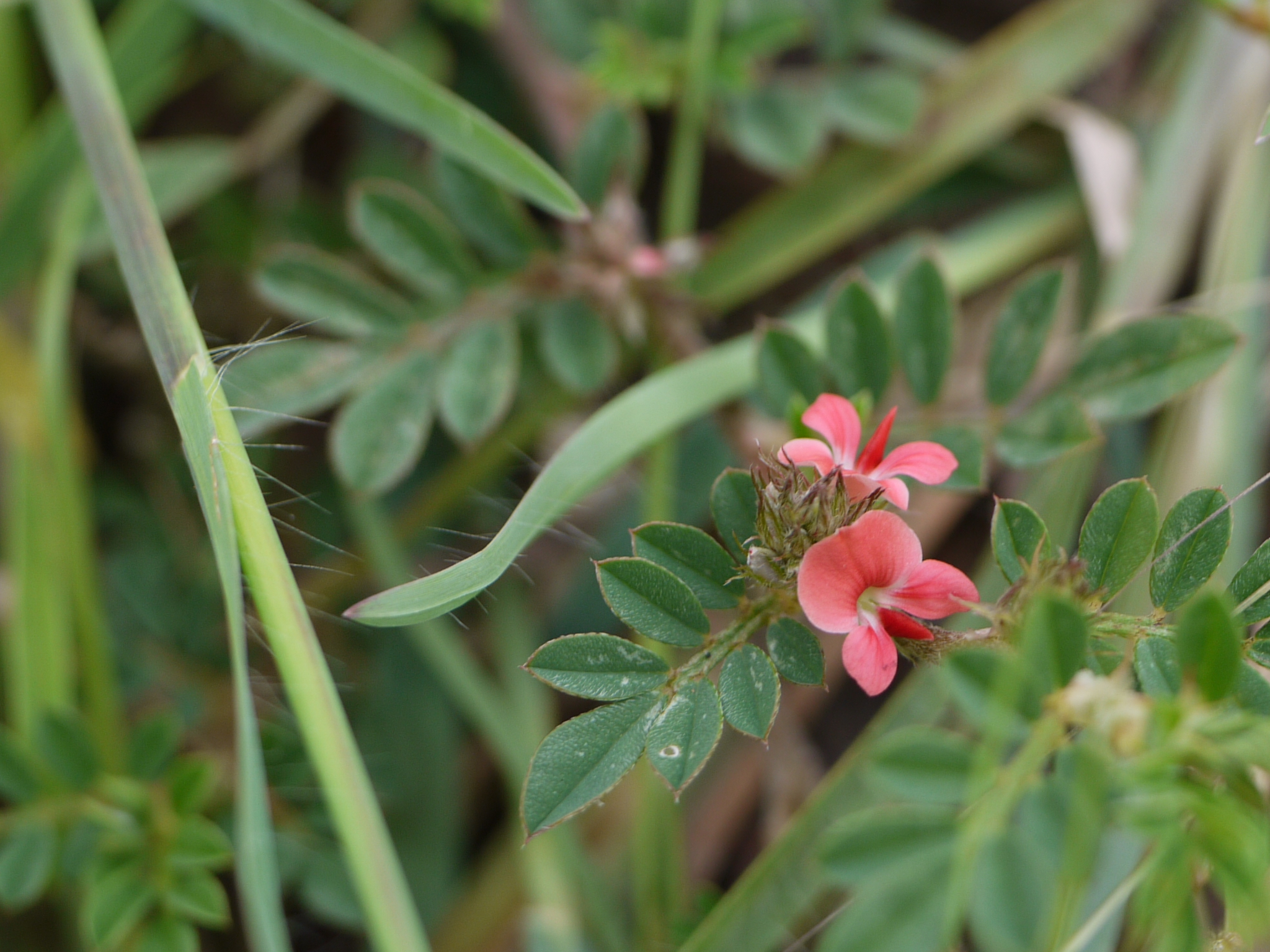

Scientific classification
- Kingdom: Plantae
- Clade: Embryophytes
- Clade: Tracheophytes
- Clade: Spermatophytes
- Clade: Angiosperms
- Clade: Eudicots
- Clade: Rosids
- Order: Fabales
- Family: Fabaceae
- Subfamily: Faboideae
- Genus: Indigofera
- Species: I. tsiangiana

Binomial name
- Indigofera tsiangiana Metcalf
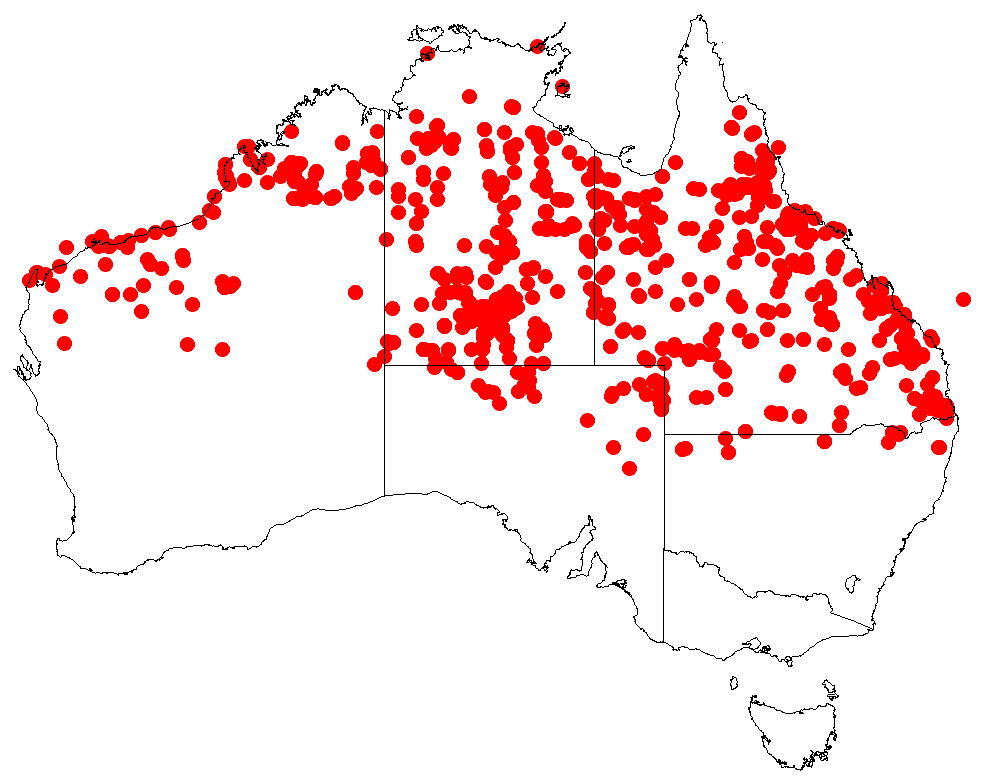
- Australian occurrence data from Australasian Virtual Herbarium

Synonyms
- Anil prostrata (L.) Kuntze; Hedysarum prostratum L.; Indigofera caespitosa Wight; Indigofera debilis Graham; Indigofera dominii H.Eichler; Indigofera linnaei Ali; Indigofera paludosa Lepr. ex Guill. & Perr.; Indigofera prostrata (L.) Domin; Indigofera pusilla Lam.; Indigofera tenella Vahl ex DC.; Onobrychis prostrata (L.) Scop.

= Indigofera tsiangiana =

Species of plant

Indigofera tsiangiana, synonym Indigofera linnaei, known as Birdsville indigo and nine-leaved indigo, is a species of leguminous shrub in the genus Indigofera (family Fabaceae).

It is found in Sudan and throughout much of tropical Asia, extending through the various archipelagos to Australia, where it is widespread in the northern part of the continent.

== Description ==
Indigofera tsiangiana is a spreading, usually prostrate woody herb, 15–50 cm high with a long taproot, which forms a flat mat up to 1.5 m across, and up to 45 cm high. The compound leaves are up to 3 cm long, with (generally) 7 or 9 obovate, alternate leaflets which have a mucronate apex and are about 8–15 mm long and 2–5 mm wide. The stipules are lanceolate (shaped like a lance-head) and about 5 mm long with broad, dry margins. The inflorescences are dense and up to 2 cm long. The calyx is covered with spreading, white hairs. The petals are red. The standard slightly exceeds the calyx, and the wings and keel are shorter. The pod is oblong and silky, about 3–7 mm long, pointed at apex, and usually contains two seeds.

The branches are covered with appressed white hairs; leaves peltate, 3–5 cm long; leaflets 7–9, obovate-cuneate, 8-13 x 2–5 mm, mucronate, sericeous on both sides; stipules c. 3 mm long, lanceolate, lateral, free, sericeous. The inflorescence is a subsessile, dense, a glomerule-like spike, 1–2 cm long. It is few- to 25-flowered, with bracts lanceolate, 3–4 mm long, pubescent, scarious, with a strong central vein terminating in an acuminate tip. The flowers are sessile, about 5 mm long; calyx campanulate, 3–5 mm long, villous, the narrow acuminate teeth much longer than the tube. The petals red; standard obovate-spathulate, slightly exceeding the calyx; wings and keel shorter, inserted.

In the Northern Territory, it is a weedy species often found in disturbed or overgrazed areas and on a variety of soils from skeletal soils and red sand to cracking clay. It flowers and fruits in all months of the year.

In Western Australia, it flowers from January to May, and is found on sandy soils, on sandstone & limestone ridges, along rivers and creeks, and on rocky hillsides. It is not considered a species of conservation concern in Western Australia to according to the Declared Rare and Priority Flora List.

== Distribution ==
It is found in Sudan, throughout much of tropical Asia (Assam,Tamilnadu, Bangladesh, Bismarck Archipelago, China, Himalaya, Hainan, India, Indonesia, Laos, Lesser Sunda Islands, Maldives, Myanmar, Nepal, New Guinea, Pakistan, Sri Lanka, Sudan, Sulawesi, Thailand, and Vietnam), and in Australia. Within Australia it is found in Queensland, Western Australia, the Northern Territory, New South Wales, and South Australia.

== Toxicity ==
It took considerable time before it was recognised as the plant which gave horses the "Birdsville" disease (a disease of horses in arid and semi-arid Australia), with the causal agent being suspected by Everist as being indospicene or possibly cavananine. However, current research indicates that the neurotoxic effects on horses with Birdsville disease are due to the neurotoxin 3 nitropropionic acid (3-NPA), with horses less susceptible than cattle to the hepatotoxic effects of indospicene. The neurotoxic effect on horses generally occurs just after the rains, because I. tsiangiana responds more quickly to moisture than other species.

Nonetheless, indospicene (also spelled indospicine) accumulates in the tissues of grazing livestock after ingestion of Indigofera, causing both liver degeneration and abortion across animal species but the degree varies considerably between species. The magnitude of sensitivity in dogs is such that consumption of indospicine-contaminated horse and camel meat has caused secondary poisoning of dogs. Livestock grazing Indigofera have a chronic and cumulative exposure to this toxin, with such exposure experimentally shown to induce both hepatotoxicity and embryo-lethal effects in cattle and sheep.
