= Birdsville Races =

Annual horse race in Australia

Coordinates: 25.917°S 139.383°E

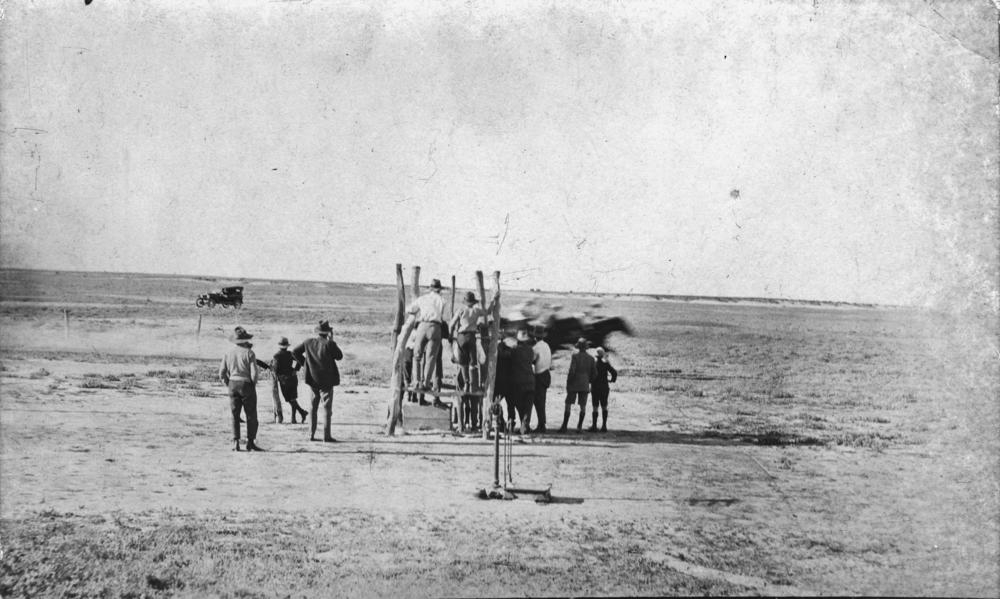
Horses flying past on the Birdsville Racetrack, circa 1926

The Birdsville Races are horse races held each year in September in the Queensland, Australia, town of Birdsville. Funds are raised in aid of the Royal Flying Doctor Service of Australia. The population is swelled from about 100 to around 7,000 people for the two-day event.

As Birdsville is very remote, many travellers come by air and hundreds of aircraft fill the town's airstrip. The town of Quilpie celebrates the event by welcoming travellers who are heading westwards to Birdsville by road.

In 2009 as part of the Q150 celebrations, the Birdsville Races were announced as one of the Q150 Icons of Queensland for its role as an "event and festival".

== History ==
The first races were run in the town in 1882. The club that convened the meeting was originally called the Birdsville Amateur Turf Club. It later changed to the Diamantina Amateur Race Club as it also convened the Betoota race meeting. In 1990 it separated from Betoota and became the Birdsville Race Club Incorporated.

The 2007 races were affected by a national outbreak of horse flu. The 2009 event attracted a crowd estimated at around 7,000, requiring 20 extra police to be temporarily posted to the small town. The 2010 races were cancelled, the first cancellation in the event's history of 128 years, due to flooding.

The races were also cancelled in 2020 due to the COVID-19 pandemic in Australia. In 2021 they were also "called off" and rescheduled to April 2022. The vice-president of Birdsville Race Club, Gary Brook, said: "... more than 85 per cent of ticket holders hailed from locations unable to currently travel to regional Queensland due to lockdowns or government advice."

== Races ==
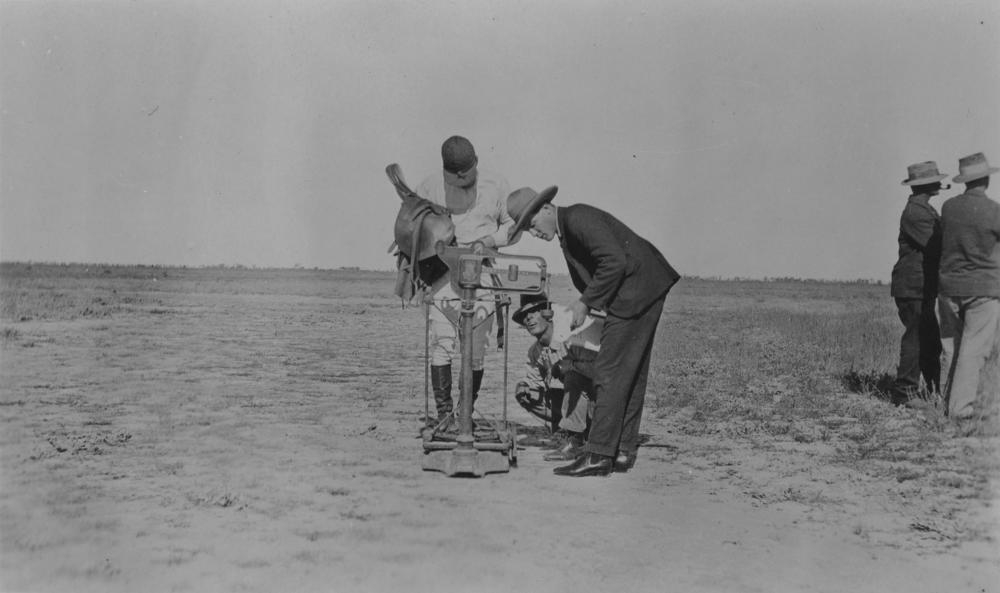
Weighing in at the Birdsville Races Queensland, circa 1926

In the past the Birdsville races have included:

- a seven-pound handicap or penalty for professional riders
- special races for horses bred within 250 miles of Birdsville. There were also separate races for horses fed with corn and those fed on grass.
- prizemoney for the cup has varied from 500 pounds in the 1880s to 50 pounds in the 1940s, A$5,000 in 1982 and $25,000 in 2002.
- the cup distance has been 1 mile or 1,600 metres since the first race, in 1882. In 1949 and 1950 the ‘Hospital Handicap’ (1 mile) was run in lieu of the Cup. Meetings were held then to raise funds for the construction of the Birdsville Hospital. The annual race meeting is now held to raise funds for the Royal Flying Doctor Service and Birdsville Clinic.
- races were once started by the drop of a hat and later by strand barriers. They are now started with barrier stalls.
- the old course was three miles to the west of the town. There used to be steeplechase races on this course. The course was abandoned as it was prone to flooding.

== See also ==
- Sport in Queensland
