= Pandie Pandie Station =

Pastoral lease in South Australia

Coordinates: 26.13°S 139.39°E

Location in South Australia

Pandie Pandie Station, most commonly known as Pandie Pandie, also often spelled as Pandi Pandi or Pandy Pandy, is a pastoral lease that operates as a cattle station in north east South Australia. It lies on the eastern edge of Karanguru territory.

It is situated about 26 kilometres (16 mi) south of Birdsville and 222 kilometres (138 mi) north west of Innamincka along the banks of the Diamantina River in the channel country of South Australia. It is also situated toward the northern end of the Birdsville Track.

== History ==
The station was established in 1876 by Robert Frew along with other properties in the area including Annandale, Alton Downs and Planet Downs. Nearby Haddon Downs station was also taken up by Frew in 1877.

Frew still owned the property in 1881 when he renamed the town of Diamantina Crossing to its present name of Birdsville after being amazed at the amount of birdlife found around the area.

By 1903 Sidney Kidman owned the property, and at this time it was completely destocked after suffering the effects of drought and the death of many cattle.

In 1938, the station was acquired by the Morton family, who held it for 70 years until 2008.

In 2008, the property was put up for auction for A$7–8 million as part of a package of three blocks – Pandie Pandie, Beckwith and Dickinna – with a total area of 6,625 square kilometres (2,558 sq mi). It was sold for A$7.5 million to Viv Oldfield with 7800 head of cattle.

Viv Oldfield, along with the Costello family, runs 50,000 cattle across seven stations with a total area of 40,000 square kilometres (15,444 sq mi) in the Northern Territory and South Australia. The manager of Pandie Pandie is Peter Morton (Pandie Pete). The station runs Brahman cattle.

The land occupying the extent of the Pandie Pandie pastoral lease was gazetted as a locality in April 2013 under the name "Pandie Pandie".

== See also ==
- List of ranches and stations
- List of reduplicated Australian place names
