= Documentary research =

Use of outside sources to support the argument of an academic work

Documentary research is the use of outside sources, documents, to support the viewpoint or argument of an academic work. The process of documentary research often involves some or all of conceptualising, using and assessing documents. The analysis of the documents in documentary research would be either quantitative or qualitative analysis (or both). The key issues surrounding types of documents and our ability to use them as reliable sources of evidence on the social world must be considered by all who use documents in their research.

== See also ==
- Documentary evidence
- Primary source
