= Bedourie, Queensland =

Bedourie
- Town
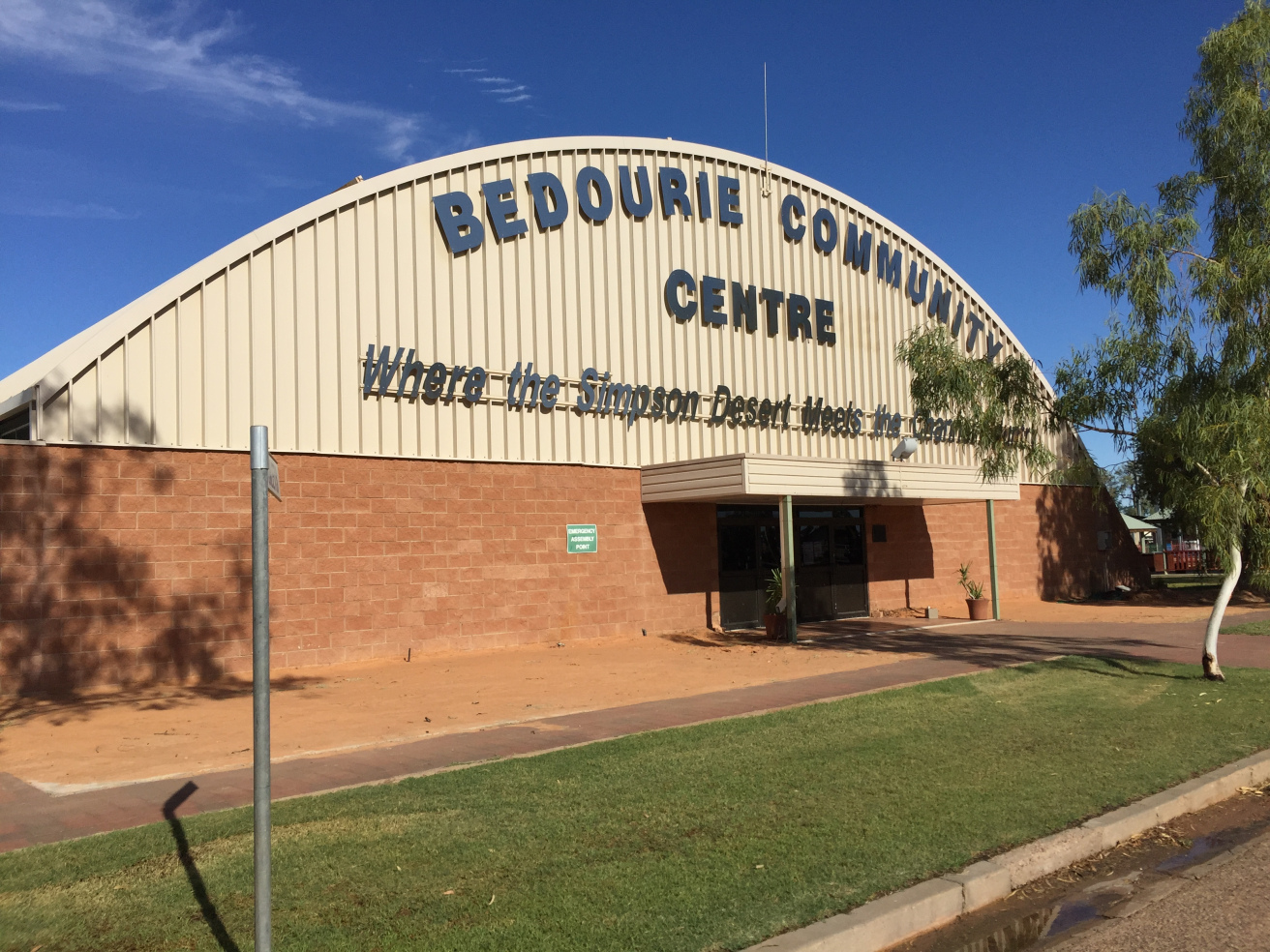
- Bedourie Community Centre, 2016

- Interactive map of Bedourie
- Coordinates: 24.3594°S 139.4691°E
- Country: Australia
- State: Queensland
- LGA: Shire of Diamantina
- Location: 217 km (135 mi) S of Boulia; 506 km (314 mi) S of Mount Isa; 1,668 km (1,036 mi) WNW of Brisbane

Government
  - State electorate: Gregory
  - Federal division: Maranoa

Area
  - Total: 36,186.5 km^{2} (13,971.7 sq mi)
- Elevation: 90 m (300 ft)

Population
  - Total: 150 (2021 census)
  - Density: 0.00415/km^{2} (0.0107/sq mi)
- Time zone: UTC+10:00 (AEST)
- Postcode: 4829
- County: Eurinye County, Queensland
- Parish: Bedourie
- Mean max temp: 32.0 °C (89.6 °F)
- Mean min temp: 16.7 °C (62.1 °F)
- Annual rainfall: 201.3 mm (7.93 in)
Localities around Bedourie
Northern Territory	Sturt; Amaroo	Wills
Northern Territory	Bedourie	Diamantina Lakes
Northern Territory	Birdsville	Farrars Creek

Bedourie is an outback town and locality in the Shire of Diamantina, Queensland, Australia. It is on the border with the Northern Territory. According to 2021 census, the locality of Bedourie had a population of 150 people. The name ‘Bedourie’ is understood to mean ‘dust storm’ in the language of the traditional custodians, the Wangkamahdla people.

== Geography ==
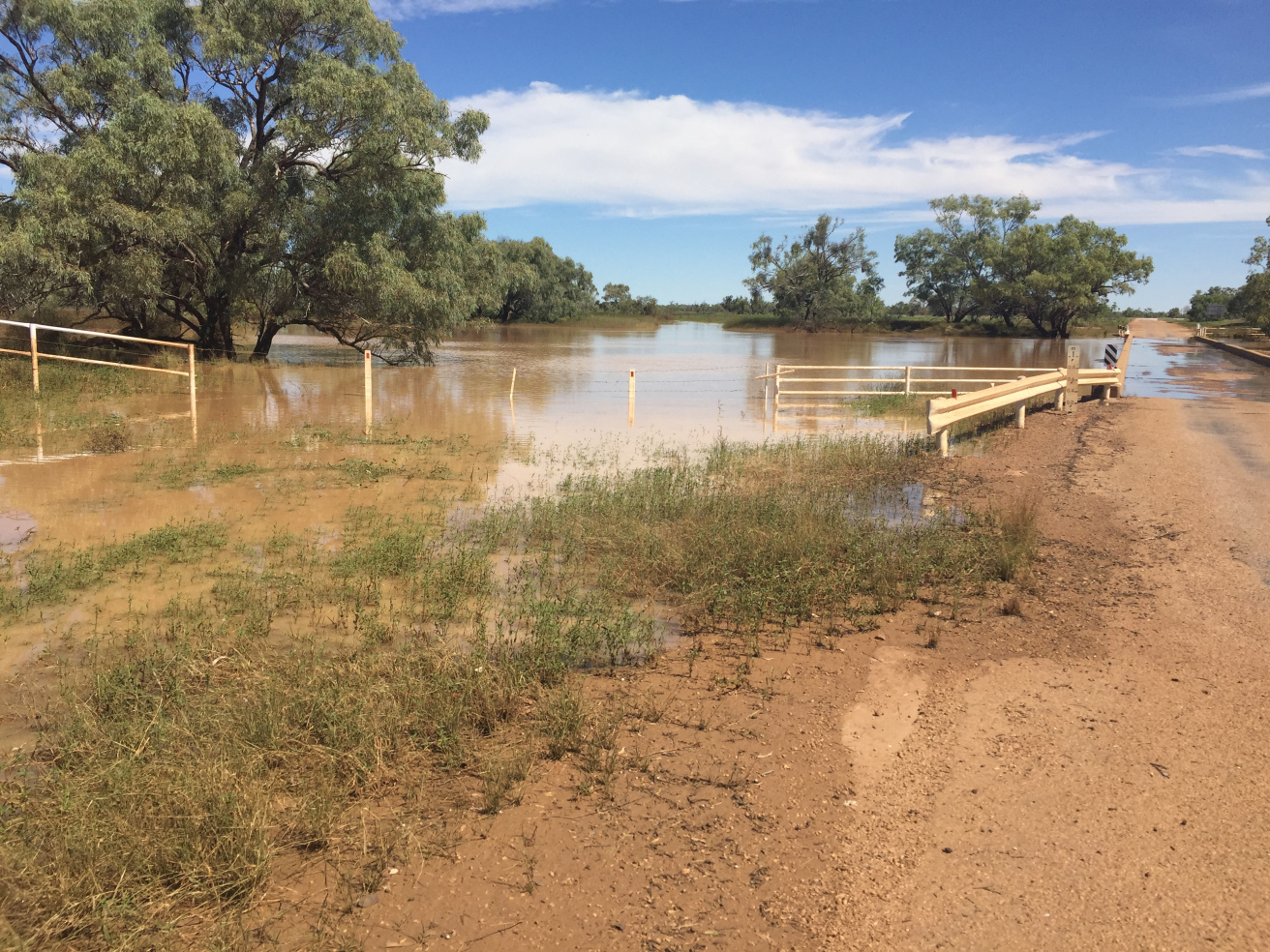
Georgina River flooding covering the bridge, 2016

Bedourie is located in the Channel Country of Central West Queensland, Australia, lying on Eyre Creek. It is located 1,600 kilometres (990 mi) west of the state capital, Brisbane, and 200 kilometres (120 mi) north of Birdsville.

Bedourie is the administrative centre of the Diamantina Shire, which also comprises the towns of Birdsville and Betoota.

When the Georgina River experiences severe floods the town can be cut off by road for months at a time.

Bedourie has the following mountains:

- Black Hill (24.5994°S 139.2609°E) 94 metres (308 ft)
- Mount Cuttiguree (24.5194°S 140.3711°E) 160 metres (520 ft)
- Mount Prout (23.9607°S 139.6371°E) 135 metres (443 ft)
- Mount Tarley (23.9748°S 139.2275°E) 183 metres (600 ft)
- Mount Woneeala (24.2661°S 140.1175°E) 132 metres (433 ft)
- Pampra Hill (24.7665°S 139.3547°E) 97 metres (318 ft)
- The Brothers (24.2764°S 139.2386°E) 147 metres (482 ft)
- The Sisters (23.6800°S 139.2043°E) 208 metres (682 ft)

== History ==
The area around Bedourie is on Wangkamahdla land. The region was originally inhabited by Indigenous communities prior to the arrival of pastoralists, who subsequently established cattle stations. Throughout the late nineteenth century, Bedourie served as a significant watering and rest stop for drovers transporting livestock from the Northern Territory and north-west Queensland to Birdsville, some 200 kilometres to the south.

In 1881, a Native Police camp known as the Eyre's Creek barracks was established on the site by Sub-Inspector Robert Barrington Sharpe. Operations were conducted from the barracks until it was decommissioned in 1889. Sharpe shot himself in the head in 1886 and was replaced by Sub-Inspector Robert Kyle Little who shot numerous Indigenous people on at least one punitive expedition. Little later died from heat exhaustion just before the barracks closed.

In February 1887, 2 square miles (5.2 km^{2}) were reserved as the site for a town.

The Royal Hotel was constructed and opened in 1886 by Hylock & Co. with a thatched roof (later replaced with corrugated iron) and the locality was renamed Bedourie.

Bedourie Post Office opened around July 1903 (receiving offices known as Bidouri, Bedouri and Bedourie had been open since 1887).

The Diamantina Shire Council moved its headquarters from Birdsville to Bedourie in 1953.

Bedourie State School opened on 16 May 1960. The current school building opened in 1967.

The Bedourie Public Library had a major refurbishment in 2009.

== Demographics ==
In the 1986 census, the town of Bedourie had a population of 60 people.

In the 2006 census, the locality of Bedourie and the surrounding area had a population of 142 people.

In the 2016 census, the locality of Bedourie had a population of 122 people.

In the 2021 census, the locality of Bedourie had a population of 150 people.

== Heritage listings ==
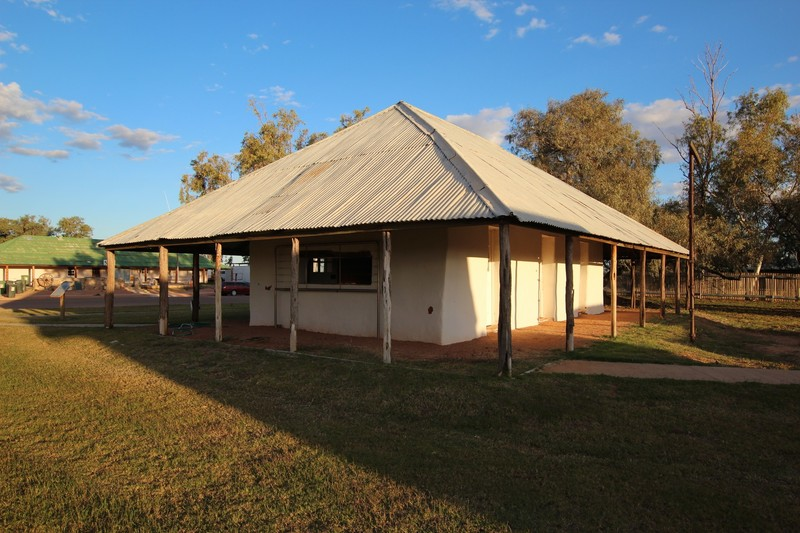
Bedourie Pisé House, with Royal Hotel in background, 2016

There are a number of heritage-listed sites in Bedourie, including:

- Kidman's Tree of Knowledge at Glengyle Station (24.785°S 139.5925°E)
- Bedourie Pisé House, 5 Herbert Street (24.3618°S 139.4703°E)

== Education ==
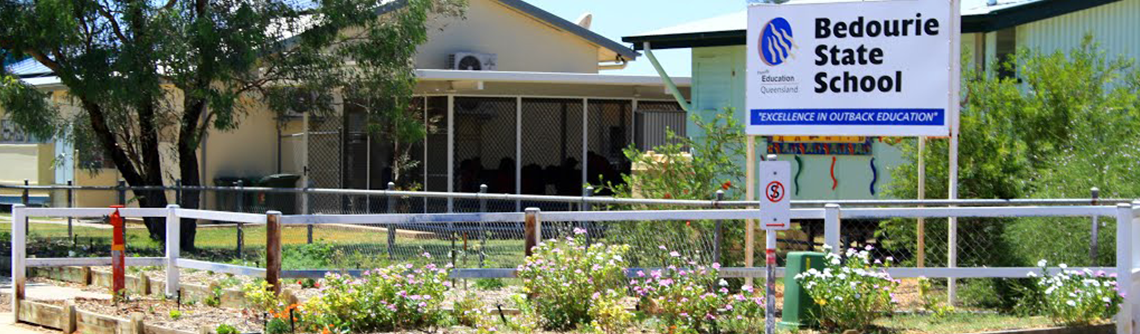
Bedourie State School, 2022

Bedourie State School is a government primary (Early Childhood to Year 6) school for boys and girls at 3 Timor Street (24.3603°S 139.4713°E). In 2017, the school had an enrolment of 8 students with 2 teachers and 3 non-teaching staff (1 full-time equivalent). In 2018, the school had an enrolment of 7 students with 2 teachers and 5 non-teaching staff (2 full-time equivalent).

There are no secondary schools in Bedourie or nearby. The options are distance education and boarding school.

== Amenities ==
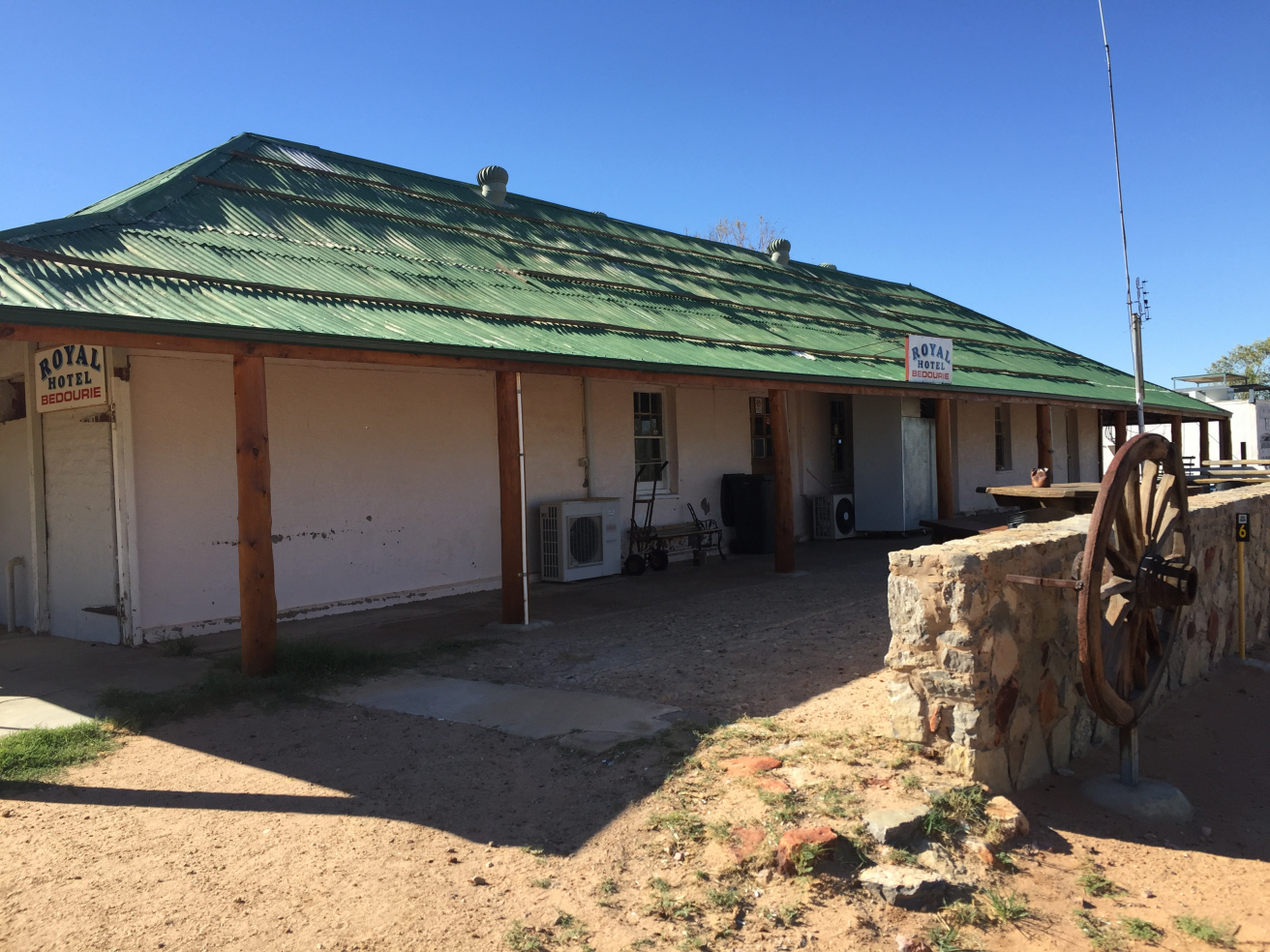
Royal Hotel, 2016

Bedourie has an aquatic centre, museum, outback golf course, visitor information centre, a tourist park and a racetrack.

The Royal Hotel was built from adobe bricks in the 1880s.

The Diamantina Shire Council operates the Bedourie Library on 13 Herbert Street.

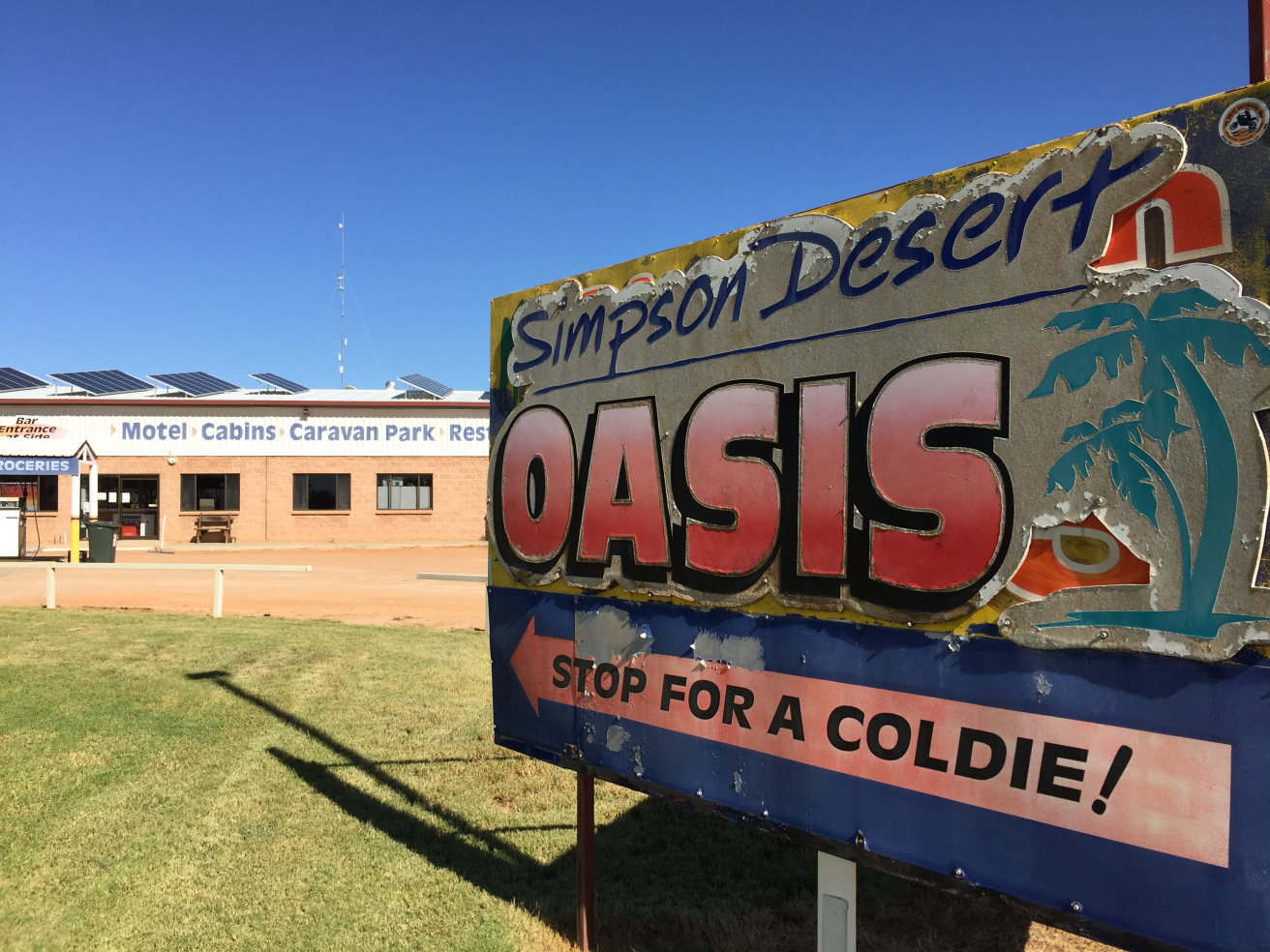
Simpson Desert Oasis Roadhouse, 2016

The Simpson Desert Roadhouse provides petrol and automotive services, accommodation, general supplies, restaurant and bar.

== Attractions ==
The Bedourie Camel Races are held annually in July. The event is coordinated by the Bedourie Golf and Leisure Club and is a major tourist event for the region. As well as camel racing, the event hosts pig races, live music and entertainment. The town is renowned for the Bedourie Camp Oven, a modification of traditional camp ovens developed in the 1920s to withstand the rigours of travel across the outback.

== Total solar eclipses ==
Bedourie will have the rare experience of being located within the path of totality of two total solar eclipses, only nine years apart. The first will occur on 22 July 2028 and the second on 13 July 2037.

== Climate ==
Bedourie experiences a hot desert climate (Köppen: BWh), with very hot summers and very mild winters, albeit with cool nights. Due to its inland location, there is strong seasonal temperature variation, with average maxima vary from 22.7 °C (72.9 °F) in June and July to 39.5 °C (103.1 °F) in January. Average annual rainfall is very low: 203.1 mm (8.00 in), occurring within 16.3 rainfall days, primarily in the summer. Precipitation is highly erratic, evidenced by the 319.1 mm (12.56 in) of rain falling on 6 March 2011. The town is very sunny, averaging 186.4 clear days and only 48.6 cloudy days annually. Extreme temperatures have ranged from 0.9 °C (33.6 °F) on 8 July 2014 to 47.6 °C (117.7 °F) on 24 December 2019.

Climate data for Bedourie (24º21'36"S, 139º28'12"E, 91 m AMSL) (1998-2024 normals and extremes, rainfall to 1932)
Month	Jan	Feb	Mar	Apr	May	Jun	Jul	Aug	Sep	Oct	Nov	Dec	Year
Record high °C (°F)	47.3 (117.1)	45.4 (113.7)	44.9 (112.8)	40.9 (105.6)	35.0 (95.0)	33.5 (92.3)	33.0 (91.4)	38.5 (101.3)	42.0 (107.6)	44.0 (111.2)	46.8 (116.2)	47.6 (117.7)	47.6 (117.7)
Mean daily maximum °C (°F)	39.5 (103.1)	38.3 (100.9)	35.8 (96.4)	31.9 (89.4)	26.3 (79.3)	22.7 (72.9)	22.7 (72.9)	25.7 (78.3)	30.1 (86.2)	34.2 (93.6)	36.6 (97.9)	38.8 (101.8)	31.9 (89.4)
Mean daily minimum °C (°F)	25.5 (77.9)	24.2 (75.6)	21.8 (71.2)	17.3 (63.1)	11.7 (53.1)	8.6 (47.5)	7.7 (45.9)	9.2 (48.6)	13.4 (56.1)	17.5 (63.5)	20.9 (69.6)	23.7 (74.7)	16.8 (62.2)
Record low °C (°F)	16.7 (62.1)	15.4 (59.7)	11.7 (53.1)	6.8 (44.2)	3.7 (38.7)	1.0 (33.8)	0.9 (33.6)	1.8 (35.2)	5.4 (41.7)	7.0 (44.6)	9.9 (49.8)	13.0 (55.4)	0.9 (33.6)
Average precipitation mm (inches)	32.5 (1.28)	34.1 (1.34)	29.4 (1.16)	9.9 (0.39)	11.1 (0.44)	9.5 (0.37)	10.4 (0.41)	7.4 (0.29)	9.5 (0.37)	13.6 (0.54)	19.1 (0.75)	16.8 (0.66)	203.1 (8.00)
Average precipitation days (≥ 1.0 mm)	2.2	2.1	1.6	0.9	1.1	1.0	0.9	0.7	0.9	1.5	1.7	1.7	16.3
Average afternoon relative humidity (%)	27	31	30	30	31	34	32	26	23	19	23	24	28
Average dew point °C (°F)	12.6 (54.7)	14.6 (58.3)	12.7 (54.9)	9.8 (49.6)	6.1 (43.0)	4.1 (39.4)	3.8 (38.8)	2.2 (36.0)	3.9 (39.0)	4.0 (39.2)	7.4 (45.3)	10.3 (50.5)	7.6 (45.7)
Source: Bureau of Meteorology (1998-2024 normals and extremes, rainfall to 1932)

== See also ==
- Bedourie Airport
- Bedourie oven
