= Annandale Station =

Pastoral lease in Queensland

Coordinates: 25.8971°S 138.865°E

Location in Queensland

Annandale Station, most commonly known as Annandale, is a pastoral lease that operates as a cattle station in central west Queensland. It is located on the tribal lands of the Wongkamala.

The property is located 49 kilometres (30 mi) west Birdsville and 350 kilometres (217 mi) south of Boulia in the Channel Country of Queensland.

== History ==
The station was the first established in the area when Patrick Drinan took up the run in July 1876. Other properties were settled soon afterwards including Kaliduwarry and Glengyle Stations. The station was named after his family's estate, Annandale, in Gladstone.

Drinan sold the property to the Collins brothers the following year. The Collins brothers then sold Annandale to Edward Wienholt in 1881; Wienholt was a well-known pastoralist and held properties such as Katandra, Warenda and Saltern Creek. The property was purchased in 1896 by Sidney Kidman, the first property he purchased in Queensland; he later invested heavily in other properties throughout the channel country.

In 1911 the area was hit by a drought, with Annandale receiving only 0.18 inches (5 mm) of rain in the first seven months of the year. Between 1914 and 1916 the area was again struck by drought; about 10,000 cattle died on the station during this time. Kidman lost over 75,000 head of stock on all of his properties through the channel country including Diamantina Lakes, Durham Downs, Innamincka and Sandringham Stations. Suffering financially, Kidman sold the property in 1918; the property occupied an area of 2,574 square miles (6,667 km^{2}) at this time.

== See also ==
- List of ranches and stations
