= Gidgealpa, South Australia =

Locality in South Australia

Gidgealpa
- Suburb
- Coordinates: 28.029°S 140.237°E
- Country: Australia
- State: South Australia
- LGA: Pastoral Unincorporated Area
- Location: 780 km (480 mi) north-east of Adelaide; 58 km (36 mi) south-west of Innamincka
- Established: 2013

Government
  - State electorate: Stuart
  - Federal division: Grey

Population
  - Total: 179 (shared with adjoining localities) (2016 census) (Note: For the 2016 census, the 'State Suburb of Gidgealpa' consisted of the localities of Cordillo Downs, Gidgealpa, Innamincka (minus the Government Town of Innamincka) and Pandie Pandie.)
- Time zone: UTC+9:30 (ACST)
  - Summer (DST): UTC+10:30 (ACST)
- Postcode: 5731
- Mean max temp: 29.6 °C (85.3 °F)
- Mean min temp: 15.6 °C (60.1 °F)
- Annual rainfall: 170.1 mm (6.70 in)
Suburbs around Gidgealpa
Clifton Hills Station	Innamincka	Innamincka
Mungeranie	Gidgealpa	Innamincka
Mulka; Strzelecki Desert	Strzelecki Desert; Merty Merty	Merty Merty
- Location; Adjoining localities

Gidgealpa is a locality in the Australian state of South Australia located about 780 kilometres (480 miles) north-east of the capital city of Adelaide and about 58 kilometres (36 miles) south-west of the town of Innamincka.

The locality was established on 26 April 2013 in respect to “the long established local name.” Its name is derived from the former pastoral lease.

The locality includes the company town of Moomba and the Moomba Airport. The Strzelecki Track passes through the locality.

The principal land uses within the locality are primary production and conservation with the former being associated with the exploration for and the production of petroleum, and the latter concerning the Coongie Lakes Ramsar site which is located on the north-west side of the locality.

Gidgealpa is located within the federal Division of Grey, the state electoral district of Stuart, the Pastoral Unincorporated Area of South Australia and the state’s Far North region.
