= Durrie Station =

Pastoral lease and cattle station in Queensland

Coordinates: 25.67472°S 140.23200°E

Location in Queensland

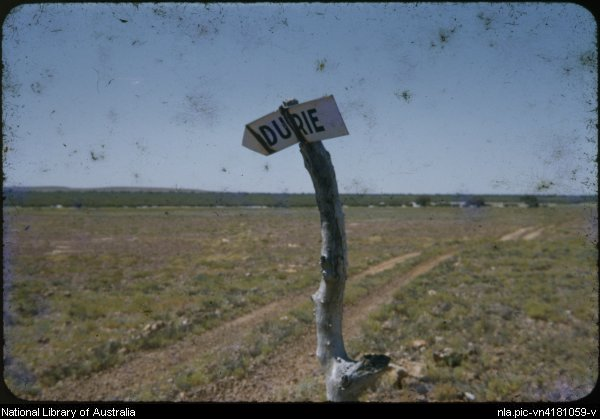
Signpost to Durrie Station 1950

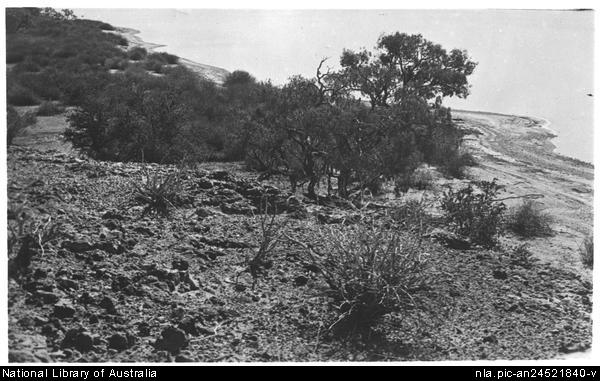
Diamantina River at Durrie 1937

Durrie Station is a pastoral lease that operates as a cattle station in Queensland, Australia.

== Description ==
Durrie is situated about 91 kilometres (57 mi) east of Birdsville and 230 kilometres (143 mi) north of Innamincka. The Diamantina River and several of its associated tributaries run through the property. The 292 square kilometres (113 sq mi) Diamantina overflow swamp is situated on Durrie, the swamp is a DIWA nationally important wetland.

The property occupies an area of 6,600 square kilometres (2,548 sq mi) in the Channel Country of far west Queensland. As of 2012 it was being stocked with 9,000 head of cattle in an average season.

== History ==
The traditional owners of the area are the Karuwali people, who have lived in the area for tens of thousands of years. Karuwali is a language of far western Queensland. The Karuwali language region includes the landscape within the local government boundaries of the Diamantina Shire Council, including the localities of Betoota and Haddon Corner.

The area was first investigated for pastoral purposes by British colonists in 1873, when Robert Collins travelled through the region. John Conrick, who explored the region in 1874, recorded that a recent Native Police raid had resulted in the deaths of 43 Aboriginal people near Thundaperty waterhole. Two main runs were formed not long after: the Thundaperty lease taken up by John Mack in 1876, and the Cooningheera lease to William and John Hastie Howie in about 1877. These stations were formed around the two main waterholes in the region, both of which had been well populated by Aboriginal people.

In 1879, the cook at Cooningheera, which was then part of the Nurdah (Murgah) run, was killed by Aboriginal men for interfering with local women. A stockman named John "Johnny-cake" Miller escaped being speared and rode 90 miles to the nearest Native Police camp at McKinlay Downs. Miller led Sub-Inspectors Henry Gough and Henry Kaye and their troopers back to Cooningheera, from where they conducted an extensive punitive expedition, culminating in two large massacres of Aboriginal people killing an estimated 60 people. "Johnny-cake" Miller later became a famous station manager for Sidney Kidman, while Sub-Inspector Henry Kaye was killed in a skirmish with Aboriginal people in 1881 in the north of the colony.

Durrie station was consolidated from the Thundaperty, Cooningheera and other neighbouring leases in the 1890s, when it was feared that ticks from cattle in the Northern Territory would infect the Queensland herd unless a quarantine line, which included Durrie, was formed.

In around 1908, when it consisted of an area of 2,000 square miles (5,180 km^{2}), Durrie was taken up by William Naughton, a prominent pastoralist of the time, who stocked it over the course of two years with 8,000 head of cattle.

Sidney Kidman acquired Durrie in 1913 when he bought it from the Naughton Brothers. Durrie adjoined Monkira and Bluff Stations, both already owned by Kidman.

The area was struck by drought from 1913 to early 1915, resulting in the deaths of huge numbers of stock. Kidman estimated that he lost 60,000 head on his properties in the Channel Country like Durrie, Diamantina Lakes, Durham Downs, Morney Plains and Carrawilla.

Airmail delivery to remote properties in outback South Australia, New South Wales, and Queensland commenced in 1949. Durrie, along with other remote properties including Mungerannie, Clifton Hills, Glengyle, Davenport Downs, Morney Plains, Mount Leonard, Mulka, Cordillo Downs, Tanbar, Durham Downs, Nappa Merrie, Lake Pure and Naryilco were also on the route.

After heavy rains in 1950 the Diamantina floodwaters reached records levels and the homestead was inundated. The McAuley family, who were living at the homestead, had to seek higher ground, and camped on a nearby sandhill for a week until the floodwaters receded.

In 2016 S. Kidman & Co was bought by Hancock Prospecting, which is owned by Gina Rinehart. In April 2023, Durrie was sold to the Appleton Cattle Company, a family-owned beef cattle enterprise which has organic certification, along with Naryilco and Glengyle stations.

== Diamantina Overflow Swamp ==
The swamp extends over 25 kilometres (16 mi) long with a width of up to 22 kilometres (14 mi) that falls within the Diamantina catchment covering a total area of 292 square kilometres (113 sq mi). It is composed of floodplain, swamps and anastomosing channels of the Diamantina River composed of very deep grey cracking clays. The water in the swamp is fresh and remains wet well into the dry season.

The major habitats found within the area include vast areas of lignum, Muehlenbeckia florulenta, open shrubland and of sedgeland dominated by Eleocharis between the lignum.

== See also ==
- List of ranches and stations
- List of the largest stations in Australia
