= Palparara =

Coordinates: 24.81988°S 141.47928°E

Location in Queensland

Palparara Station is a pastoral lease that operates as a cattle station in the outback of Queensland.

It is situated 136 kilometres (85 mi) north west of Windorah and 245 kilometres (152 mi) north east of Birdsville. Farrar's Creek flows through the property between the Barcoo and Thomson Rivers. It once adjoined Davenport Downs, Monkira, Morney Plains, Currawilla and Connemara Stations.

== History ==
The property was established at some time prior to 1878 when it was put up for auction by the owners Messrs Caswell and Hughes. Palparara occupied approximately 3,100 square kilometres (1,200 sq mi) and was stcoked with 450 head of cattle and 15 horses.

The area was extensively flooded in 1906 with much of Palparara, owned by Dalgety and Co., being under 1.2 metres (4 ft) of water. In 1908 the property was owned by Sidney Kidman and occupied an area of 6,650 square kilometres (2,567 sq mi). Kidman sold the property in 1910 to Edmund Jowett.

By 1936, the property was being managed by Mr. Corrigan and was later put up for auction by the estate of Edmund Jowett. At this time it occupied an area of 4,190 square kilometres (1,618 sq mi) and was running a herd of approximately 5,000 head of cattle. The property attracted no bids. The property realised £11,500 including 3,500 head of cattle. It had been acquired by Kidman interests.

In 1951, Palparara was part of the Devoncourt property that occupied an area of 20,000 square kilometres (6,000 sq mi) and was being run by William Plush. Properties in the area were having a good season even though the feed did not seem so abundant.

== See also ==
- List of ranches and stations
