= Nappa Merrie =

Pastoral lease in central west Queensland

Location in Queensland

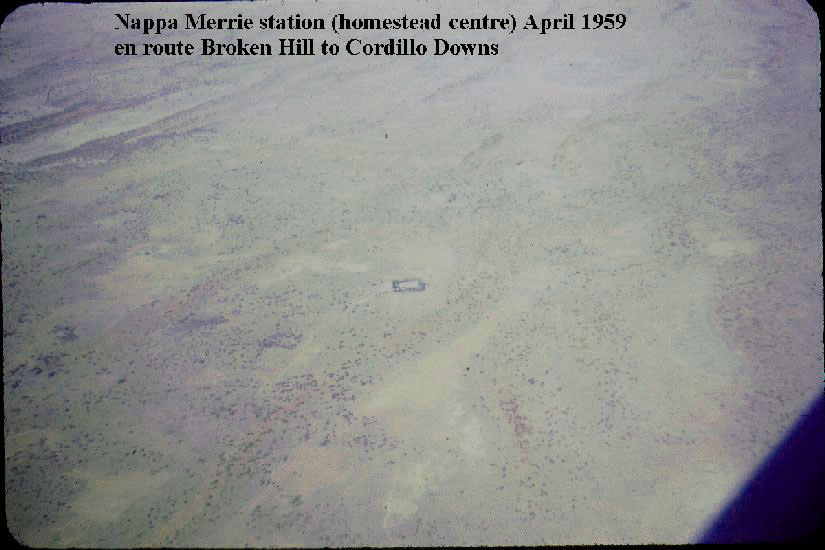
Nappa Merrie homestead in 1959

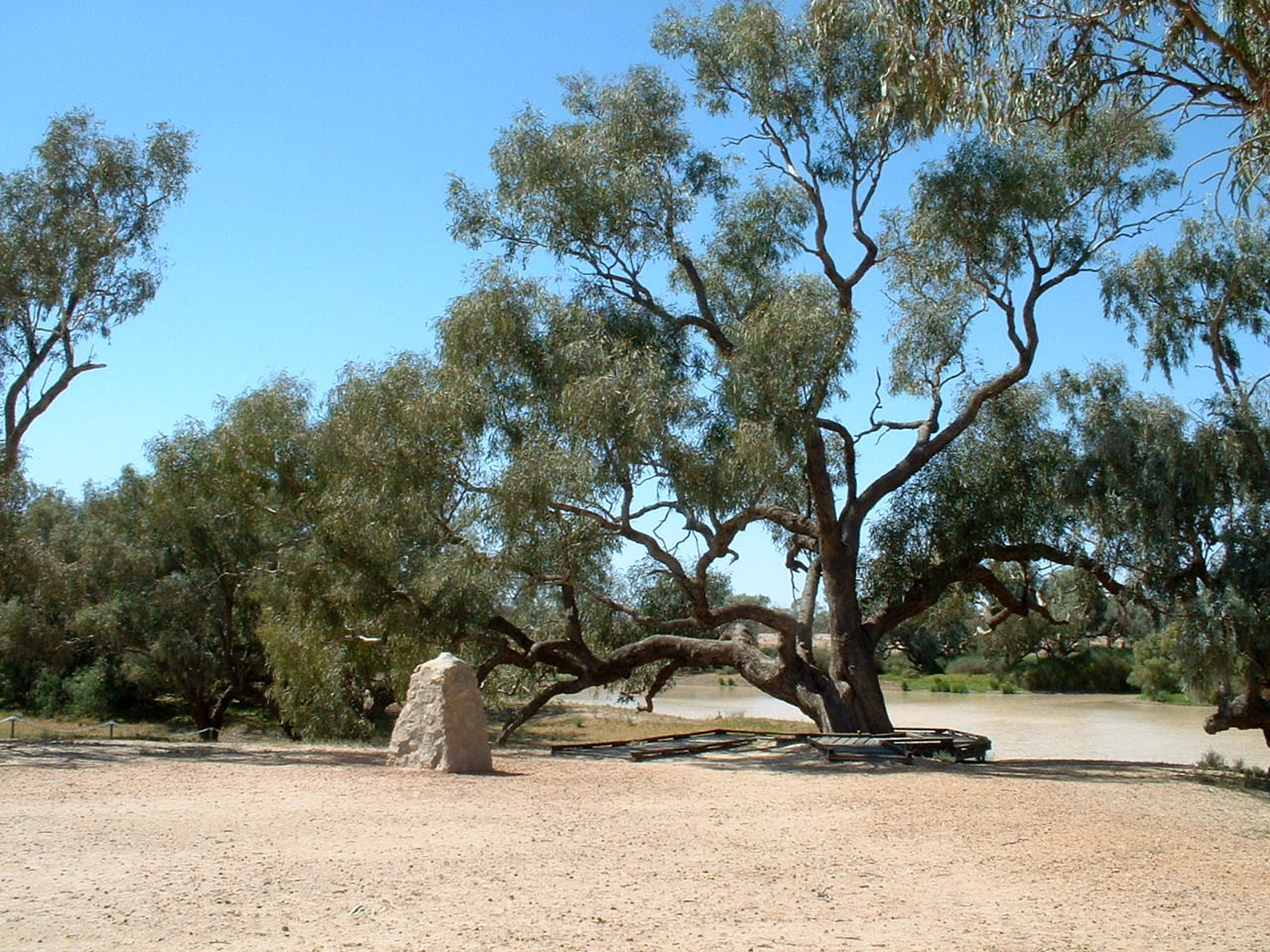
The Dig Tree on Cooper Creek

Nappa Merrie Station, most commonly known as Nappa Merrie, is a pastoral lease that operates as a cattle station in central west Queensland, Australia.

== Description ==
The property is located 40 kilometres (25 mi) north east of Innamincka and 260 kilometres (162 mi) south east of Birdsville in the Channel Country of Queensland. It has double frontage to Cooper Creek and is bounded to the west by the South Australian border.

The property has a limited number of channels through the area but is part of a natural floodplain and contains low lying swamps that provide excellent feed after floodouts that last until the dry season. The homestead has been built above and adjacent to the Nappa Merrie waterhole.

The station currently occupies an area of 7,275 square kilometres (2,809 sq mi) and is able to carry 11,000 head of cattle. It is currently owned by Morella Agriculture (David Coulton) and is managed by Peter Degoumois.

== History ==
The traditional owners of the area are the Wongkumara people. The name means "sandhill waterhole" and comes from the words ngappa meaning water and merri meaning sandhill.

British explorers started to enter the area from 1845 with the expedition led by Captain Charles Sturt. Augustus Charles Gregory journeyed through the region in 1858, while the 1860-61 Burke and Wills expedition made the area famous for the camps they made in the vicinity of ngappa merri, including the Dig Tree camp.

The pastoral station of Nappa Merrie was established along Cooper Creek in 1873 by colonist John Conrick. Conrick and five companions, all under the age of 21 and guided by Wongkumara man Jimmy Bostock, overlanded a herd of 1,600 cattle to the property from Koroit, Victoria.

Conrick initially constructed the head station at Baryulah waterhole, but after floods and violence with the numerous local Aboriginal people, he soon moved it to the Bullah Bullah waterhole where Burke and Wills had previously established their depot. In 1876, former Native Police officer John Bligh Nutting formed the Chastleton run on the north side of Cooper Creek across from Nappa Merrie. This property was named after Nutting's home town of Chastleton in England where his father had been a reverend. A Native Police detachment under Sub-Inspector Walter Cheeke was stationed at Chastleton in 1877, and committed a massacre of the resident Aboriginal population.

The Conrick family later took up the Chastleton lease, amalgamating it with Nappa Merrie. The Conricks stayed on the station for the next 83 years. From 1892 to 1934 the property was running mostly sheep with only a few cattle. Remains of fences and an old wool scour can still be found on the property. Much of the labouring at Nappa Merrie at this time was done by the remnant Wongkumara people. However, by the 1940s there was only three Aboriginal labourers present. At one point a flock of 46,000 head of sheep were grazing on the property resulting in the land collapsing and the station being vacated for a time. In the late 1940s the Tancred brothers invested in the company with Harry Tancred later appointed as the chairman of directors. Shortly afterwards the Lake Pure lease was acquired. Cattle grazing, which had been confined to the channels and wetlands, was expanded after bores were sunk in the plains away from the channel country allowing stock to roam further.

The entire area was struck by drought in 1946 with many cattle dying and properties destocking.

Airmail delivery to remote properties in outback South Australia, New South Wales and Queensland commenced in 1949. Nappa Merrie along with other remote properties including Mungerannie, Clifton Hills, Glengyle, Davenport Downs, Morney Plains, Mount Leonard, Durrie, Mulka, Tanbar, Durham Downs, Cordillo Downs, Lake Pure and Naryilco were also on the route.

Cooper Creek broke its banks in 1950 resulting in widespread flooding through the area.

In 1954 the station was sold, Nappa Merrie included the Lake Pure and Chastleton leases and occupied an area of 2,833 square miles (7,337 km^{2}) and was sold to the Playford River Pastoral Company by the Tancred Brothers and Conrick family.

Oil and gas exploration and extraction began on Nappa Merrie and the surrounding region in the latter half of the 20th Century. Construction of the large Ballera gas plant processing facility near Ballera creek on Nappa Merrie started in 1991 and was completed and upgraded in 1997.

Peter "Whip" Degoumious became the manager of Nappa Merrie in 2004 when it was still owned by the Stanbroke Pastoral Company. S. Kidman & Co. took up the lease in 2007 for a seven-year period.

Bushfires swept through the area in late 2011 burning a large portion of the station resulting in the loss of feed for stock.

In November 2016, the property was purchased by Morella Agriculture.

== Dig Tree ==
Approximately 30,000-35,000 people enter Nappa Merrie every year to visit the heritage-listed Burke and Wills Dig Tree, situated on a small reserve held in the name of the Royal Historical Society of Queensland. The tree was made famous for its part in the Burke and Wills expedition and is situated near Bullah Bullah waterhole, part of Cooper Creek about 6 kilometres (3.7 mi) from the station homestead.

== Climate ==
Nappa Merrie has a subtropical desert climate (Köppen: BWh). The settlement experiences very hot, slightly wetter summers and mild, very dry winters.

Climate data for Nappa Merrie (Ballera Gas Field) (27.40°S 141.81°E, 115 m (377 ft) m AMSL) (2000-2025 data)
Month	Jan	Feb	Mar	Apr	May	Jun	Jul	Aug	Sep	Oct	Nov	Dec	Year
Record high °C (°F)	47.8 (118.0)	47.1 (116.8)	45.1 (113.2)	38.6 (101.5)	33.8 (92.8)	30.8 (87.4)	32.9 (91.2)	38.7 (101.7)	42.4 (108.3)	42.9 (109.2)	47.0 (116.6)	46.8 (116.2)	47.8 (118.0)
Mean daily maximum °C (°F)	39.8 (103.6)	37.9 (100.2)	34.9 (94.8)	30.1 (86.2)	24.5 (76.1)	20.5 (68.9)	20.5 (68.9)	23.7 (74.7)	28.1 (82.6)	32.6 (90.7)	35.5 (95.9)	38.1 (100.6)	30.5 (86.9)
Mean daily minimum °C (°F)	26.2 (79.2)	24.6 (76.3)	22.0 (71.6)	17.1 (62.8)	11.6 (52.9)	8.2 (46.8)	7.4 (45.3)	9.3 (48.7)	13.3 (55.9)	17.4 (63.3)	20.9 (69.6)	23.9 (75.0)	16.8 (62.2)
Record low °C (°F)	16.6 (61.9)	15.3 (59.5)	11.1 (52.0)	8.2 (46.8)	2.4 (36.3)	0.6 (33.1)	−1.1 (30.0)	2.4 (36.3)	5.2 (41.4)	7.1 (44.8)	9.1 (48.4)	13.5 (56.3)	−1.1 (30.0)
Average precipitation mm (inches)	26.4 (1.04)	21.4 (0.84)	37.5 (1.48)	10.3 (0.41)	10.5 (0.41)	13.5 (0.53)	6.7 (0.26)	8.0 (0.31)	12.6 (0.50)	10.7 (0.42)	23.2 (0.91)	12.1 (0.48)	194.6 (7.66)
Average precipitation days (≥ 1.0 mm)	3.0	2.0	2.7	0.9	1.1	1.6	1.2	0.8	1.5	1.6	2.7	1.9	21.0
Source: Bureau of Meteorology (2000-2025 data)

== See also ==
- List of ranches and stations
- List of the largest stations in Australia
