= Adria Downs =

Pastoral lease in Queensland, Australia

Coordinates: 25.90°S 138.94°E

Location in Queensland

Adria Downs Station is a pastoral lease that operates as a cattle station in the outback of Queensland.

It is situated approximately 100 kilometres (60 mi) west of Birdsville bordering the Simpson Desert National Park. The Georgina River flows through the property in channels that are approximately 60 centimetres (24 in) deep but spread out on floodplains over 20 kilometres (12 mi) wide. The river eventually runs into Lake Muncooney which is also situated within the lease.

The property occupies an area of 8,750 square kilometres (3,378 sq mi) and the current owner is David Brook and the current manager is Don Rayment. In 2012 the property was running 16,000 head of organic cattle.

The property was established in 1912 and in 1916 was owned by Macdonald and Alexander and managed by Clarence Miller.

The Brook family have lived in the area since the 1880s when David's great-grandparents were married in Birdsville. His grandfather managed Annandale Station for Sidney Kidman in the 1900s. His father, Bill Brook, worked on Cordillo Downs Station but in 1942 he acquired a 200-square-mile (518 km^{2}) block of waterless land west of Birdsville known as Adria Downs.

The Brook family acquired other surrounding leases such as Annandale which were incorporated into the Adria Downs lease.

David Brook entered the organic market in 1997 when he founded OBE Organic along with 32 other family farmers in the area, with a combined herd of approximately 90,000 head of cattle. His son also runs Cordillo Downs Station and his daughter, based in Hong Kong, runs the export side of the business.

== See also ==
- List of ranches and stations
- List of the largest stations in Australia
