= Quinyambie =

Human settlement in South Australia

Coordinates: 30.21388°S 140.99405°E

Location in South Australia

Quinyambie or Quinyambie Station is a pastoral lease currently operating as a cattle station.

== Description ==
It is located about 198 kilometres (123 mi) north of Broken Hill and 242 kilometres (150 mi) north east of Blinman in the state of South Australia. Once owned by Sidney Kidman, the property is the third largest station in South Australia. The unusual name is an aboriginal word for excreta.

== History ==
The station was established prior to 1886, and was owned in that year by Mr H. T. Whitty who was running sheep on the property, later moving 6,070 sheep from the property in 1887. A carpenter employed at Quinyambie committed suicide by hanging himself after only one week on the job in 1888.

The surrounding areas were denuded of feed following a rabbit plague in 1895, Quinyambie was spared as it was protected to the west by the border rabbit proof fence and to the north by 6 miles (10 km) of netting running at right angles to the border fence. The average rainfall on the leasehold for 1896 to 1899 was only 5 inches (127 mm) per annum, prompting the Minister of lands to grant very liberal concessions to leaseholders in the area, particularly remission of rents.

Sidney Kidman acquired the property in 1916 when its size was estimated at 5,000 square miles (1,294,994 ha). Although the 1916 season had been an excellent one, with tall grasses and full waterholes, the region suffered from drought for the next couple of years.

In 1923 over 4,500 head of cattle were purchased from Naryilco for the purpose of restocking Quinyambie, it was thought to be one of the biggest cattle deals of the time. By 1924 the area was being plagued by dingos, Quinyambie had been carrying flocks of up to 20,000 sheep but since the pest arrived numbers had dropped substantially.

A fire destroyed the homestead in 1945.

Following an outbreak of pleuro-pneumonia in the cattle at nearby Lake Frome Station, Quinyambie and other surrounding properties were placed under quarantine in 1950. It was estimated that 2,000 cattle were infected. Quinyambie and the surrounding district suffered from a prolonged four year drought from 1950 to 1954, which was broken by good falls late that year, with 0.7 inches (18 mm) falling in one day.

Quinyambie was placed on the market in June 2010 when it was stocked with only 1,430 cattle. The maximum herd size is 11,000 head with an average of 9,000 head. The station was advertised as having over 3,000,000 acres (12,141 km^{2}) of outstanding feed cover. The property was sold July 2010 to the Mutooroo Pastoral Company, run by the Morgan and Wells families, who own the adjoining Mulyungarie Station and other property in the region. Mulyungarie was running between 3,000 and 4,000 head of cattle and shares a 110 kilometres (68 mi) boundary fence with Quinyambie. It was believed that the sale price was between $8 million and $10 million.

The land occupying the extent of the Quinyambie pastoral lease was gazetted by the Government of South Australia as a locality in April 2013 under the name 'Quinyambie'.

== See also ==
- List of ranches and stations
- List of the largest stations in Australia
