= Alexander Salmond =

Alexander Salmond may refer to:

- Alex Salmond (1954–2024), Scottish politician
- Alexander Hutchinson Salmond (1850–1924), Australian surveyor

== See also ==
- Alexander Salmon (disambiguation)
