= List of the largest stations in Australia =

Australia's largest farms (stations) list

This is a list of the largest stations in Australia, which includes stations with an area in excess of 4,000 km^{2} (1,500 mi^{2}).

All of the largest pastoral leases are located in the states of Queensland (Qld), South Australia (SA) and Western Australia (WA); or in the Northern Territory (NT).

The vast majority are cattle stations, with no sheep stations among the ten largest. Most of the properties are owned by pastoral companies such as Australian Agricultural Company, Consolidated Pastoral Company, S Kidman & Company, North Australian Pastoral Company, Heytesbury, Paraway Pastoral Company and the Jumbuck Pastoral Company.

This list includes the stations in Australia by virtue of area:

Rank	Station	State	Area (km^{2})	Area (mi^{2})	Area (acre)	Stock	Year est.	Notes	References
1	Anna Creek	SA	23,677	9,140	5,850,000	Cattle	1863	Grazed sheep originally, world's largest station. Area includes both Anna Creek and the Peake outstation combined.	
2	Clifton Hills	SA	17,000	6,560	4,200,000	Cattle	before 1881	Second largest station in SA	
3	Alexandria	NT	16,116	6,220	3,980,000	Cattle	1877	Largest station in NT	
4	Davenport Downs	Qld	15,100	5,830	3,730,000	Cattle	before 1878	Largest station in Queensland. Area includes both Davenport Downs and Springvale station combined.	
5	Home Valley	WA	14,164	5,470	3,500,000	Cattle	1926	Largest station in WA. Area includes Home Valley, Karunjie and Durack River stations combined. Owned by Indigenous Land Corporation.	
6	Innamincka	SA	13,552	5,230	3,350,000	Cattle	1872	Third largest station in SA. Size once estimated at 10,000 sq mi (25,900 km^{2})	
7	Wave Hill	NT	13,500	5,210	3,340,000	Cattle	1883	Second largest station in NT	
8	Marion Downs	Qld	12,460	4,810	3,080,000	Cattle	before 1878	Second largest station in Queensland	
9	Brunette Downs	NT	12,212	4,720	3,020,000	Cattle	1883	Third largest station in NT	
10	Quinyambie	SA	12,141	4,690	3,000,000	Cattle	1872	Area quoted is maximum figure quoted as nearly 3 million acres	
11	De Grey Station	WA	12,141	4,690	3,000,000	Cattle	1869	Second largest station in WA. Area figure may be disputed, in 1886 the area quoted was "nearly three millions of acres", and would include the Pardoo outstation	
12	Lake Nash	NT	12,000	4,630	2,970,000	Cattle	before 1879	Area includes the Lake Nash, Georgina Downs and Argadargada leases.	
13	Macumba	SA	11,063	4,270	2,730,000	Cattle	before 1874		
14	Andado	NT	10,850	4,190	2,680,000	Cattle	1880		
15	Bulloo Downs	Qld	10,700	4,130	2,640,000	Cattle	1884		
15	Newcastle Waters	NT	10,353	4,000	2,560,000	Cattle	1883	Area includes the Powell Creek and Tandyidgee pastoral leases.	
16	Helen Springs	NT	10,198	3,940	2,520,000	Cattle	before 1885	Area includes both Helen Springs and Brunchilly outstation combined.	
17	Rawlinna	WA	10,117	3,910	2,500,000	Sheep	1962	Largest sheep station in WA, Australia and World	
18	Headingly Station	Qld	10,032	3,870	2,480,000	Cattle	1881	Area includes Headingly, Carandotta and Wolgra leases	
19	Commonwealth Hill Station	SA	10,000	3,860	2,470,000	Sheep	1890	Area includes both Commonwealth Hill and Mobella outstation combined. Biggest sheep station in SA, second largest sheep station in Australia	
20	Walhallow Station	NT	9,997	3,860	2,470,000	Cattle	1881		
21	Ruby Plains	WA	9,674	3,740	2,390,000	Cattle	1889	Area includes both Ruby Plains and Sturt Creek outstation combined.	
22	Anthony Lagoon & Eva Downs	NT	9,349	3,610	2,310,000	Cattle	?	Both Anthony Lagoon and Eva Downs operate as one entity	
23	Strathmore	Qld	9,310	3,590	2,300,000	Cattle	?	Largest single pastoral lease in Queensland	
24	Durham Downs	Qld	8,910	3,440	2,200,000	Cattle	1873		
25	Victoria River Downs	NT	8,900	3,440	2,200,000	Cattle	1880	At one time was the largest station in Australia and the world covering 41,000 km^{2}	
26	Adria Downs	Qld	8,750	3,380	2,160,000	Cattle	before 1912		
27	Nockatunga	Qld	8,500	3,280	2,100,000	Cattle	1870		
28	Tanbar	Qld	8,300	3,200	2,050,000	Cattle	before 1884		
29	Manners Creek	NT	8,090	3,120	2,000,000	Cattle	1880		
29	Cordillo Downs	SA	7,800	3,010	1,930,000	Cattle	1872	Grazed sheep until 1942 and was once regarded as Australia's largest sheep station.	
30	Dunbar	Qld	7,770	3,000	1,920,000	Cattle	before 1883		
31	Arrabury	Qld	7,600	2,930	1,880,000	Cattle	before 1887		
32	Naryilco	Qld	7,510	2,900	1,860,000	Cattle	before 1880		
33	Mount Doreen	NT	7,337	2,830	1,810,000	Cattle	1932		
34	Nappa Merrie	Qld	7,275	2,810	1,800,000	Cattle	1871		
35	Todmorden Station	SA	7,169	2,768	1,771,000	Cattle			
36	Madura	WA	7,082	2,730	1,750,000	Sheep	1876	Originally settled to breed horses for British Army in India	
37	Gogo	WA	7,082	2,730	1,750,000	Cattle	1885		
38	Billa Kalina	SA	7,000	2,700	1,730,000	Cattle	?	Includes the Miller's Creek lease.	
39	Mittiebah	NT	6,955	2,690	1,720,000	Cattle	1877		
40	Glenormiston	Qld	6,920	2,670	1,710,000	Cattle	before 1881		
41	Balfour Downs	WA	6,800	2,630	1,680,000	Cattle	before 1910		
42	Durrie Station	Qld	6,600	2,550	1,630,000	Cattle	before 1908		
43	Moola Bulla	WA	6,600	2,550	1,630,000	Cattle	1910		
44	Stuart Creek	SA	6,500	2,510	1,610,000	Cattle			
45	Milly Milly	WA	6,475	2,500	1,600,000	Sheep	before 1879	Also has a small herd of cattle	
46	Coorabulka	Qld	6,370	2,460	1,570,000	Cattle	before 1882		
47	Morney Plains	Qld	6,240	2,410	1,540,000	Cattle	before 1876		
48	Etadunna	Qld	6,216	2,400	1,540,000	Cattle	before 1867		
49	Tobermorey	NT	5,994	2,310	1,480,000	Cattle	before 1911		
50	Mount Margaret	Qld	5,990	2,310	1,480,000	Cattle	before 1925	Has also previously been used for grazing sheep	
51	Keeroongooloo	Qld	5,814	2,240	1,440,000	Cattle	1871	Has also previously been used for grazing horses when established	
52	Mulka	SA	5,600	2,160	1,380,000	Cattle	before 1889		
53	Elsey	NT	5,334	2,060	1,320,000	Cattle	1879	The station that inspired the story and film We of the Never Never	
54	Henbury	NT	5,273	2,040	1,300,000	Cattle	1875	Became a conservation area in 2011	
55	Limbunya	NT	5,222	2,020	1,290,000	Cattle	before 1923		
56	Argadargada	NT	5,139	1,980	1,270,000	Cattle	1951		
57	Diamantina Lakes	Qld	5,070	1,960	1,250,000	Cattle	1876	Now a National Park	
58	Meda	WA	5,059	1,950	1,250,000	Cattle	before 1883		
59	Tanumbirini	NT	5,001	1,930	1,240,000	Cattle	before 1908		
60	South Galway Station	Qld	4,876	1,880	1,200,000	Cattle	Before 1884		
61	Calvert Hills Station	NT	4,814	1,860	1,190,000	Cattle			
62	Three Rivers	WA	4,800	1,850	1,190,000	Sheep	1884		
63	Wilgena	SA	4,742	1,830	1,170,000	Sheep	before 1909	Once used to graze cattle	
64	Austral Downs	NT	4,692	1,810	1,160,000	Cattle	1883		
65	Canobie	Qld	4,291	1,660	1,060,000	Cattle	1864		
66	Alroy Downs	NT	4,232	1,630	1,050,000	Cattle	1877		
67	Tanami Downs	NT	4,200	1,620	1,040,000	Cattle	before 1911	Formerly known as Mongrel Downs	
68	Auvergne	NT	4,142	1,600	1,020,000	Cattle	before 1886		
69	Curtin Springs	NT	4,050	1,560	1,000,000	Cattle	1930s		
70	Millungera	Qld	4,047	1,560	1,000,000	Cattle	1880		
71	Drysdale River	WA	4,047	1,560	1,000,000	Cattle	1882		
72	Banjawarn	WA	4,047	1,560	1,000,000	Sheep	1903		
73	El Questro Wilderness Park	WA	4,047	1,560	1,000,000	Cattle	1903	The park still runs 8,000 head of cattle.	
74	Louisa Downs	WA	4,000	1,540	988,000	Cattle	before 1933		
75	Noonkanbah	WA	4,000	1,540	988,000	Cattle	1880s		

== See also ==
- List of ranches and stations § Australia
- List of pastoral leases in the Northern Territory
- List of pastoral leases in Western Australia
- Pastoral lease
