= Ernest William Castine =

South Australian farmer and politician (1869–1955)

Ernest William Castine (26 November 1869 – 8 February 1955) was a pastoralist and politician in the State of South Australia.

== History ==
Castine was born at "Prospect Cottage", Auburn, the son of Colonel John William Castine (member for Wooroora from 1884 to 1902) and Nannie Castine (née Barkla). He was educated at Riverton Public School and Prince Alfred College. For a time he ran a store in Auburn, then a 1,600 acres (650 ha) property "Penobscot" at Watervale and an 11,000 acres (4,500 ha) grazing property near Quorn. He was also managing director of Andamooka Pastoral Company running 11,000 square miles (28,000 km^{2}) and was partner with Sidney Kidman in Morney Plains Station in Queensland.

== Politics ==
He was chairman of the Upper Wakefield District Council in 1932. He was selected by the Liberal and Country League to contest the 1933 Legislative Council election for the Midland district in 1933. He was successful and held the seat unopposed until 1947, when he was dis-endorsed by his Party in favor of D. P. Gordon. He nevertheless stood as an Independent, but was defeated at the polls.

== Other interests ==
He was secretary of the Northern Agricultural Society, a member of the board of the Clare and District Hospital. He played cricket, golf and bowls, and was president of the Watervale Golf Club, and an active member of the Clare Bowling Club.

== Family ==
On 22 April 1891 he married Selma Sobels (28 April 1902 – 28 June 1922) of "Springvale", Watervale. They lived at "Penobscot" Watervale. He married again, to Miss Serena Amanda Castine Warren (his first cousin) around September 1923 in Rawmarsh, Yorkshire, England.
