= Naryilco =

Pastoral lease in Queensland

Coordinates: 28.566°S 141.915°E

Location in Queensland

Naryilco Station, also known as Naryilco Downs, is a pastoral lease in Queensland, Australia, that operates as a cattle station.

== Description ==
It is located about 98 kilometres (61 mi) north of Tibooburra and 146 kilometres (91 mi) south east of Innanincka in the Channel Country of outback Queensland. It consists of mulga ridges interspersed with cotton bush and saltbush flats with large areas of Mitchell grass and other herbage. A large creek runs through the property which is also well watered by Lake Naryilco, Arramerterry and Yulamatina. The property adjoins Bulloo Downs Station.

Naryilco occupies an area of 7,510 square kilometres (2,900 sq mi). As of 2012 it had a carrying capacity of 12,000 head of cattle, and was being managed by Ian Halstead.

== History ==
Mr. L. W. Bate owned the property in 1880 when he sold the property complete with cattle and plant to Alexander Cormack and Co. for a satisfactory price. The property was divided into 16 blocks comprising an area of approximately 1,125 square miles (2,914 km^{2}) of country.

Naryilco was advertised again in 1882, at this stage it occupied an area of 850 square miles (2,201 km^{2}). In 1885 it was advertised again this time stocked with 3,500 head of cattle and 6,000 sheep. Cormack was found to be insolvent in 1887 and Naryilco was placed on the market again. At this stage it occupied an area of 1,550 square miles (4,014 km^{2}) and was carrying 30,000 head of sheep and 2,500 head of cattle.

The station was acquired by A. McDonald in 1905.

In 1923 over 4,500 head of cattle were purchased from Naryilco for the purpose of restocking Quinyambie, it was thought to be one of the biggest cattle deals of the time.

Airmail delivery to remote properties in outback South Australia, New South Wales, and Queensland commenced in 1949. Naryilco along with other remote properties including Mungerannie, Clifton Hills, Glengyle, Davenport Downs, Morney Plains, Mount Leonard, Durrie, Mulka, Tanbar, Durham Downs, Nappa Merrie, Lake Pure and Cordillo Downs were also on the route.

The property was owned by S. Kidman & Co from some time before 2012 until April 2023. In 2016 [S. Kidman & Co was bought by Gina Rinehart's Hancock Prospecting. In April 2023, Durrie was sold to the Appleton Cattle Company, a family-owned beef cattle enterprise which has organic certification, along with Durrie and Glengyle stations.

== See also ==
- List of ranches and stations
- List of the largest stations in Australia
