= South Galway Station =

Pastoral lease in Queensland, Australia

Coordinates: 25.66493°S 142.10797°E

Location in Queensland

South Galway Station, often referred to as South Galway, and once known as Galway Downs, is a pastoral lease that operates as a cattle station.

== Description ==
It is located about 64 kilometres (40 mi) south west of Windorah and 275 kilometres (171 mi) east of Birdsville in the Channel Country of Queensland.

The property occupies an area of 4,876 square kilometres (1,883 sq mi) and is able to carry a herd of approximately 13,000 cattle. It is currently owned by the Australian Agricultural Company. Situated along Cooper Creek, approximately half the property is flooded river country and about one quarter is rolling downs. The remaining quarter is a mix of spinifex, red sand, mulga and hard hilly country.

== History ==
Initially established by Patrick and Michael Durack along with John Costello in 1873, the property was one of the first to be settled in the region.

The Duracks placed the property on the market in 1878, at which time it encompassed about 500 square miles (1,295 km^{2}) and was stocked with approximately 3,000 head of cattle. The property sold in about 1884 to the Queensland Cooperative Pastoral Company, who placed it on the market when it went into liquidation in 1886, along with several other properties including Thylungra, Buckingham Downs and Pikedale.

The area was struck by drought in the years 1887–1901. The property was purchased by the Schmidt family in 1937. In 1945 the station was hit by a rat plague that consumed six months worth of feed. The plague extended through the Cooper country from Windorah to Durham Downs.

In 1951, a pilot from Trans Australia Airlines was hired by the station owner to ride the range in a de Havilland Dragon to rescue a mob of cattle threatened by floods. All the cattle but 300 were driven to higher ground saving the owner £10,000. Bushfires ravaged the station later the same year with an area of over 1,000 square miles (2,590 km^{2}) being burnt out, stockmen from South Galway were at the fire front for five days in an attempt to control the blaze.

== See also ==
- List of ranches and stations
- List of the largest stations in Australia
