= Durham Downs Station =

Pastoral lease in Queensland, Australia

Coordinates: 27.07945°S 141.90858°E

Location in Queensland

Durham Downs Station, most commonly known as Durham Downs, is a pastoral lease that operates as a cattle station in Durham, Shire of Bulloo in South West Queensland, Australia. The property is situated in a remote and arid location along Cooper Creek, where it often experiences drought and floods. It was originally established in the 1870s and belongs to S. Kidman & Co, which since 2016 has been owned by Gina Rinehart.

== Description ==
Durham Downs is located about 138 kilometres (86 mi) north east of Innamincka and 200 kilometres (124 mi) south of Windorah in Queensland. Situated amongst the channel country of outback Queensland, the property includes frontage to a 43 miles (69 km) portion of Cooper Creek and its associated tributaries, including Tooratchie, Wammanooka, Warreena, Parkamlnna and Windula Creeks, and the fertile floodplain country through which they flow. Occupying an area of 8,910 square kilometres (3,440 sq mi) along with the Woomanooka outstation, it is currently owned by S. Kidman & Co.

== History ==
=== 19th century ===
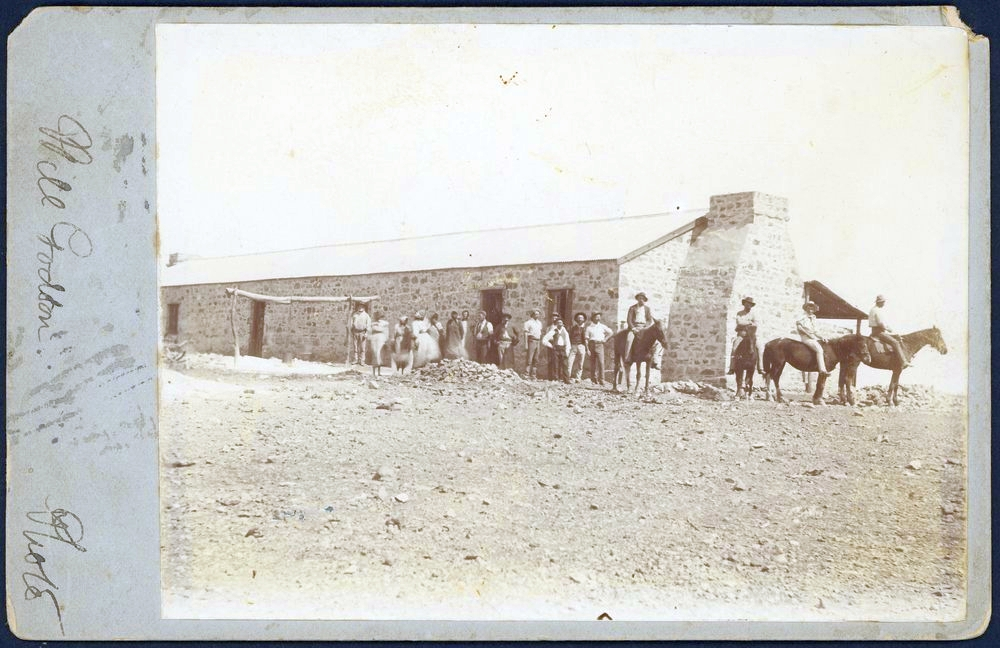
Durham Downs - shearing shed, 1878

The area just north of the station was Kungadutji land. Established prior to 1873, the property was producing quality cattle for market and Messrs McGregor and Co., who owned the station, sold a batch of 205 bullocks and cows in 1875 averaging a price of about A£11 apiece.

In 1883 the station was put up for sale, following a couple of years of drought, when the partnership between Duncan McGregor and D and R Mailler dissolved. The station was advertised as being composed of 42 blocks with an area of 2,456 square miles (6,361 km^{2}) containing over 14,000 head of cattle, 2,500 sheep and 309 horses. Duncan McGregor formed a new company and purchased the property in 1884 for A£78,582.

The sale was later the cause of a lawsuit in 1886 against the Maillers and McGregor, when Mr Edwarde and Mr Bell attempted to recover A£78,582 for a short delivery on the delivery of stock from the station. The plaintiffs complained that there were only 9,000 cattle and 400 sheep instead of 12,000 cattle and 2,000 sheep as a minimum as promised. The defendants offered a rebate of A£7,752. The court found in favour of the plaintiffs, but charges of fraud against the defendants were dropped.

=== 1900–1949 ===
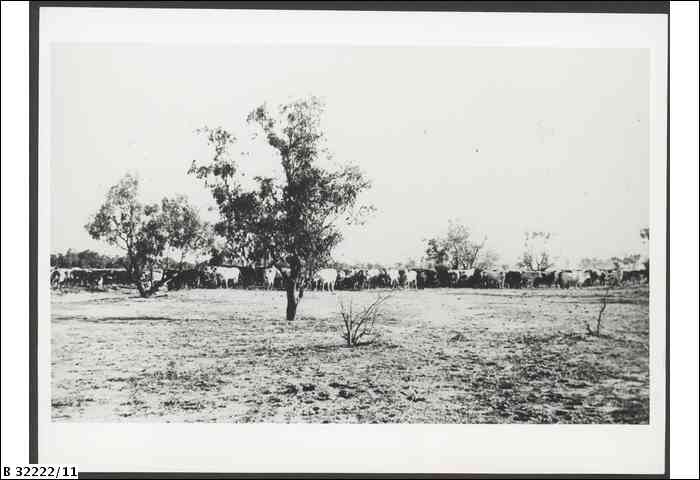
Durham Downs – cattle grazing, 1920

Cattle baron Sidney Kidman acquired Durham Downs in 1909. Kidman bought the property along with Tilbaroo, Morney Plains and Durrie Stations in Queensland, Burrawinna on the border and Macumba Station in South Australia as part of his plan of acquiring prime grazing lands along areas that the watercourses followed. He borrowed A£50,000 to pay the A£100,000 asking price.

Between 1914 and 1916 the area was struck by drought; about 10,000 cattle died on the station during this time. Kidman lost over 75,000 head of stock on all of his properties through the channel country including Diamantina Lakes, Glengyle, Innamincka and Sandringham Stations. Suffering financially, Kidman sold the property in 1918.

The southwest of Queensland was again gripped by drought in from 1927 to 1929; despite some light rains Durham Downs was still in poor condition with little feed available for stock. The drought was broken in 1930 with good rainfall, so much that the normally dry Cooper Creek flowed for a time.

The station experienced flooding in 1941 when Cooper Creek broke its banks and left a portion of the property under water. Roads out over the gibber country were still open.

In 1945, feral horses, known as brumbies in Australia, whose numbers had steadily increased during the period of World War II, were now overgrazing in the surrounding area leaving little feed available for cattle. Shooters had been employed on Durham and other surrounding properties to cull the brumbies. A shooter on Durham killed 2,200 horses by 1947, and another 8,000 were shot on three other Kidman properties in Queensland.

The entire area was struck by drought in 1946, with many cattle dying and properties destocking.

Cooper Creek flooded again in 1948 following heavy rain in northern Queensland. The floodwater took 6 weeks to reach the South Australian border, but the creek was soon impassable at Durham, Innamincka and Nappa Merrie crossings. The water was over 7 feet (2 m) deep. More severe floods occurred in 1950 when the Cooper again broke its banks causing huge washaways and delays in rail traffic.

Airmail delivery to remote properties in outback South Australia, New South Wales and Queensland commenced in 1949. Durham Downs and other remote properties, including Mungerannie, Clifton Hills, Glengyle, Davenport Downs, Morney Plains, Mount Leonard, Durrie, Mulka, Tanbar, Cordillo Downs, Nappa Merrie, Lake Pure and Naryilco, were also on the route.

=== 1950–1999 ===
The station homestead was burnt to the ground in 1952, claiming the life of the manager, Mr Stevenson. His wife and children escaped the flames and ten station stockmen attempted to battle the fire but with no success.

John "Fergie" Ferguson and his wife Jasleen arrived at Durham in 1973 to operate the property as station managers.

=== 21st century ===
The Fergusons retired in 2007.

Centenary celebrations of the Kidman acquisition of the property had to be postponed in 2010 and again in 2011 after Cooper Creek flooded following heavy rain events. Bushfires swept through the area in late 2011 with a lot of feed on the western side of the property being lost.

As of 2011 the station manager was Jon Cobb.

In 2016 S. Kidman & Co was bought by Gina Rinehart's Hancock Prospecting. By April 2023, Durham Downs was one of only four stations still owned by the company, after another four had been sold off.

== See also ==
- List of ranches and stations
- List of the largest stations in Australia
