= Drizabone =

Drizabone may refer to:

- Driza Bone, an international dance music and remixing musical group
- Driza-Bone, a company making full-length waterproof riding coats and apparel
