= Currawilla =

Pastoral lease and cattle station in Queensland

Coordinates: 25.15471°S 141.34204°E

Location in Queensland

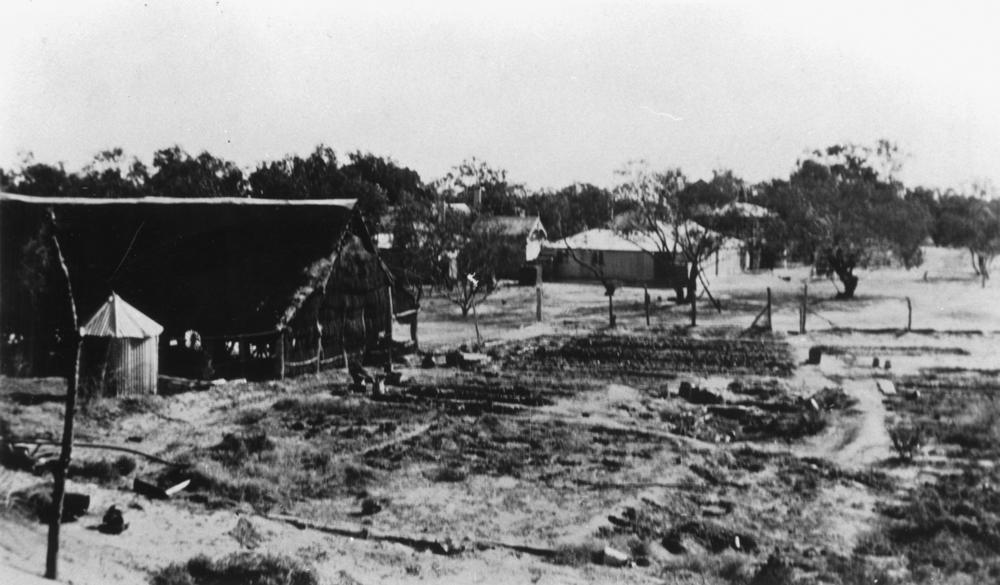
Buildings and gardens at Currawilla Station 1929

Currawilla Station is a pastoral lease that currently operates as a cattle station in Queensland.

It is located approximately 135 kilometres (84 mi) west of Windorah and 217 kilometres (135 mi) east of Birdsville in Queensland. The property adjoins Palparara and Narradunna Stations. It is situated in the Channel Country and is well watered by numerous creeks in the area. The homestead is found along the Currawilla waterhole on the Torrens Creek. Farrar's Creek also runs through the property.

It was established at some time prior to 1878, by Jack Farrar on Karuwali tribal lands. Farrar had worked at McGregor's Mount Margaret Station and kept his own herd. Farrar later left and followed the Diamantina River down the Channel Country and took up a block about 100 square miles (259 km^{2}) on Farrar's Creek and named it Currawilla after the Aboriginal name for a waterhole. Farrar later sold it to Mr Cotton who substantially increased the size of the holding.

In 1881 it was sold by Messrs Cotton and Malpas to Messrs Martin and Johnston. At this time Currawilla occupied an area of 1,300 square miles (3,367 km^{2}) and was stocked with 4,000 cattle and 60 horses. In 1887 the heaviest flooding known at the time following exceptionally heavy rains in the area, Currawilla recorded 11 inches (279 mm) over a two-day period. In 1887 the property was managed by William Henry Watson. The owners of the station in 1889 were Messrs Edward Martin and Company of Melbourne. Drought struck in 1897 but it was less severe at Currawilla compared to many surrounding properties. Eventually in 1889, Watson, who was still managing the property, bought it outright.

In 1914 Currawilla was sold by Watson to the Bergin brothers. The 1,120-square-mile (2,901 km^{2}) property was stocked with approximately 6,000 head of cattle and 150 horses.

The property currently occupies an area of 2,230 square kilometres (861 sq mi) and is owned and run by Roger and Debbie Oldfield.

== See also ==
- List of ranches and stations
