= Glengyle Station =

Pastoral lease in central west Queensland

Coordinates: 24.7848°S 139.5919°E

Location in Queensland

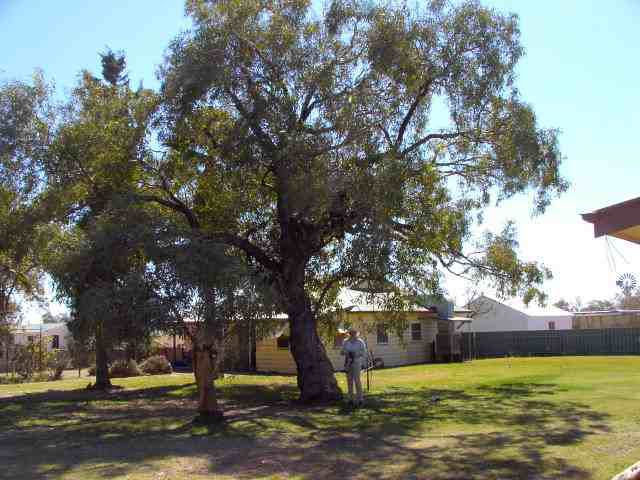
Kidman's Tree of Knowledge, 2005

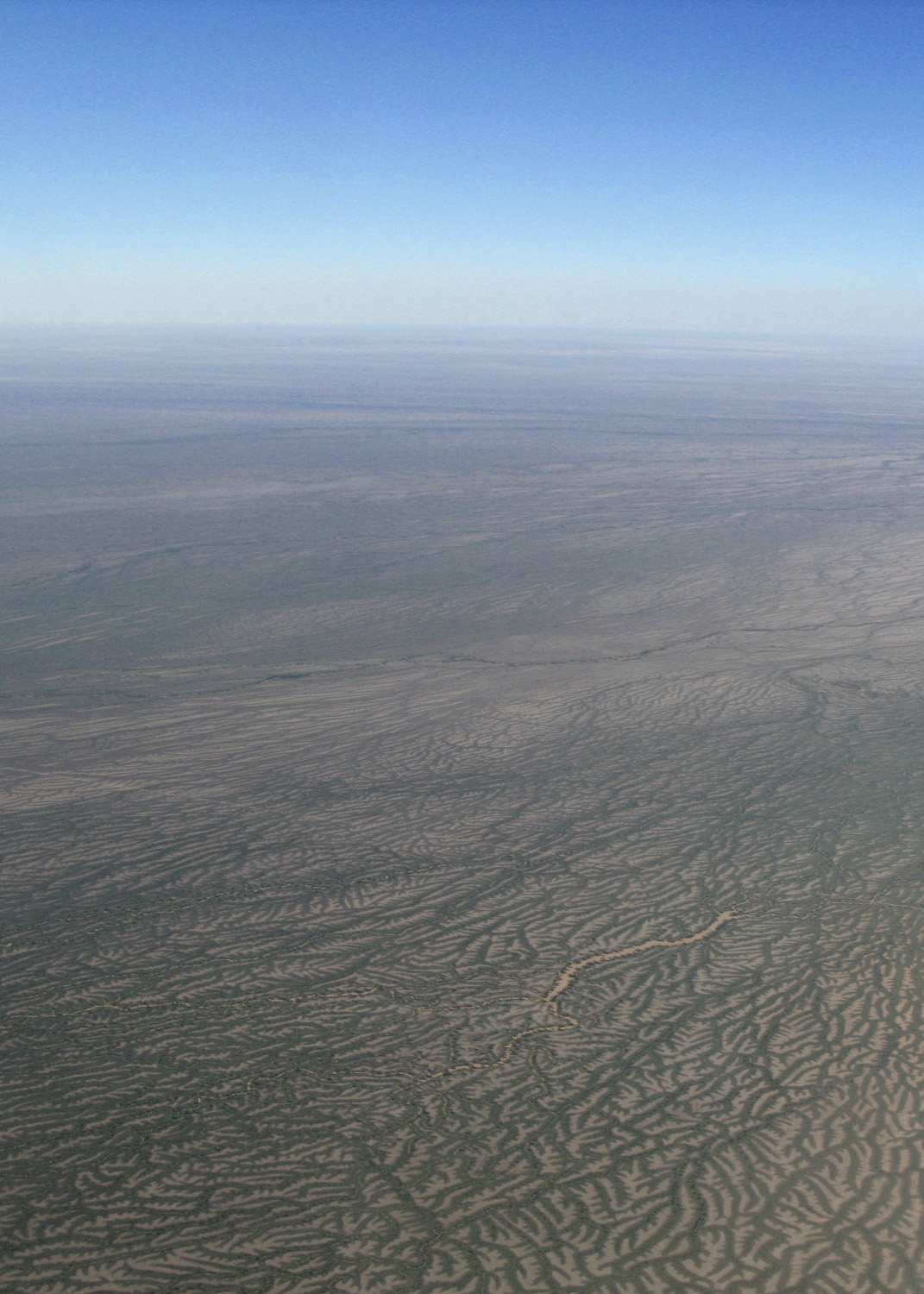
Channel Country

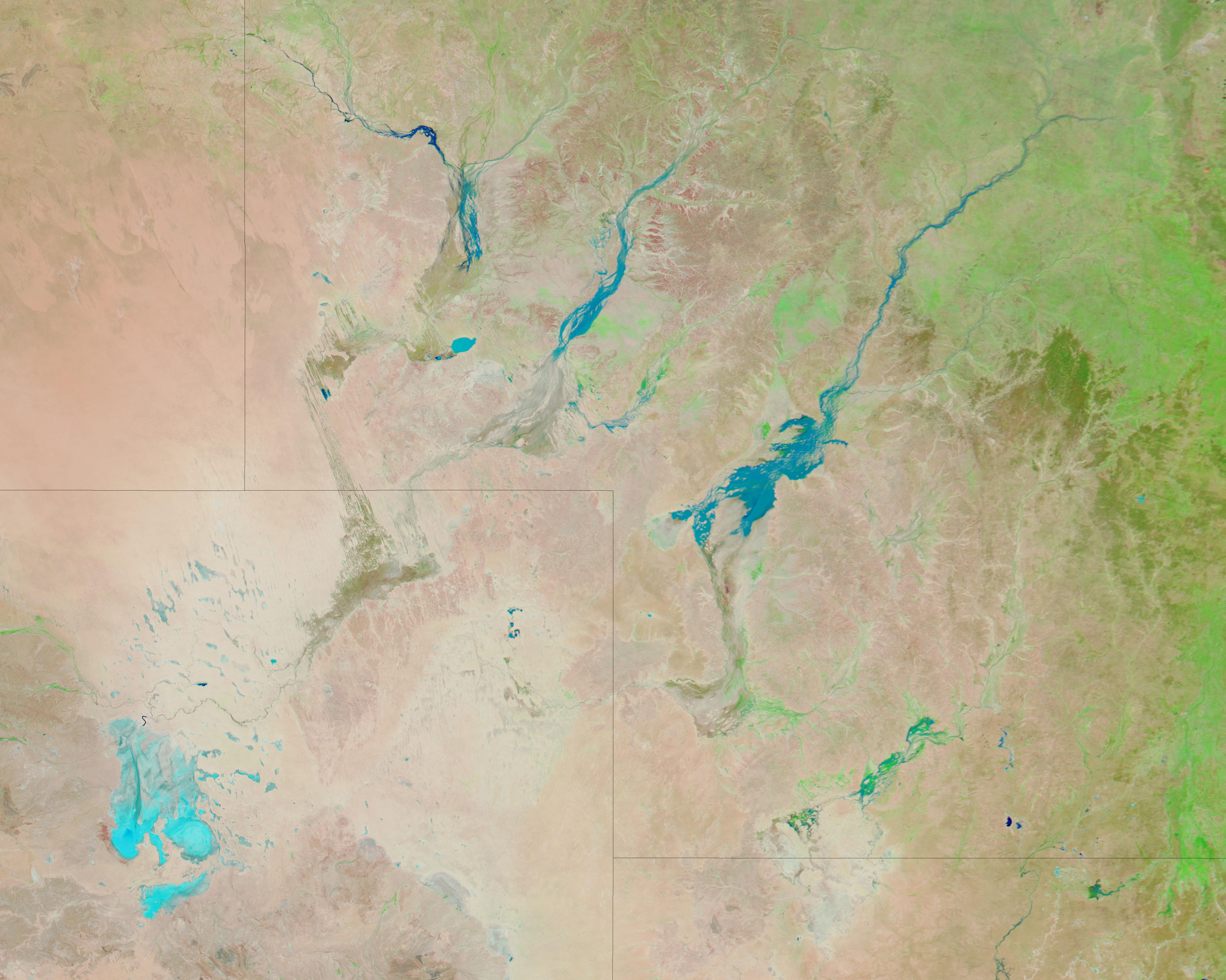
Channel Country Flooding

Glengyle Station is a pastoral lease that operates as a cattle station in central west Queensland.

== Description ==
Glengyle is located 125 kilometres (78 mi) north Birdsville and 209 kilometres (130 mi) south of Boulia in the Channel Country of Queensland.

As of 2012 the property occupied an area of 5,540 square kilometres (2,139 sq mi) and had a carrying capacity of 8,500 head of cattle. It is the site of the monument, Sidney Kidman's Tree of Knowledge, the coolibah tree which Kidman camped under when contemplating the development of his pastoral empire. Glengyle and other leases in the channel country, he realised, would be important acquisitions to link his properties in the Northern Territory to markets further south while still providing feed and water.

The Georgina River and other tributaries such as Eyre Creek run through the middle of the property and mostly carries water down from the north during the wet season. Water can take as long as three months to travel 35 kilometres (22 mi) across a paddock, called Bunkhole, as it must fill two lakes. The lakes, named Koolya and Miria, are each circular and about 50 square kilometres (19 sq mi) in area. Further downstream lies Lake Machattie which also usually fills then the floodwaters spread out across the maze of lignum lines black soil channels. About one third of the property is flood plain which with adequate water is well vegetated by Cooper clover in winter and native sorghum in summer, another third is sandhill country with the remaining third made up of gibber plain that supports Mitchell grass following summer rains.

== History ==
The station was established in 1876 by Duncan Macgregor one of the first in the region along with Annandale, Kaliduwarry, and Sandringham Stations. Macgregor held on to the property for the next 20 years and also acquired nearby Cacory Station.

William Buchanan acquired the 1,000 square miles (2,590 km^{2}) station in 1907. He intended to stock up from his Wave Hill Station in the Northern Territory, 4,000 head of cattle were immediately dispatched with Glengyle to be in good condition with plenty of feed and water.

The property was sold the trustees of the Buchanan Estate in 1912 to Sidney Kidman.

Between 1914 and 1916 the area was struck by drought, about 10,000 cattle died on the station during this time. Kidman lost over 75,000 head of stock on all of his properties through the channel country including Diamantina Lakes, Durham Downs, Innamincka and Sandringham Stations. Suffering financially, Kidman sold the property in 1918.

The manager of the station, Albert Edwards, estimated the area of the holding in 1921 was 1,000 square miles (2,590 km^{2}) with a total area of 7,000 square miles (18,130 km^{2}) including outstations. The property was carrying 25,000 head of cattle and 1,000 horses.

In 1929 a bore was sunk at Glengyle to a depth of 2,380 feet (725 m) before striking a good flow of artesian water The flow rate was measured at 750,000 imperial gallons (3 ML) per day and cost Kidman A£6,000.

Airmail delivery to remote properties in outback South Australia, New South Wales and Queensland commenced in 1949. Glengyle along with other remote properties including Mungerannie, Clifton Hills, Mulka, Davenport Downs, Morney Plains, Mount Leonard, Durrie, Cordillo Downs, Tanbar, Durham Downs, Nappa Merrie, Lake Pure and Naryilco were also on the route.

The Georgina River flooded in 1950 and again in 1953 following heavy rain events further north. The 1953 flood was 6 inches (152 mm) higher at Glengyle compared to the 1950 event. The Diamantina River was also in flood and the waters were expected to make it to Lake Eyre.

Glengyle is the end of the world's longest mail run that is about a 2,000 kilometres (1,243 mi) round trip. The run starts at Port Augusta and finishes at Glengyle an includes other properties such as Anna Creek and Durrie Stations.

The station, and much of the channel country, resembled an inland sea in March 2011 when flood waters flowed down from the north following Cyclone Yasi. The floodwater were over 20 kilometres (12 mi) wide down the creek channels and were over 1.5 feet (0.5 m) higher than the floods recorded in 2009, the highest seen before, that filled Lake Eyre.

In 2013, the station was struck by drought again, requiring water to be piped 50 kilometres (31 mi), at a cost of A$100,000, from a bore to the homestead once the water in the dams had run dry.

The property was owned by S. Kidman & Co from some time before 2012 until April 2023. In 2016 S. Kidman & Co was bought by Gina Rinehart's Hancock Prospecting. In April 2023, Durrie was sold to the Appleton Cattle Company, a family-owned beef cattle enterprise which has organic certification, along with Naryilco and Durrie stations.

== See also ==
- List of ranches and stations
