= Karuwali =

Aboriginal Australian people of Queensland

The Karuwali are an Aboriginal Australian people of the state of Queensland.

== Country ==
Norman Tindale estimated that the Karuwalis' lands extended over some 12,000 square miles (31,000 km^{2}) of territory. This took in the area about Farrars Creek near Connemara southwards to Beetoota, Haddon Corner, and Morney Plains. Their eastern extension went to the Beal range while the western frontier was around Durrie and Monkira on the Diamantina River.

== History of contact ==
The Karuwali have been cited as an Australian instance of the practice of colonial genocide.

== Alternative names ==
- Karawalla
- Gara-wali
- Kurrawulla
- Karorinje
- Kuriwalu
- Goore

== Notable people ==
- Moses Yoolpee (c. 1865 - 1940) an Karuwali/Mithaka elder, stockman and tracker and translator.

== Sources ==
- Tindale, Norman Barnett (1974). "Karuwali (QLD)". Aboriginal Tribes of Australia: Their Terrain, Environmental Controls, Distribution, Limits, and Proper Names. Australian National University Press. ISBN 978-0-708-10741-6.
- Watson, Pamela Lukin (2004). "Passed Away? The Fate of the Karuwali". In Moses, A. Dirk (ed.). Genocide and Settler Societies: Frontier Violence and Stolen Indigenous Children in Australian Society. Berghahn Books. pp. 174–193. doi:10.2307/j.ctt9qdg7m.12. ISBN 9781571814104. JSTOR j.ctt9qdg7m.12.
