= Alexander Salmon (disambiguation) =

Alexander Salmon may refer to:

- Alex Salmon (born 1994), English footballer
- Alexander Salmon (1820–1866), English-Tahitian merchant

== See also ==
- Alexander Salmond (disambiguation)
