= Mulka Station =

Pastoral lease in South Australia

Coordinates: 28.3524°S 138.65257°E

Location in South Australia

Mulka Station is a pastoral lease that operates as a cattle station in the far north of South Australia. The land occupying the extent of the Mulka Station pastoral lease was gazetted as a locality by the Government of South Australia on 26 April 2013 under the name "Mulka".

== Geography ==
It is situated approximately 154 kilometres (96 mi) north of Marree and 216 kilometres (134 mi) west of Innamincka. The main vehicular access to the property is via the unpaved Birdsville Track.

=== Climate ===
Having a hot arid climate (BWh), the property is found to the south of Clifton Hills Station and is the driest permanently occupied pastoral holding in the country with annual rainfall of about 10 centimetres (4 in).

Drought had gripped the area in early 1929 with George Aiston predicting that if it did not break by the end of 1929 then the area would be deserted by both Europeans and Indigenous Australians.

In 2005 drought conditions were so bad that the property was completely destocked. By 2010 the rains had arrived further north so that Cooper Creek was flowing again as far as Lake Eyre.

== History ==
The property was purchased in 1983 by Denis Overton and Gabrielle Overton and it occupies an area of 5,600 square kilometres (2,162 sq mi). Both Lake Hope and Red Lake are situated within the station boundaries.

Established prior to 1889 the property used to be stocked with sheep. In 1889 the owner was James White who sold Mulka along with Canatalkina Run which together occupied an area of 804 square miles (2,082 km^{2}) and was stocked with 6,000 sheep.

George "Poddy" Aiston acquired Mulka in about 1923, he had previously worked as a policeman at Mungerannie after returning from the Boer War in 1902. By 1925 he had built the Mulka Store near the Mulka Bore along the Birdsville Track. The store was the only one in an area of approximately 70,000 square miles (181,299 km^{2}) and carried the broadest range of stock imaginable. The Mulka Store Ruins are listed on the South Australian Heritage Register. From 1933 to 1934 the 475-square-mile (1,230 km^{2}) property was struck by drought again with Aiston being unsure if his 1,000 head of cattle were even alive. In late 1934 the property was struck by dust storms and then rain with the creeks flooding. George Aiston died in 1943 but his wife Mabel remained running the store until 1951.

Airmail delivery to remote properties in outback South Australia, New South Wales and Queensland commenced in 1949. Mulka along with other remote properties including Mungerannie, Clifton Hills, Glengyle, Davenport Downs, Morney Plains, Mount Leonard, Durrie, Cordillo Downs, Tanbar, Durham Downs, Nappa Merrie, Lake Pure and Naryilco were also on the route.

After Lake Hope was filled by three consecutive floods in 1989, 1990 and 1991 Mulka Station owners Denis Overton and his wife Gabrielle Overton were granted a Fishing Licence in 1991. In 2000 the Fisheries licence for Mulka Station was passed on from Denis Overton to his Brother Gary Overton.

Gary Overton got to use his fishing licence to start catching Lake Eyre golden perch in the waters of Lake Hope. The licence allows the removal of 350 tonnes (344 long tons; 386 short tons) of Lake Eyre golden perch, Welch's grunter and the Barcoo grunter but only once the lakes have disconnected from the Cooper Creek after a flood event.

In 2012 floodwaters returned allowing Overton to net up to 5 tonnes (5 long tons; 6 short tons) of fish per week which were trucked to Adelaide, with ice being brought back on the return leg. The station was also stocked with approximately 3,000 head of cattle.

== See also ==
- List of ranches and stations
- List of the largest stations in Australia
