= Burke and Wills Dig Tree =

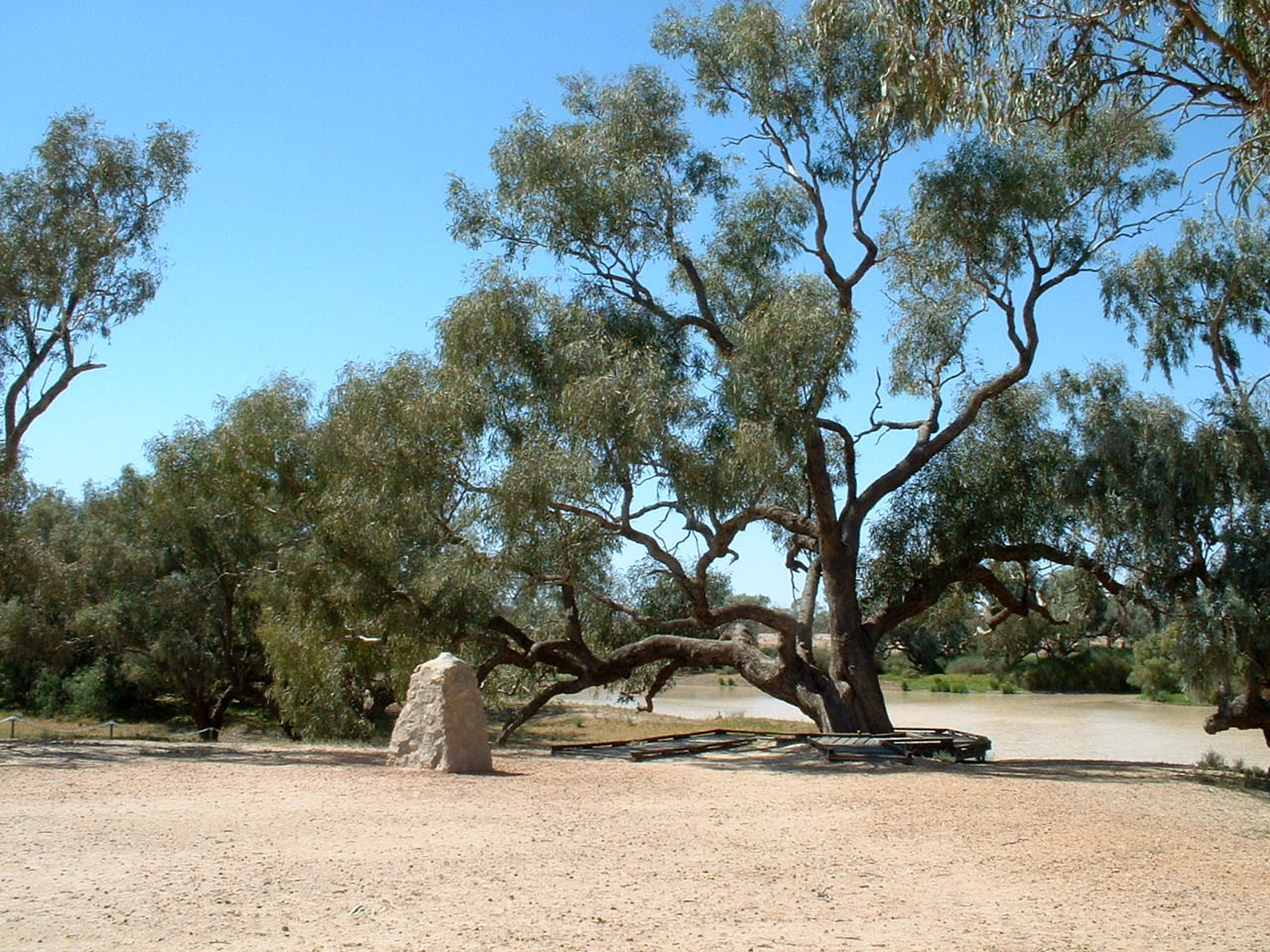
- Burke and Wills Dig Tree, 2008

- Location within Queensland
- 27.6237°S 141.0758°E
- Location: Nappa Merrie Station, Durham, Shire of Bulloo, Queensland, Australia

History
- Design period: 1840s–1860s (mid-19th century)
- Built: 1861 April 21 – 1861 April 21

Queensland Heritage Register
- Official name: Burke and Wills Dig Tree
- Type: state heritage (landscape)
- Designated: 28 February 2003
- Reference no.: 601073
- Significant period: 1861 (historical)
- Significant components: plaque, cairn, signage – interpretative

The Dig Tree is a heritage-listed blazed eucalyptus tree at Nappa Merrie Station, Durham, Shire of Bulloo, Queensland, Australia. It was blazed on 21 April 1861. It was added to the Queensland Heritage Register on 28 February 2003.

== History ==
The Burke and Wills Dig Tree on the banks of Cooper's Creek is associated with explorers Robert O'Hara Burke and William John Wills. The tree was one of two trees blazed on 21 April 1861 by William Brahe and party who had remained at Cooper's Creek while Burke, Wills, Charles Gray and John King forged ahead to the northern coast of Australia. Brahe's party was finally forced to abandon the depot and trek homewards, leaving a message pointing to a cache of buried stores.

=== The Victorian Exploring Expedition ===
The Victorian Exploring Expedition was organised by the Royal Society of Victoria and supported by the Victorian Government. The party – comprising fifteen men, twenty-six Indian camels with their drivers, packhorses, wagons, food and supplies – left Melbourne on 20 August 1860. In early October the party reached Menindee on the Darling River. Burke had already begun to shed baggage, determined to travel light and fast, leaving behind much of the equipment and some provisions at Balranald.

Burke left more provisions at Menindee. He also quarrelled with Landells, who subsequently resigned. Burke promoted Wills to second-in-charge and engaged local man William Wright as third officer. Despite having received clear instructions that he was to establish his main base camp at Cooper's Creek, Burke pressed on quickly with an advance party of eight, leaving the remainder of the men and stores under the unreliable charge of Wright. Wright lingered at Menindee for three months, contrary to Burke's orders to proceed to Coopers' Creek as soon as possible. Wright failed to arrive at Cooper's Creek with the all-too-important reserve provisions and transport before Burke returned from the Gulf of Carpentaria.

=== Coopers Creek Depot ===
On 6 December 1860 Burke and his seven men established Camp LXV (65) at Cooper's Creek, having halted at several other spots along the Creek during the preceding three and a half weeks while searching for the best location for a longer-term depot.

Here Burke split his party once again, and on 16 December pressed on to the Gulf accompanied only by Wills, King and Gray. Brahe, Thomas McDonough, William Patten and Dost Mahomet were instructed by Burke to wait for at least three months (the more cautious Wills preferred four months), before retracing their steps homewards via the Darling River. During their stay at Camp LXV, Brahe's party erected a timber stockade to protect themselves and their supplies from the unwanted interest of local Aborigines.

Four months later on the morning of 21 April 1861, William Brahe and his party of three others including the seriously injured Patten, left for Menindee. Before embarking on this four-hundred-mile return journey, Brahe carved three messages on two separate coolibah trees at Depot Camp LXV. One of the inscriptions contained the word 'DIG' and the location of the cache of buried stores. Two other blazes were carved on an adjacent tree; one displaying the letter 'B' for Burke and the camp number 'LXV', the other contained the dates of the arrival of the party (6 December 1860) and the date of Brahe's departure.

Brahe noted in his journal that the party left the depot at 10 o'clock a.m., leaving 50 pounds (23 kg) of flour, 50 pounds (23 kg) of oatmeal, 50 pounds (23 kg) of sugar, and 30 pounds (14 kg) of rice buried near the stockade, at the foot of a large tree, and marked the word "Dig" on the tree.

Brahe headed towards Menindee, taking all the camels, horses and clothes, and the bulk of the remaining food stores. He later testified that he did not leave the message and stores in any real expectation of Burke's return, given that he was already well overdue. "Rather, only for any party that should come up - that was most likely to come up from the Darling - to know what had become of us. I was very likely to miss any party coming up", he told the 1861–2 Royal Commission established to inquire into and report upon the deaths of Burke and Wills.

Burke's party, by now reduced to three with the death of Gray on 17 April 1861, reached Camp LXV on the evening of 21 April 1861. Only two exhausted camels survived and the men were perilously low on stores. They discovered that Brahe had departed that same day, leaving the messages carved into the Dig Tree pointing to the cache of supplies. Subsequent events would prove to be a litany of missed opportunities and failure to communicate.

A week after their departure from Camp LXV, Brahe met with Wright's party, heading north and finally en route to Cooper's Creek. Brahe and Wright then returned to the camp, but having noticed no evidence of Burke's return on 21 April, left no further messages or indications and retraced their steps southwards. Brahe arrived in Melbourne late in June 1861 to report on the missing men.

On April 23 Burke's trio began the 150-mile westward journey to Blanchewater Station, near Mount Hopeless in South Australia, preferring to take this direction over the longer, but known, journey to Menindee. Twice they were forced back to Cooper's Creek due to lack of water to the west. They then remained along the Creek throughout June. On 30 May 1861 Wills had returned to Camp LXV. He found no evidence of Brahe's return in early May, and placed his journals and a new note in the buried cache for fear of accidents, and returned to his companions waiting further along Cooper's Creek. After surviving on ground nardoo, which was slowly poisoning them due to their lack of expertise in its preparation in leaching out the toxins, Wills died alone on the banks of Cooper's Creek on 27 or 28 June. He had insisted that his companions head further up the creek to seek assistance from the Aborigines. A day or two later, Burke also succumbed, having sent King on to look for help. With the assistance of Aborigines, King survived along the watercourse until found on 15 September 1861 by Alfred William Howitt's search party.

=== Rescue attempts ===
When it became known that the Burke and Wills expedition had foundered, such was the prominence of the undertaking that a number of search parties were quickly organized. Howitt left from Melbourne, John McKinlay from Adelaide, Frederick Walker from Rockhampton, and William Landsborough from Brisbane.

Howitt's party, which included Brahe arrived at Camp LXV on 13 September 1861. The Royal Commission was told that they found the depot as Mr Brahe had left it, the plant untouched, and nothing removed of the useless things lying about, but a piece of leather. After reuniting with King the party located Wills' remains where his body had been covered by King, some miles downstream of Camp LXV. They buried Wills on 18 September 1861, and inscribed a tree. Field books, notebooks and various small articles were recovered.

Three days later and approximately seven miles away, Howitt found Burke's remains near Innamincka Waterhole (two miles north of Innamincka) in South Australia. Burke was buried wrapped in a Union Jack, under a box tree on the south-eastern bank of Cooper's Creek. Howitt blazed this tree at the head of Burke's grave.

The Royal Geographical Society of Australasia, organised to promote exploration, awarded Burke a posthumous RGS Founder's Medal in 1862. Wills was awarded nothing, as the Society's policy was to award only one medal to an exploration party. King received a gold watch, as did McKinlay, Landsborough and Walker for leading their various search parties.

These search parties helped open up vast areas of inland Australia for settlement, as a result of the increased knowledge of the country they brought back with them. McKinlay had travelled northwards across the Cooper, to Gray's grave, and on to the Gulf of Carpentaria. Landsborough came from the north, via the Barkly Tableland to the Cooper and then Menindee, and Walker arrived to find Burke's last camp, thence returning eastwards. By the time the public funeral for Burke and Wills was held in January 1863, pastoralists were driving their sheep and cattle up the Bulloo. Within a decade or so there were established homesteads on the banks of Cooper's Creek, including Nappa Merrie sheep station, taken up by John Conrick in 1873. Prospectors working their way north of Menindee found enormously rich deposits of silver, lead and zinc at Piesse's Knob, later better known as Broken Hill.

=== The Dig Tree ===
While working on the survey of the border between Queensland and South Australia, surveyor Alexander Salmond passed by Cooper's Creek and made a pencil sketch of the tree.

Called in 1911 by the Sydney Mail "William Brahe's Tree", an accompanying photograph showed a "DIG" inscription on the right-hand branching trunk partly overgrown with bark, obscuring the "D". Another blaze on the left-branching trunk showed some indecipherable letters and/or numerals. Surviving remnants of Brahe's stockade also are visible in the photograph. In 1928 the Royal Geographical Society of South Australia referred to the tree as better known as the "Depot Tree", alluding to its function of marking a major stopping and storage place for the expedition. Frank Clune's 1937 book Dig has been credited with changing the tree's popular, and still-current name, to the "Dig Tree".

This particular tree had initially received less attention because it was not immediately associated with the deaths of either man. But by the 1880s the various explorers' trees marked by members of the expedition and by the various search parties had become valued by Australians as relics worthy of protection. The Dig Tree eventually came to be regarded as central to the story of the expedition, partly as a result of John Longstaff's iconic 1907 painting exhibited in the National Gallery of Victoria, The Arrival of Burke, Wills and King at the deserted Camp at Coopers Creek.

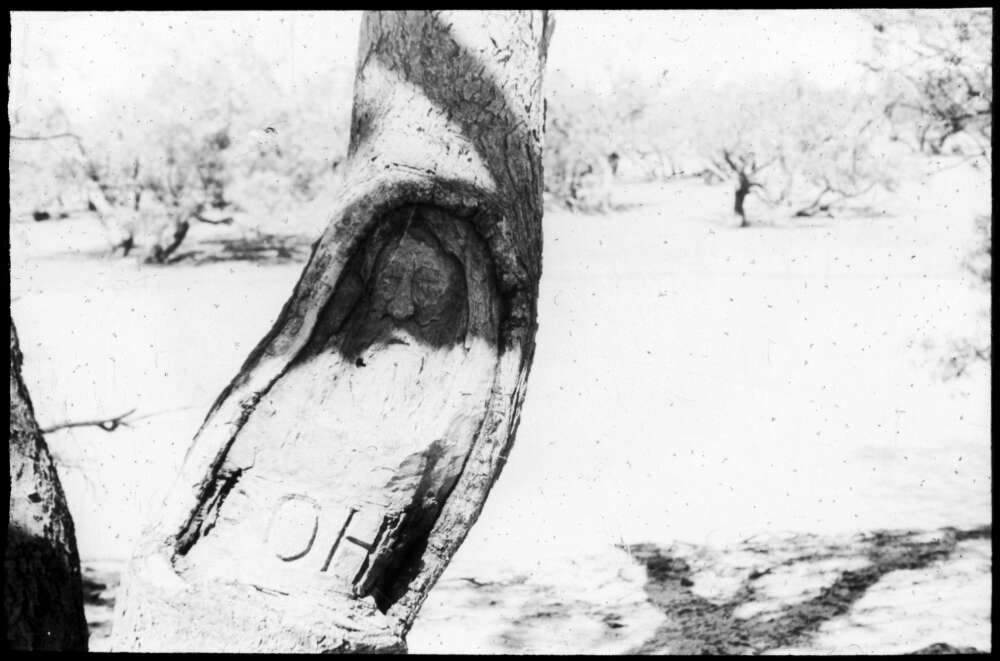
The "Face Tree" adjacent to the Dig tree into which John Dick in 1898 carved ROHB and a portrait of John Burke's face, 1935

The Dig Tree has been considered of historical significance to Queensland for much of the 20th century. In 1937 the Conrick Plaque, erected by members of the first Anglo-Australian family to occupy Yandruwandha/Yawarrawarrka and Wanggumara land, was placed on a cairn near the Dig Tree. On 2 July 1964 the Queensland Government declared an area of approximately one acre surrounding the Dig Tree a reserve for memorial purposes, the land placed under the trusteeship of the Royal Historical Society of Queensland. The Stanbroke Pastoral Company currently manages the site on behalf of the Society.

The Department of Environment & Heritage erected interpretative signage in 1993. In 1996–1997 further signage was prepared by the Department of Environment, in consultation with the Royal Historical Society of Queensland, Bulloo Shire Council, and the Stanbroke Pastoral Company. Funded by Dick Smith's Australian Geographic publication, these new interpretative panels were erected c. 1997. Subsequently, boardwalks were built to protect the Dig and Face Trees, and toilets were built in February 2001. The Face Tree is located on the same reserve as the Dig Tree. It portrays the face of Robert O'Hara Burke and the letters ROHB, thought to have been carved in 1898 by John Dick.

== Description ==
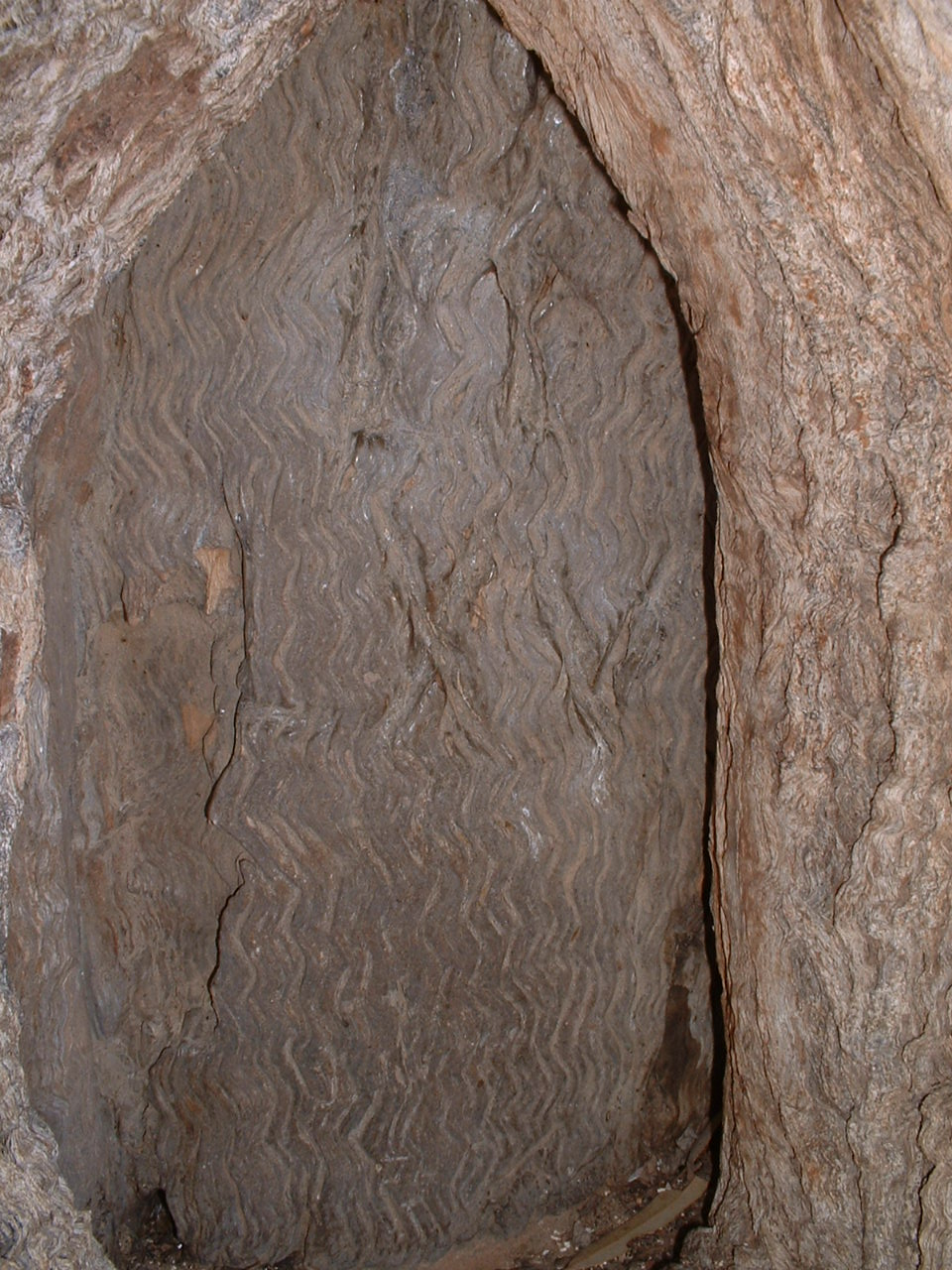
Close up of the carving on the Dig Tree, LXV for camp 65 is still visible, 2008

The Dig Tree is located approximately four to six kilometres southwest of Nappa Merrie homestead, on a Reserve for Memorial Purposes. The Reserve of 4,470 square metres (48,100 sq ft) is excised from Nappa Merrie cattle station, which comprises almost three-quarters of a million hectares of Channel Country. The homestead is close to the South Australian border, lying some 380 kilometres (240 mi) west of Thargomindah and forty-four kilometres east of Innamincka.

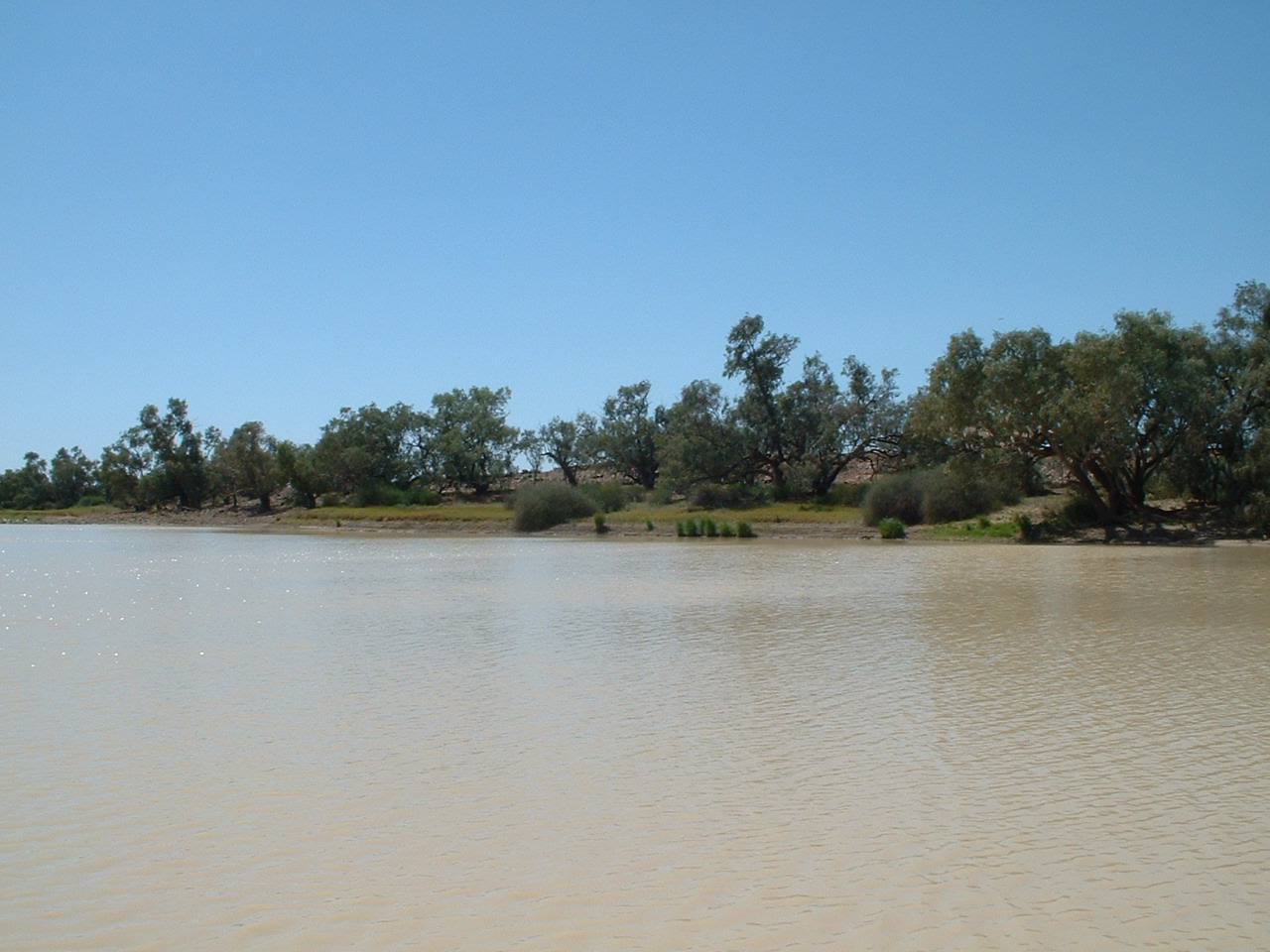
Waterhole beside the Dig Tree, 2008

The Dig Tree is a mature coolibah (Eucalyptus microtheca), believed to be 200 to 250 years old, common along this section of the Cooper and widespread in arid and semi-arid areas near watercourses and in seasonally-inundated areas. The tree stands high above the creek, on the southern bank of the Bulloo Bulloo waterhole.

Brahe cut two blazes into this tree in 1861. On the creek side of the trunk "B/LXV" denotes Brahe and Camp 65 in Roman numerals. On an upstream-side limb "DEC 6.60 APR 21.61" marks the date of establishment of the camp, and that of Brahe's departure. All of the lettering in the 'date blaze' is now obscured by overgrowing bark. On a nearby tree Brahe blazed the message "DIG THREE FT NW."

When Alfred Howitt returned to Cooper Creek one year later (1862) so that he could collect the bodies of Wills and Burke for burial in Melbourne, a member of his team, Alexander Aitken, rode to Depot LXV and blazed another "DIG" message on the other side of the same tree on which Brahe had earlier cut his "B/LXV." This new message read: "AH" (Howitt's initials) "DIG UNDER ----> TO DEPOT". This 'Dig' message referred to information (buried in a bottle) about Howitt's depot at Cullyamurra Waterhole, further south, where supplies were available for other travellers.

A boardwalk has been constructed around the tree to prevent the ground from being compacted by visitors footfalls. A stone cairn is located 40 feet (12 m) northwest of the Dig Tree. Further to the northwest is the Conrick Plaque, a metal sign attached to a large stone. Recent signage near the Dig Tree tells the story of Burke and Wills and their ill-fated expedition.

The Face Tree (Eucalyptus microtheca), stands on the banks of the waterhole downstream (southwest) of the Dig Tree. It portrays a rendition of the face of Robert O'Hara Burke and the letters ROHB.

== Heritage listing ==
Burke and Wills Dig Tree was listed on the Queensland Heritage Register on 28 February 2003 having satisfied the following criteria.

The place is important in demonstrating the evolution or pattern of Queensland's history.

The Dig Tree is important in demonstrating the evolution of Queensland history, because the Burke and Wills expedition contributed to establishing commercial pastoral exploitation of the Australian inland. During the 1860s settlers, including the Duracks and Costellos in 1865, had pushed into the Channel Country grazing their sheep and cattle along Coopers Creek and the myriad channels and streams. Only twelve years after the deaths of Burke and Wills, the land encompassing the Dig Tree and depot area had been taken up as Nappa Merrie station.

The place has a special association with the life or work of a particular person, group or organization of importance in Queensland's history.

- List of individual trees
