= Moomba Airport =

- IATA: MOO; ICAO: YOOM

Summary
- Airport type: Private
- Operator: Santos
- Location: Gidgealpa, South Australia
- Elevation AMSL: 143 ft (44 m)
- Coordinates: 28°06′00″S 140°11′48″E

Map
- Location in South Australia

Runways
Direction	Length		Surface
Direction	m	ft	Surface
12/30	1,718	5,636	Asphalt
- Sources: Australian AIP and aerodrome chart

Moomba Airport (IATA: MOO, ICAO: YOOM) is located in the gazetted locality of Gidgealpa, South Australia.

== Airlines and destinations ==
Airlines	Destinations
Alliance Airlines	Mining Charter: Adelaide, Ballera, Brisbane

== See also ==
- List of airports in South Australia
