= Eringa Station =

Pastoral lease in South Australia

Coordinates: 26.285°S 134.726°E

Location in South Australia

Eringa Station is a pastoral lease that operates as a cattle station in the outback of South Australia, once owned by Sir Sidney Kidman. Its land is gazetted as a locality called Eringa in 2013.

It is situated 79 kilometres (49 mi) south of Aputula and 151 kilometres (94 mi) east of Kulgera. The area is hilly and has a better average rainfall than much of the surrounding country. The rarely dry waterhole, the Eringa waterhole, was once situated within the boundaries of the station.

== History ==
Established at some time prior to 1879 it was owned by Arthur Treloar and J. J. Duncan, with Treloar managing the property. By 1886 Eringa was stocked with 4,000 head of cattle and 150 horses.

The 5,430-square-kilometre (2,096 sq mi) property was acquired in 1899 by Sidney Kidman, in the same year he also acquired Austral Downs and Carcoory Stations. Kidman named his home in Kapunda, which he acquired around 1900, after this property.

In 1908 the property occupied an area of 2,820 square kilometres (1,088 sq mi). The area had excellent rains in 1910 with over 100 millimetres (4 in) being recorded over a few days with creeks in the area all flooding. In 1955 the 9,100-square-kilometre (3,500 sq mi) station was being managed by Mr. W. L. Franklin and was running 5,000 head of cattle.

The station buildings are now derelict and the leasehold is part of the 7,700-square-kilometre (3,000 sq mi) Hamilton Station.

The land occupying the extent of the Eringa Station pastoral lease was gazetted as a locality in April 2013 under the name "Eringa".

== See also ==
- List of ranches and stations
