= Morney Plains Station =

Pastoral lease in Queensland

Coordinates: 25.54192°S 141.63295°E

Location in Queensland

Morney Plains Station, most commonly referred to as Morney Plains, is a pastoral lease that operates as a cattle station in south west Queensland.

It is situated about 104 kilometres (65 mi) west of Windorah and 232 kilometres (144 mi) east of Birdsville in the channel country close to the border with South Australia.

The property is currently owned by S. Kidman & Co. and occupies an area of 6,240 square kilometres (2,409 sq mi) with a carrying capacity of 14,000 head.

== History ==
The traditional owners of the area are the Karuwali, who have lived there for tens of thousands of years. Their huts were constructed by a framework of arched branches covered in grass, leaves and soil. Their diet included the wild rice which grew in the region and their graves were mounds over which large logs were placed. Part of their mourning rites included covering their bodies with white clay which they called copi.

Karuwali (also known as Garuwali, Dieri) is a language of far western Queensland. The Karuwali language region includes the landscape within the local government boundaries of the Diamantina Shire Council, including the localities of Betoota and Haddon Corner.

The lease was first taken up, on Karuwali tribal lands, by pioneer and pastoralist John Costello in the late 1860s or early 1870s. William Barker bought Morney Plains in 1876 along with the 1,000 head of cattle it was stocked with from the Collins brothers.

The property was owned by Weir and Scott in 1881 when it was visited by a journalist who described it as "splendid country with hardly any grass on it simply to want for sufficient rainfall". The writer had been riding in a southerly direction along the Diamantina River and had described the area near the station as being lightly timbered stony country with large areas of saltbush and cotton bush. In 1887 the homestead was washed away following exceptionally heavy rains in the area and the heaviest flooding known at the time.

In 1927 the property was acquired by Ernest Castine for £27,500. Castine bought the property at auction from Coles Brothers Limited following the death of Thomas Kidman. The property occupied an area of 908 square miles (2,352 km^{2}) and was stocked with 7,500 head of cattle and 200 horses, and well watered by over four artesian bores.

Airmail delivery to remote properties in outback South Australia, New South Wales and Queensland commenced in 1949. Morney Plains along with other remote properties including Mungerannie, Clifton Hills, Glengyle, Davenport Downs, Mulka, Mount Leonard, Durrie, Cordillo Downs, Tanbar Station, Durham Downs, Nappa Merrie, Lake Pure and Naryilco were also on the route.

Craig Lasker and Nikki Smith have managed the property since 2000 after short stints at Ruby Plains Station and then Mooraberree Station, an outstation at Morney Plains. Drought struck in 2001 and continued through 2002, with the herd being reduced from 13,000 to 3,000 head of cattle. In 2003 a heavy downpour caused more damage than relief and later the same year the homestead burnt down killing the couple's two children. Despite the tragedy the couple stayed at Morney Plains and were still managing it in 2012.

In 2013, the station was struck by drought again, requiring water to be piped from a bore to the homestead once the water in the dams had run dry.

== See also ==
- List of ranches and stations
- List of the largest stations in Australia
