= Davenport Downs Station =

Pastoral lease in Queensland

Coordinates: 24.15293°S 141.10344°E

Location in Queensland

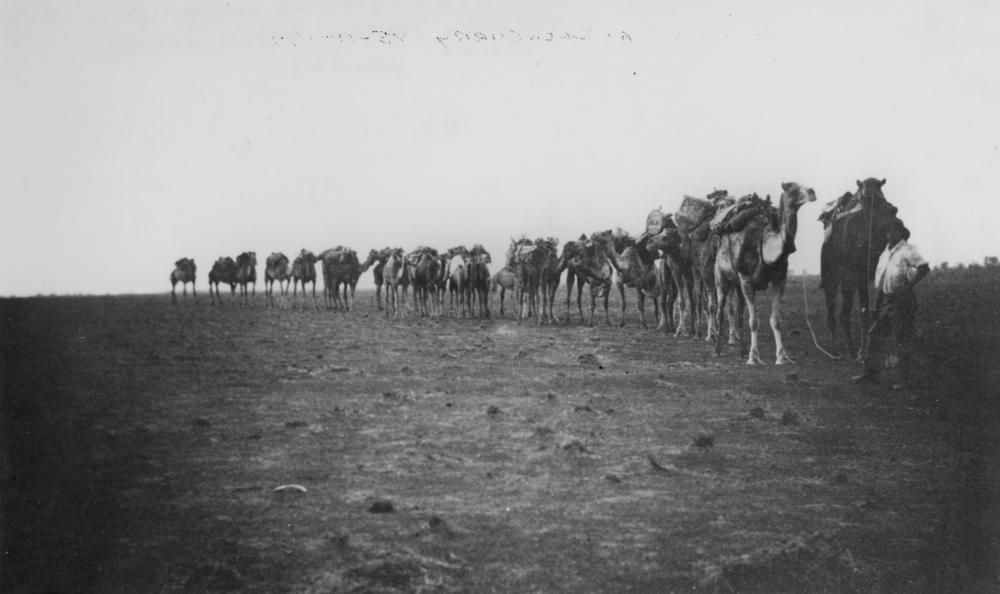
Camel train between Winton and Davenport Downs, 1911

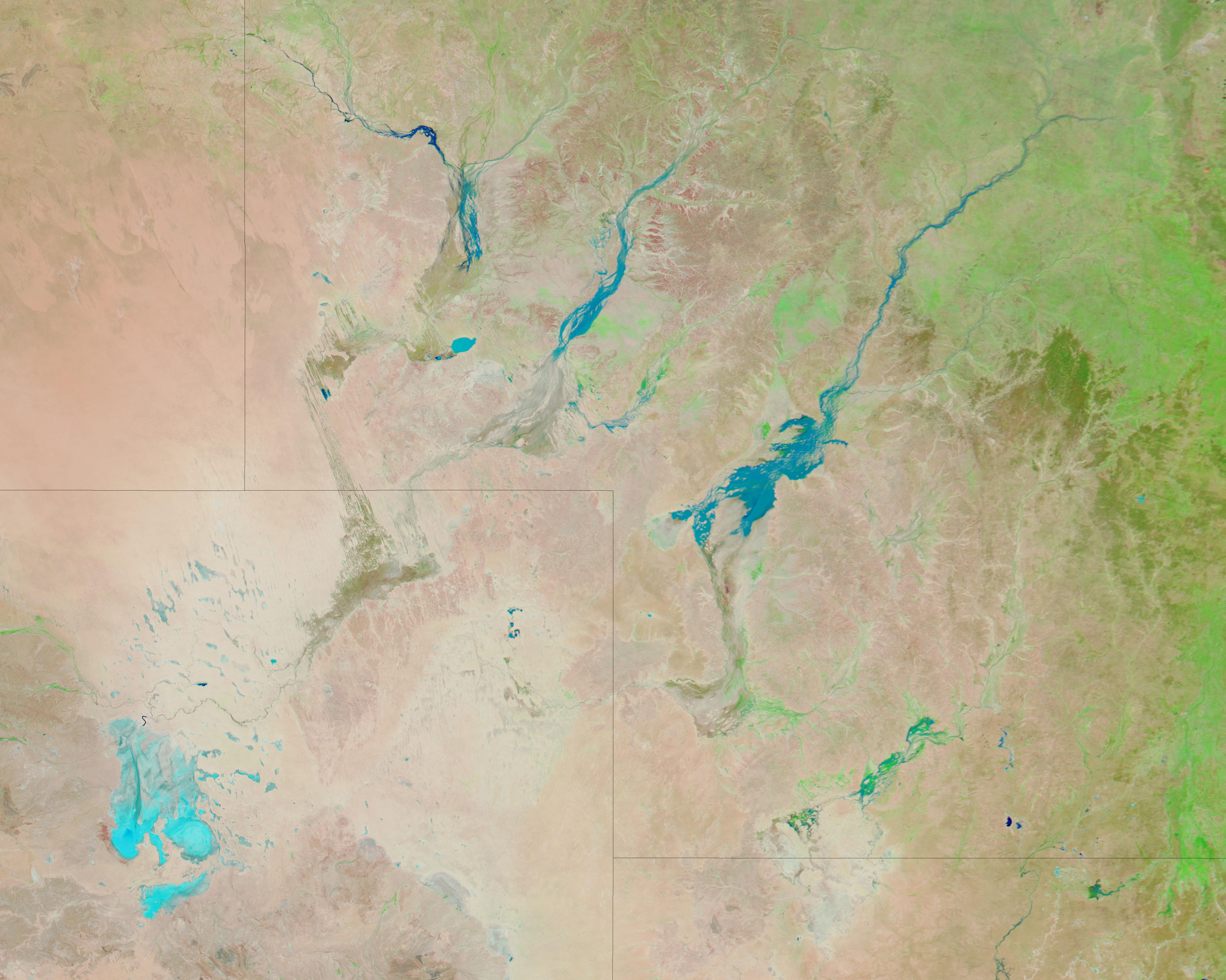
Channel Country Flooding with Davenport Downs surrounded by floodwaters 2010

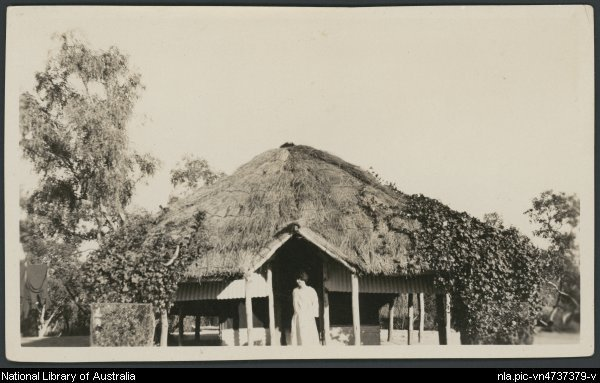
Meat House at Davenport Downs, 1925.

Davenport Downs Station is a pastoral lease that operates as a cattle station in Queensland, Australia.

== Description ==
It is situated in Diamantina Lakes about 184 kilometres (114 mi) south east of Boulia and 262 kilometres (163 mi) north east of Birdsville in the channel country of Queensland.

Davenport Downs is the largest cattle station in Queensland and the fourth largest station in Australia after Anna Creek station, Alexandria Station and Clifton Hills Station. Together with Springvale station which is run in aggregate with Davenport they occupy an area of 15,100 square kilometres (5,830 sq mi) and are currently owned by Paraway Pastoral Company.

Composed of mitchell grass downsland in the channel country, it has good access to water via many bores that tap into the Great Artesian Basin as well as the Diamantina River and Farrars Creek both of which cross the property. Both the waterways will often flood about one quarter of the property during the wet season providing abundant of feed.

== History ==
The lease was first taken up by pioneer and pastoralist John Costello in the late 1860s. The property was acquired by prominent pastoralist, James Rutherford in the late 1860s along with other runs in Queensland such as Ingledoon (which adjoins Davenport Downs), Ambathala near Charleville and Burrenbilla near Cunnamulla.

Following Rutherford's death the property was sold by the executors in 1913. The leasehold was advertised as having an area of 3,089 square miles (8,000 km^{2}) with the lease expiring in June 1946. It also had two artesian bores at this time and 20,200 cattle, 340 horses and 68 camels, all the stock were included with the property. It was acquired by Thomas Purcell who also owned Galway Downs, Manilla and Whitula stations for £67,000.

Purcell later sold the property in 1925 to the two lessees of a neighbouring property named Cooper and Trenerry. The station was running 17,000 cattle at the time and had an area of 2,214 square miles (5,734 km^{2}).

The rivers and creeks were all running in 1928 cutting roads into the station for a few days.

The body of an unfortunate German named J. Lelanes was found at a wayside camp on Davenport in 1930. He was thought to have died of dehydration between Windorah and Springvale then his body was later washed down by floodwaters.

The station was gripped by drought in 1932.

Airmail delivery to remote properties in outback South Australia, New South Wales and Queensland commenced in 1949. Davenport Downs along with other remote properties including Mungerannie, Clifton Hills, Glengyle, Mulka, Morney Plains, Mount Leonard, Durrie, Cordillo Downs, Tanbar Station, Durham Downs, Nappa Merrie, Lake Pure and Naryilco were also on the route.

The station was infested with feral cats in 1992, prompting the then environment minister Pat Comben to send in army sharpshooters to reduce the population. This was mostly done to protect the wild bilby colonies in the area. The sharpshooters culled about 500 cats over three days, one of which weighed in at 8.2 kilograms (18 lb).

Part of Astrebla Downs National Park was resumed by the state government in 1995 from the then owner, AMP, in exchange for another holding. Astrebla was then known as the store paddock and had a population of approximately 350 bilbies which was about one third of the surviving population in Queensland.

Paraway purchased Davenport in 2009 and neighbouring Springvale in 2011.

== See also ==
- List of ranches and stations
- List of the largest stations in Australia
