= Driza-Bone =

Australian clothing company

- Industry: Footwear, clothing
- Founded: 1932
- Founder: Edward Le Roy
- Headquarters: Eagleby, Queensland, Australia
- Parent: S. Kidman & Co
- Website: www.drizabone.com.au

Driza-Bone, originating from the phrase "dry as a bone", is a trade name for the company making full-length waterproof riding coats and apparel. The company was established in 1898 and is currently Australian owned and manufactures its products in Australia. The trademark of Driza-Bone was first registered in 1933.

This style of coat originated in Australia workwear for stockmen. Not traditionally considered desk-wear, the coats were developed to protect horse riders from the rain and feature straps that hold the coat to the rider's leg.

== History ==
In the late 1800s, a Scot named Edward Le Roy emigrated to New Zealand. He was able to manufacture oilskin rainwear for use by sailors on sailing ships in the local waters at the time. The garments were originally constructed from the lightweight sails of the sailing ships. The waterproofing of the clothing was by application of linseed oil to the cotton. T. E. Pearson, the son of E. J. Pearson who started Pearson Soap in Hamilton, New Zealand, took a consignment of Leroy Coats to Australia. Stockmen at the time had gathered news of this garment from sailors who had subsequently left sailing to work on the land. Because the garments were flammable around campfires, T. E. Pearson worked on developing a new formula for sealing the coats. He did this in the backyard shed of his home in Kangaroo Street, Manly. Pearson subsequently, in partnership with Leroy, registered the trademark. T.E. died in 1962 and is buried in Frenchs Forest, New South Wales.

Over time, changes were made to the original design in the order of:

1. longer coat for horse riding
2. fantail in the back of the coat to cover the saddle
3. wrist straps to secure the sleeves and stop the arms from getting cold
4. leg straps to stop the coat from flapping around

As time went by, the linseed oil (while proving satisfactory for waterproofing) went hard and cracked in the hot summers. Le Roy and T.E. Pearson (of Pearson's Sandsoap fame) came up with a new proofing technique. This new proofing technique has remained unchanged to the present day.

In late 2008, the brand was brought back into Australian ownership for the first time in many decades. The acquisition brought with it several influential industry figures, including Steve Bennett (founder of Country Road). This resulted in the immediate relocation of both the Eagleby, Queensland, head office and primary warehousing facilities to Melbourne, Victoria.

In December 2023, Driza-Bone was purchased by S. Kidman & Co.

== Major appearances ==
=== 2000 Olympic Games ===
Driza-Bone riding coats were worn by the stockmen and stockwomen at the Opening Ceremony of the 2000 Summer Olympics in Sydney. Also, the 2000 Olympic Band members wore Driza-Bone coats specially made for them as band musicians, in which the sleeves were made completely differently from the sleeves of the traditional Driza-Bone riding coats worn by the riders. The red, white and blue colours of the Driza-Bone coats for the band members were also different from the usual colour of the Driza-Bone coats. Also, all the medal presenters during the 2000 Summer Olympic Games wore Driza-Bone coats.

=== Stage musical ===
Driza-Bone coats designed by the bush/rural clothing enthusiast and designer Robert Peron were worn by the cast members of the 2002 theatre musical "The Man from Snowy River: Arena Spectacular".

=== APEC Australia 2007 ===
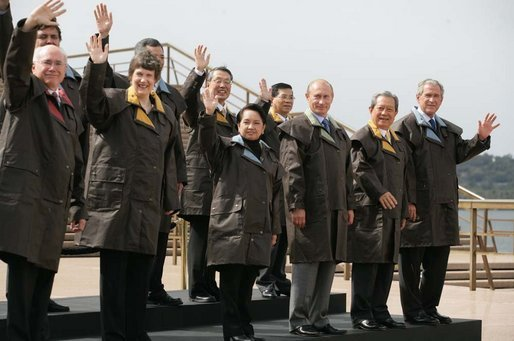
The APEC leaders pose for the official portrait in front of the Sydney Opera House

Driza-Bone coats made an appearance at the 2007 APEC Summit in Sydney. The 21 leaders at the Asia-Pacific Economic Cooperation conference posed in a group photo wearing Driza-Bone attire. According to an official statement, Australian Prime Minister John Howard selected Driza-Bone as the national outfit "with counsel and good advice" from his wife, Janette, and the APEC taskforce.

=== Tales from Margaritaville ===
The Driza-bone duster, or stockman's coat is mentioned by name by the Tully Mars, the hero of the short story Take Another Road from the short story collection Tales from Margaritaville, by Jimmy Buffett.
