= Mount Margaret Station =

Pastoral lease in Queensland, Australia

Coordinates: 26°54′02″S 143°20′24″E

Location in Queensland

Mount Margaret Station is a pastoral lease that operates as a sheep station and more recently as a cattle station. It is located about 98 kilometres (61 mi) west of Quilpie and 177 kilometres (110 mi) south of Windorah in Queensland. The property has extensive and reliable water supply with 80 kilometres (50 mi) of double frontage on the Wilson River and associated creeks.

Mount Margaret was once Queenslands and Australias largest sheep station, occupying an area of 599,000 hectares (1,480,161 acres) which makes it larger than the nation of Brunei. The station was sold in 2010 for $12 million, it was free of stock at the time but included all plant and equipment and was sold to New South Wales cattle producer Kilburnie Pastoral Co.

In 1937 the Peel River Pastoral Company who had acquired the station in 1925 sold the property for £50,000 to the Killeen Brothers, at this point the station was stocked with 10,000 head of cattle and 250 horses, but it was believed that the Killeens would make the change to sheep.

Owned in 1956 by the Killen family's Pastoral Development Holdings (formerly Elsinora), the property ran a flock of 76,000 sheep and 5,000 cattle. The adjoining properties include Malagarga and Kihee stations, both of which, at different time, have been owned along with Mount Margaret. The property was then purchased by Mr T. M. Gadsby in 1969 and was owned and managed by the Gadsby family until late 1979.

The station was acquired in 2004 by Mike Gordon's, the Bydand Pastoral Company, from the Yass based Reid family.

Bydand put the property on the market in 2009 and sold in 2010 to Kilburnie Pastoral Co. which still owned the property in 2012. The station has been breeding and selling Angus cattle. The price tag, with no stock, was approximately A$12.5 million.

== See also ==
- List of ranches and stations
- List of the largest stations in Australia
