= Alexander Hutchinson Salmond =

Australia surveyor

- Born: 1850; Scotland
- Died: March 1924 (aged 73–74)
- Occupation: Surveyor
- Spouse: Annie Skinner (m. 1886)

Alexander Hutchinson "Alec" Salmond (1850 – March 1924) was a Scottish surveyor who was involved in surveying the borders between Queensland and South Australia.

== Early life ==
Alexander Hutchinson Salmond was born in Scotland in 1850. His father was Dr David Salmond. Alexander acquired navigational skills as a cadet in the British merchant navy. Dr David Salmond and his four sons (including Alexander) immigrated to Rockhampton, Queensland, on the ship Fiery Star, arriving 5 November 1864; Dr Salmond was the ship's Surgeon-Superintendent.

Salmond married Annie M. Skinner on 23 December 1886 in St Philip's Church in Sydney.

== Surveying career ==
His career was spent working in the remote Australian outback. Salmond became a licensed surveyor in 1878 and was based in Cunnamulla, Queensland.

He was involved in the border surveys between Queensland and South Australia, including identifying Haddon Corner. As part of those expeditions, he visited Cooper Creek where he sketched the Burke and Wills Dig Tree under which Robert O'Hara Burke died in 1861.

In 1881, he was involved in surveying around Cunnamulla for the Trans-Continental railway, which was never constructed. The Trans-Australian Railway was built in 1917, but did not pass through Queensland.

Salmond was lured to the Western Australian goldfields in the early 1890s. Thereafter he worked in Kalgoorlie and in Carnarvon in the northwest. In 1903 he led a private expedition into the Kimberley region. Setting out from Wyndham he explored most of the rich area lying north of the Wunaamin Miliwundi Ranges to the westward of Cambridge Gulf.

== Later life ==
Salmond died in March 1924 in Fremantle, Western Australia. He was about seventy four years of age at the time of his death.

== Legacy ==
The Salmond River (near Wyndham) is named after him.
