= S. Kidman & Co =

Australian beef producing company

- Industry: Agriculture
- Founded: 1899
- Founder: Sidney Kidman
- Headquarters: Brisbane, Australia
- Number of locations: 4 pastoral leases
- Area served: Northern Territory; Queensland
- Products: Beef
- Owner: Hancock Prospecting (67%); Shanghai CRED (33%)
- Website: www.skidmanco.com.au

S. Kidman & Co is an Australian producer of beef. While it used to be one of the largest producers, since being owned by Gina Rinehart's Hancock Prospecting since December 2016, it has been selling off its properties. As of 10 April 2023 it has four pastoral leases, one in the Northern Territory and three in Queensland.

== History ==
S. Kidman & Co was founded in 1899 by Sidney Kidman. He was one of the greatest pastoral landholders in Australian history and became known by the nickname of "The Cattle King".

The entire landholding was placed up for sale in April 2015, comprising 11 cattle stations with a total area of over 100,000 square kilometres (38,610 sq mi) with a herd of 155,000 cattle. The total value of the company was estimated at A$360.5 million, and cattle stations in Western Australia, South Australia, Queensland, and the Northern Territory. In the year ending June 2015, Kidman recorded A$62 million in livestock sales, reflecting an increase of 10.71% on the previous year.

When two Chinese companies, Genius Link Asset Management and Shanghai Pengxin, were interested in acquiring the company in November 2015, the sale was blocked by the Treasurer of Australia, Scott Morrison, who cited the national interest clause in the Foreign Investment Act.

In December 2016, a Hancock Prospecting (67%) / Shanghai CRED (33%) joint venture purchased the company.

In April 2023, S. Kidman & Co sold four of its cattle stations, which cover 2,400,000 ha (5,900,000 acres). Durrie, Naryilco, and Glengyle stations, located in the Channel Country of Queensland, were bought by the Appleton Cattle Company, a family-owned beef cattle enterprise which has organic certification. The Harris family, who owns the adjacent Rockhampton Downs Station, purchased Brunchilly in the Northern Territory (including the Banka Banka East pastoral lease). The company did not disclose the purchase price, but a spokesperson said "The sale of these properties is consistent with S. Kidman and Co's strategy of divesting properties where significant investment has improved them". Only four stations were left in the company's hands after the sale.

S. Kidman and Co said "it remained committed to preserving the Kidman legacy and history", and was going to focus on expanding its grain-fed Santa Gertrudis and Kidman Premium beef brands, with the sale helping to provide capital to buy and improve other agricultural properties.

In December 2023, clothing manufacturers Driza-Bone and Rossi Boots were purchased.

== Locations ==
As of 11 April 2023, the company held four pastoral leases: Helen Springs in the Northern Territory, and Morney Plains, Rockybank, and Durham Downs in Queensland.

Pastoral leases the company previously held include:

- Brunchilly, NT
- Durrie, NSW
- Glengyle, QLD
- Innamincka, SA
- Macumba, SA
- Naryilco, NSW
- Ruby Plains, WA

== See also ==
- List of oldest companies in Australia
