= Cordillo Downs =

Pastoral lease and locality in South Australia

Coordinates: 26.70856°S 140.6201°E

Location in South Australia

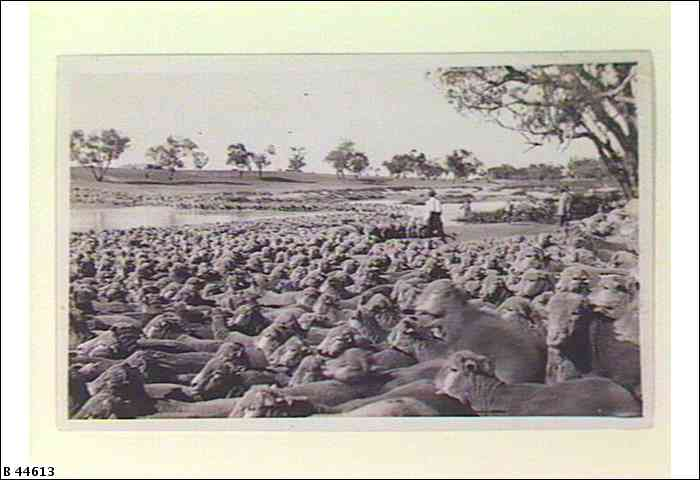
Droving sheep to Innamincka Station from Cordillo Downs c. 1915

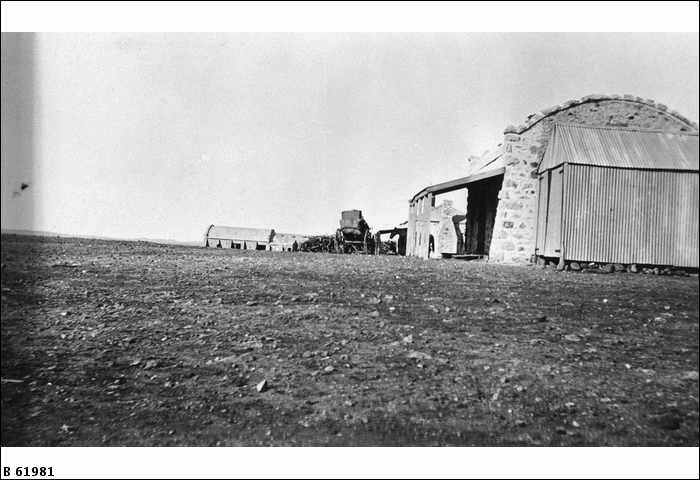
The woolshed and store at Cordillo Downs c. 1926

Cordillo Downs or Cordillo Downs Station is both a pastoral lease currently operating as a cattle station and a formal bounded locality in South Australia. It is located about 116 kilometres (72 mi) north of Innamincka and 155 kilometres (96 mi) south east of Birdsville. The name and boundaries of the locality were created on 26 April 2013 for the long established local name.

The station once occupied an area of 7,800 square kilometres (3,012 sq mi) and was regarded as Australia's largest sheep station (in the 1880s, Cordillo set a record of shearing over 85,000 sheep in a season).

One of the best known features of the station is the heritage-listed woolshed that is constructed of stone with a curved tin roof, built this way due to a lack of timber in the area. Cordillo gets around 167.3mm of rain annually.

== History ==
First taken up by John Frazer from Victoria in 1875 the station was initially known as Cardilla. Frazer let the property go in 1878 and a ballot was held, the lease going to Edgar Chapman, who sold off in 1883 to Peter Waite of the Beltana Pastoral Company. The property was stocked with just over 10,000 sheep, nearly 600 cattle and about 30 horses. In 1903 the property was amalgamated with two other stations, Cadelga and Haddon Downs, and had a flock of around 85,000 by 1905. The homestead was abandoned for a few years during the 1930s.

A plague of rats swept across the property from further north in Queensland in 1940, they were prevented from making it further south by the flooded Cooper Creek.

Cattle replaced sheep on the station in 1942 when the manager, Mr Napier, decided that the wild dogs that were prevalent in the area and were inside the boundary fence at the time would cause less damage.

The entire area was struck by drought in 1946 with many cattle dying and properties destocking.

Airmail delivery to remote properties in outback South Australia, New South Wales and Queensland commenced in 1949. Cordillo Downs along with other remote properties including Mungerannie, Clifton Hills, Glengyle, Davenport Downs, Morney Plains, Mount Leonard, Durrie, Mulka, Tanbar, Durham Downs, Nappa Merrie, Lake Pure and Naryilco were also on the route. The Cooper Creek broke its banks in 1950 resulting in widespread flooding through the area.

A meteor was thought to have landed somewhere at Cordillo in 1954. The bright flash and ball of fire that lasted for several minutes was spotted from many properties including Innamincka, Muloorina and Narilya, all of whom reported the phenomena to the Royal Flying Doctor Service.

Beltana owned the property until 1981 when they sold it to Brookman Holdings for $1.2 million. Brookman holdings is owned by the Brook family, Bill Brook was 81 years old when he bought Cordillo, where he was employed in 1918 as a ringer for 30 shillings per week. The property was owned by Anthony and Janet Brook in 2012, both of whom met Prince Charles and Camilla in Longreach during their 2012 tour of the outback. The Brooks run a herd of approximately 40,000 Hereford cattle and are certified organic producers of beef using the OBE Beef label.

Both the historic main Cordillo Downs Homestead and Woolshed and the Cadelga Homestead Ruins are listed on the South Australian Heritage Register. The woolshed was damaged by a storm in 2017, and restored with the help of Scottish stonemasons, with the work completed in July 2019. The stonework was restored using the traditional techniques, and the roof that had been blown off was replaced.

== Geography, vegetation and geology ==
The terrain of the country is flat with undulating gibber plains with sandhills and claypans. The land is prone to drought but otherwise has a light grass covering. Native vegetation found in the area include Mitchell grass, katoora, spinifex, cane grass, sandhill wattle and Bladder saltbush. Cordillo Downs is situated in the channel country and is periodically inundated with water from heavy rains further north, resulting in lush vegetation growth immediately afterwards. Some pasture species that appear when the water recede are Nardoo, Cooper Clover, Verbine, Lignum as well as many grasses. The Cordillo Downs road links the station with Innamincka and the Birdsville Developmental Road.

== See also ==
- List of ranches and stations § Australia
- List of the largest stations in Australia
