= Innamincka, South Australia =

Innamincka
- Town
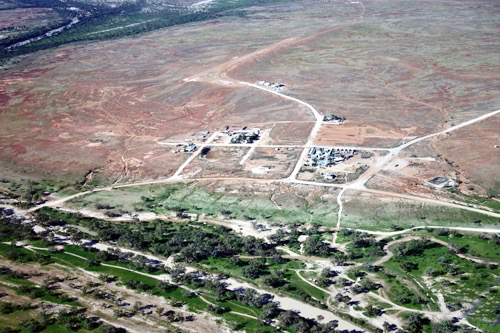
- Innamincka township from the north-east; Cooper Creek is in the foreground and left distance

- Coordinates: 27°44′48″S 140°44′17″E
- Country: Australia
- State: South Australia
- Region: Far North
- LGA: Pastoral Unincorporated Area
- Location: 821 km (510 mi) NE of Adelaide
- Established: 17 April 1890 (town); 23 October 2003 (locality)

Government
  - State electorate: Stuart
  - Federal division: Grey
- Elevation: 57 m (187 ft)

Population
  - Total: 21 (SAL 2021)
- Time zone: UTC+9:30 (ACST)
  - Summer (DST): UTC+10:30 (ACDT)
- Postcode: 5731
- Mean max temp: 29.6 °C (85.3 °F)
- Mean min temp: 15.6 °C (60.1 °F)
- Annual rainfall: 170.1 mm (6.70 in)
Localities around Innamincka
Pandie Pandie	Pandie Pandie; Cordillo Downs	Queensland
Clifton Hill Station	Innamincka	Queensland
Clifton Hill Station	Gidgealpa; Merty Merty; Bollards Lagoon	Queensland

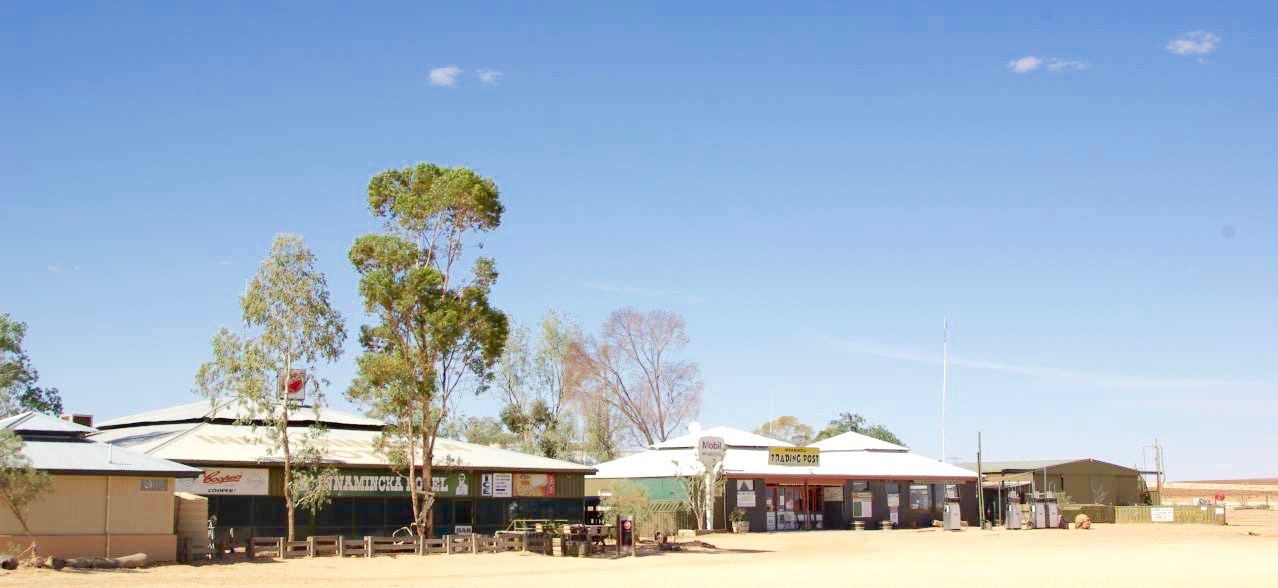
Pub, petrol station and general store at Innamincka township in 2007

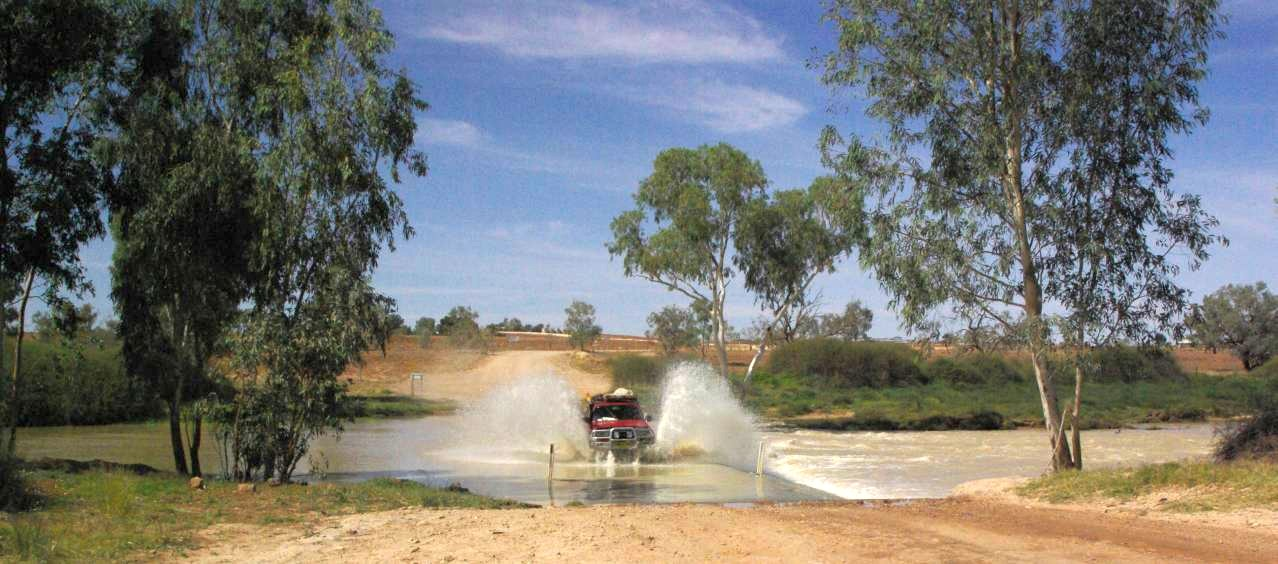
Cooper Creek crossing at Innamincka

Innamincka, formerly Hopetoun, is a township and locality in north-east South Australia. By air it is 820 kilometres (510 miles) north-east of the state capital, Adelaide, and 365 kilometres (227 miles) north-east of the closest town, Lyndhurst. It is 66 kilometres (41 miles) north-east of the Moomba Gas Refinery. The town lies within the Innamincka Regional Reserve and is surrounded by the Strzelecki Desert to the south and the Sturt Stony Desert to the north. It is linked by road to Lyndhurst via the Strzelecki Track, to the Birdsville Developmental Road via Cordillo Downs Road and Arrabury Road (via Haddon Corner), and the Walkers Crossing Track to the Birdsville Track. The Walkers Crossing Track is closed in summer and only traversable in dry weather. The township is situated along the Cooper Creek, a part of the Lake Eyre basin.

== History ==
Aboriginal Australians have lived in the lands around Innamincka for millennia, in what they call Wangkangurru country, the traditional home of the Yawarrawarrka and Yandruwandha people. The Yawarrawarrka language (also known as Yawarawarka, Yawarawarga, Yawarawarka, Jauraworka and Jawarawarka) is also spoken in the region. The traditional language region includes the local government area of the Shire of Diamantina in Far Western Queensland, extending into the Outback Communities Authority of South Australia towards Innamincka. The Wangkangurru (also known as Arabana/Wangkangurru, Wangganguru, Wanggangurru and Wongkangurru) language – closely related to the Arabana language of South Australia – is also spoken on Wangkangurru country. It has been traditionally spoken in the South Australian-Queensland border region taking in Birdsville and extending south towards Innamincka and Lake Eyre, including the local government areas of the Shire of Diamantina and the Outback Communities Authority of South Australia.

The first European to visit the area was Charles Sturt in 1845. He was followed by A C Gregory in 1858 and then Burke and Wills. A monument to Sturt and Burke and Wills was erected in Innamincka in 1944.

In 1882 a police camp was set up, paving the way for a small settlement. In 1889, a Royal Mail coach ran fortnightly from Farina, operated by merchants Davey and Pilkington. Originally named Hopetoun, Innamincka was proclaimed as a town on 17 April 1890. Hopetoun was named after the Governor of Victoria, the Earl of Hopetoun. However, it was never popular with local people and was re-proclaimed as the Town of Innamincka on 28 January 1892.

The town was never very large, but had a hotel, a store and a police station which, until Federation in 1901, acted as the customs post for collecting inter-colonial duties on cattle brought overland from Queensland into South Australia. In 1928 the Australian Inland Mission (a part of the Royal Flying Doctor Service) built a hospital, the Elizabeth Symon Nursing Home. Severe drought and poor access to the settlement then resulted in the closure of the hotel and the hospital. In 1951 the police post closed and the town was abandoned.

Increased tourism and the discovery of gas and oil reserves in the late 1960s led to a company opening a hotel, a store and accommodation in the abandoned town. In 1994, the Elizabeth Symon Nursing Home was restored by entrepreneur Dick Smith and the Australian Geographic magazine to be used as an interpretive centre for the National Parks and Wildlife Service South Australia. The nursing home had been listed on the South Australian Heritage Register in 1985.

In 2003, boundaries were created for the locality of Innamincka, including the government town. In 2013, the locality's boundaries were altered to include all of the Innamincka Regional Reserve and the Coongie Lakes National Park.

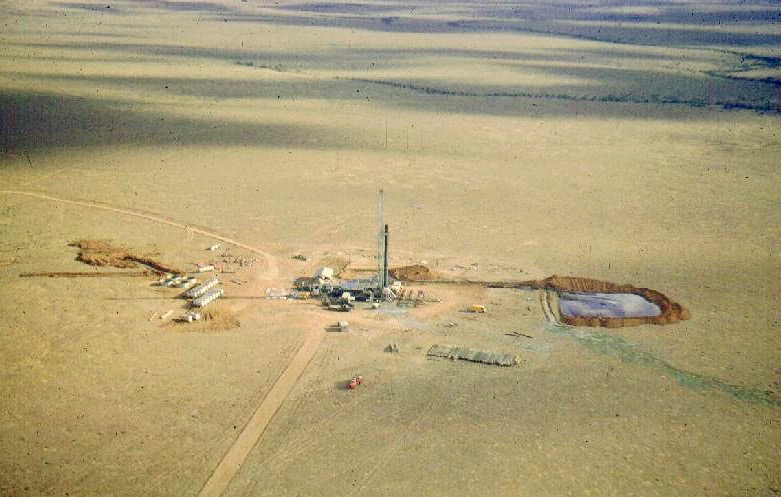
Santos drill rig near Innamincka in the Cooper Basin in 1959

The town common, on the banks of the Cooper, is popular with campers, as is the town's public coin-in-slot toilet and shower facility.

Gray's Tree, believed to be the burial place of a member of the Burke and Wills expedition, is listed on the South Australian Heritage Register and located in the north-western rural area of the Innamincka locality.

=== Burke and Wills ===
The Burke and Wills expedition passed through this area on their journey across Australia from Melbourne to the Gulf of Carpentaria. They established a Depot Camp on Cooper Creek at Camp LXV, their sixty-fifth camp since leaving Melbourne, at a place now called The Dig Tree. There was a depot at the Dig Tree from 6 December 1860 to 21 April 1861.

The Victorian Contingent Party under Alfred Howitt was sent by the Victorian government to establish the fate of the expedition. Howitt found the remains of both leaders, Robert O'Hara Burke and William John Wills, and buried them close to where the town is located today. He also found the sole survivor, John King living amongst, and cared for by, the Yawarrawarrka/Yandruwandha people, and returned him to Melbourne.

Howitt returned to the area in 1862 as leader of the Victorian Exploring Party. He established a depot camp at Cullyamurra Waterhole before exhuming the bodies of Burke and Wills and transporting them to Melbourne for a state funeral.

Today it is possible to visit the locations of Wills's grave and King's site on Cooper Creek downstream of Innamincka, and Burke's grave, Howitt's camp and the Dig Tree on Cooper Creek upstream of Innamincka.
