= Sidney Kidman =

Australian pastoralist and entrepreneur

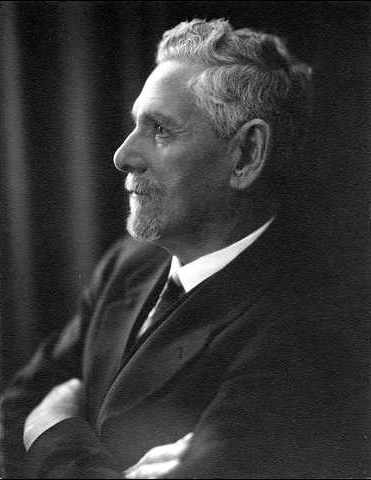
- Portrait of Sir Sidney Kidman in 1927
- Born: Sidney Herbert Kidman; 9 May 1857 'Glen Stuart', Fifth Creek near Adelaide, South Australia
- Died: 2 September 1935 (aged 78); Millswood, South Australia
- Resting place: Mitcham Cemetery, Adelaide, South Australia
- Occupation: Landowner
- Spouse: Isabel Brown Wright (1862–1948)
- Children: Annie Gertrude Kidman (1886–1973); Elma Thomson Kidman (1887–1970); Edna Gwendoline Kidman (1890–1975); Edith Kidman (1893–1895); Norman Sidney Palethorpe Kidman (1897–1898); Walter Sidney Palethorpe Kidman (1900–1970)
- Parent(s): George Kidman; Elizabeth Mary (Nunn) Kidman

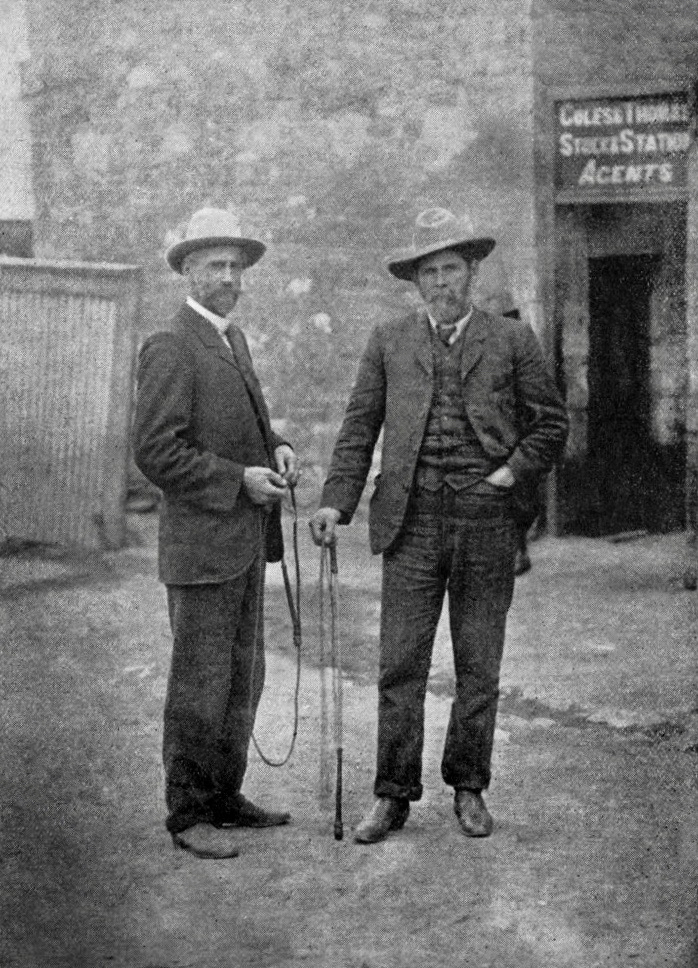
Sidney Kidman (right) and J. R. Chisholm in 1905

Sir Sidney Kidman (9 May 1857 – 2 September 1935), known as Sid Kidman and popularly named "the Cattle King", was an Australian pastoralist and entrepreneur who owned or co-owned large areas of land in Australia.

== Early life ==
Sidney Kidman was born on 9 May 1857 in Adelaide, in the colony of South Australia, the third son of George Kidman (died December 1857), farmer, and his wife Elizabeth Mary, née Nunn. Kidman’s childhood home was located on Maryvale Road in Athelstone, Adelaide. Kidman was educated at private schools in Norwood and left his home near Adelaide at age 13 with only five shillings and a one-eyed horse named Cyclops that he had bought with his savings. He joined a drover and learned quickly. He then worked as a roustabout and bullock-driver at Poolamacca cattle station, and Mount Gipps Station. and later as a drover, stockman and livestock trader. He made money trading whatever was needed, and supplying services (transport, goods, a butcher shop) to new mining towns springing up in outback New South Wales and South Australia, (including Cobar, Kapunda, Burra and eventually Broken Hill). After he and his brothers worked on the same station, they bought their own.

On 30 June 1885, Kidman married Isabel Brown Wright. They had four children.

== Enterprise ==
In 1895 Kidman, in partnership with his brother Sackville, acquired Cowarie Station.

In 1896, Kidman bought his first property in Queensland, Annandale Station, situated in the Channel Country and described as ideal fattening country for cattle.

In 1899 he acquired Eringa Station in South Australia, Austral Downs (NT), and Carcoory Station.

By 1903, Kidman owned or was a part owner of some 38,000 square miles (98,420 km^{2}) of country ranging from the Carlton Hill Station in Western Australia to Victoria River Downs Station in the Northern Territory and Macumba Station in South Australia, and properties in the channel county of Queensland, including Annandale and Bulloo Downs.

Kidman acquired Diamantina Lakes Station in 1908, paying A£25,000 for the station and all its stock. Later in 1908, he bought the 700 square kilometres (270 sq mi) Mount Poole Station in outback New South Wales. The estimated size of Kidman's holdings in 1908 was 50,000 square miles (129,499 km^{2}).

Another large Channel Country property, Durham Downs Station, was bought in 1909. Kidman bought the property along with Tilbaroo, Morney Plains and Durrie Stations in Queensland, Burrawinna on the border and Macumba Station in South Australia as part of his plan of acquiring prime grazing lands along areas that watercourses followed. He borrowed A£50,000 to pay the A£100,000 asking price. Kidman and the company Bovril Australian Estates purchased Carlton Hill Station in the Kimberley region of Western Australia in 1909 along with another two stations, one being Northcote and Victoria River Downs in the Northern Territory, for £200,000. Boorara Station was acquired in 1913. Kidman acquired Yancannia Station in far western New South Wales in 1916, followed by Corona Station, also in the far west of New South Wales, in 1917.

In 1916, Kidman invested in Glenroy Station with the owners at the time, Reginald Spong and Jabez Orchard, forming the Glenroy Pastoral Company. He acquired the Urisino station in 1913 along with Elsinora and Thurloo Downs in outback New South Wales from Goldsbrough Mort & Co. In 1924, Kidman acquired Merty Merty Station in outback South Australia.

By the time World War I broke out, Kidman was a millionaire. He was knighted in the 1921 Birthday Honours for his support of the war effort.

Kidman's entrepreneurial initiatives extended to many other rural industries. Probably his only unsuccessful business venture was the Kidman & Mayoh shipyard, which he established with engineer brothers Arthur and Joseph Mayoh in the Sydney suburb of Putney when the Commonwealth Government called for 24 wooden ships to be built by various companies for the war effort. The company employed hundreds of men to fell and square heavy timber on the north coast of New South Wales. With labour in short supply, "bush carpenters" went from the north coast to work in the shipyard, assisting the skilled shipwrights. However, on cessation of hostilities the government reduced Kidman & Mayoh's contract from six to two. Early in 1920 the Australian trading company, Burns Philp, made an offer to the government to buy the two ships. However, the first ship – reported as "the largest wooden ship ever built in Australia" – was damaged on launching and failed to receive its necessary first-class certification. A saga of litigation followed, and the vessels, one stripped of usable timber, were burned in 1923. Kidman lost many thousands of pounds, but was reported to have said that his biggest regret was that the work of the superb axemen of the north coast forests, with their enthusiasm, craftsmanship and loyalty, all went for nothing.

By then known as "the Cattle King", Kidman retired in 1927.

At the time of his death in 1935, Kidman owned, or had a large interest in, land variously stated to have covered from 85,000 square miles (220,000 km^{2}) to 107,000 square miles (280,000 km^{2}), the latter figure equating to 3.7 per cent of the area of Australia's mainland. On 68 separate stations were stocked about 176,000 head of cattle and 215,000 head of sheep. They comprised a vast network from both the Gulf of Carpentaria and the Fitzroy River in Western Australia down into South Australia near the Flinders Ranges and also across New South Wales. He was well served by his vision of drought-proofing his empire through growing and fattening cattle on the remote stations in the north and bringing them down the lines of stations along the great inland river systems to markets in the south, providing good feed and water on the way to sell them in top condition.

== Character ==
Kidman was most at home around the campfire but comfortable with civic leaders. He animated extraordinary loyalty from his employees; working for Kidman was a "sort of badge of pride".

== Death ==
Following a brief illness, Sidney Kidman died at his home at 76 Northgate Street, Millswood (now Unley Park), aged 78, on 2 September 1935. His body was interred at the Mitcham Cemetery in the presence of hundreds of mourners; his cortege extended for more than 1.5 miles (2.4 km). He left most of his £300,000 estate to his family and to charities.

== Legacy ==
Kidman donated his home in Kapunda, which he acquired around 1900 and called Eringa after Eringa Station, to the Education Department in 1921. It was used as the administration building for the Kapunda High School, later heritage-listed, and extensively renovated in 2011–12. The building was gutted by fire on the night of 29 March 2022, with extensive damage to the roof.

The Adelaide suburb of Kidman Park was named in his honour. The Kidman Way, a rural road in the western region of New South Wales, part of which was historically used by Kidman and his business enterprise as stock routes, carries his name. The pub in Kapunda, South Australia, was named the Sir Sidney Kidman Hotel before it became the North Kapunda Hotel.

S. Kidman & Co is still the largest private landholder in Australia, although on a much smaller scale. The entire landholding was placed up for sale in 2015: eleven cattle stations covering more than 100,000 square kilometres (38,610 sq mi) and a herd of 155,000 cattle. The total value of the company was estimated at A$360 million. Two Chinese companies, Genius Link Asset Management and Shanghai Pengxin, sought to acquire the company, but the sale was eventually blocked by the Treasurer of Australia, Scott Morrison who cited the national interest clause in the Foreign Investment Act. In 2016, the company was purchased by Hancock Prospecting (67%) and Shanghai CRED (33%).

In 1992, Kidman's Tree of Knowledge, at Glengyle Station, Bedourie, Queensland, was listed on the Queensland Heritage Register. Kidman is believed to have camped under the tree while planning his pastoral empire in Queensland.

Kidman’s ‘stonehouse’ childhood home in Athelstone was a heritage listed Building of Adelaide up until 2024 when it was demolished in early May. The home was sold and bought in the early-mid 1980s and rented out to local tenants. A Female tenant, who was last to live in the home, was broken into and raped on a warm night in about 1985–86. Since then it was never rented out again. The house was sold and bought again (dates unknown). The next owner of the house at the time started renovation to the house in the early 1990s, adding a front section of rooms made of brick. After an issue with the contracted bricklayers the house was left un-renovated, un-completed and left to perish in the weather, with piles of brand new bricks and over growing plants for over 30 years. The owner would then agree to sell the property in 2024 with it being forced to be demolished due to unrepairable damage. The house was flattened in May 2024 ready to be turned into housing development.

== In popular culture ==
In 1936, a biography of Kidman titled The Cattle King, by Ion Idriess, was published; it became a best-seller.
