= Simpson Desert (disambiguation) =

Simpson Desert is a desert located in central Australia.

Simpson Desert may also refer to the following:

- Simpson Desert, South Australia, a locality
- Simpson Desert Conservation Park, a protected area in South Australia now part of Munga-Thirri–Simpson Desert National Park
- Simpson Desert Important Bird Area, a designation associated with protected areas within the Simpson Desert
- Simpson Desert National Park, a protected area in Queensland now called Munga-Thirri National Park
- Simpson Desert Regional Reserve, a former protected area in South Australia known as Munga-Thirri–Simpson Desert Regional Reserve, now part of Munga-Thirri—Simpson Desert National Park

== See also ==
- Simpson (disambiguation)
