= Regional reserves of South Australia =

Class of protected area in South Australia

A Regional Reserve is a type of protected area used in South Australia that allows the use of natural resources in conjunction with the protected area's conservation function. This class of protected area was first used in 1988 for the Innamincka Regional Reserve and as of 2015, there are seven regional reserves that cover an area of 93,400 square kilometres (36,062 sq mi) or 9.5% of South Australia's land area.

== Description ==
Regional reserves are multiple-use protected areas where natural and cultural features can be conserved, but the resources of the reserve can also be used.

== History ==
The category of protected area (known as a “reserve” in South Australia) known as regional reserve was created in 1987 by the South Australian Government in order to achieve a balance between “nature conservation and the use of natural resources”. The first use of the regional reserve category was the Innamincka Regional Reserve in 1988 which is located in the part of the state containing both a “place of major conservation importance”, the Coongie Lakes wetland system which is listed as a Ramsar site, and primary production activity consisting of petroleum product extraction at Moomba and beef cattle production on the Innamincka Station. The National Parks and Wildlife Act 1972 was amended in 1987 to create this reserve category along with the additional requirements of seeking Parliamentary approval to abolish or remove land from a regional reserve and the tabling of periodic reporting on a 10-year basis in the Parliament of South Australia. The reporting is twofold - firstly, an assessment of “the impact of the utilisation of natural resources on the conservation of the wildlife and the natural and historic features of the reserve” is required and secondly, an assessment of the benefit achieved by the state economy by the use of the natural resources is required. As of 30 June 2015, the seven regional reserves have been declared by the Government of South Australia covering an area of 93,400 square kilometres (36,100 square miles) or 9.5% of the state's land area.

== List of regional reserves ==
As of 2014, all of the following regional reserves were classified as IUCN Category VI protected areas.

| Regional reserve name | Coordinates | Area | Start date | Remarks |
|---|---|---|---|---|
| Chowilla | 33°40′09″S 140°50′46″E | 752.21 square kilometres (290 sq mi) | 8 April 1993 | The Chowilla Regional Reserve is located about 250 kilometres (160 miles) north-east of the centre of Adelaide, the capital of South Australia and about 50 kilometres (31 miles) north-east of the town of Renmark. Its role is the protection and conservation of the semi-arid landscape to the north of the Murray River. Land uses within the regional reserve consist of “pastoral production, conservation of natural and historic features and tourism/recreation”. |
| Innamincka | 27°27′49″S 140°31′48″E | 13,493.33 square kilometres (5,210 sq mi) | 22 December 1988 | The Innamincka Regional Reserve is located about 860 kilometres (530 miles) north-east of the centre of Adelaide adjoining the border with Queensland. Its role is the protection of the” arid wetlands of the Cooper Creek system”. Land uses within the regional reserve consist of “conservation of wildlife, landscape and historic features, petroleum production, tourism and pastoral production”. |
| Lake Frome (historical) | 30°43′52″S 139°48′40″E | 2,582.40 square kilometres (997 sq mi) | 19 December 1991 | The Lake Frome Regional Reserve is located about 440 kilometres (270 miles) north-east of the centre of Adelaide between the Vulkathunha-Gammon Ranges National Park in the west and the southern extent of Strzelecki Desert in the east. Its role is the conservation of “a large arid salt lake system that is of regional geological significance”. Land uses within the regional reserve consist of "biological and cultural conservation". Upgraded to a national park on 26 November 2021. |
| Nullarbor | 30°53′34″S 131°19′44″E | 19,198.51 square kilometres (7,413 sq mi) | 31 August 1989 | The Nullarbor Regional Reserve is located about 1,000 kilometres (620 miles) west of centre of Adelaide on land bounded by the border with Western Australia in the west, the continental coastline adjoining the Great Australian Bight in the south and the Trans-Australian Railway in the north. Its role is the conservation of “the largest semi-arid karst landscape in the world and environments of the Nullarbor Plain” as well as the “endemic cave-dwelling species and other endangered wildlife, including one of the largest populations of the southern hairy-nosed wombat in Australia”. Land uses within the regional reserve consist of “conservation of the wildlife, landscape and historic features, mineral exploration and tourism”. |
| Munga-Thirri—Simpson Desert (historical) | 27°31′54″S 137°56′05″E | 29,239.53 square kilometres (11,289 sq mi) | 24 October 1985 | The Munga-Thirri–Simpson Desert Regional Reserve is located about 820 km (510 mi) north of centre of Adelaide on land adjoining the Witjira National Park in the west, Munga-Thirri—Simpson Desert Conservation Park which it completely surrounds in the east and the border with the Northern Territory in the north. Its role is the conservation of “a variety of landforms including dunal systems, extensive playa lakes and associated vegetation and wildlife”. Land uses within the regional reserve consist of “biological conservation and recreational tourism”. As of November 2021 part of Munga-Thirri—Simpson Desert Conservation Park. |
| Strzelecki | 28°44′29″S 139°40′34″E | 8,104.22 square kilometres (3,129 sq mi) | 19 December 1991 | The Strzelecki Regional Reserve is located about 650 kilometres (400 miles) north-east of the centre of Adelaide on land in the Strzelecki Desert and immediately north of Lake Blanche. Its role is the conservation of “Strzelecki Desert environments, including the Strzelecki Creek, in the centre of the reserve, which is an overflow of the Cooper Creek and a major feeder stream of Lake Blanche (a shallow freshwater ephemeral lake).” Land uses within the regional reserve consist of “biological conservation, recreational tourism and petroleum exploration and production.” |
| Yellabinna | 30°53′14″S 132°33′12″E | 20,008.97 square kilometres (7,726 sq mi) | 25 January 1990 | The Yellabinna Regional Reserve is located about 750 kilometres (470 miles) north-west of the centre of Adelaide on land located between the Eyre Highway in the south and the Trans-Australian Railway in the north. Its role is the conservation of “part of a contiguous area of over 4 million ha of largely mallee vegetation with high wilderness values” which it shares with the Pureba Conservation Park, the Yellabinna Wilderness Protection Area and the Yumbarra Conservation Park. Land uses within the regional reserve consist of “wildlife, landscape and historic features, mineral exploration and tourism”. |

== See also ==
- Protected areas of South Australia

== Citations and references ==
=== References ===
- "Terrestrial Protected Areas of South Australia (see 'DETAIL' tab)". CAPAD 2014. Australian Government - Department of the Environment. 2014.
- "Innamincka Regional Reserve Management Plan" (PDF). Department of Environment & Land Management. 1993.
- "Yellabinna Reserves Management Plan" (PDF). Department of Environment, Water and Natural Resources. 2013.
- "Protected Areas of South Australia September (Map) 2014 Edition" (PDF). Department of Environment, Water and Natural Resources. 2014.
- "Protected Areas Information System - Area Statement: Summary of Protected Areas In South Australia (as of 16 July 2015)" (PDF). Department of Environment Water and Natural Resources. 2015.
- "Regional reserves". Department of Environment Water and Natural Resources. 2015a.
- "Protected Areas Information System - reserve list (as of 16 July 2015)" (PDF). Department of Environment Water and Natural Resources. 2015b.
