= Munga-Thirri =

Munga-Thirri may refer to:

- Munga-Thirri National Park, Queensland, Australia
- Munga-Thirri–Simpson Desert National Park, South Australia
- Munga-Thirri–Simpson Desert Regional Reserve, a former regional reserve, now part of Munga-Thirri–Simpson Desert National Park
