= Ethabuka Reserve =

Protected area of Queensland, Australia

- IUCN category II (national park)
- Location within Queensland
- Location: Queensland
- Nearest city: Bedourie, Queensland
- Coordinates: 23°50′13″S 138°15′22.3″E
- Area: 2,156.63 km^{2} (832.68 sq mi)
- Established: 2004
- Governing body: Bush Heritage Australia
- Website: Official website

Ethabuka Reserve is a 213,300 ha (527,000-acre) nature reserve on Wangkamahdla Country in Central West Queensland, Australia, 157 km (98 mi) north-west of Bedourie, 336 km (209 mi) south-west of Boulia and 639 km (397 mi) south of Mount Isa. It lies at the northern end of the Simpson Desert with its western boundary bordering the Northern Territory. The reserve is owned and managed by the nature conservation charity Bush Heritage Australia, who also own the adjacent property, Pilungah Reserve.

== History ==
Ethabuka was offered as a pastoral lease from 1910, though it was not taken up until 1946. It was operated as a beef cattle station until acquisition by Bush Heritage in 2004. In October 2026 Ethabuka was declared a Special Wildlife Reserve by the Queensland Government.

== Landscape ==
Ethabuka is characterised by dunefields and the associated swales, with clay and gibber floodplains. It contains the nationally significant Pulchera waterhole, a semi-permanent wetland fed by the ephemeral Mulligan River. Vegetation communities include gidgee woodlands.

== Fauna ==
Ethabuka is rich in desert wildlife. Mammals recorded on the property include the mulgara, Forrest's mouse, spinifex hopping mouse, brown desert mouse and sandy inland mouse. Reptiles include the woma python. Threatened bird species recorded are the Australian bustard, yellow chat, painted honeyeater and chestnut quail-thrush. The reserve is part of the Simpson Desert Important Bird Area (IBA), identified as such by BirdLife International for its importance in conserving suitable habitat for Eyrean grasswrens.

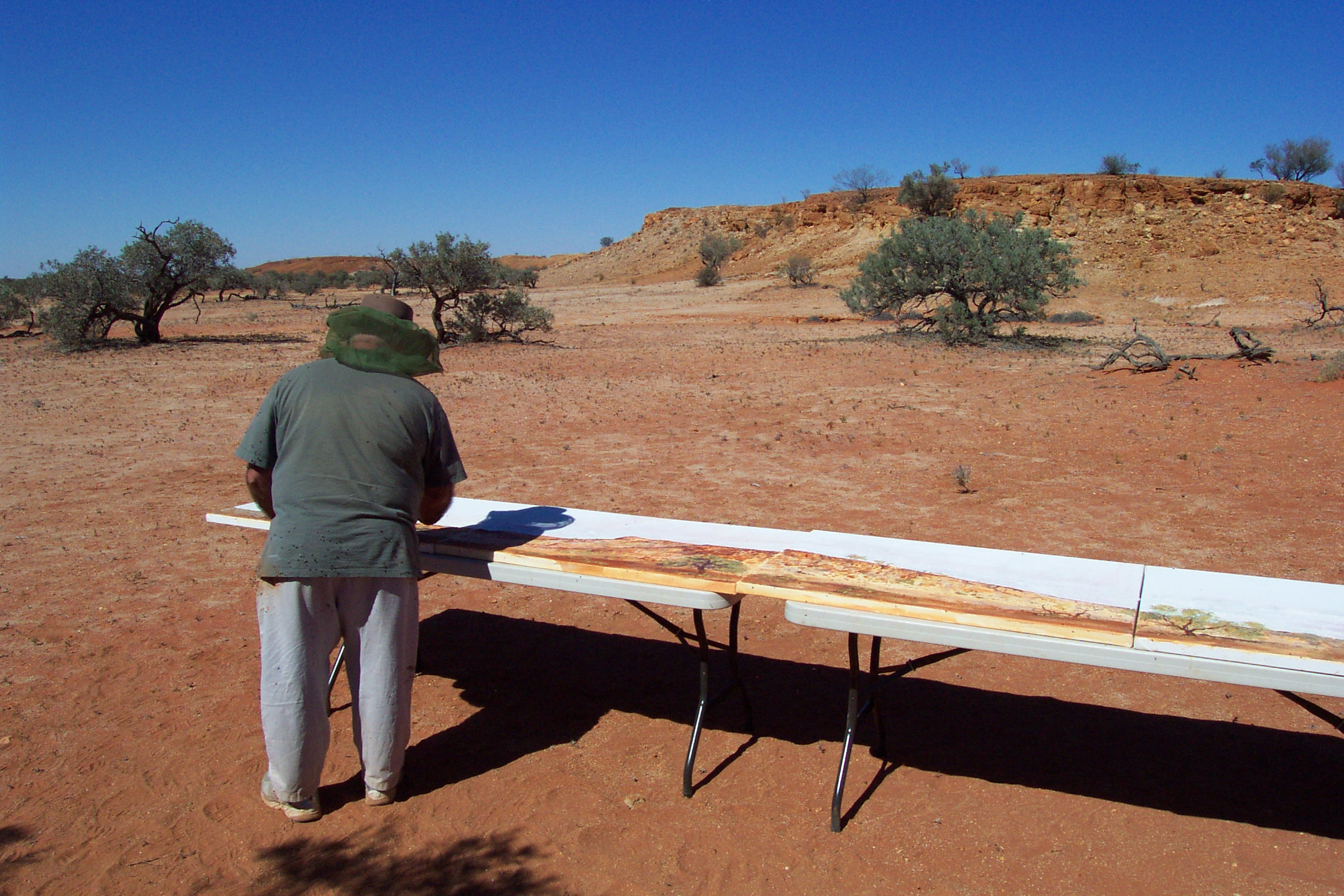
Artist at Ethabuka Nature Reserve
