= Lake Frome =

Lake in South Australia

Lake Frome / Munda
- Munda (Adnyamathanha)
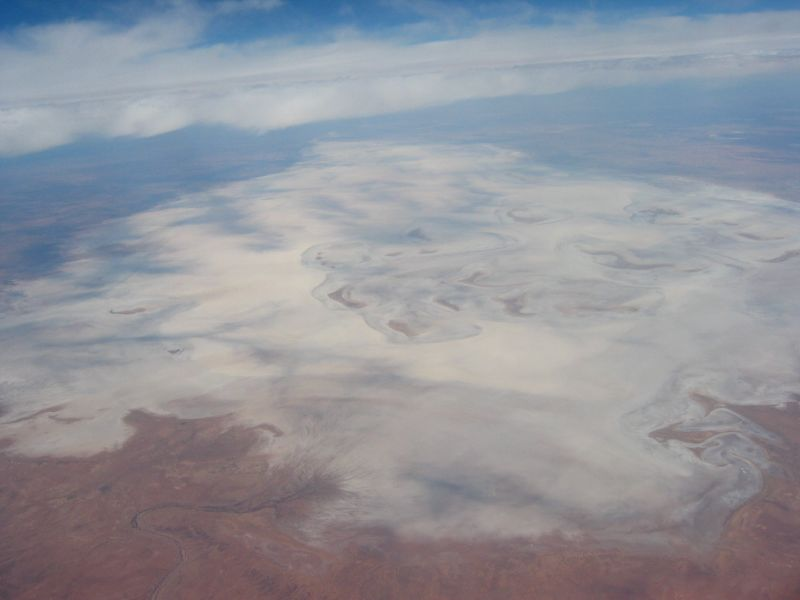
- Aerial view of Lake Frome / Munda

- Location in South Australia
- Location: South Australia
- Coordinates: 30°37′S 139°52′E
- Type: Endorheic
- Basin countries: Australia
- Designation: Lake Frome Regional Reserve
- Max. length: 100 km (62 mi)
- Max. width: 40 km (25 mi)
- Surface area: 2,596.15 km^{2} (1,002.38 sq mi)
- Max. depth: 0.5 metres (1 ft 8 in)
- Surface elevation: 1 metre (3 ft 3 in)

Lake Frome / Munda is a large endorheic lake in the Australian state of South Australia to the east of the Northern Flinders Ranges. It is a large, shallow, unvegetated salt pan, 100 kilometres (62 mi) long and 40 kilometres (25 mi) wide, lying mostly below sea level and having a total surface area of 259,615 hectares (641,520 acres). It only rarely fills with brackish water flowing down usually dry creeks in the Northern Flinders Ranges from the west, or exceptional flows down the Strzelecki Creek from the north.

The Adnyamathanha name for the lake is Munda. Europeans named the lake Frome after Edward Charles Frome, after he mapped the area in 1843. The lake was officially dual named Lake Frome / Munda in 2004.

== Description ==
Satellite image of the lake.

The lake adjoins Vulkathunha-Gammon Ranges National Park to its west and lies adjacent to Lake Callabonna linked by Salt Creek to its north, the southern Strzelecki Desert to its east, and the Frome Downs pastoral lease to its south. The ancient Lake Mega-Frome (Lakes Frome, Blanche, Callabonna and Gregory) was last connected to Lake Eyre 50–47 thousand years ago. The region in which it is situated has little rainfall and is very sparsely settled, with the closest settlement to it being Arkaroola Village some 40 kilometres (25 mi) north-west of its closest shore.

Public road access to the lake is limited to a single, rough four-wheel drive track which commences from the Vulkathunha-Gammon Ranges National Park headquarters at Balcanoona (Virlkundhunha) station 30 kilometres (19 mi) west. The route to Lake Frome traverses flat, stony terrain following Balcanoona Creek through the only completely protected arid catchment in Australia. After crossing both the Moomba-Adelaide natural gas pipeline and the dingo fence the track passes over low sand dunes before arriving at the western shore of the lake. The protected area through which this access track travels is declared a Cultural Use zone for hunting by the local Adnyamathanha Aboriginal people between 3.00 pm and 5.00 am; during this period public access is prohibited.

Munda forms part of the local Dreaming story told by the Adnyamathanha people explaining how the region's geology and species originated. According to this Dreaming story, Munda was emptied of its water by the Rainbow Serpent Akurra when he ventured down Arkaroola Creek (which flows onto Munda) to drink. Due to its Dreamtime significance the Adnyamathanha do not venture onto the lake's surface.

== Protected area status ==
Due to its "regional geological significance" the full extent of the lake was proclaimed as the Lake Frome Regional Reserve in 1991.

On 26 November 2021, the reserve's status was upgraded to a national park in recognition of its significance as a large salt lake, becoming Lake Frome National Park and giving it the same status as other large salt lakes such as Kati Thanda-Lake Eyre, Lake Torrens and Lake Gairdner.

== See also ==
- List of lakes of Australia § South Australia
