= Crust (geology) =

Outermost solid shell of astronomical bodies

The internal structure of Earth

In geology, the crust is the outermost solid shell of a planet, dwarf planet, or natural satellite. It is usually distinguished from the underlying mantle by its chemical makeup; however, in the case of icy satellites, it may be defined based on its phase (solid crust vs. liquid mantle).

The crusts of Earth, Mercury, Venus, Mars, Io, the Moon and other planetary bodies formed via igneous processes and were later modified by erosion, impact cratering, volcanism, and sedimentation.

Most terrestrial planets have fairly uniform crusts. Earth, however, has two distinct types: continental crust and oceanic crust. These two types have different chemical compositions and physical properties and were formed by different geological processes.

== Types of crust ==
Planetary geologists divide crust into three categories based on how and when it formed.

=== Primary crust / primordial crust ===
This is a planet's "original" crust. It forms from solidification of a magma ocean. Toward the end of planetary accretion, the terrestrial planets likely had surfaces that were magma oceans. As these cooled, they solidified into crust. This crust was likely destroyed by large impacts and re-formed many times as the Era of Heavy Bombardment drew to a close.

The nature of primary crust is still debated: its chemical, mineralogic, and physical properties are unknown, as are the igneous mechanisms that formed them. This is because it is difficult to study: none of Earth's primary crust has survived to today. Earth's high rates of erosion and crustal recycling from plate tectonics has destroyed all rocks older than about 4 billion years, including whatever primary crust Earth once had.

However, geologists can glean information about primary crust by studying it on other terrestrial planets. Mercury's highlands might represent primary crust, though this is debated. The anorthosite highlands of the Moon are primary crust, formed as plagioclase crystallized out of the Moon's initial magma ocean and floated to the top; however, it is unlikely that Earth followed a similar pattern, as the Moon was a water-less system and Earth had water. The Martian meteorite ALH84001 might represent primary crust of Mars; however, again, this is debated. Like Earth, Venus lacks primary crust, as the entire planet has been repeatedly resurfaced and modified.

=== Secondary crust ===
Secondary crust is formed by partial melting of mostly silicate materials in the mantle, and so is usually basaltic in composition.

This is the most common type of crust in the Solar System. Most of the surfaces of Mercury, Venus, Earth, and Mars comprise secondary crust, as do the lunar maria. On Earth secondary crust forms primarily at mid-ocean spreading centers, where the adiabatic rise of mantle causes partial melting.

=== Tertiary crust ===
Tertiary crust is more chemically-modified than either primary or secondary. It can form in several ways:

- Igneous processes: partial-melting of secondary crust, coupled with differentiation or dehydration
- Erosion and sedimentation: sediments derived from primary, secondary, or tertiary crust

The only known example of tertiary crust is the continental crust of the Earth. It is unknown whether other terrestrial planets can be said to have tertiary crust, though the evidence so far suggests that they do not. This is likely because plate tectonics is needed to create tertiary crust, and Earth is the only planet in the Solar System with plate tectonics.

== Earth's crust ==
Plates in the crust of Earth

Earth's crust is a thin shell on the outside of Earth, accounting for less than 1% of Earth's volume. It is the top component of the lithosphere, a division of Earth's layers that includes the crust and the upper part of the mantle. The lithosphere is broken into tectonic plates that move, allowing heat to escape from the interior of Earth into space.

== Moon's crust ==
A theoretical protoplanet named "Theia" is thought to have collided with the forming Earth, and part of the material ejected into space by the collision accreted to form the Moon. As the Moon formed, the outer part of it is thought to have been molten, a "lunar magma ocean". Plagioclase feldspar crystallized in large amounts from this magma ocean and floated toward the surface. The cumulate rocks form much of the crust. The upper part of the crust probably averages about 88% plagioclase (near the lower limit of 90% defined for anorthosite): the lower part of the crust may contain a higher percentage of ferromagnesian minerals such as the pyroxenes and olivine, but even that lower part probably averages about 78% plagioclase. The underlying mantle is denser and olivine-rich.

The thickness of the crust ranges between about 20 and 120 km. Crust on the far side of the Moon averages about 12 km thicker than that on the near side. Estimates of average thickness fall in the range from about 50 to 60 km. Most of this plagioclase-rich crust formed shortly after formation of the Moon, between about 4.5 and 4.3 billion years ago. Perhaps 10% or less of the crust consists of igneous rock added after the formation of the initial plagioclase-rich material. The best-characterized and most voluminous of these later additions are the mare basalts formed between about 3.9 and 3.2 billion years ago. Minor volcanism continued after 3.2 billion years, perhaps as recently as 1 billion years ago. There is no evidence of plate tectonics.

Study of the Moon has established that a crust can form on a rocky planetary body significantly smaller than Earth. Although the radius of the Moon is only about a quarter that of Earth, the lunar crust has a significantly greater average thickness. This thick crust formed almost immediately after formation of the Moon. Magmatism continued after the period of intense meteorite impacts ended about 3.9 billion years ago, but igneous rocks younger than 3.9 billion years make up only a minor part of the crust.

== See also ==
- Eduction
