= Acacia calcicola =

Shrubby wattle

Scientific classification
- Kingdom: Plantae
- Clade: Tracheophytes
- Clade: Angiosperms
- Clade: Eudicots
- Clade: Rosids
- Order: Fabales
- Family: Fabaceae
- Subfamily: Caesalpinioideae
- Clade: Mimosoid clade
- Genus: Acacia
- Species: A. calcicola

Binomial name
- Acacia calcicola Forde & Ising
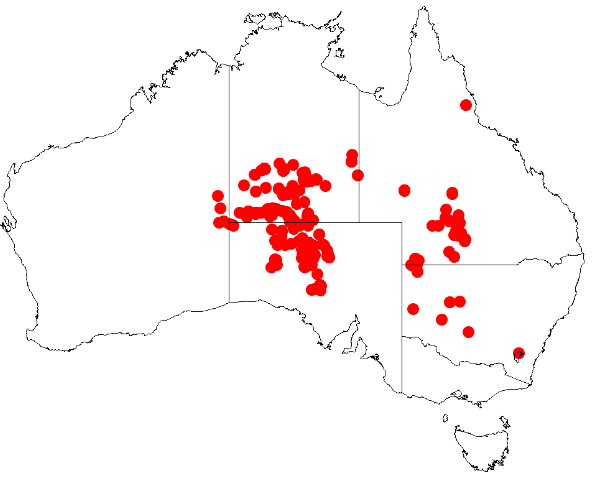
- Occurrence data from AVH

Synonyms
- Racosperma calcicola (Forde & Ising) Pedley; Acacia coriacea auct. non DC.: Black, J.M. (January 1948)

Species of plant

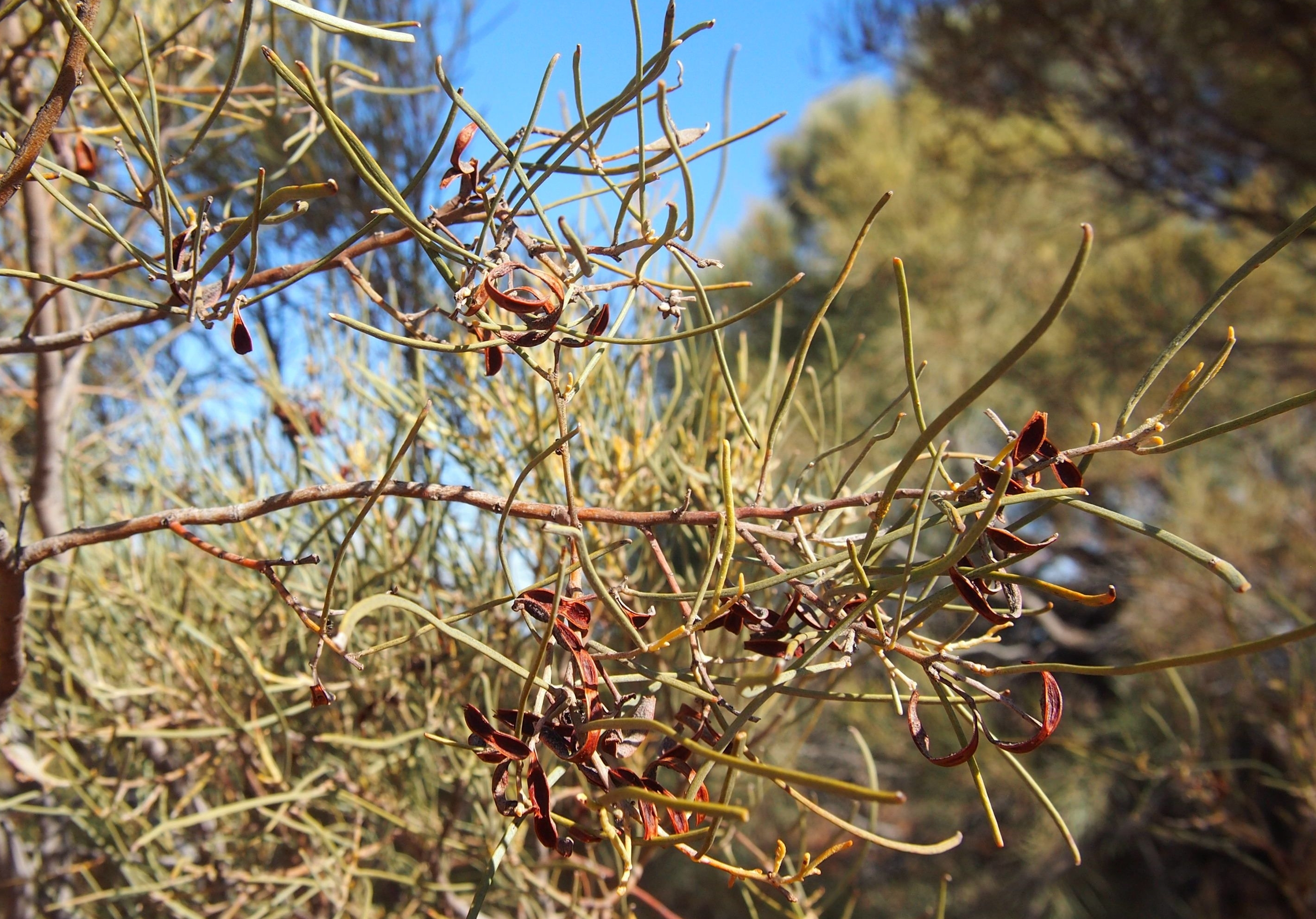
Foliage and fruit

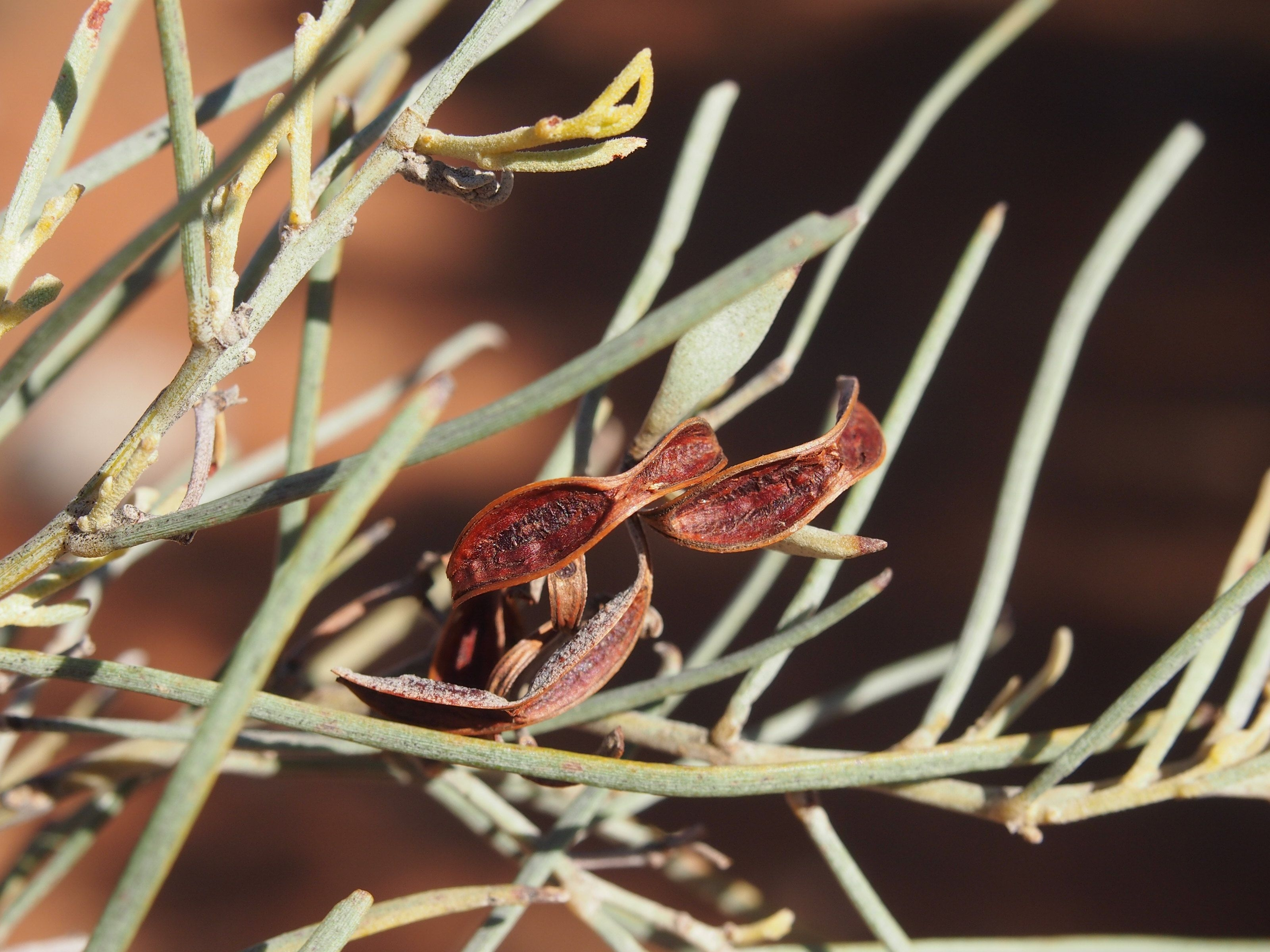
Seed pods

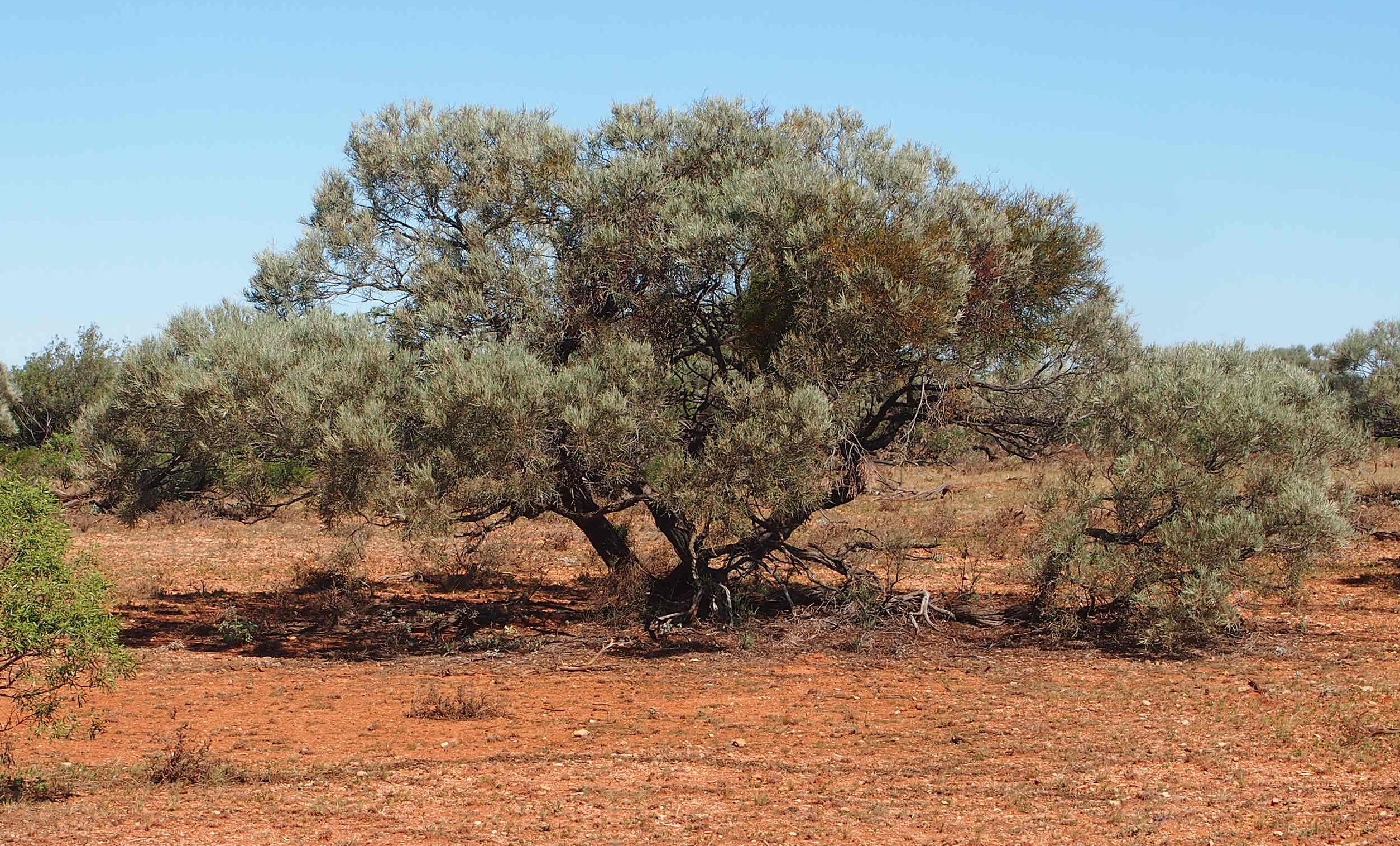
Habit

Acacia calcicola, commonly known as shrubby wattle, shrubby mulga, myall-gidgee, northern myall and grey myall is a species of flowering plant in the family Fabaceae and is native to arid areas of central Australia. The Pitjantjatjara peoples know the tree as ikatuka, the Warlpiri know it as jirlarti and the Arrernte know it as irrakwetye. It is a rounded shrub or straggly tree, with narrowly linear, linear or very narrowly elliptic phyllodes, spherical heads of golden yellow flowers, and more or less woody pods resembling a string of beads up to 120 mm (4.7 in) long.

== Description ==
Acacia calcicola is rounded shrub or straggly tree that typically grows to a height of 1.5 to 6 metres (5 to 20 ft) and often has multiple stems at the base and a spreading bushy crown. The phyllodes are variably shaped, narrowly linear to linear or very narrowly elliptic, straight to slightly curved, 50–140 mm (2.0–5.5 in) long and 1–10 mm (0.039–0.394 in) wide. The phyllodes have a more or less hooked end and are leathery and densely covered with soft hairs pressed against the surface. The flower are borne in 2 to 5 spherical heads in racemes 3–15 mm (0.12–0.59 in) long on a peduncle 2–8 mm (0.079–0.315 in) long. Each head is 3–4 mm (0.12–0.16 in) in diameter and has 30 to 60 golden yellow flowers. Flowering occurs from August to December and the pods are up to 120 mm (4.7 in) long, 4–8 mm (0.16–0.31 in) wide, wrinkled and woody, resembling a string of beads. The seeds are dull brown, elliptic and 6 to 8 mm (0.24 to 0.31 in) long with a club-shaped aril.

This species is closely related to Acacia cana which has silvery young phyllodes, and to Acacia coriacea which has longer phyllodes.

== Taxonomy ==
Acacia calcicola was first formally described 1958 by Neville Forde and Ernest Horace Ising in the Transactions of the Royal Society of South Australia from specimens collected by Ising 90 mi (140 km) by road south-west of Oodnadatta. The specific epithet (calcicola) refers to the calcareous soils with which the species is commonly associated.

== Distribution and habitat ==
This species of wattle is widespread in arid central Australia and is found in the southern Northern Territory the Central Ranges, Great Sandy Desert, Great Victoria Desert bioregions of Western Australia, central-western South Australia, near Tibooburra in the far north-west of New South Wales with scattered populations in south-west Queensland. It grows along ephemeral watercourses and on degraded sand dunes as part of low open woodland and tall open shrubland communities. It grows well in heavy calcareous soils usually over limestone and is often associated with Acacia aneura.

== See also ==
- List of Acacia species
