= Innamincka =

Innamincka may refer to:

- Innamincka, South Australia, a town and locality
- Innamincka Airport, an airport in South Australia (refer List of airports in Australia)
- Innamincka Regional Reserve, a protected area in South Australia
- Innamincka Station, a pastoral lease in South Australia
