= Pilungah Reserve =

Australian nature reserve

- Cravens Peak Reserve
- IUCN category II (national park)
- Location within Queensland
- Location: Queensland
- Nearest city: Bedourie, Queensland
- Coordinates: 23°19′22.9″S 138°35′25.0″E
- Area: 2,311.89 km^{2} (892.63 sq mi)
- Established: 2005
- Governing body: Bush Heritage Australia
- Website: Official website

Pilungah Reserve, formerly Cravens Peak Reserve, is a nature reserve in Central West Queensland, Australia, owned by the nature conservation charity Bush Heritage Australia. The reserve is 135 km (84 mi) south-west of Boulia and 471 km (293 mi) south of Mount Isa and lies at the northern end of the Simpson Desert and includes parts of the bioregions known as the Simpson Strzelecki Dunefields and Channel Country. Its western boundary borders the Northern Territory.

== History ==
Pilungah contains fish fossils from the Devonian period, specifically from Cravens Peak Beds.

The traditional owners of Pilungah are the Wangkamadla (also spelt Wanggamala, Wangkamahdla, Wongkamala) people. The area was at the heart of the trade route stretching from the Gulf of Carpentaria in the north right down to South Australia along which the local narcotic plant, pituri, was exchanged for stone knives, seashells, and daggers made out of the tusks of dugongs. Rock paintings and significant sites exist in the reserve.

It later became a pastoral lease that was operated as a beef cattle station until acquisition by Bush Heritage, and named Cravens Peak Reserve. It has been owned and managed by Bush Heritage Australia since 2005, when they purchased it using a bequest by Gay Bell. A reason for acquisition of the property was the need to help conserve the Mulligan River catchment. The reserve lies adjacent to Ethabuka Reserve, acquired by Bush Heritage in 2004.

Len and Joanna Rule were the Bush Heritage managers from 2006 to 2008.

Bush Heritage have nurtured and developed relationships with the Wangkamadla people since 2009, and in 2014 signed a Cultural Heritage Management Agreement with them.

In October 2021, the reserve was renamed Pilungah Reserve, the name taken from a freshwater spring that was culturally significant to the Wangkamadla people, the traditional owners of the land, before it was destroyed by a former owner of the property. In July 2021, the Wangkamahdla people won native title rights to over 3,000,000 ha (7,400,000 acres) west and southwest of Boulia, stretching from around Bedourie, Queensland, across to the Northern Territory border, including Cravens Peak and part of the Munga-Thirri National Park.

In March 2026 Pilungah was designated a Special Wildlife Reserve by the Queensland Government.

== Landscape and ecology ==
Pilungah is composed of rocky hills and plains, with the Toomba Range of the western section being the highest and most rugged, and the eastern section dominated by dunefields and the associated swales, with gibber plains in the south. There are ephemeral claypans and waterholes in the catchment of the Mulligan River.

Management needs to address previous overgrazing, control of introduced herbivores and predators, as well as fire ecology.

== Flora and fauna ==
The relatively moist environment provides an oasis and retreat for desert animals when it is too dry for them.

Vegetation communities include Mitchell grass plains; coolabah and gidgee woodlands; mallee; and hummock (spinifex) and Mitchell grass plains.

The reserve is part of the Simpson Desert Important Bird Area (IBA), identified as such by BirdLife International for its importance in conserving suitable habitat for Eyrean grasswrens. Other birds include the grey falcon, painted finch, Australian bustard, and spinifex pigeon. The claypans and waterholes are important for waterfowl conservation.

The reserve is also home to an abundance of reptiles, including the rare Woma python, Ariadna's ctenotus (a rare skink), and the ridge-tailed monitor, as well as the marsupials such as the vulnerable nocturnal mulgara and the tiny inland ningaui.
