= Regional Reserve (Australia) =

Type of protected area of some Australian jurisdictions

A Regional Reserve is a type of protected area used in the Australian states of South Australia and Tasmania that allows the use of natural resources in conjunction with the protected area's conservation function.

== South Australia ==
In South Australia, a regional reserve is used where crown land being considered for protection where following needs and desires for the land exist:

the purpose of conserving any wildlife or the natural or historic features of that land while, at the same time, permitting the utilisation of the natural resources of that land.

As of 2014, the following regional reserves had been declared, with a total area of 9,340,161 hectares (23,080,040 acres), or 9.5% of the state's land area: Chowilla, Innamincka, Lake Frome, Nullarbor, Munga-Thirri–Simpson Desert, Strzelecki and Yellabinna.

In November 2021, Munga-Thirri–Simpson Desert Regional Reserve became part of the new Munga-Thirri–Simpson Desert National Park, and Lake Frome Regional Reserve was upgraded to a national park as Lake Frome National Park.

== Tasmania ==
In Tasmania, a regional reserve is used where “an area of land” being considered for protection has “high mineral potential or prospectivity” and is “predominantly in a natural state,” and the purpose for the protection meets the following requirement:

Mineral exploration and the development of mineral deposits in the area of land, and the controlled use of other natural resources of that area of land, including special species timber harvesting, while protecting and maintaining the natural and cultural values of that area of land.

As of 2014, there are 148 regional reserves in Tasmania with a total area of 454,682 hectares (1,123,540 acres):

== See also ==
- Protected areas of South Australia
- Protected areas of Tasmania
