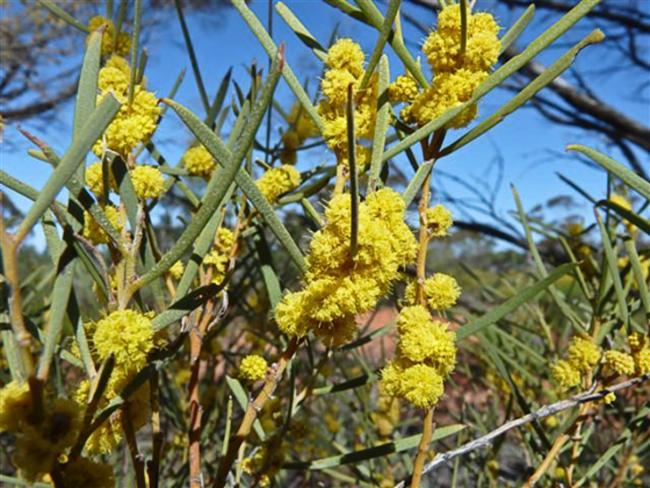

Conservation status
- Least Concern (IUCN 3.1)

Scientific classification
- Kingdom: Plantae
- Clade: Tracheophytes
- Clade: Angiosperms
- Clade: Eudicots
- Clade: Rosids
- Order: Fabales
- Family: Fabaceae
- Subfamily: Caesalpinioideae
- Clade: Mimosoid clade
- Genus: Acacia
- Species: A. cana

Binomial name
- Acacia cana Maiden
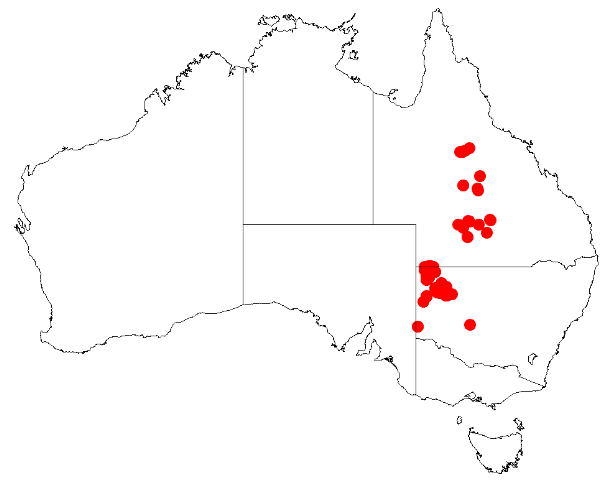
- Occurrence data from AVH

Synonyms
- Acacia eremea Maiden nom. illeg.; Racosperma canum (Maiden) Pedley

= Acacia cana =

Cabbage-tree wattle

Species of legume

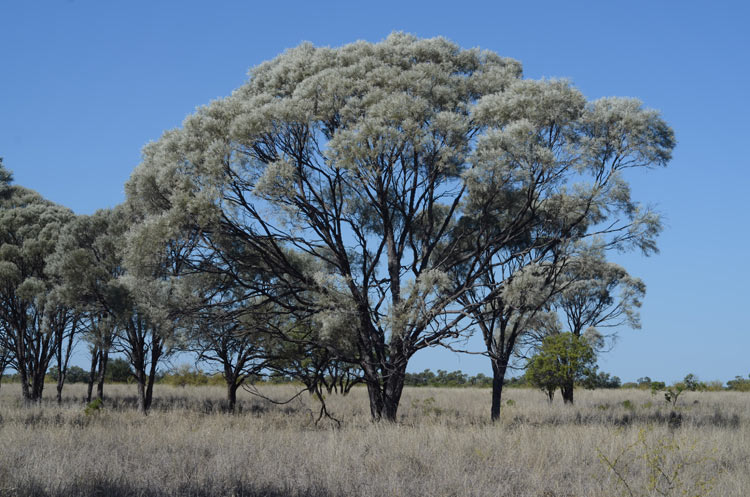
Habit near Blackall

Acacia cana, commonly known as boree, cabbage-tree wattle or broad-leaved nealie, is a species of flowering plant in the family Fabaceae and is endemic to eastern Australia. It is a shrub or tree with rigid, linear to very narrowly elliptic phyllodes, spherical heads of bright yellow flowers, and linear, leathery to papery pods.

== Description ==
Acacia cana is a shrub or tree that typically grows to a height of up to 6 m (20 ft) with a dense, spreading crown and often knotty and deformed. The bark is grey and the branchlets covered with silvery hairs pressed against the surface. Its phyllodes are rigid, linear to very narrowly elliptic, 50–130 mm (2.0–5.1 in) long and 2–5 mm (0.079–0.197 in) wide with silvery hairs pressed against the surface. There is an inconspicuous gland at the base of the phyllodes. The flowers are borne in 2 to 6 spherical heads in racemes 1–3 mm (0.039–0.118 in) long on peduncles 3–8 mm (0.12–0.31 in) long. Each head is 4–6.5 mm (0.16–0.26 in) in diameter with 15 to 35 bright yellow flowers. Flowering occurs from August to October, and the pods are more or less curved, leathery to papery, 60–100 mm (2.4–3.9 in) long, 4–6 mm (0.16–0.24 in) wide and constricted between the seeds.

== Taxonomy ==
This species was first formally described in 1920 by Joseph Maiden who gave it the name Acacia eremaea from specimens collected near Milparinka in 1906, but that name was illegitimate because it had already been given to another species by Cecil Andrews. In an erratum in same journal, Maiden substituted the name Acacia cana for A. eremea.

== Distribution and habitat ==
Boree grows in woodland on gibber plains near watercourses and in sandy soil in western New South Wales west of Enngonia and north of Wilcannia, and in southern central Queensland near Adavale.

== Conservation status ==
Acacia cana is listed as of "least concern" by the IUCN Red List and under the Queensland Government Nature Conservation Act 1992.

== Reproduction and dispersal ==
Acacia cana is a perennial plant species that relies on insects for pollination. While dispersal of seeds can also be influenced by ants by either eating the seeds or moving seeds to their habitats. However the seeds are not fully dispersed till the seeds is removed from the legume (pods) which occurs from influences by a hot sun or a bushfire.

== Uses and bush tucker ==
Acacias seeds, roots, and gum are types of aboriginal bush tucker that very nutritious food sources that have unique tastes and provide high levels of protein, carbohydrates and fibre and low levels of fats. Acacia seeds are found to have chocolate-like taste and are best known for being an ingredient for making bread while roots were roasted before eating and the gum was collected and eaten as snack or placed in water to make a flavored drink. Acacias were not only used as bush tucker but as wood for certain aboriginal tools for example hunting and fishing spears. Another use of these native shrubs/trees was for some medical treatments of headaches, fevers and colds.

== See also ==
- List of Acacia species
