= Bore Track =

Bore Track South Australia
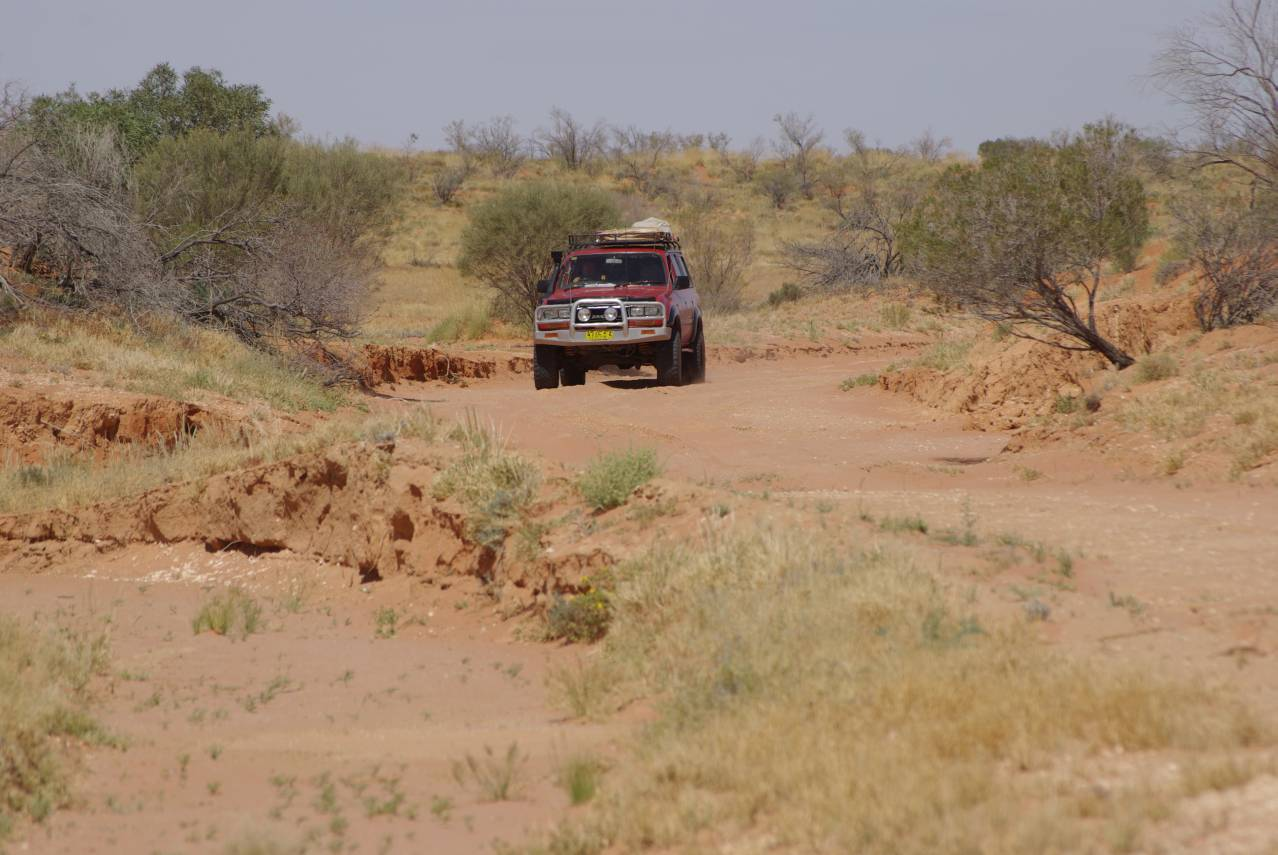
- On Bore Track in the Strzelecki Desert

General information
- Type: Track

Major junctions
- South end: Bollards Lagoon
- North end: Innamincka

Highway system
- Highways in Australia; National Highway • Freeways in Australia; Highways in South Australia

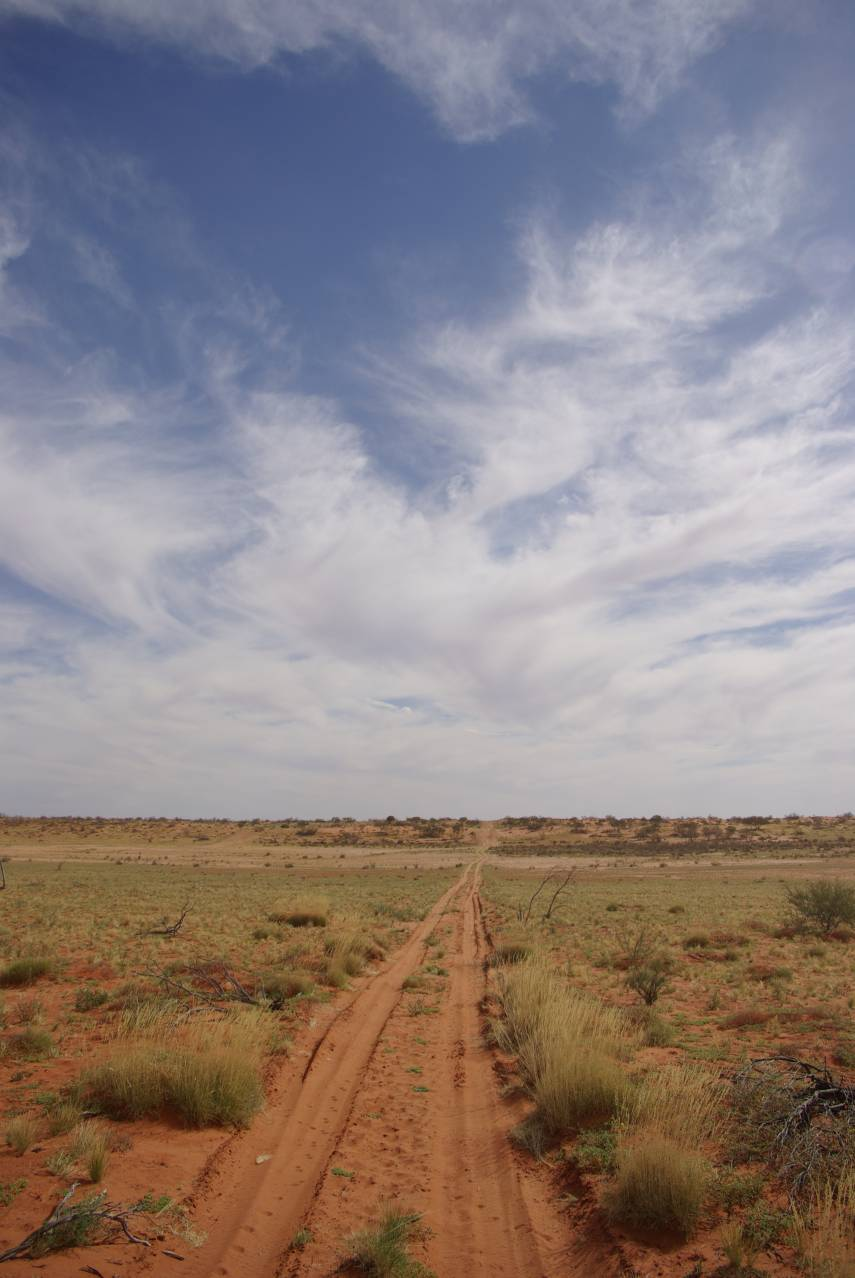
Bore Track in the Strzelecki Desert.

The Bore Track is a 4WD track in South Australia roughly following the Queensland border from Cameron Corner to Innamincka. It is a narrow, rarely used, scenic alternative to the Strzelecki Track, passing through sand dunes and clay pans of the Strzelecki Desert. It is a good preparation for the longer traverse of the Simpson Desert. There are gas fields, pipelines and bores for which the track is the historic access and after which it is named.

== Navigation ==
The best planning for the trip is to download a GPS track, otherwise navigation may be demanding between the many dead ends and commercial pipeline service roads. Good maps are an asset. Parts of the track may be deep dry sand. Coming from Tibooburra it is worth stopping at the Corner Store of Cameron Corner which is the meeting point of New South Wales, Queensland and South Australia. Follow west until the narrow track takes off at Bollards Lagoon towards the north, passing a dry lake. The southern part of the track goes over farmland with cattle here and there, often around water tanks with windmills. The track ends east of Innamincka, where it is only a short drive to the permanent Cullyamurra water hole of Cooper Creek. Update: the southern section, Bollards Lagoon to the Moomba Rd is now closed to the public.

== Camping ==
Fuel and water should be filled for the number of days planned. Although Cameron's Corner to Innamincka could be made easily in a day.

== Wildlife ==
Especially after rain, the desert flourishes for months with yellow flowers on the dunes and high grass land in the dips. A few small trees or bushes scatter over the landscape and give protections for many birds. Swarms of green and yellow budgerigars can be observed in the evening hours, which are here in their most natural habitat. There may be geckos, lizards and snakes around which can either be seen directly of by reading their trace in the sand.
