= Simpson Desert, South Australia =

Simpson Desert
- Suburb
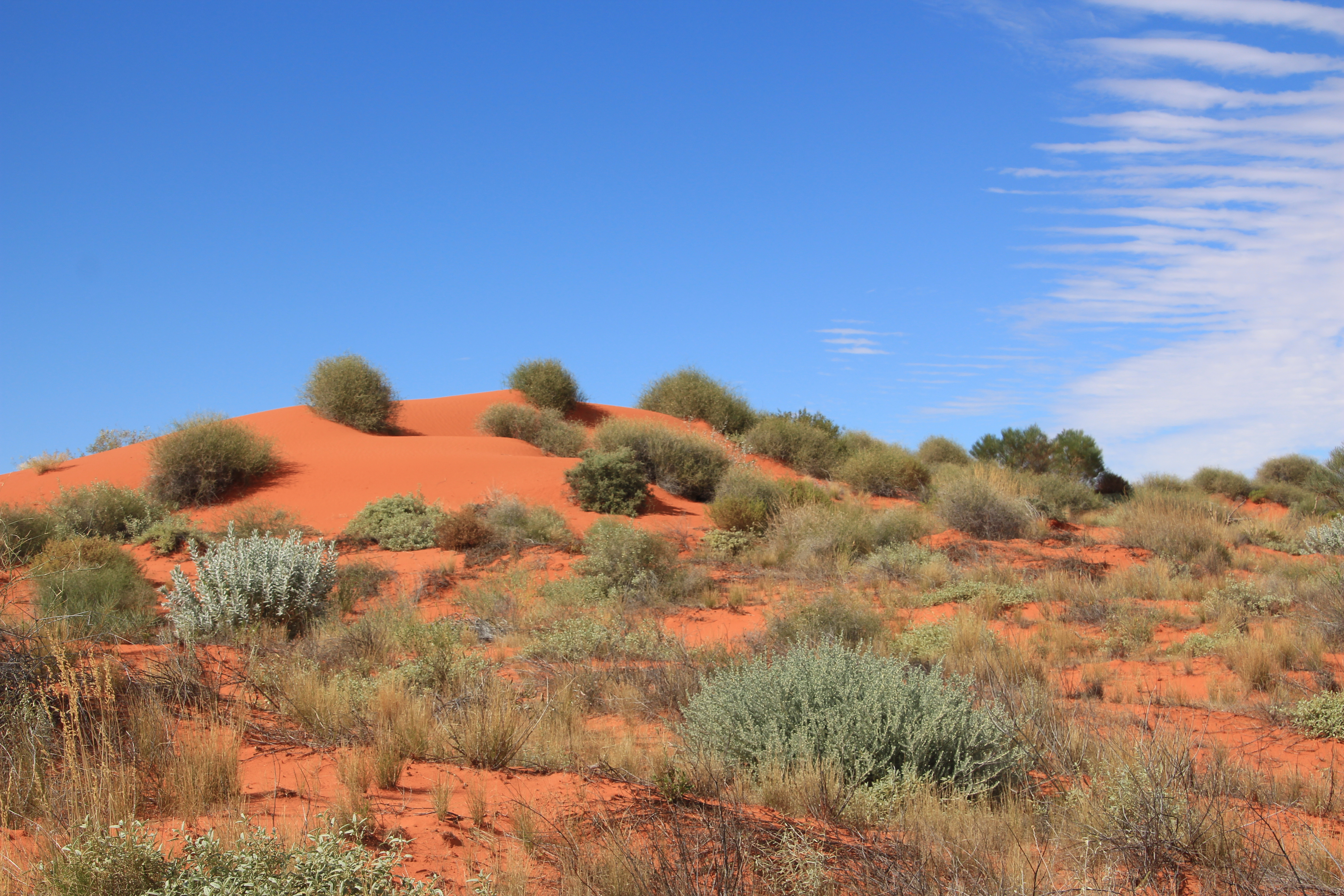
- Sand dune in the western section of the Simpson Desert

- Coordinates: 26.68°S 137.43°E
- Country: Australia
- State: South Australia
- Region: Far North
- LGA: Pastoral Unincorporated Area
- Location: 920 km (570 mi) north of Adelaide
- Established: 2013

Government
  - State electorate: Stuart
  - Federal division: Grey

Population
  - Total: no data available (2016 census)
- Time zone: UTC+9:30 (ACST)
  - Summer (DST): UTC+10:30 (ACST)
- Postcode: 5734
- Mean max temp: 31.5 °C (88.7 °F)
- Mean min temp: 16.8 °C (62.2 °F)
- Annual rainfall: 128.8 mm (5.07 in)
Suburbs around Simpson Desert
Northern Territory	Northern Territory	Northern Territory
Witjira; Macumba	Simpson Desert	Alton Downs Station; Clifton Hills Station; Cowarie
Macumba	Macumba; Kalamurina	Cowarie
- Location; Coordinates; Climate; Adjoining localities

Simpson Desert is a locality in the Australian state of South Australia located about 920 kilometres (570 miles) north of the capital city of Adelaide and which is located within the desert of the same name.

The locality was established on 26 April 2013 in respect to "the long established local name" which is derived from the desert of the same name.

The principal land use within the locality is conservation, with the full extent of the locality being occupied by the Munga-Thirri–Simpson Desert National Park, which was proclaimed on 26 November 2021 and includes the former protected areas of the Munga-Thirri–Simpson Desert Conservation Park and the Munga-Thirri–Simpson Desert Regional Reserve.

Simpson Desert is located within the federal division of Grey, the state electoral district of Stuart, the Pastoral Unincorporated Area of South Australia and the state's Far North region.
