= Wanggamala =

Aboriginal Australian people of the Northern Territory and Queensland

The Wanggamala people, also spelt Wangkamahdla, Wangkamadla, Wangkamanha, Wangkamana, Wonkamala, Wongkamala, Wonkamudla, and other variants, are an Aboriginal Australian people of the Northern Territory and Queensland.

== Country ==
In Norman Tindale's estimate, Wanggamala tribal lands covered some 20,000 square miles (52,000 km^{2}) of territory. They roamed north-west of Annandale, at Kalidawarry and around the lower Field and Hay rivers, along the Plenty river, and on the eastern margins of the Simpson Desert. River waters were ephemeral and they dug native wells (mikari).

In July 2021, the Wanggamala people, spelt Wangkamahdla in the claim, won native title rights to over 3,000,000 ha (7,400,000 acres) west and south-west of Boulia, stretching from around Bedourie, Queensland, across to the Northern Territory border, including Cravens Peak Reserve (named Pilungah Reserve in October 2021) and part of the Munga-Thirri National Park.

== Language ==
Their language was Wanggamala, which is now extinct.

== Economy ==
The Wanggamala lived in areas where the native tobacco pituri grows and, aside from using it themselves, they employed it as a valuable trading resource.

== Alternative names ==
- Tharlimanha (Breen 2007)
- Wanggamala (AIATSIS and Ethnologue)
- Wanggamanha
- Wangkamadla
- Wangkamahdla
- Wangkamala
- Wangkamana (Horton, after Tindale; Blake & Breen 1971)
- Wangkamanha
- Wonggaman (AIAS)
- Wonggawan
- Wongkamala (Tindale)
- Wonkamala (Tindale 1974)
- Wonkamudla (Tindale 1974; O'Grady et al 1996; Mathews)

== Sources ==
- Horton, David R. (1996). "Map of Indigenous Australia". AIATSIS.
- Howitt, Alfred William (1904). The native tribes of south-east Australia (PDF). Macmillan.
- Howitt, Alfred William; Siebert, Otto (January–June 1904). "Legends of the Dieri and Kindred Tribes of Central Australia". Journal of the Anthropological Institute of Great Britain and Ireland. 34. Adelaide: 100–129. doi:10.2307/2843089. JSTOR 2843089.
- Mathews, R. H. (January 1900a). "Divisions of the South Australian Aborigines". Proceedings of the American Philosophical Society. 39 (161): 78–91+93. JSTOR 983545.
- Mathews, R. H. (October–December 1900b). "Phallic Rites and Initiation Ceremonies of the South Australian Aborigines". Proceedings of the American Philosophical Society. 39 (164): 622–638. JSTOR 983778.
- Tindale, Norman Barnett (1974). "Wongkamala (NT)". Aboriginal Tribes of Australia: Their Terrain, Environmental Controls, Distribution, Limits, and Proper Names. Australian National University Press. ISBN 978-0-708-10741-6.
