= Malkumba-Coongie Lakes National Park =

National park in Australia

- IUCN category II (national park)
- Location within South Australia
- Location: South Australia
- Nearest city: Innamincka
- Coordinates: 27°15′41″S 140°9′25″E
- Area: 266.69 km^{2} (102.97 sq mi)
- Established: 31 March 2005
- Governing body: Department for Environment and Water (South Australia), Yandruwandha Yawarrawarrka Parks Advisory Committee, South Australian Arid Lands Natural Resources Management Board.
- Website: Official website

Malkumba-Coongie Lakes National Park is a protected area located in the north-east of South Australia about 110 kilometres (68 miles) north-west of Innamincka.

The national park was proclaimed on 31 March 2005 as the Coongie Lakes National Park under National Parks and Wildlife Act 1972 over a parcel of land previously part of the Innamincka Regional Reserve to "conserve significant wetlands, provide experiences for visitors and ensure that the core component of the Coongie Lakes system was protected". The national park is located on land that was included on the List of Wetlands of International Importance under the Ramsar Convention under the name, Coongie Lakes in 1987.

In 2014, it was renamed as the Malkumba-Coongie Lakes National Park. The national park is co-managed by the Department of Environment and Water, the Yandruwandha Yawarrawarrka Parks Advisory Committee and South Australian Arid Lands Natural Resources Management Board.

It is classified as an IUCN Category II protected area.
