= Strzelecki Regional Reserve =

Protected area in South Australia

- IUCN category VI (protected area with sustainable use of natural resources)
- Location within South Australia
- Location: South Australia
- Nearest city: Marree
- Coordinates: 28°53′01″S 139°48′10″E
- Area: 8,104.26 km^{2} (3,129.07 sq mi)
- Established: 19 December 1991
- Governing body: Department for Environment and Water

Strzelecki Regional Reserve is a protected area located in the Australian state of South Australia in the gazetted localities of Lindon and Strzelecki Desert about 493 kilometres (306 miles) north-east of Port Augusta. It includes the Strzelecki Desert and the dry Strzelecki Creek bed. The regional reserve can only be accessed via the historic Strzelecki Track. It is partly located on land that was included on the List of Wetlands of International Importance under the Ramsar Convention under the name Coongie Lakes in 1987. The regional reserve is classified as an IUCN Category VI protected area.

== See also ==
- Protected areas of South Australia
- Regional reserves of South Australia
- Strzelecki Desert Lakes Important Bird Area
