= Coongie Lakes =

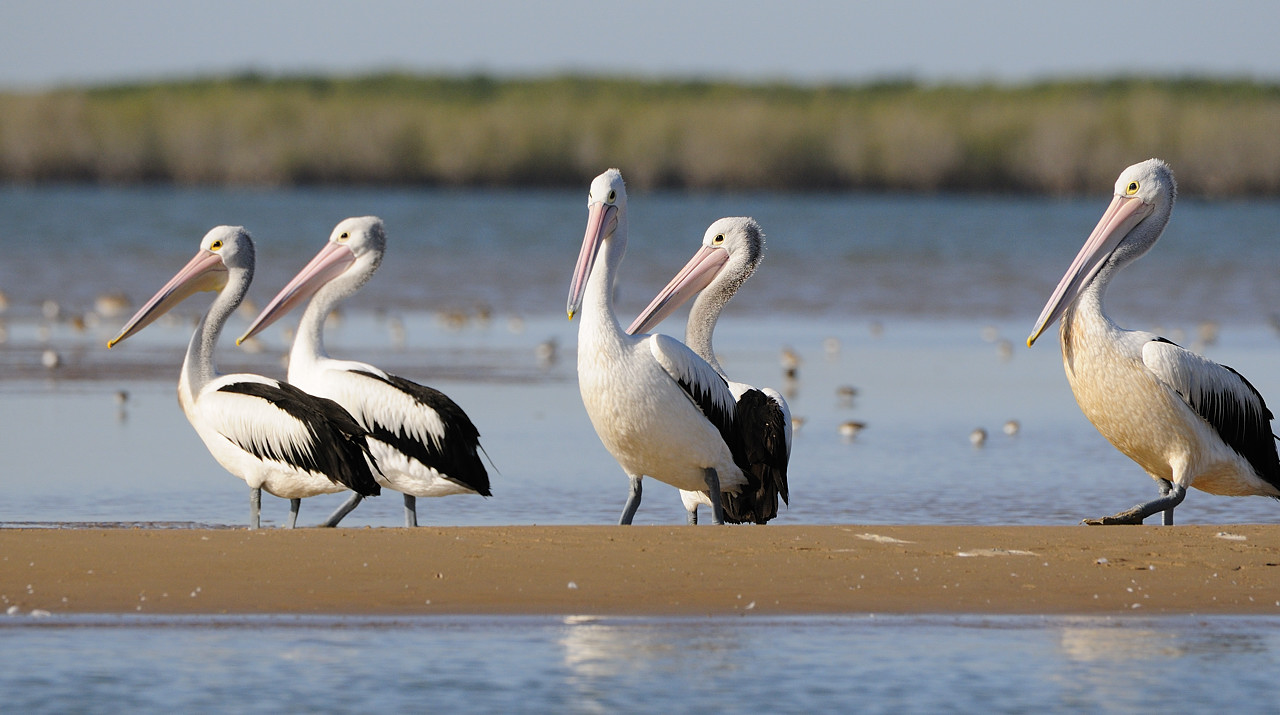
- Up to 100,000 Australian Pelicans have been recorded at Coongie Lakes

- Location in South Australia
- Location: Far North, South Australia
- Coordinates: 27°15′41″S 140°09′25″E
- Type: Salt lake
- Basin countries: Australia
- Managing agency: Department of Environment, Water and Natural Resources
- Designation: Ramsar Site
- Surface area: 21,790 km^{2} (8,410 sq mi)

Ramsar Wetland
- Designated: 15 June 1987
- Reference no.: 376

The Coongie Lakes is a freshwater wetland system in the Far North region of South Australia. The 21,790-square-kilometre (8,410 sq mi) lakes system is approximately 1,046 kilometres (650 miles) north of the Adelaide city centre. The wetlands includes lakes, channels, billabongs, shallow floodplains, deltas, and interdune swamps. It lies on the floodplain of Cooper Creek, an ephemeral river flowing through a desert landscape in the Lake Eyre Basin which rarely, after occasional large floods, empties into Lake Eyre. The wetland system has been recognised both as being of international importance by designation under the Ramsar Convention with a listing on 15 June 1987 and being nationally important within Australia with a listing in A Directory of Important Wetlands in Australia (DIWA). Its extent includes the regional town of Innamincka, the Malkumba-Coongie Lakes National Park, the Innamincka Regional Reserve, the Strzelecki Regional Reserve and the Coongie Lakes Important Bird Area.

== Description ==
The Coongie Lakes is located in the north-east corner of South Australia about 1,046 kilometres (650 miles) north of the Adelaide city centre. For management purposes, the wetland system has been given a boundary which is triangular in shape. The northern apex of the triangle is near Lake Moorayepe, the south western apex is near Marion Hill in the south and the eastern apex coincides with the South Australia-Queensland border to the immediate east of the town of Innamincka. The area of land within the boundary is reported as being 21,790 square kilometres (8,410 sq mi).

Land tenure is a mix of crown land, pastoral lease and protected area. The surrounding region is arid and has a very low human population density; it is used mainly for cattle grazing, as well as for oil and gas production, and is becoming increasingly important for tourism. Some of the wetlands fill only on rare occasions; some contain water for a short time after periodic flooding, while others are permanent or almost permanent. It lies within the traditional lands of the Yandruwandha, Yawarrawarrka, Ngamini and Dieri people.

== Flora and fauna ==
The banks and the periodically flooded areas of Cooper Creek and Coongie Lakes wetland system are vegetated by river red gums and coolibahs, often with a dense understorey of lignum thickets. The adjacent gibber plains are sparsely covered with Mitchell grass, while the dune country has species of Dodonaea, sandhill wattle and sandhill canegrass.

Major floods, generally originating in heavy rainfall in western Queensland, initiate a period of rapid, opportunistic plant growth and an influx of wildlife, especially of large numbers of waterbirds such as ducks, cormorants, pelicans, ibises, spoonbills, herons and waders that aggregate to feed and breed before dispersing as the waters recede.

Mammals present in the area include red kangaroos, dingos and, in the wetlands, rakali. There are also a variety of frogs and reptiles, including the inland taipan.

== Protected area status ==
=== Australian government ===
The wetland system has recognition both internationally under the Ramsar Convention and within Australia with an identical listing in "A Directory of Important Wetlands in Australia" (DIWA). It was listed on 15 June 1987 as Ramsar site 376 while it was listed in DIWA prior to 1995. While the Ramsar convention is a treaty obligation of the Australian government, jurisdiction for the management of the wetland system lies with the South Australian government agency, the Department of Environment, Water and Natural Resources.

=== South Australian government ===
The following protected areas proclaimed under the National Parks and Wildlife Act 1972 (SA) exist either wholly or partially within the extent of the wetland system: the Innamincka Regional Reserve, the Malkumba-Coongie Lakes National Park and the Strzelecki Regional Reserve.

=== Non-statutory arrangements ===
==== Coongie Lakes Important Bird Area ====
An area of 593.2 square kilometres (229.0 square miles) located at the northern of the wetland system and that is specifically associated with a number of water bodies has been identified as an important bird area by Birdlife International because it supports “more than 1% of the world populations of 12 species of waterbird and shorebird” as well as “populations of the vulnerable Australian painted snipe, the near threatened blue-billed duck, the restricted-range Eyrean grasswren and five species restricted to the arid biome.”

== See also ==
- List of lakes of Australia § South Australia
- Protected areas of South Australia
