= Eduction (geology) =

Sideways spreading in the Earth's crust

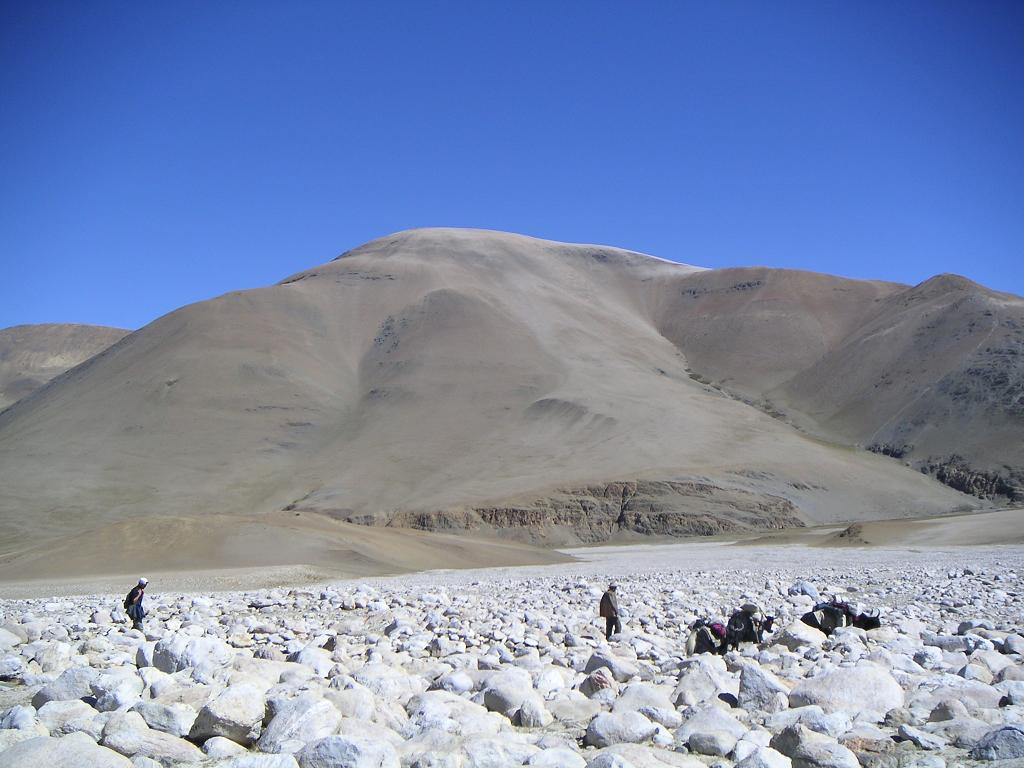
Tibetan rocky land, likely a result of combined eduction and erosion.

In geology, eduction is a process in which the Earth's crust spreads sideways, exposing deep-seated rocks. It is prominent in the middle layers of the Himalayas, where gravity pushes the mountains down. Together with a high grade of erosion, this activity brings deep rocks to the surface, many from more than a depth of 100 km. The unusually fast elevation preserves rare metastable minerals, e.g. diamonds and coesite.

== See also ==
- Desert pavement, describing other forms of surface rock formation.
