= Simpson Desert Important Bird Area =

Important Bird Area in Queensland, Australia

Coordinates: 25°00′02″S 138°11′23″E

Location of the Simpson Desert Important Bird Area in Australia

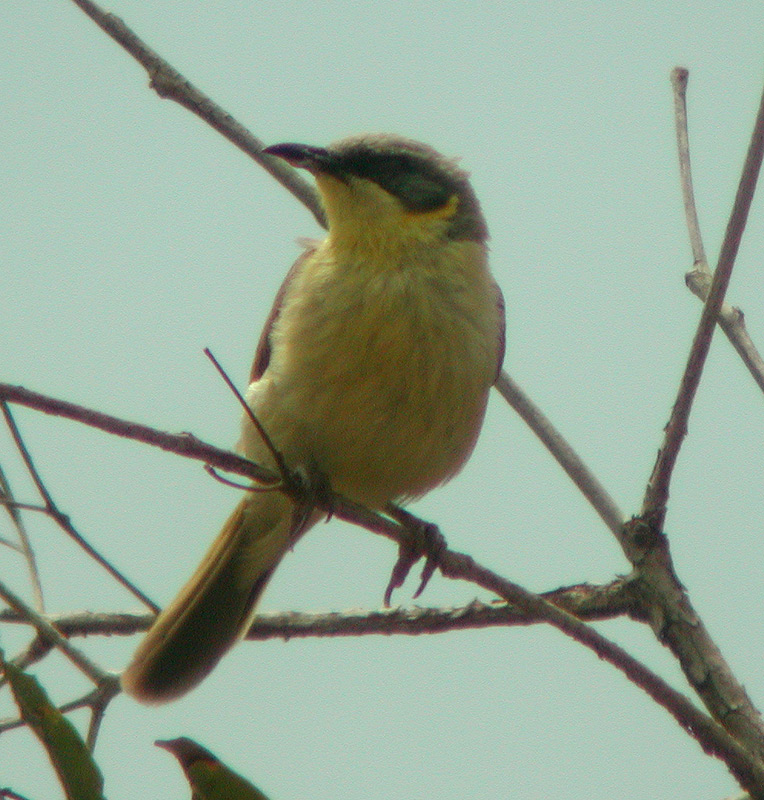
The IBA contains good populations of grey-headed...

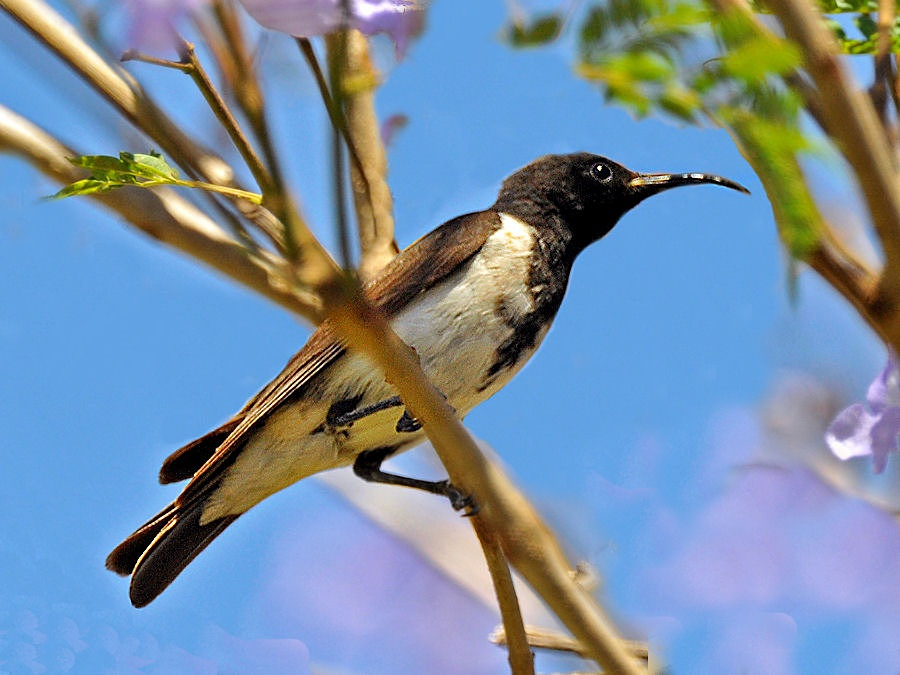
...and black honeyeaters

The Simpson Desert Important Bird Area comprises some 22,848 km^{2} of land within the Simpson Desert in south-western Queensland and north-eastern South Australia. It consists of five large contiguous reserves subject to little grazing pressure and good habitat management that are either known, or likely, to provide suitable habitat for Eyrean grasswrens.

== Description ==
The extent of IBA overlaps land including the following protected areas and privately held reserves: the Munga-Thirri–Simpson Desert National Park in South Australia; the Munga-Thirri National Park in Queensland; the Bush Heritage reserves of Ethabuka and Cravens Peak; and the North Australian Pastoral Company-managed Mulligan River Nature Refuge in Queensland.

The site contains parts of the spasmodically flooded Channel Country, intergrading into gidgee woodlands and tall shrubland communities. Other landforms include mesas, escarpments, gorges, gibber plains, dunefields, ephemeral clay pans, semi-permanent waterholes, and artesian springs. The climate is hot and arid; in the south of the site, temperatures may exceed 50 °C in summer with average annual rainfall less than 150 mm.

== Criteria for nomination as an IBA ==
The Important Bird Area (IBA) has been identified as such by BirdLife International because it supports a large population of Eyrean grasswrens as well as small numbers of plains-wanderers. It also contains good numbers of grey falcons, Australian bustards, inland dotterels, banded whitefaces, grey-headed, grey, black and pied honeyeaters, gibberbirds, chirruping and chiming wedgebills, cinnamon quail-thrushes and painted finches.

== See also ==
- List of birds of South Australia
