= Innamincka Regional Reserve =

Protected area in South Australia

- IUCN category VI (protected area with sustainable use of natural resources)
- Location within South Australia
- Location: South Australia
- Nearest city: Innamincka
- Coordinates: 27°32′28″S 140°35′47″E
- Area: 13,540.54 km^{2} (5,228.03 sq mi)
- Established: 22 December 1988
- Governing body: Department for Environment and Water
- Website: Official website

Innamincka Regional Reserve is a protected area located in the north-east of South Australia which includes the town of Innamincka. The regional reserve was proclaimed on 22 December 1988 under National Parks and Wildlife Act 1972 over a parcel of land previously part of the Innamincka Pastoral Lease to recognise it as "a place of major conservation importance" whilst permitting ongoing mining and agricultural activity. It was the first "multiple use reserve to be administered by a nature conservation agency" to be declared in South Australia under the category of regional reserve provided for in the National Parks and Wildlife Act 1972. It is partly located on land that was included on the List of Wetlands of International Importance under the Ramsar Convention under the name Coongie Lakes in 1987. In 2005, a parcel of land was excised from the regional reserve to create the national park now known as Malkumba-Coongie Lakes National Park. It also includes the Innamincka/Cooper Creek state heritage area. The regional reserve is classified as an IUCN Category VI protected area.

== See also ==
- Protected areas of South Australia
- Regional reserves of South Australia
