= Munga-Thirri–Simpson Desert Regional Reserve =

Former protected area in South Australia

- IUCN category VI (protected area with sustainable use of natural resources)
- Location within South Australia
- Location: South Australia
- Nearest city: Oodnadatta
- Coordinates: 26°48′17″S 137°24′37″E
- Area: 29,239.53 km^{2} (11,289.45 sq mi)
- Established: 24 October 1985
- Governing body: Department for Environment and Water
- Website: Official website

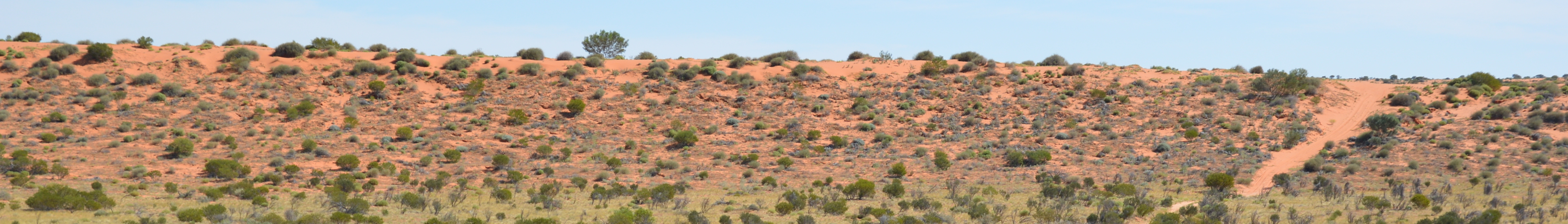

The Munga-Thirri–Simpson Desert Regional Reserve (formerly Simpson Desert Regional Reserve) was a protected area located in the Australian state of South Australia within the gazetted locality of Simpson Desert. The regional reserve's name was altered on 2 August 2018 by the Government of South Australia. The regional reserve was classified as an IUCN Category VI protected area.

As of November 2021 it was merged with the Munga-Thirri—Simpson Desert Conservation Park to create the Munga-Thirri–Simpson Desert National Park.

== See also ==
- Protected areas of South Australia
- Regional reserves of South Australia
- Regional Reserve (Australia)
- Simpson Desert
- Simpson Desert Important Bird Area
- Munga-Thirri National Park, Queensland
