= Lake Frome National Park =

Protected area in South Australia

- IUCN category VI (protected area with sustainable use of natural resources)
- Location within South Australia
- Location: South Australia
- Nearest city: Hawker
- Coordinates: 30°43′51.85″S 139°48′39.46″E
- Area: 2,582.40 km^{2} (997.07 sq mi)
- Established: 19 December 1991
- Governing body: Department for Environment and Water

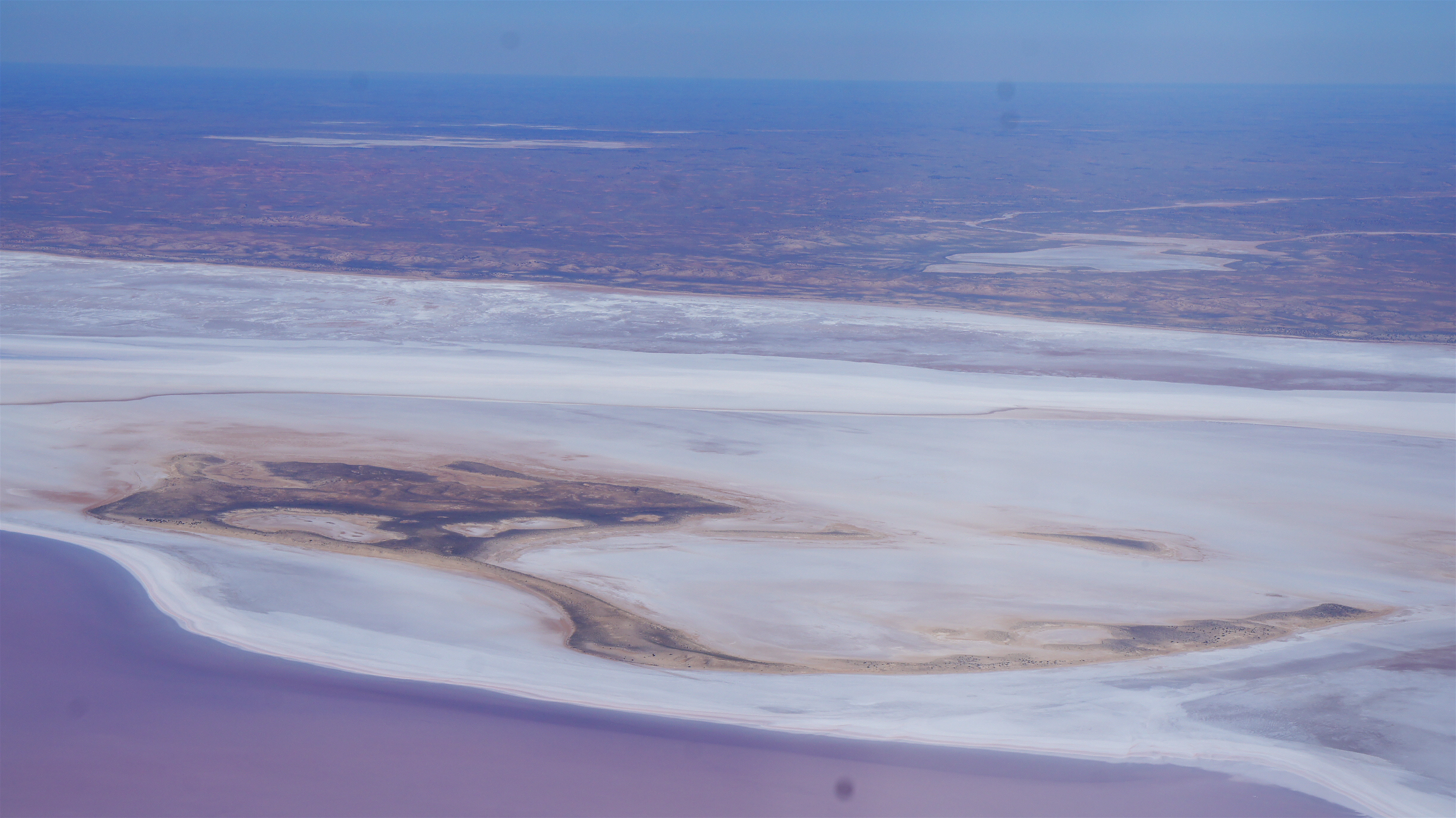
Shows the salt lake.

Lake Frome National Park, formerly Lake Frome Regional Reserve, is a protected area located in the Australian state of South Australia about 750 kilometres (470 miles) north-east of the state capital of Adelaide, in the Northern Flinders Ranges. It covers the full extent of Lake Frome, an endorheic and ephemeral salt lake. It has an area of 2,582.40 square kilometres (997.07 sq mi).

== History ==
Lake Frome Regional Reserve was proclaimed as a Regional Reserve on 19 December 1991 for the following purposes and uses:

…to extend the conservation management of the adjoining Vulkathunha-Gammon Ranges National Park. It conserves a large arid salt lake system that is of regional geological significance. The dominant land use of the reserve is biological and cultural conservation.

On 26 November 2021, the reserve's status was upgraded to a national park in recognition of its significance as a large salt lake, giving it the same status as other large salt lakes such as Kati Thanda-Lake Eyre, Lake Torrens and Lake Gairdner.

== Location and description ==
The park lies around 750 kilometres (470 miles) north-east of Adelaide, in the Northern Flinders Ranges, and includes the whole of Lake Frome, an endorheic salt lake. It has an area of 2,582.40 square kilometres (997.07 sq mi). As an ephemeral a salt lake system, it is representative of very rare and little-known environments, and therefore considered to be of national significance.

Since 2013, it has been located within the boundaries of the gazetted locality of Lake Frome.

== Classification ==
The regional reserve was classified as an IUCN Category VI protected area.

== See also ==
- Protected areas of South Australia
