= Strzelecki Desert =

Desert in central Australia

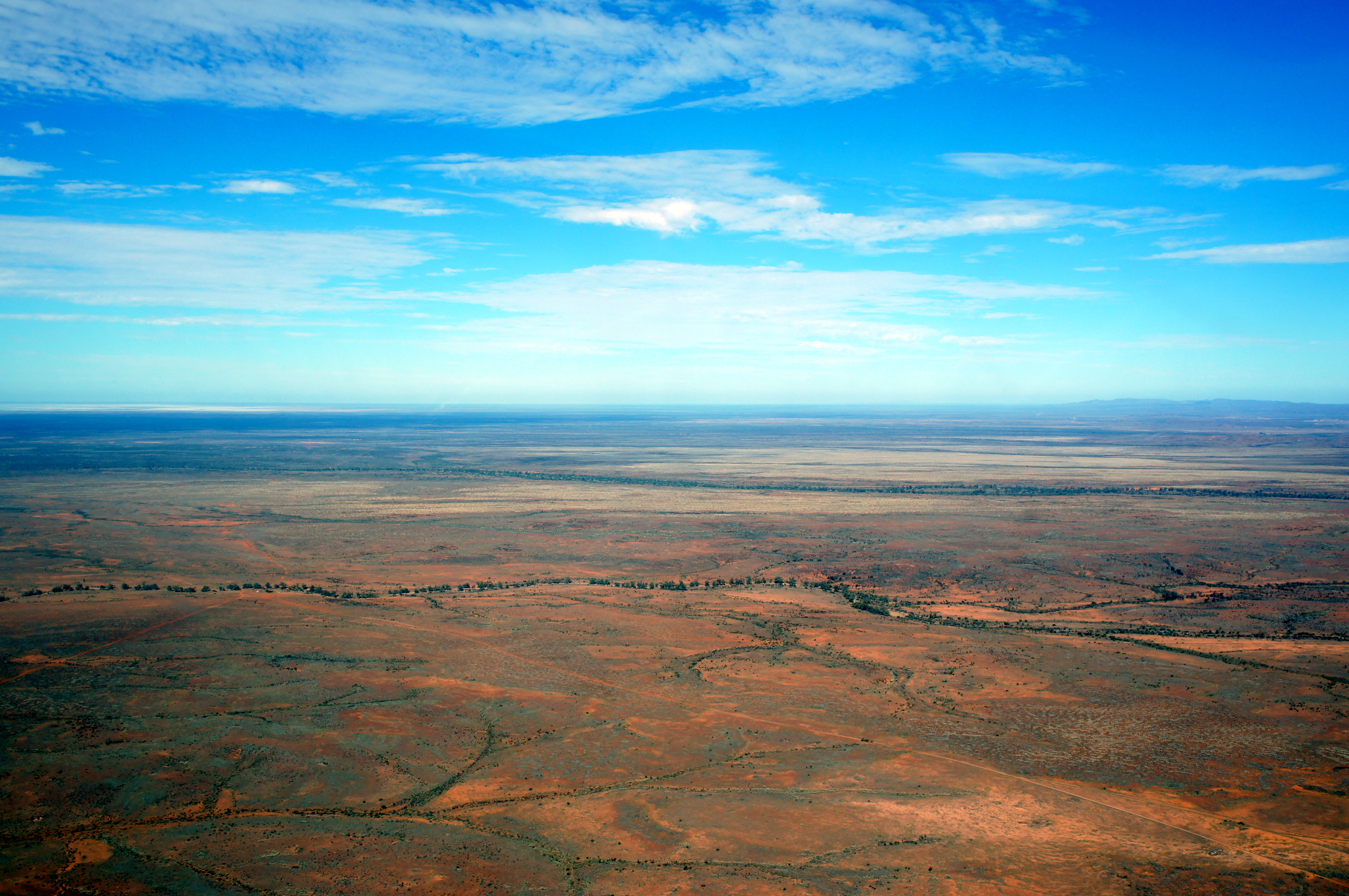
- Strzelecki Desert, South Australia.

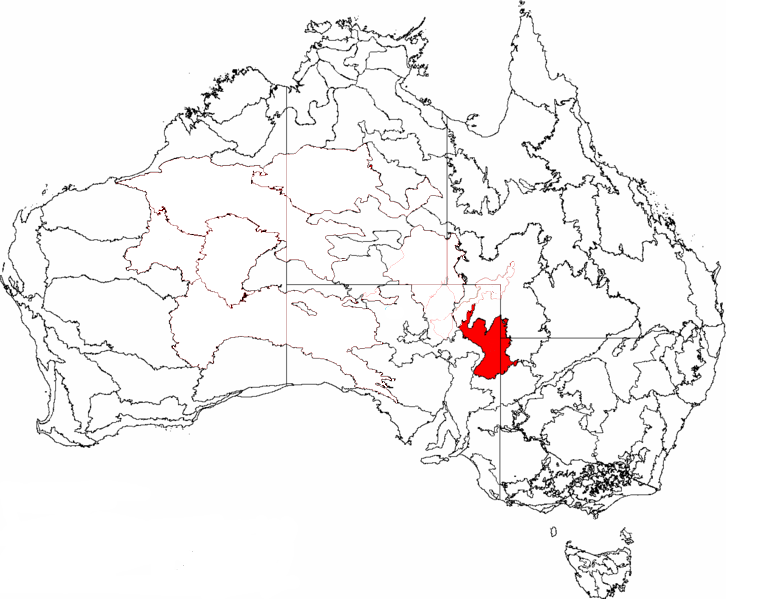
- Area: 80,250 km^{2} (30,980 mi^{2})

Geography
- Country: Australia
- States: South Australia; New South Wales; Queensland
- Coordinates: 27.69°S 140.41°E

The Strzelecki Desert (/strəˈzɛlɪki/ strə-ZEL-ih-kee; Polish: [stʂɛˈlɛt͡skʲi]) is located in the Far North Region of South Australia, South West Queensland and western New South Wales. It is positioned in the northeast of the Lake Eyre Basin, and north of the Flinders Ranges. Two other deserts occupy other parts of the Lake Eyre Basin: the Tirari Desert and the Simpson Desert.

== Name ==
Charles Sturt named the previously unexplored desert for the Polish explorer Paweł Edmund Strzelecki in 1845. The ill-fated Burke and Wills expedition of 1861 also passed through the region.

== Geography ==
The desert covers 80,250 km^{2} making it Australia's seventh largest desert. The Dingo Fence, Birdsville Track, the Strzelecki Track, the Diamantina River, Cooper Creek and the Strzelecki Creek all pass through the Desert. The desert is characterised by extensive dune fields and is home to three wilderness areas.

Much of the desert is preserved within the Strzelecki Regional Reserve in South Australia. Parts of the eastern sections of the desert are protected by the Sturt National Park in New South Wales. A population of the endangered Dusky Hopping Mouse lives in the desert.

== Access ==
The Cobbler Sandhills near Lake Blanche is a section of the Strzelecki Desert where the dunes are replaced by small eroded knolls, mostly with vegetation on the top. This area provided great difficulty for early attempts to cross the desert by car, and the name relates to the sheep which were the most difficult to shear, known as the "cobblers".

== See also ==
- Bore Track
- Deserts of Australia
- Strzelecki (disambiguation)
