= Munga-Thirri–Simpson Desert National Park =

National park in South Australia

- IUCN category Ia (strict nature reserve)
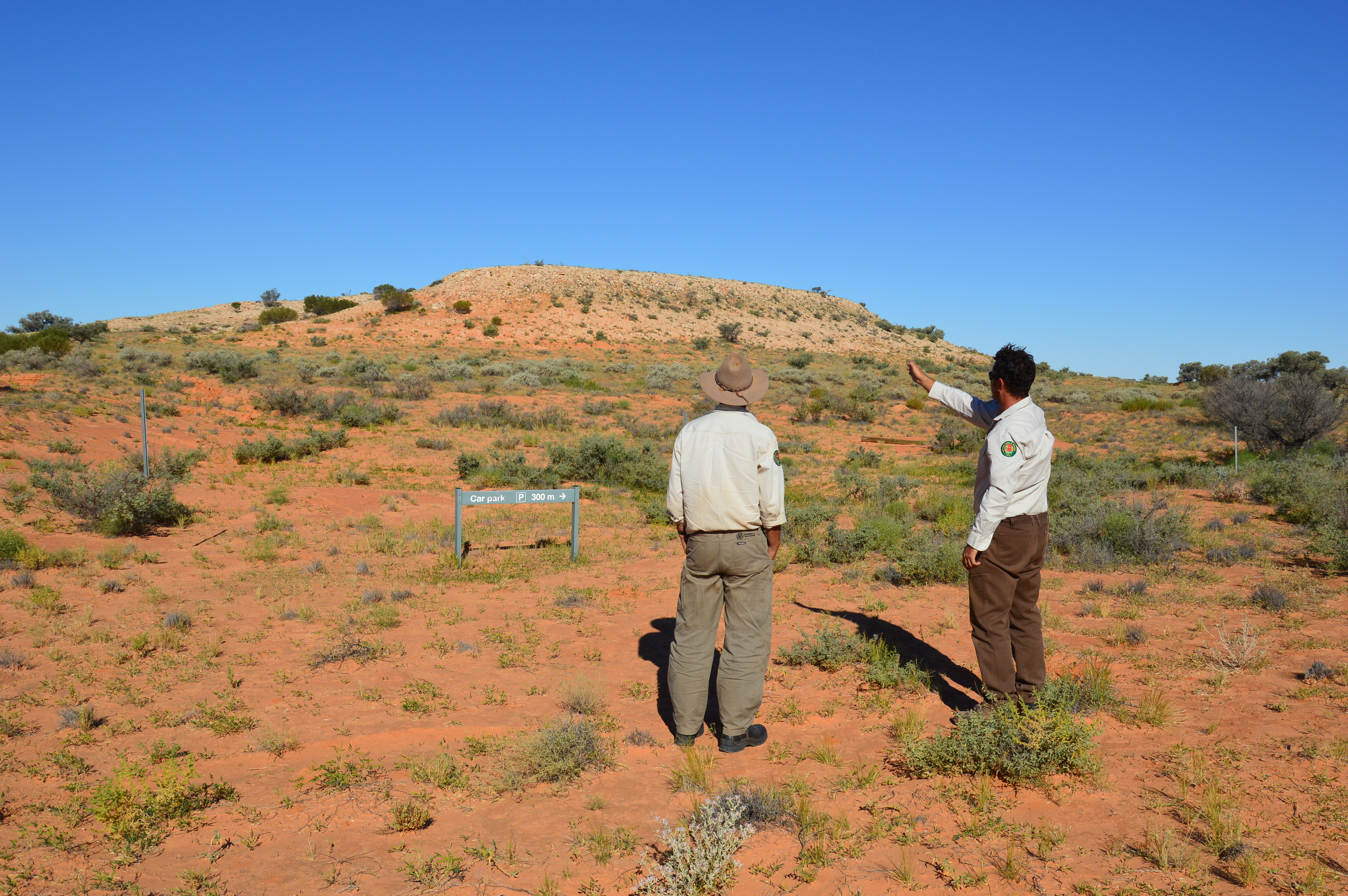
- Rangers looking at Approdinna Attora Knolls in the park

- Location within South Australia
- Location: South Australia
- Nearest city: Oodnadatta
- Coordinates: 26°14′46″S 137°52′23″E
- Area: 36,000 km^{2} (14,000 sq mi)
- Established: 14 December 1967
- Governing body: Department for Environment and Water
- Website: Official website

Munga-Thirri–Simpson Desert National Park, part of which was formerly Munga-Thirri–Simpson Desert Conservation Park, Simpson Desert Conservation Park, and Simpson Desert National Park, is a protected area located in the far north of the Australian state of South Australia, near its border with Queensland and the Northern Territory. As of November 2021 it is the largest national park in Australia, covering 3,600,000 ha (14,000 mi^{2}).

== Location ==
The park is about 970 kilometres (600 mi) north of the state capital of Adelaide and above 215 kilometres (134 mi) north-east of the town of Oodnadatta.

== History ==
The conservation park occupied land within the Simpson Desert in the gazetted locality of the same name. It was bounded by the borders of the Northern Territory and Queensland to its north and by the Munga-Thirri–Simpson Desert Regional Reserve to its west, south and east.

The land within the boundaries of the conservation park first obtained protected area status on 14 December 1967 as a national park proclaimed under the National Parks Act 1966 as the Simpson Desert National Park. On 27 April 1972, the national park was reconstituted as the Simpson Desert Conservation Park upon the proclamation of the National Parks and Wildlife Act 1972. As of 2018, it covered an area of 6,932.68 square kilometres (2,676.72 sq mi).

On 2 August 2018, the conservation park's name was altered by the Government of South Australia to Munga-Thirri–Simpson Desert Conservation Park.

In an unprecedented move, the park and the Simpson Desert Regional Reserve were closed to public access by the state government from 1 December 2008 to 15 March 2009 due to extreme heat during the Australian summer.

The conservation park was classified as an IUCN Category Ia protected area as of 2016 In 1980, it was listed on the now-defunct Register of the National Estate.

The conservation park, along with the Simpson Desert Regional Reserve and Witjira National Park, was described as a protected area representing one of the world's best examples of dunal desert. A wide variety of desert flora and fauna are protected in a landscape of varied dune systems, extensive playa lakes, spinifex grasslands and Acacia woodlands. These trees soak up water from underground water springs.

=== National park ===
A new national park was created by combining the Munga-Thirri–Simpson Desert Conservation Park with the Regional Reserve in November 2021, creating Australia's largest national park. At 3,600,000 ha (14,000 mi^{2}), it is double the size of Kakadu National Park, and four times the size of Yellowstone National Park in the US.

== See also ==
- Protected areas of South Australia
- Munga-Thirri National Park
- Simpson Desert Important Bird Area
