= Witjira National Park =

National park in South Australia

- IUCN category VI (protected area with sustainable use of natural resources)
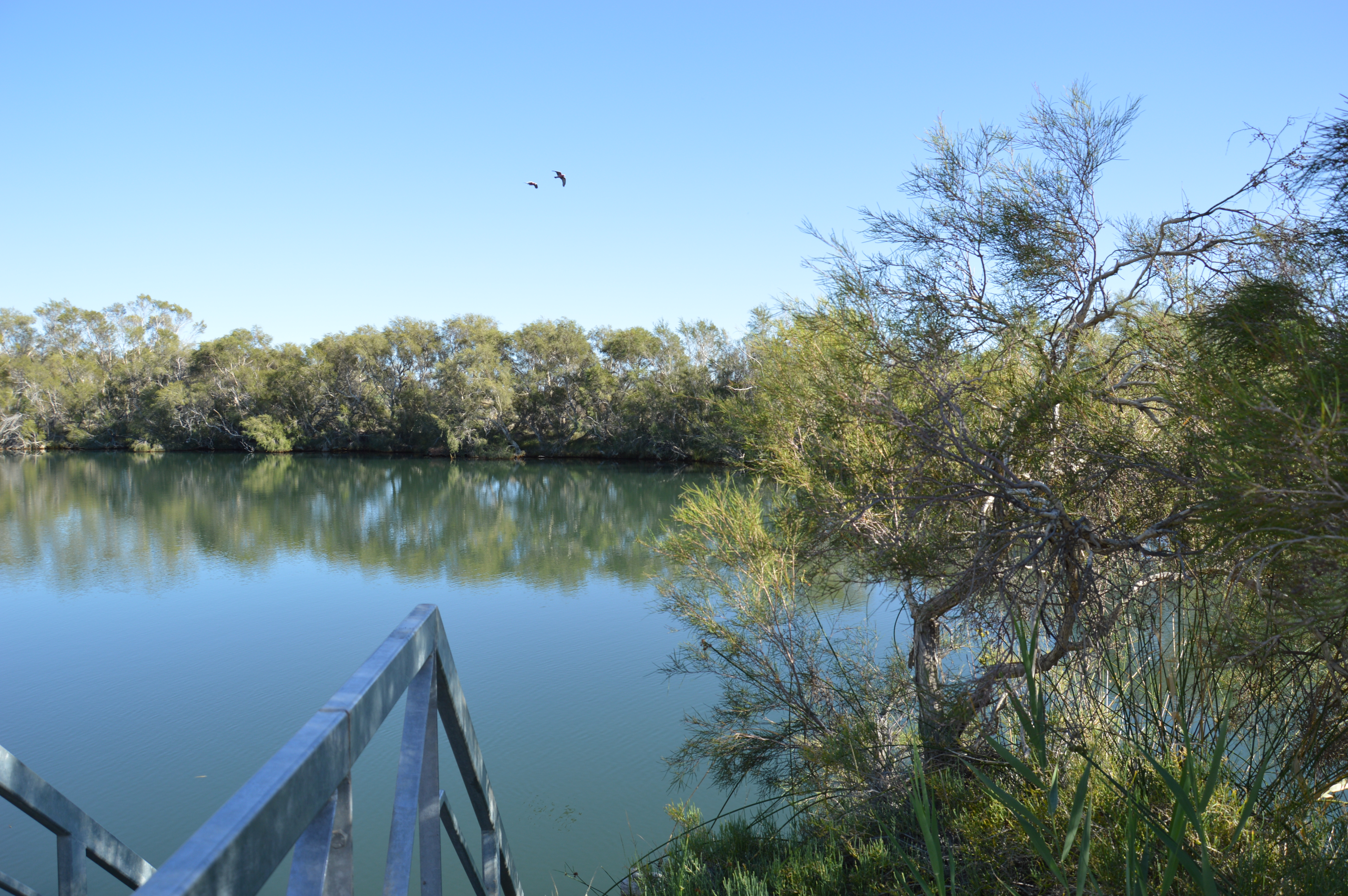
- Dalhousie Springs in Witjira National Park

- Location within South Australia
- Location: South Australia
- Nearest city: Finke
- Coordinates: 26°20′20″S 135°40′30″E
- Area: 7,726.73 km^{2} (2,983.31 sq mi)
- Established: 21 November 1985
- Visitors: 15,000 (in 2009)
- Governing body: Department for Environment and Water; Witjira Co-management Board
- Website: Official website

Witjira National Park is a protected area in the Australian state of South Australia about 987 kilometres (613 miles) north of the state capital of Adelaide.

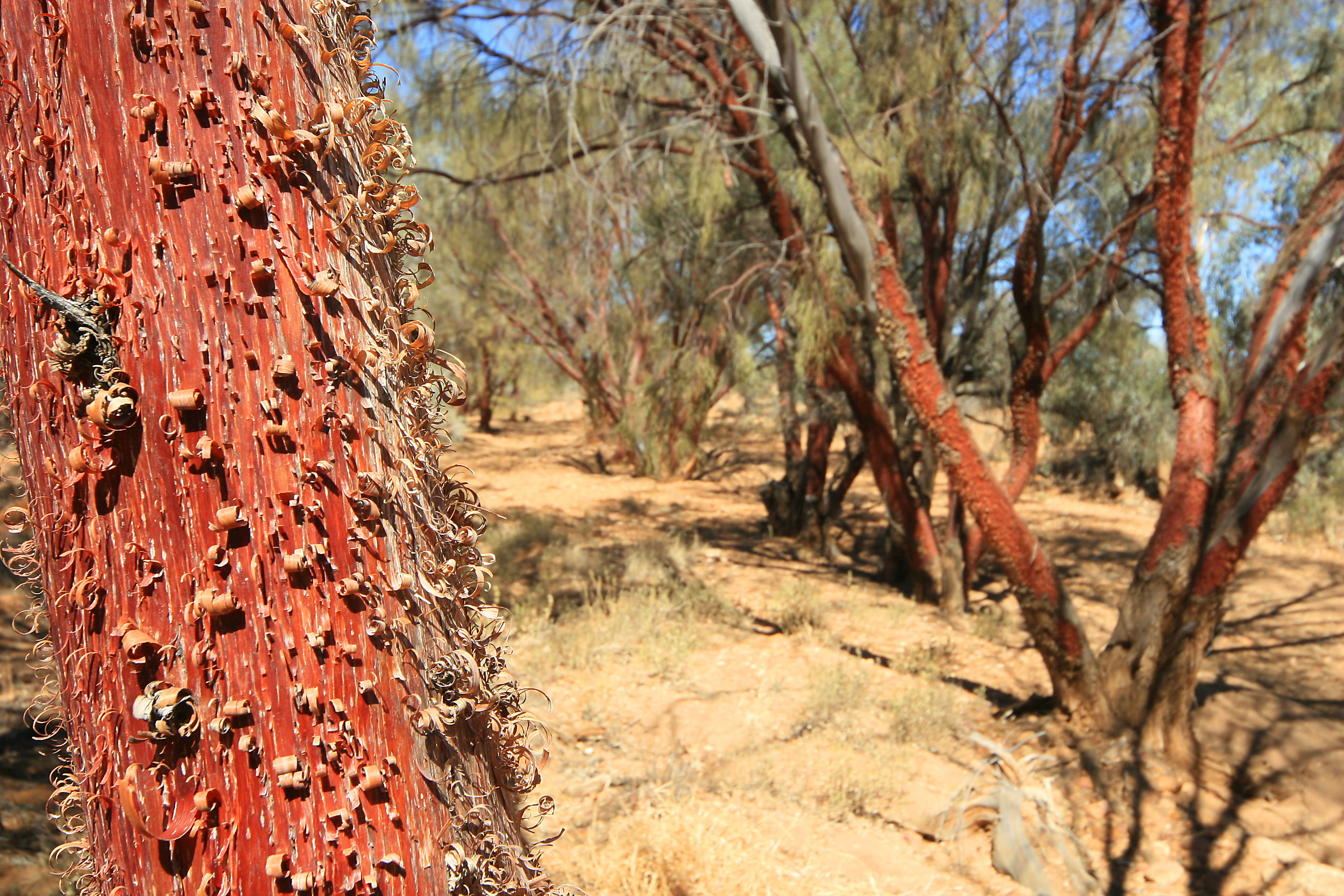
Acacia cyperophylla, growing along 3 O'Clock Creek in Witjira National Park

== History ==
The national park was proclaimed on 21 November 1985 to "protect Australia’s largest array of artesian springs: the nationally significant Dalhousie Mound Springs complex". In 2007, it became the first protected area in South Australia to have formal joint management arrangements between its traditional owners and the Government of South Australia.

The extent of land occupied by the national park was gazetted as a locality in April 2013 under the name "Witjira".

On 26 November 2021, the government changed the conditions of the park, to forever exclude mining in the Dalhousie Springs National Heritage Area.

== Description ==
As of 2018, it covered an area of 7,726.73 square kilometres (2,983.31 sq mi).

The national park is classified as an IUCN Category VI protected area. It was listed on the now-defunct Register of the National Estate during or after 1998.

The historic Dalhousie Homestead Ruins, from the former Dalhousie Station, lie within the national park and are listed on the South Australian Heritage Register.

== See also ==
- Protected areas of South Australia
