= Munga-Thirri National Park =

National park in Queensland, Australia

- IUCN category II (national park)
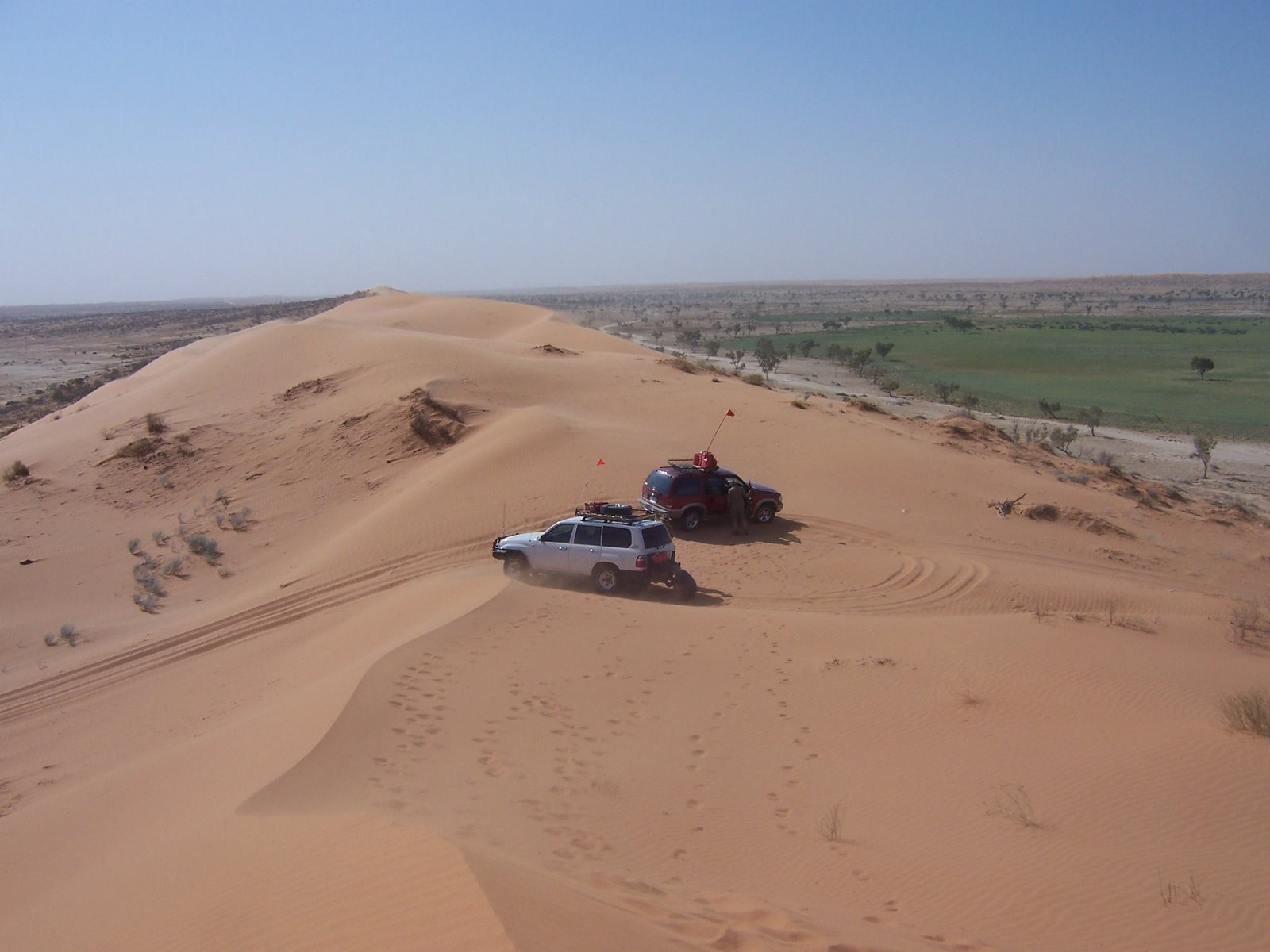
- 'Big Red' is the largest sand dune in the national park, 2007

- Location within Queensland
- Location: Queensland
- Nearest city: Birdsville
- Coordinates: 25°08′33″S 138°14′25″E
- Area: 10,120 km^{2} (3,910 sq mi)
- Established: 1967
- Governing body: Queensland Parks and Wildlife Service
- Website: Official website

Munga-Thirri National Park, formerly known as the Simpson Desert National Park, is the largest national park in Queensland, Australia, 1,495 km west of Brisbane. The park covers an area of 10,120 square kilometres (3,910 sq mi) in the Simpson Desert surrounding Poeppel Corner in the west of the locality of Birdsville in the Central West region of Queensland.

== Landforms ==
The main features of the park are large sand dunes which can be 50 m high and around 1 km apart. Most dunes are between 10 and 35 m in height. The longest sand ridge is 200 km in length. One of the most prominent dunes is called 'Big Red' and is located 35 km west of Birdsville. The dunes started to form 30,000 years ago. Also found in the park are salt lakes and claypans.

== Flora and fauna ==
The landscape supports up to 180 bird species. The park includes part of the Simpson Desert Important Bird Area, identified as such by BirdLife International because it contains habitat suitable for Eyrean grasswrens. Other animals which may be seen include the red kangaroo, dingo, geckos and the Australian feral camel. With the falling of any significant rains comes a transformation of dormant wildflowers.

== Tourism ==
Visitors are encouraged to visit from April to October to avoid extreme daytime temperatures and to travel within a two-vehicle party with long-distance communications equipment. A 4WD vehicle is needed to travel through the park. There are no roads in the park. The main track is called the QAA Line. Winter mornings can be freezing, while summer temperatures can be as hot as 50°. Camping is permitted within 500 m of the QAA Line. Vehicles are not permitted to leave the main track.

Park rangers who are based at Birdsville occasionally close the park when flooded rivers pose a risk to tourists. Increasing tourist numbers have been depleting wood supplies to the point that native fauna could be affected. This has led to authorities encouraging the use of gas camp stoves.

== History ==
Aboriginal peoples have lived in the region for generations. They survived in the dry conditions by digging soaks in the depressions between dunes, some of which were 7 metres (23 ft) deep.

David Lindsay was the first non-Aboriginal person to cross the central and southern areas of the Simpson Desert in 1886. In 1936 Ted Colson crossed the full length of the desert.

A national park in the desert was first suggested in 1965 by the National Parks Association of Queensland. The park was extended northwards in 1991. The expansion included arid lands with a more diverse range of vegetation.

As of July 2019, the Head Ranger of the park is Elder of the Wangkangurru people and traditional owner Don Rowlands, residing in Birdsville.

== See also ==
- Protected areas of Queensland
- Munga-Thirri—Simpson Desert Conservation Park
- Simpson Desert Important Bird Area
- Munga-Thirri–Simpson Desert Regional Reserve
