= Desert pavement =

Type of desert earth surface

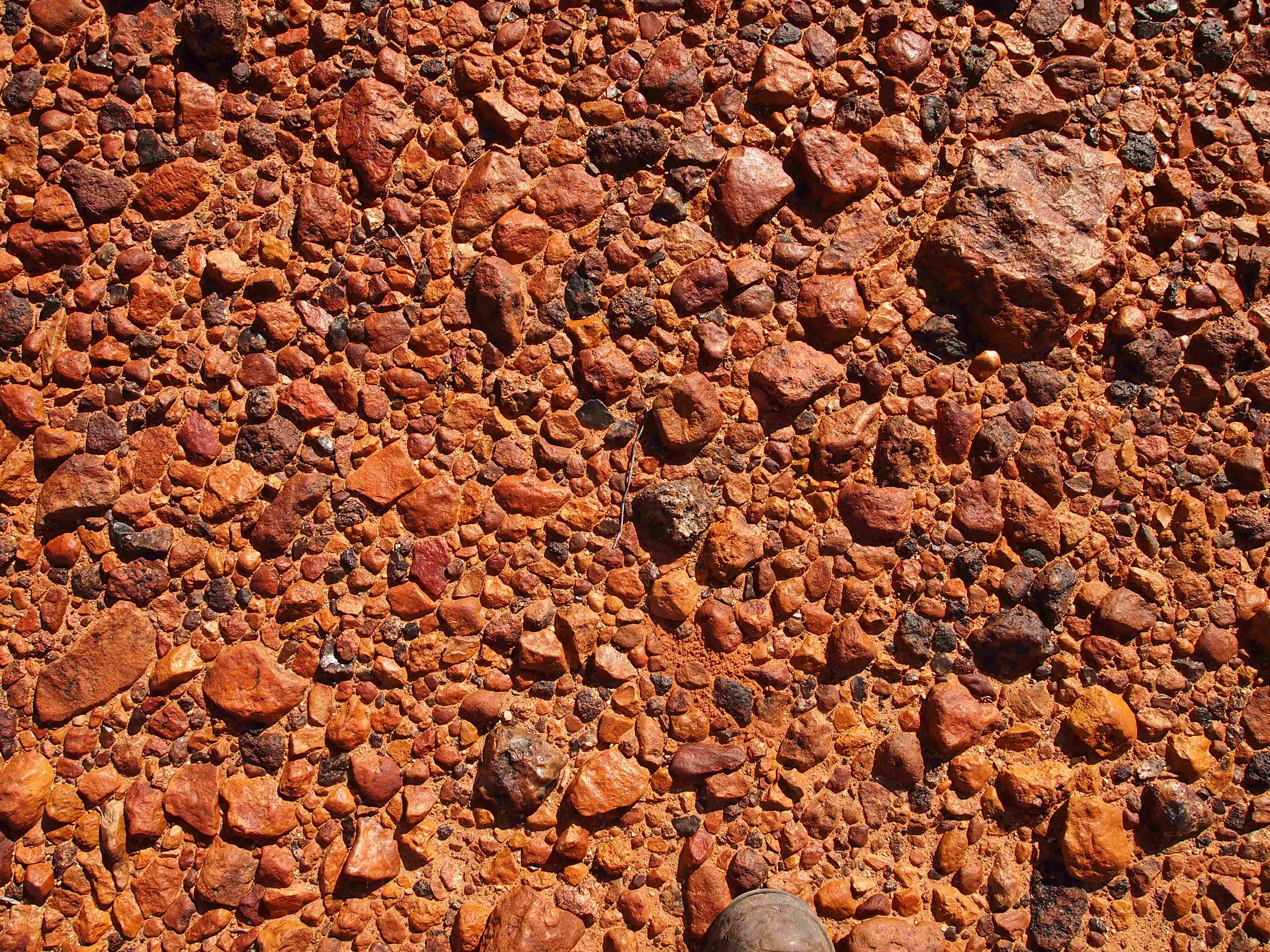
Desert pavement showing desert varnish on the pebbles; gibber plains of central Australia

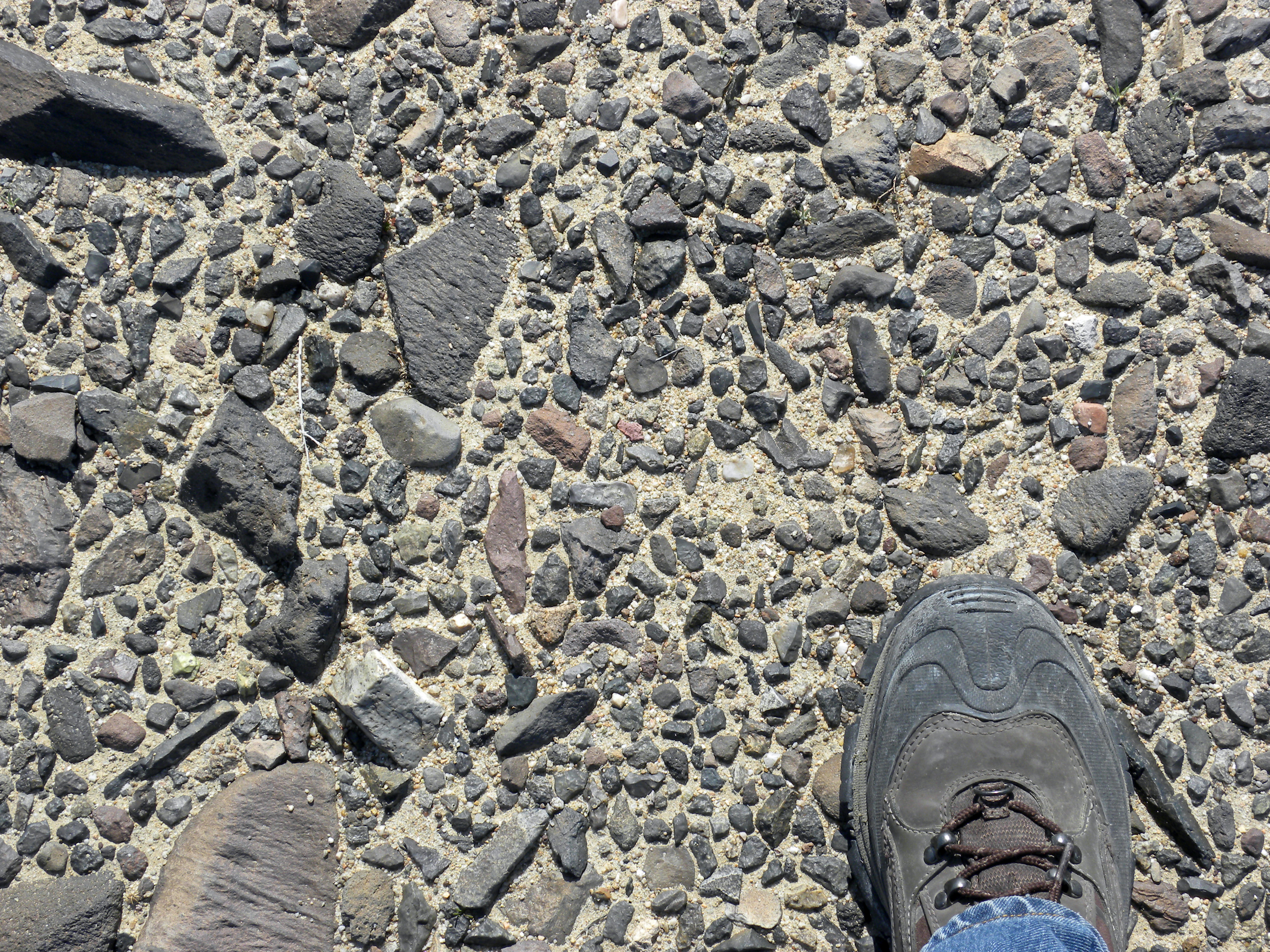
Desert pavement showing wind scour on the cobbles; Mojave Desert of southern California

A desert pavement, also called reg (in western Sahara), serir (in eastern Sahara), gibber (in Australia), hamada (western Sahara and Middle East), or saï (in central Asia) is a desert surface covered with closely packed, interlocking angular or rounded rock fragments of pebble and cobble size. They typically top alluvial fans. Desert varnish collects on the exposed surface rocks over time. The presence of desert pavement typically is used as an indicator for the aridity of an area and the relative age of geomorphic surfaces.

Geologists debate the mechanics of pavement formation and their age. Studies look at pavements on alluvial surfaces and show that older surfaces have more developed pavements with small, angular rocks that are well sorted and tightly packed together.

== Formation ==
Desert pavement formation can be attributed to deflation, the erosion of fine-grained material, or an upward migration of gravel. There are specific factors involved for the development of desert pavements, which include the necessity for low slope angles and dry conditions, alongside geomorphic and vegetative settings.

Several hypotheses have been proposed for the formation of desert pavements. A common hypothesis suggests that they form through the gradual removal of sand, dust and other fine-grained material by the wind and intermittent rain, leaving the larger fragments behind. The larger fragments are shaken into place through the forces of rain, running water, wind, gravity, creep, thermal expansion and contraction, wetting and drying, frost heaving, animal traffic, and the Earth's constant microseismic vibrations. The removal of small particles by wind does not continue indefinitely, because once the pavement forms, it acts as a barrier to resist further erosion. The small particles collect underneath the pavement surface, forming a vesicular A soil horizon (designated "Av").

A second hypothesis supposes that desert pavements form from the shrink/swell properties of the clay underneath the pavement; when precipitation is absorbed by clay it causes it to expand, and when it dries it cracks along planes of weakness. Over time, this geomorphic action transports small pebbles to the surface, where they stay through lack of precipitation that would otherwise destroy the pavement by transport of the clasts or excessive vegetative growth.

A newer hypothesis suggests that desert pavements form through deposition of windblown dust atop preexisting rocks. The dust then settles beneath the rocks, forming a layer of soil, while the rocks at the top crack and begin to merge into desert pavement. In 1995, researchers conducted a study in the Mojave Desert using helium-3 dating where they determined the rocks to be of older age than the soil beneath, leading to the conclusion of "stone pavements [being] born at the surface."

Aeolian processes play a key role in the evolution of desert pavements especially in arid environments. This process focuses on deposition, erosion, and transportation of sediments as a result of wind. Fine dust and sediment get deposited by the wind in-between surface rocks, which helps contribute soil formation under the pavement. This would ultimately tightly pack the stones together on the surface, contributing to the sustainability and long-term development of desert pavements. The continuous accumulation of dust allows for the pavement to be more mature and be resistant to disturbances, allowing for long-term stability.

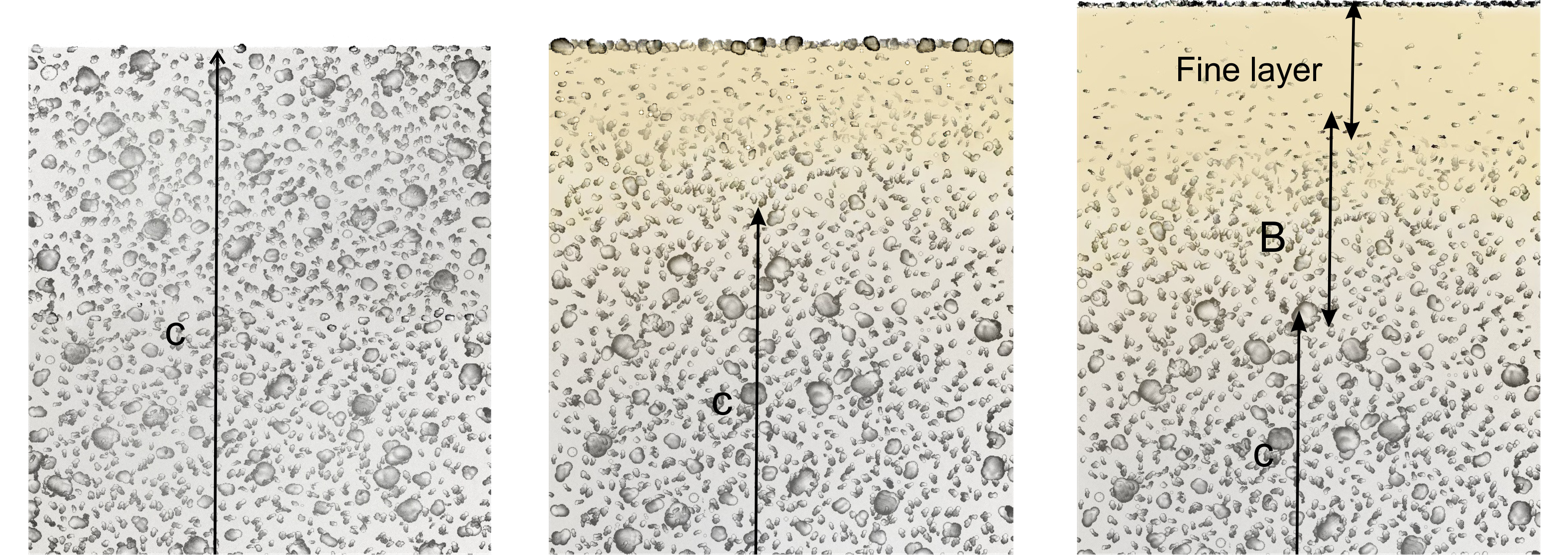
Desert pavement evolution

Desert pavement surfaces are often coated with desert varnish, a dark brown, sometimes shiny coating that contains clay minerals. In the US a famous example can be found on Newspaper Rock in southeastern Utah. Desert varnish is a thin coating (patina) of clays, iron, and manganese on the surface of sun-baked boulders. Micro-organisms may also play a role in their formation. Desert varnish is also prevalent in the Mojave desert and Great Basin geomorphic province.

== Salt water weathering impacts on desert pavements ==
The Lake Eyre basin located in Southern Australia, the most arid parts of Australia, plays a role in salt weathering of desert pavements. In Lake Eyre, research has shown that mechanical salt weathering is one of the fastest methods of erosion in an arid environment as a result of saline material through continuous fluctuating lake levels. The abundance and accumulation of salt helps in the formation of pavements. Salt crystals play a strong role in mechanical weathering by breaking down stones through forming in the cracks and splitting apart the stones into smaller fragments. Research shows seven stages of the salt weathering process on desert pavements. First, involves the exposure of upper boulders alongside the lake's shores that are then broken down through continuous heating and cool, forming cracks. Second, the upper surface of the boulder broken up into sharp fragments taking less than 500 years. Third, a majority of the stones are exposed, beginning soil development, taking about 500 years. Fourth, fragmented stones create a mini-hill with sandy soil, taking approximately 1500 years. Fifth, the sandy soil becomes silty with the stone hill being sharp in the center and round along the edges. This process is estimated to take about 1500 years or more. Sixth, the surface is seen as nearly flat with boulders being rounded clasts. Lastly, stage 7 represents the "gibber plain" phase, where the surface is finally covered in fine silty material and small stones. Due to long term exposure at this stage, desert pavements can be seen as stably developed due to continuous exposure of wetting, drying, and binding of the sediments between the stones, binding them together to create a stable pavement.

== Local names ==
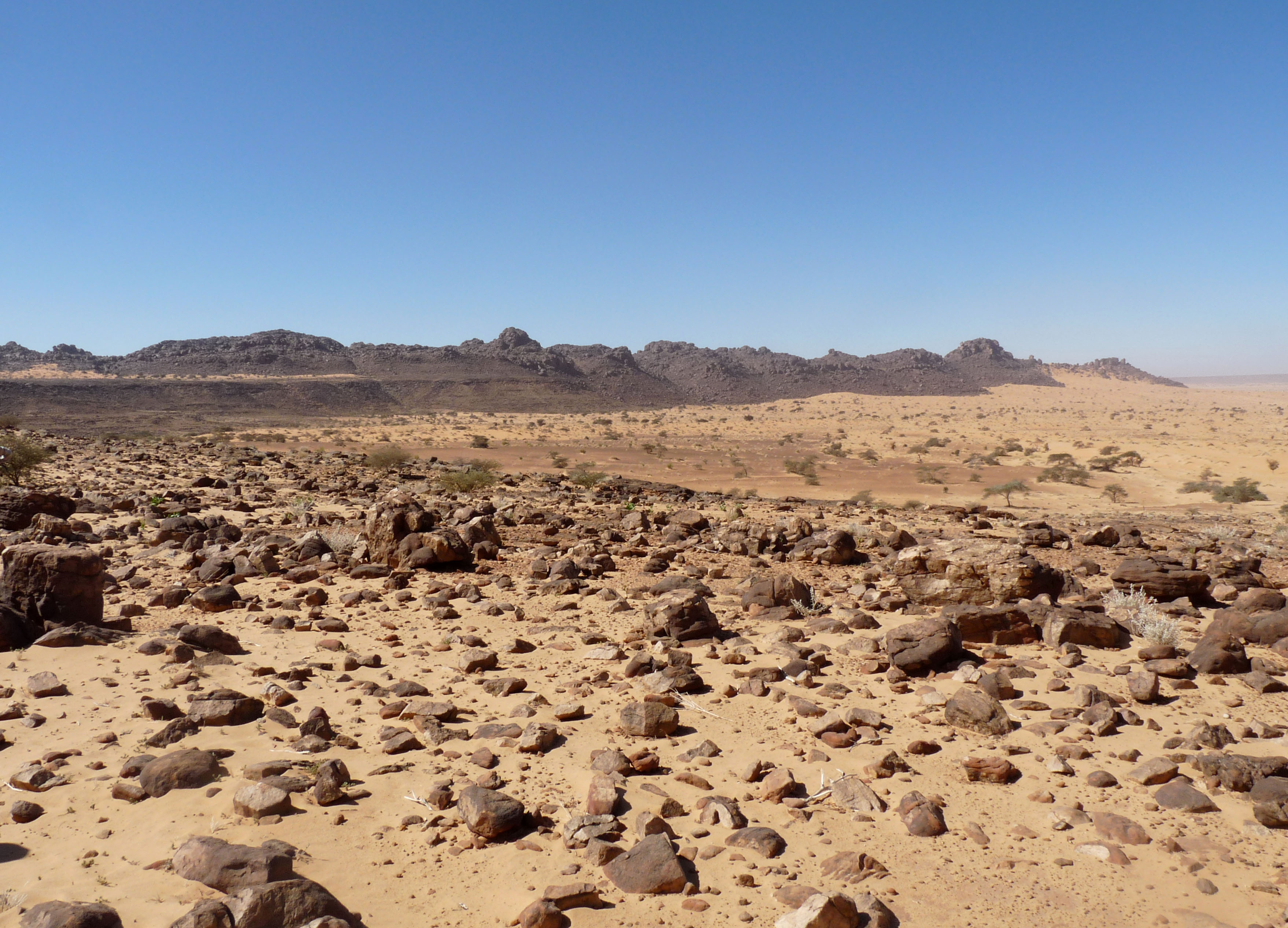
The desert known as Reg de l'Adrar in Mauritania

Stony deserts may be known by different names according to the region. Examples include:

Gibbers: Covering extensive areas in Australia such as parts of the Tirari-Sturt stony desert ecoregion are desert pavements called Gibber Plains after the pebbles or gibbers. Gibber (stony desert) is also used to describe ecological communities, such as Gibber Chenopod Shrublands or Gibber Transition Shrublands. Pilungah Reserve, north-east Simpson Desert, 40km east of Minilya Roadhouse in Pilbara, Sturt Stony Desert.

In North Africa and the Middle East, a vast stony desert plain is known as reg, which involves smaller gravel. This is in contrast with erg, which refers to a sandy desert area.

Hamada, which is a surface covered with residual rocks or boulders that forms a rocky tableland in the western Sahara and the Middle East.

Serir, located in the central Sahara involving stones larger than regs.

Saï, located in the Tarim Basin, which is tightly packed pebbles and gravel.

== See also ==
- Aeolian processes – Processes due to wind activity
- Desert varnish – Orange-to-black rock coating in arid environments
- Eduction (geology) – Sideways spreading in the Earth's crust, a mechanism of surface rock formation
- Erg – Broad area of desert covered with wind-swept sand
- Hamada – Desert landscape with mostly rock instead of sand
- Saltation (geology) – Particle transport by fluids
- Ventifact – Rock that has been eroded by wind-driven sand or ice crystals
