= Cresswell Downs =

Pastoral lease in the Northern Territory

Coordinates: 17.9457°S 135.9006°E

Location in the Northern Territory

Cresswell Downs Station, often referred to as Cresswell Downs, is a pastoral lease that operates as a cattle station in the Northern Territory of Australia.

It is situated about 255 kilometres (158 mi) east of Elliott and 260 kilometres (162 mi) south of Borroloola. Cresswell Downs is surrounded by other properties including Mallapunyah to the north west, Walhallow to the west, Kiana to the north, Calvert Hills Station to the north east, Benmarra to the west, Brunette Downs to the south and Anthony Lagoon to the south west. Several watercourses pass through the property, including Cresswell Creek, Coanjula Creek and Puzzle Creek.

The traditional owners of the area are the Wambaia. The first European to visit the area was the explorer Frank Hann in 1881.

The station was established later the same year and was named after William Rooke Creswell; the name was retained despite the error in spelling. It was selected by Ernest Favenc who had joined an expedition to the area to claim new pastoral lands for himself and his partner, Mr Brodie. A share in the property was sold by in 1881 to the De Salis brothers by Kilgour and Woodhouse. The property occupied an area of 1,500 square miles (3,885 km^{2}) and was unstocked at the time.

By 1883 Ernest Favenc sold his quarter share of the property, now stocked with 2000 head of cattle, to Brodie and De Salis.

In 1895 Sidney North Innes in partnership with Mr. T.A. Perry purchased Cresswell Downs. Perry was killed by the Indigenous Australians who were employed on the station shortly afterwards. Innes carried on for the next several years on his own. On one of the trips Innes was in pursuit of a buyer of a large mob of heifers for over a thousand miles. The drought of the early 1900s depleted the herd and in 1904 the owner completed the sale of what were left, about 3000 head and returned to Oxfordshire in England for the first time in 25 years. He returned in 1905.

In 1906 Cresswell Downs was purchased by brothers Richard Hugh Taylor and William McCurdy Taylor. Both brothers had been working for some time as stockmen in the Gulf region. William died at Anthony's Lagoon aged 53 on 3 January 1915. His brother continued running Cresswell Downs until his death aged 49 on 30 October 1917, leaving his estate including Creswell Downs to his sisters, who sold it in 1918 to James C Hutton, Peter Nalty, Horace V Brumm and Raym Logan. In 1927 it was acquired by Bridget J Naughton. The Taylor brothers helped establish the annual ABC races with neighbouring stations Alexandria Station and Brunette Downs in 1910.

William Naughton acquired the property at some time after 1918 when he was overlanding small herds to butchers in Cloncurry. By 1923 Cresswell was owned by Naughton and Peter Nalty. By 1929 the pair had a falling out which ended up in the Supreme Court with Naughton claiming Nalty owed him £10,000 and 650 cattle and Nalty claiming Naughton owed him £7500, six years' salary and £5834 for a share in the property. Nalty was awarded £7,000 for back-pay but was not given a share of the property. By 1932 Naughton's sons, Tom and Frank were running Cresswell while their father concentrated on his other pastoral interests.

Currently Cresswell Downs is owned by the Paraway Pastoral Company and run in conjunction with Walhallow Station.

== See also ==
- List of ranches and stations
