= Wambaya people =

Total population
- 88 (2006 Census)

Regions with significant populations
- Australia (Northern Territory)

Languages
- Wambaya language, Australian English

The Wambaya people, also spelt Umbaia, Wombaia and other variants, are an Aboriginal Australian people of the southern Barkly Tableland of the Northern Territory. Their language is the Wambaya language. Their traditional lands have now been taken over by large cattle stations.

== Country ==
The Wambaya are an Indigenous Australian people of the southern side of the Barkly Tableland, whose lands were estimated by Tindale to have stretched over some 8,100 square miles (21,000 km^{2}). Their western frontier ran to Eva Downs, while to the east they inhabited the area as far as Mount Morgan. The southern limits were around Alroy Downs. They were present at Anthony Lagoon, Corella Lake, Brunette Downs, and Alexandria, and about the Brunette and Creswell Creeks. Working clockwise, their northern neighbours were the Ngarnka, with Waanyi on their eastern flank and the Wakaya, and then the Warumungu south with the Warlmanpa further west.

== Social organisation ==
R. H. Mathews was the first to describe the class system governing marriage rules of the Wambaya, and used his model as a Wambaya pattern for an Australian intermarriage structure based on eight sectional divisions.

In terms of identity, the way a language describes the landscape in which its speakers live defines their identity. In the case of the Wambaya people this means, as Harold Koch and Rachel Nordlinger state it, following an observation by Nicholas Evans that:

in creation myths it is very common for the ancestors to be described as passing across the lands instilling different languages into different areas as they go. People are then connected to a particular tract of land and, through that connection, to the language associated with that place. Thus the Wambaya people are Wambaya because they are linked to places which are associated with the Wambaya language, and therefore speak Wambaya.

The explorer David Lindsay remarked on the fine build of the Wambaya and other tableland peoples he encountered, with many as tall as 6 feet or over.

== Language ==
The Wambaya language belongs to the Mirndi family of the non-Pama-Nyungan languages.

Noting its unusual word ordering properties, Emily M. Bender described it as a "radically non-configurational language with a second position auxiliary/clitic cluster". She used it to illustrate the LinGO Grammar Matrix.

== History of contact ==
The first colonial intruders into Wambaya lands were struck by the rich pasturing prospects they detected in the vast plains of Mitchell grass with their lagoons, streams and springs. Large herds of cattle were introduced to graze over the tableland, edging out the kangaroo, emus and bustards which had been the hunting staple of the original inhabitants. The Wambaya eventually adapted by taking on work in the cattle industry, though for a long time they were paid less than white stockmen. As late as the 1960s they received a pittance of $6 a week, as opposed to the standard white man's weekly wage $46, for the same labour. With the passage of a ruling by the Commonwealth Conciliation and Arbitration Commission establishing the principle of Equal pay for equal work in the outback, station owners reacted by dismissing their black employees, which meant many Wambaya established in the industry were fired and forced to drift away.

The managers of the Brunette Downs Station endeavoured to bulldoze the last remaining trace of the Wambaya, an encampment they retained on the lagoon, and shift them 60 miles north to Corella Creek.

== Alternative names ==
- Umbaia
- Umbia
- Wambaja
- Wampaja. (Iliaura exonym)
- Wom-by-a, Wombya
- Wombaia, Wonbaia
- Yumpia
