= Cresswell Road =

Cresswell Road Northern Territory

General information
- Type: Road
- Length: 62 km (39 mi)
- Route number(s): State Route 16

Cresswell Road is a designated state route in the Northern Territory of Australia. Forming part of State Route 16, it connects Calvert Road near Elliott with the Tablelands Highway and the Barkly Stock Route.
