= Alroy Downs =

Pastoral lease in the Northern Territory

Coordinates: 19.295°S 136.072°E

Location in Northern Territory

Alroy Downs on the southern Tablelands Highway

Alroy Downs Station is a pastoral lease that operates as a cattle station in Northern Territory.

== Location ==
The property is situated approximately 201 kilometres (125 mi) east of Tennant Creek in the Northern Territory and 226 kilometres (140 mi) west of Camooweal in Queensland. It is located on the Barkly Tableland and a portion of the Playford River flows also through the station, as does a portion of Buchanan Creek. It shares a boundary with Brunette Downs Station to the north, Rockhampton Downs to the west, Dalmore Downs to the south and Alexandria Station to the east. The Tablelands Highway bisects the property.

== Description ==
The landscape consists of clay plains of various origins that support stands of Mitchell and other annual grasses. The southern areas are more lateritic in origin with the red coloured earth of the outback. Drainage areas, coolibah swampland and areas of bluebush are found in the north of the property.

Currently the property occupies an area of 4,232 square kilometres (1,634 sq mi).

== History ==
Alroy Downs was founded on Yindjilandji tribal lands. The lease was first granted in 1877 with the property being established in 1878 by W.Lamb. In 1914 it was acquired by J. C. Schmidt, who appointed F. Story to manage the property. Schmidt's son Rudolf ran the property from 1934 to 1936. It remained in the family and was most recently run by Trevor Schmidt, who was also the managing Director of the Australian Agricultural Company from 1974 to 1988.

The property was acquired by the Stanbroke Pastoral Company in 1984.

Peter Sherwin bought Alroy Downs in 2004 for A$30 million in the Stanbroke sell-off and sold it in 2008 for A$70 million. The property was in the grips of a drought when it was sold. The purchaser was Sterling Buntine.

== See also ==
- List of ranches and stations
- List of the largest stations in Australia
