= Brunette Downs Station =

Pastoral lease in the Northern Territory

Coordinates: 18.6397°S 135.94779°E

Location in Northern Territory

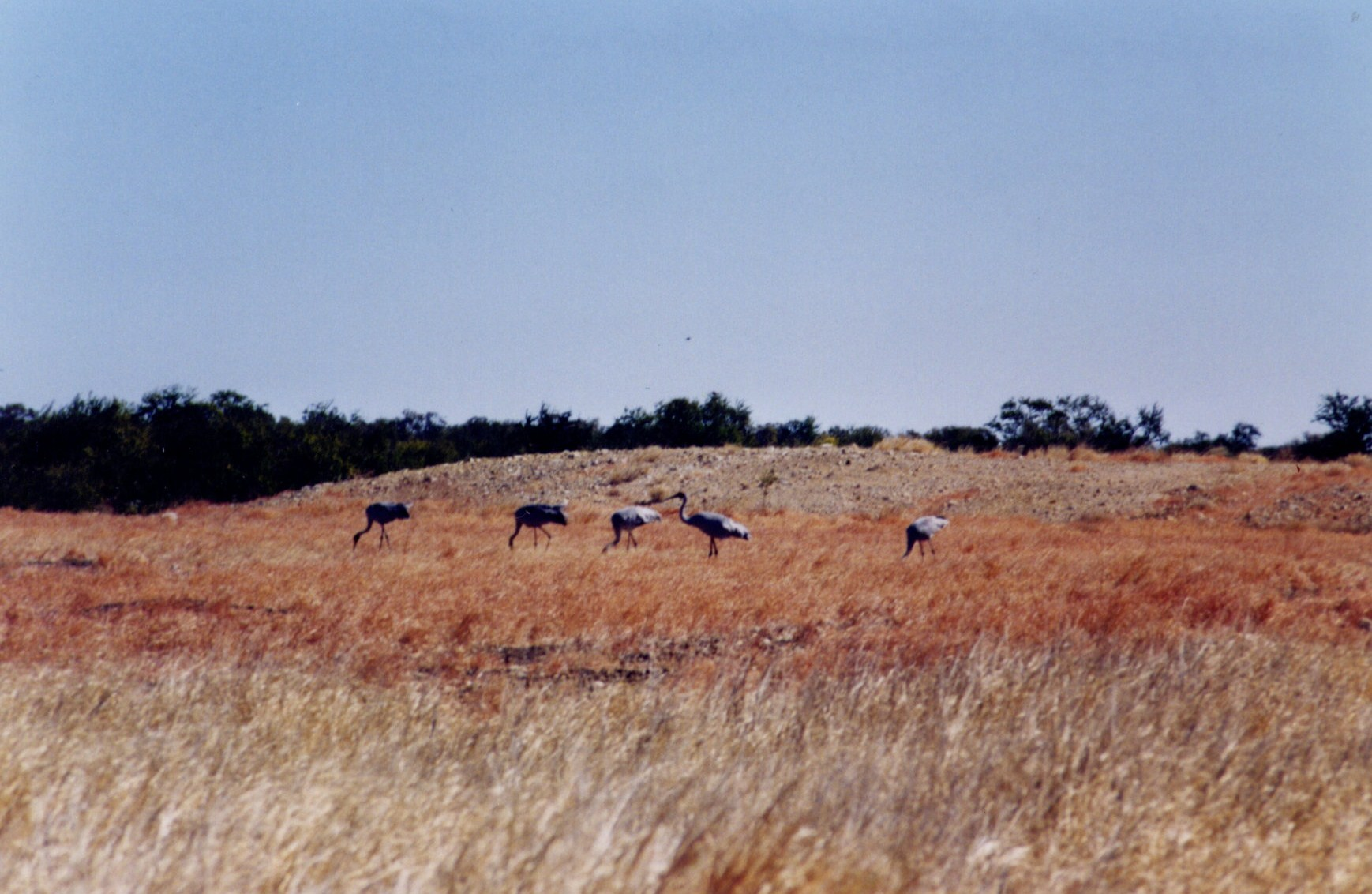
Brolgas, Brunette Downs station, Barkly Tableland, NT

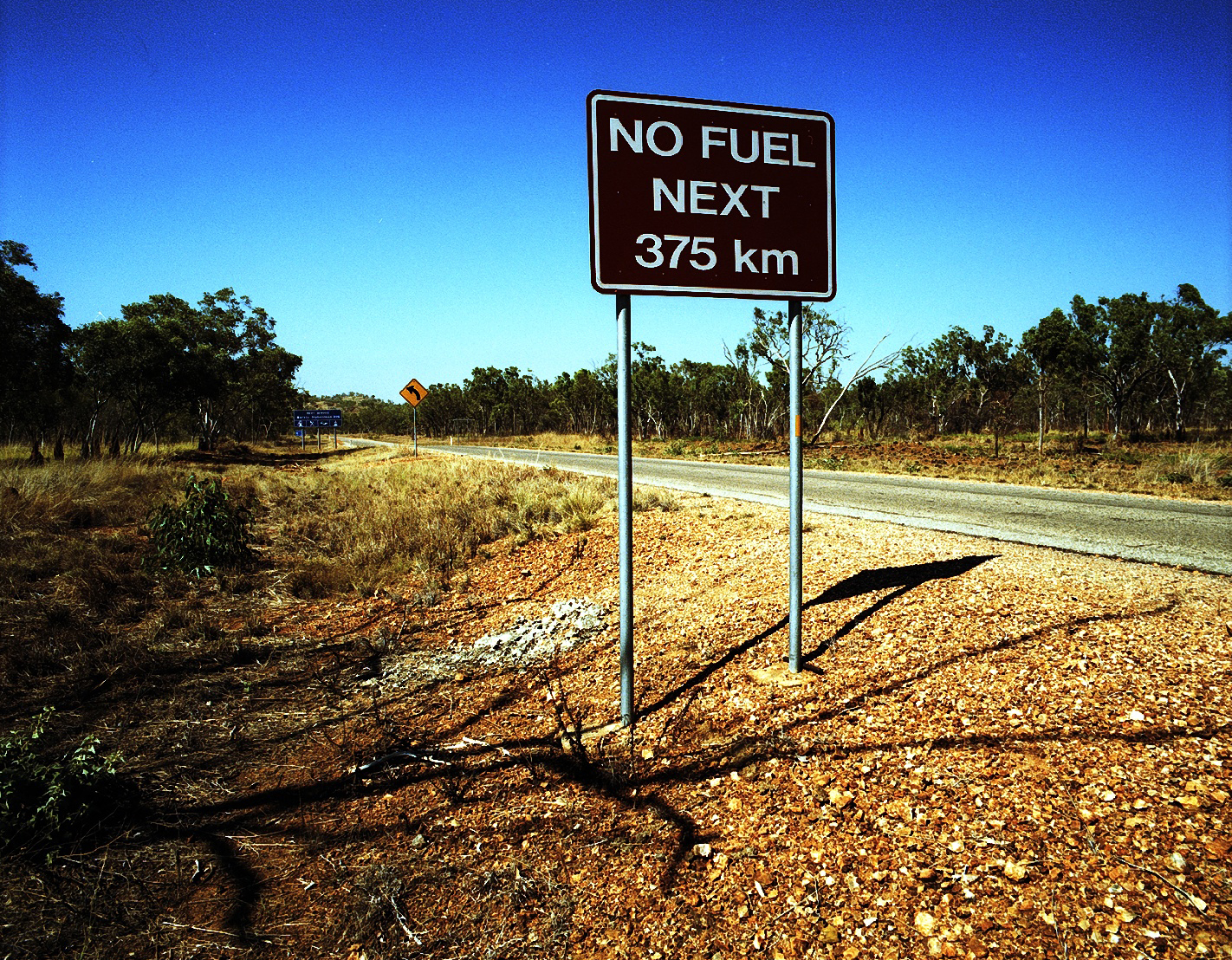
Tablelands Highway

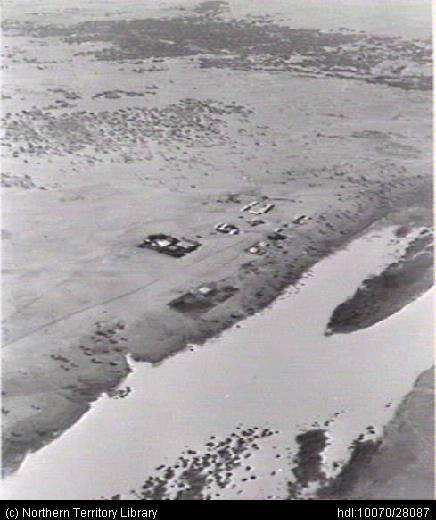
Aerial view of homestead on banks of Brunette Creek c. 1930

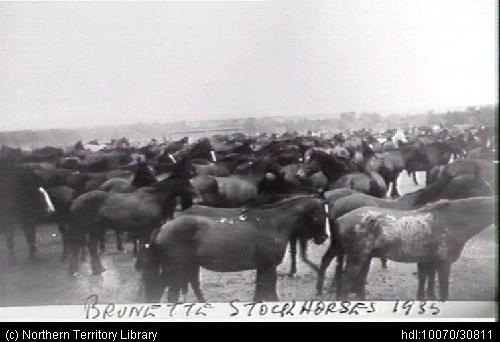
Stockhorses used at Brunette Downs c. 1935

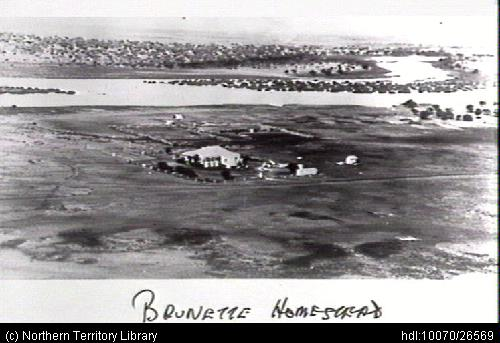
Aerial view of Brunette Downs Homestead 1928

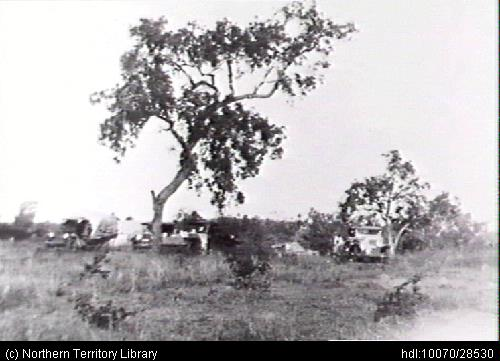
Several cars at a bush campsite Brunette Downs 1928

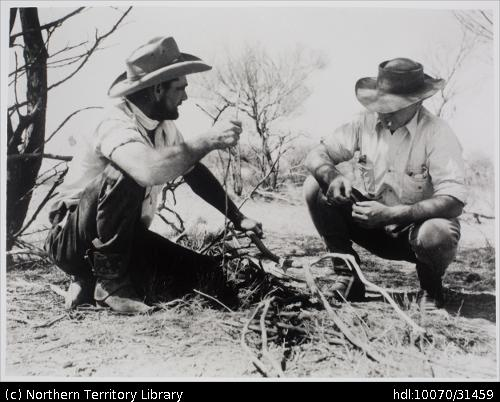
Two stockmen at Brunette Downs c. 1953

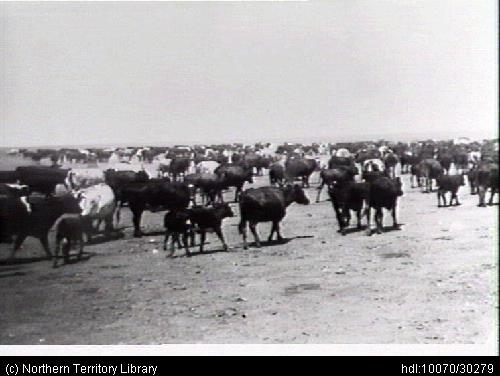
Brunette Downs cattle c. 1930

Brunette Downs Station, mostly referred to as Brunette Downs, is a pastoral lease operating as a cattle station in the Northern Territory of Australia.

== Location ==
Brunette Downs Station is located in the Northern Territory about 216 km (134 mi) north-east of Tennant Creek and about 229 km (142 mi) north west of Camooweal in Queensland. It is bounded by Rockhampton Downs Station to the west, Alroy Downs to the south, Mittiebah and Alexandria Station to the east and Cresswell Downs to the north. The ephemeral waterways Playford River, Brunette Creek, Cresswell Creek and Boree Creek all flow through the property. The Tablelands Highway bisects Brunette Downs.

== Description ==
The station occupies an area of 12,212 km^{2} (4,715 sq mi) on the Barkly Tableland, and is currently owned by the Australian Agricultural Company. It is the second largest station in the Northern Territory (after Alexandria Station), and larger than some countries.

The cattle run on the property are a mixed herd of Barkly Composite, Brahman and Santa Gertrudis. The station has a carrying capacity of 110,000 head, and an annual turn off of 35,000. The operation requires over 50 staff. The black soil of the station is well covered with Mitchell grass and Flinders grass, with a range of native grasses and herbs appearing following the rains. The land area is broken up into 53 paddocks with an average size of 336 km^{2} (130 sq mi). There are also 19 holding paddocks and 16 steel yards. Most of the station is open downs with small wooded areas. A large lake system, called the Brunette Lake system, is also found on the station. The three main lakes in the system are Lake Sylvester, de Burgh and Corella. The system makes up about 20% of the property and is ideal fattening country.

== History ==
The property, ranging over the traditional lands of the Wambaya people, was sold by Messrs Kilgour and Woodhouse to Walter Douglas in 1881 for the sum of £4,000. At this time the property occupied an area of 2,000 sq mi (5,180 km^{2}). Douglas then sold it in 1883 for the sum of £10,000 to Messrs McDonald, Smith and Macansh.

Harry Readford, the cattle duffer and drover upon whose exploits the character Captain Starlight was based, drove the first mob of cattle to Brunette Downs overland from Queensland. He moved one mob of 120 mixed cattle down along the Playford River in 1884, just in time for some good rains to fill the lakes and waterholes. He remained at Brunette for several years as manager, then left in the late 1880s to establish Corella Downs station.

In 1887 the station manager was John Roberts, who sent 1,200 bullocks to market in April of that year.

A murder occurred at the station on New Year's Eve in 1888 when an Indigenous Australian man named Caliph stabbed a stockman named Robert Hamilton to death in a hut on the property. Another man named Samuel Muggleton found Hamilton's body, then the badly injured Caliph, who claimed that Hamilton had kicked him in the back so he had stabbed him. John Roberts was informed, and held an inquiry, but Caliph succumbed to his wounds and died the following day.

Flooding occurred in 1891 when the rivers rose and washed away outlying huts from both Brunette Downs and Corella Downs station.

More severe flooding occurred in the area about the station during the monsoon of 1895. Brunette Downs received 15.5 in (394 mm) of rain in January 1895 followed by another 9.5 in (241 mm) in February .

The station sank its first sub-artesian bore in 1903, and had 180 bores pumping water up from 100 m (328 ft) by 2010. Water is pumped into over 200 ponds and 400 troughs to keep the stock well watered.

In 1918 the Gulf Cattle Company put Brunette Downs up for auction. The station held 40,000 head of cattle and 900 horses, and comprised 5,471 sq mi (14,170 km^{2}) of territory. Sub-aretesian bores and other improvements advertised to be worth £45,000 as well as working plant were included in the sale. No bids were received, and the property was passed in. At the same time, two neighbouring properties, Walhallow and Eva Downs, were also put up for auction. The James white family from Muswellbrook bought Brunette Downs in 1919.

By 1923 the size of the property was estimated at 5,100 sq mi (13,209 km^{2}) and was one of the larger runs in the Northern Territory, although less than half the size of Victoria River Downs, which occupied 13,100 sq mi (33,929 km^{2}).

Dr Rudolf Asmis, Nazi Germany's Consul General to Australia, visited Brunette Downs for three days in 1935 while travelling to Darwin.

Following drought in 1952, cattle from the station were overlanded to Mount Isa for agistment in Blackall-Longreach country. More than 6,000 cattle would take the walk that took several weeks through dry country.

Prince Philip, Duke of Edinburgh, visited the station in 1956 on his way to the Olympic Games in Melbourne. Flying from Darwin, the Prince spent the morning with Paul Hasluck and Mr. E. Barnes (the station manager) in 107 °F (42 °C) watching stockmen work. He then flew onward to Tennant Creek and Alice Springs for the night.

In early 1958 following drought conditions some 25,000 head of cattle perished from a lack of water.

The property was bought from the James White family by a Texan-Australian venture, the King Ranch Pastoral Company, in 1958 for over A$1 million. Upon acquiring the station the company spent £500,000 on improvements such as new buildings; only the original homestead and corrugated iron station store remained.

By 1966 the station was stocked with over 50,000 cattle, despite a year-long drought. The station had a reported area of 4,750 sq mi (12,302 km^{2}) in 1966, and the manager was Charles Weiss. Weiss introduced 1,200 Santa Gertrudis stud bulls into the herd to improve the stock, and the station had a total of 75 bores to help combat future droughts.

The overseer and Assistant Manager to Charlie Weiss during much of that period was Nick Campbell-Jones, who commenced as a jackaroo on Brunette Downs at the start of 1963 and left in 1975. Many of his experiences at Brunette Downs during that period, as well working on other stations in the Northern Territory and Queensland, are recounted in his autobiography Don't Die Wondering published in 2012.

Between January 1973 and March 1974 the area received record rainfall, 1,575 mm (62 in) compared to an annual average of 355 mm (14 in). This left 4,050 km^{2} (1,000,777 acres) of the property underwater, and filled the normally dry lakes of Corella and Sylvester. By 1977 the lakes were still active, and were home to over 500,000 pelicans that had come to the area to nest.

By 1978 the station had a herd of 56,000 head of cattle and some 800 horses. Some of the staff included on the station payroll were a full-time saddle maker, clinic nurse, pilot and grader driver. The grader driver tended to the 3,600 km (2,237 mi) of graded roads on the property. Other infrastructure included a laboratory, general store and drive-in picture theatre. Ken Warriner was the manager of the station in 1978. He had previously run other King Ranch properties, Mount House and Glenroy, and would later go on to be a part owner of Newcastle Waters station and chairman of the Consolidated Pastoral Company.

The station was acquired by the Australian Agricultural Company in 1979, and Warriner left in 1980 to take over Henbury and Newcastle Waters as a part owner.

Henry Burke managed the station for a number of years before taking up the General Manager position at AACo in March 2012. His replacement is Michael Johnson, who previously managed Avon Downs station.

== Climate ==
Climate data for Brunette Downs, elevation 218 m (715 ft), (1991–2020 normals, extremes 1957–2022)
Month	Jan	Feb	Mar	Apr	May	Jun	Jul	Aug	Sep	Oct	Nov	Dec	Year
Record high °C (°F)	45.6 (114.1)	45.5 (113.9)	42.9 (109.2)	39.8 (103.6)	38.5 (101.3)	35.9 (96.6)	36.0 (96.8)	37.4 (99.3)	40.4 (104.7)	44.2 (111.6)	44.3 (111.7)	45.5 (113.9)	45.6 (114.1)
Mean daily maximum °C (°F)	36.9 (98.4)	36.2 (97.2)	35.4 (95.7)	34.0 (93.2)	30.0 (86.0)	27.1 (80.8)	27.3 (81.1)	29.7 (85.5)	34.2 (93.6)	36.9 (98.4)	38.1 (100.6)	38.0 (100.4)	33.7 (92.6)
Mean daily minimum °C (°F)	24.6 (76.3)	24.1 (75.4)	22.5 (72.5)	19.5 (67.1)	15.0 (59.0)	11.9 (53.4)	11.1 (52.0)	12.4 (54.3)	17.4 (63.3)	21.0 (69.8)	23.4 (74.1)	24.6 (76.3)	19.0 (66.1)
Record low °C (°F)	16.5 (61.7)	15.3 (59.5)	11.4 (52.5)	8.7 (47.7)	4.0 (39.2)	1.7 (35.1)	1.4 (34.5)	1.7 (35.1)	5.0 (41.0)	7.5 (45.5)	13.2 (55.8)	15.0 (59.0)	1.4 (34.5)
Average rainfall mm (inches)	113.4 (4.46)	115.8 (4.56)	63.9 (2.52)	17.8 (0.70)	5.4 (0.21)	5.4 (0.21)	0.8 (0.03)	0.8 (0.03)	3.6 (0.14)	22.2 (0.87)	38.4 (1.51)	98.4 (3.87)	485.9 (19.11)
Average rainy days (≥ 1.0 mm)	9.4	8.5	4.6	1.5	0.8	0.5	0.2	0.3	0.6	2.1	4.0	7.1	39.6
Source: Australian Bureau of Meteorology

== See also ==
- List of ranches and stations
- List of the largest stations in Australia
