= Rocklands Station =

Pastoral lease in the Northern Territory

Coordinates: 19°51′49″S 138°5′12″E

Location in the Northern Territory

Rocklands Station is a pastoral lease that operates as a cattle station along the border of the Northern Territory and Queensland in the Barkly Tableland region. The station was established in 1865 by brothers James and George Sutherland.

It is situated about 10 kilometres (6 mi) north of Camooweal and 120 kilometres (75 mi) north east of Alpurrurulam. The property shares a boundary with Adder and Avon Downs Station to the west, Alexandria Station to the north and Austral Downs to the south. The Herbert River flows through the middle of the property. The Barkly Highway runs through the southern end of the property.

== History ==
=== British exploration ===
In 1861, an expedition led by William Landsborough became the first British entry into the area. Following what became known as the Georgina River, he named several connected waterholes as Mary Lake, Lake Francis and Lake Kenellan, around which Rocklands station was later established. Landsborough found the Aboriginal people abundant in the vicinity, writing that:

This place seems a favourite resort for blacks...there were about one hundred blacks in the neighbourhood of the camp some of whom were so bold that I feared it might be necessary to shoot some of them.

=== Establishment of Rocklands ===
In 1865, venture pastoralist George Sutherland arrived at Mary Lake with 8,000 sheep to establish Rocklands sheep station. He described their arrival as:

"On the left bank of the river at the lake [was] a large camp of blacks, on rushed the sheep through fires, blacks, and all other impediments to quench their thirst. The unfortunate niggers had a terrible time of it. To be roused up out of their sleep at midnight by some 8,000 sheep rushing madly and tumbling over them was chaos, was something demonical to the simple natives, who never saw, or heard of jumbucks before."

The Aboriginal inhabitants resisted Sutherland's aim to dispossess them.

"After the fright the blacks got on the night of our arrival to rob them of their country, we thought the poor wretches would give us a very wide berth, [however] a shower of spears, nulla-nullas, and other waddies came flying in all directions. Unfortunately only one of the whole party had any firearms, all left in the tents. The one possessing a revolver fired twice at the niggers, haphazard in the dark. Of course all made a rush to the tents, to secure, firearms, but in the dark these were not easily found, and had the savages followed us up, they could easily have massacred the lot of us. However they didn’t, but grabbed and took everything they could lay hands on."

The next morning Sutherland and his companions, armed and mounted, went to pursue "the niggers" but only found an empty camp. They returned to the lakes and started work to survey and form the property. Some Aboriginal men defiantly returned to the lakes to place bird traps and one of Sutherland's workers:

"walked up to them, revolver in hand. They started away and he turned round to walk back. As he did one of the myalls swung round and hit him a terrific blow on the back of the head which rendered him insensible for three days. Fortunately the deed was noticed from the camp and two or three rushed down on foot and fired, but the niggers got clean away."

However, drought soon set in with the Mary and Francis lakes drying up. Sutherland shifted his camp and stock to nearby Don Creek where the Aborigines had taken refuge. Sutherland, with the assistance of a fellow grazier William Lyne, resorted to force to displace them once more, writing that:

"Lyne and Steiglitz were camped for some time with their sheep...looking for country to take up. Noticing several blacks’ fires near us, we deemed it fully time to make a raid, and drive them back. Mr Lyne and myself made for the fires, and before reaching them we met a large mob of the niggers...as the darkies advanced...we were prepared to stand our ground and fight the battle out...one of our party raised his carbine [and] fired, and [they] all fled back for their lives, but to frighten them we kept trotting behind them to give them a further scare and make them understand we were their masters".

Within a few years, flood, drought and the cost of transportation of wool forced Sutherland and the other pastoralists to leave the Georgina River leaseholds. Sutherland had abandoned Rocklands by 1869.

=== Rocklands Pastoral Company ===
In the early 1880s, MacDermott, Loughnan and Scarr formed the Rocklands Pastoral Company and W.H. Crawford was employed as the property manager at Rocklands. In 1883, Crawford was "galloping after the blacks" on the station, firing shots at them from his revolver. He struck "his own station black", who in conjunction with other Aboriginal men, killed Crawford with a waddy. A detachment of Native Police under Sub-inspector James Lamond conducted a punitive expedition killing "the station boy" and "dispersing" all the adult males of the tribe deemed responsible.

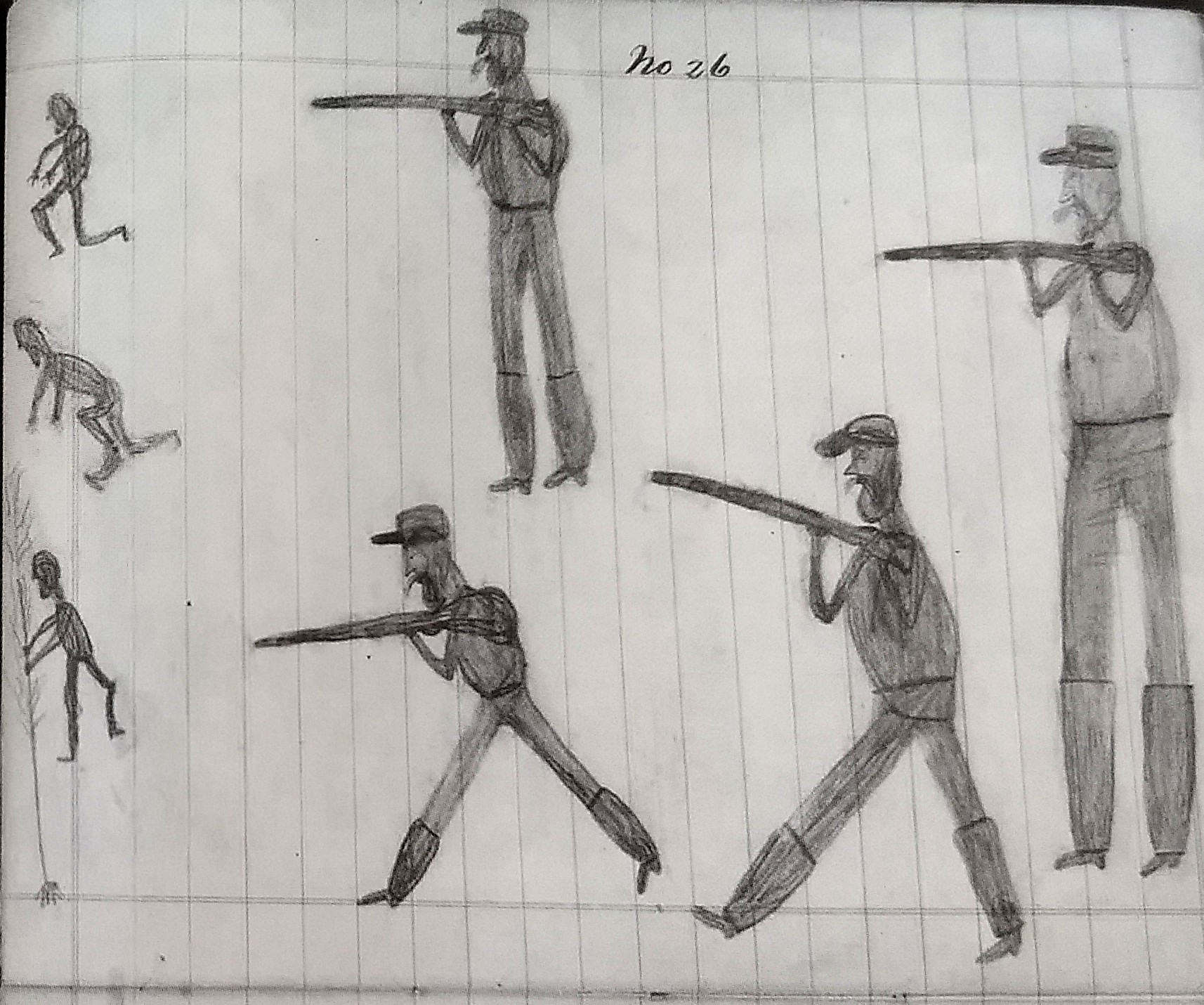
Drawing by Aboriginal boy Oscar of a Native Police operation around Rocklands Station

The company then appointed Augustus Henry Glissan as manager who remained at Rocklands for many years. In 1887, Glissan brought a kidnapped Aboriginal boy named Oscar to the property from Cooktown, Queensland. Oscar worked as a station-hand at the property and recorded his experiences there in a series of sketches now held at the National Museum Australia. In these drawings are depicted Aboriginal people working on the property and conducting traditional ceremony. Oscar also drew Aboriginal men being chained up and shot dead by Native Police troopers.

Rocklands Pastoral Company, in various forms, retained ownership of Rocklands Station well into the twentieth century.

=== Later changes of ownership ===
Western Grazing acquired Rocklands, from the Stanbroke Pastoral Company, in 2004 at the same time as acquiring Tanbar.

The 6,679 km^{2} (2,579 sq mi) property was acquired by the Paraway Pastoral Company from the Western Grazing Company in 2016 along with Tanbar Station for A$130 million. The property was stocked with 35,000 head of Brahman, Brahman cross Santa, Charbray and Senegus cattle.

Rocklands Station records are held in the State Library of Queensland.

== See also ==
- List of ranches and stations
