= Acacia nicholsonensis =

Scientific classification
- Kingdom: Plantae
- Clade: Tracheophytes
- Clade: Angiosperms
- Clade: Eudicots
- Clade: Rosids
- Order: Fabales
- Family: Fabaceae
- Subfamily: Caesalpinioideae
- Clade: Mimosoid clade
- Genus: Acacia
- Species: A. nicholsonensis

Binomial name
- Acacia nicholsonensis Cuff

Species of legume

Acacia nicholsonensis is a species of flowering plant in the family Fabaceae, and is endemic to the Northern Territory, Australia. It is an inverted cone-shaped shrub or small tree with "minni ritchi" bark, linear to narrowly linear phyllodes, spikes of golden yellow flowers and linear to narrowly oblong, leathery to almost woody pods.

== Description ==
Acacia nicholsonensis is an inverted cone-shaped shrub or small tree that typically grows to a height of 3–6 m (9.8–19.7 ft) and has red to reddish-brown "minni ritchi" bark and branchlet with hairs pressed against the surface. Its phyllodes are linear to narrowly linear, 100–150 mm (3.9–5.9 in) long, 1.1–1.5 mm (0.043–0.059 in) wide, flat and straight to slightly curved. There is a short, hard point on the ends of the phyllode and usually 5 to 8 conspicuous longitudinal veins. The flowers are borne in spikes 15–25 mm (0.59–0.98 in) long on densely hairy peduncles 3–9 mm (0.12–0.35 in) long. Flowering time is uncertain, but seemingly occurs between June and September, and the pods are linear to narrowly oblong, 40–110 mm (1.6–4.3 in) long,2.4–4 mm (0.094–0.157 in) long, leathery to subwoody, and densely covered with woolly golden-brown hairs.

== Taxonomy ==
Acacia nicholsonensis was first formally described in 2017 by Nicholas J. Cuff in the journal Nuytsia from specimens found near the Nicholson River crossing in the Waanyi/Garawa Aboriginal Land Trust area of the Northern Territory in 2010. The specific epithet (nicholsonensis) is derived from the locality of the type collection on the South Nicholson River.

== Distribution and habitat ==
This species of wattle occurs in fine, red-brown loamy soils on the lower leeves and banks of the upper reaches of the South Nicholson River, and is only known from the Waanyi/Garawa Aboriginal Land Trust and the adjacent Benmarra Station in the Gulf Fall and Uplands and Darwin Coastal bioregions in the north of the Northern Territory.

== Conservation status ==
Acacia nicholsonensis is listed as "near threatened" under the Northern Territory Government Territory Parks and Wildlife Conservation Act.

== See also ==
- List of Acacia species
