= Jacksonia lateritica =

Scientific classification
- Kingdom: Plantae
- Clade: Tracheophytes
- Clade: Angiosperms
- Clade: Eudicots
- Clade: Rosids
- Order: Fabales
- Family: Fabaceae
- Subfamily: Faboideae
- Genus: Jacksonia
- Species: J. lateritica

Binomial name
- Jacksonia lateritica Chappill

Species of legume

Jacksonia lateritica is a species of flowering plant in the family Fabaceae and is endemic to northern Australia. It is an erect, sparsely branching shrub, the end branches phylloclades, the leaves reduced to egg-shaped scale leaves, the flowers yellow-orange, and the fruit a woody, densely hairy pod.

== Description ==
Jacksonia lateritica is an erect, sparsely branched shrub that typically grows up to 0.3–1.5 m (1 ft 0 in – 4 ft 11 in) high and 1.0–1.5 m (3 ft 3 in – 4 ft 11 in) wide, its branches greyish-green, or reddish-brown, the end branches phylloclades. Its leaves are reduced to brown, egg-shaped scales, 0.4–0.9 mm (0.016–0.035 in) long, 0.3–0.6 mm (0.012–0.024 in) wide. The flowers are sparsely arranged along the branches, each flower on a pedicel 0.9–1.3 mm (0.035–0.051 in) long. There are broadly egg-shaped bracteoles 0.6–1 mm (0.024–0.039 in) long and 0.7–0.8 mm (0.028–0.031 in) wide on the pedicels. The floral tube is 1.3–1.7 mm (0.051–0.067 in) long and ribbed, the sepals membranous, the upper lobes 2.8–2.9 mm (0.11–0.11 in) long and 1.2–1.3 mm (0.047–0.051 in) wide and fused at the base for 2.4–2.7 mm (0.094–0.106 in), the lower lobes longer and narrower. The petals are yellow-orange, the standard petal 3.2–4.2 mm (0.13–0.17 in) long and 4.4–4.9 mm (0.17–0.19 in) deep, the wings 3.8–3.9 mm (0.15–0.15 in) long, and the keel 4.0–4.4 mm (0.16–0.17 in) long. The stamens have brown filaments 2.2–4.3 mm (0.087–0.169 in) long. Flowering occurs from April to October, and the fruit is a woody, elliptic pod, 3.8–4.5 mm (0.15–0.18 in) long, 1.9–2.2 mm (0.075–0.087 in) wide and densely covered with white hairs.

== Taxonomy ==
Jacksonia lateritica was first formally described in 2007 by Jennifer Anne Chappill in Australian Systematic Botany from specimens collected 40 km (25 mi) west of Calvert Hills in the Northern Territory. The specific epithet (lateritica) means 'dark brick-red', referring to the plant's growing on lateritic soils.

== Distribution and habitat ==
This species of Jacksonia grows in woodland on yellow sand over laterite, in the far east of the Northern Territory in the Gulf Fall and Uplands bioregion and near Camooweal and south of Mount Isa, with an outlier near Jericho, in the Mount Isa Inlier bioregion.

== Conservation status ==
Jacksonia lateritica is listed as "data deficient" in the Territory Parks and Wildlife Conservation Act and as "least concern" under the Nature Conservation Act in Queensland.
