= Wambaya =

Wambaya may refer to:

- Wambaya people
- Wambaya language
