= Barkly Stock Route =

Barkly Stock Route Northern Territory

General information
- Type: Road
- Length: 229 km (142 mi)
- Route number(s): State Route 16

Barkly Stock Route is a designated state route in the Northern Territory of Australia. Forming part of State Route 16, it connects the Stuart Highway near Elliott with the Tablelands Highway and Cresswell Road.

== Upgrades ==
The Northern Australia Beef Roads Program announced in 2016 included the following project for the Barkly Stock Route.

=== Road upgrading ===
The project to upgrade a section to a two-lane standard seal was completed in late 2019 at a total cost of $13.7 million.
