= Calvert Road =

Calvert Road Northern Territory

General information
- Type: Road
- Length: 257 km (160 mi)
- Route number(s): State Route 16

Calvert Road is a designated state route in the Northern Territory of Australia. Forming part of State Route 16, it connects Highway 1 on a joint section of the Savannah Way and Carpentaria Highway near Calvert Hills with the Tablelands Highway near Cresswell Downs.
