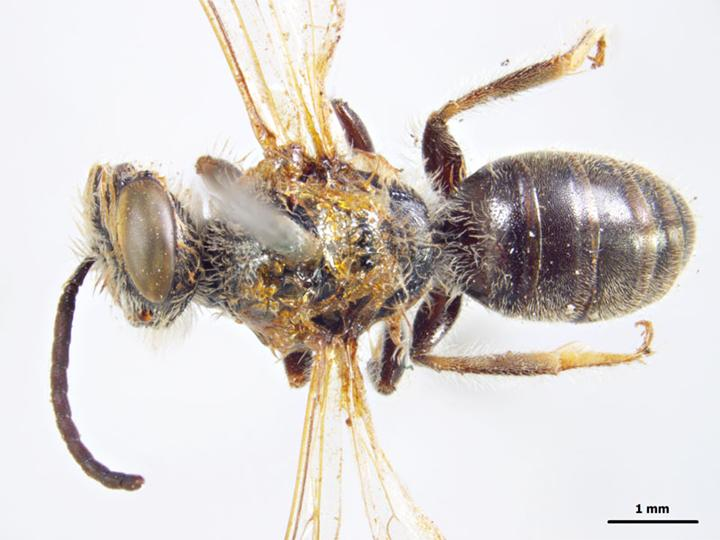
- Male

Scientific classification
- Kingdom: Animalia
- Phylum: Arthropoda
- Clade: Pancrustacea
- Class: Insecta
- Order: Hymenoptera
- Family: Colletidae
- Genus: Leioproctus
- Species: L. abnormis

Binomial name
- Leioproctus abnormis (Cockerell, 1916)

Synonyms
- Paracolletes abnormis Cockerell, 1916

= Leioproctus abnormis =

Species of bee

Leioproctus abnormis, or Leioproctus (Minycolletes) abnormis, is a species of bee in the family Colletidae and subfamily Colletinae. It is endemic to Australia. It was described by British-American entomologist Theodore Dru Alison Cockerell in 1916.

== Description ==
Male body length is about 6 mm. Colouration is mainly black, with white hair.

== Distribution and habitat ==
The species occurs in both northern and eastern mainland Australia. The type locality is Alexandria in the Northern Territory.

== Behaviour ==
The adults are flying mellivores. Flowering plants visited by the bees include Astrotricha longifolia and Angophora floribunda.

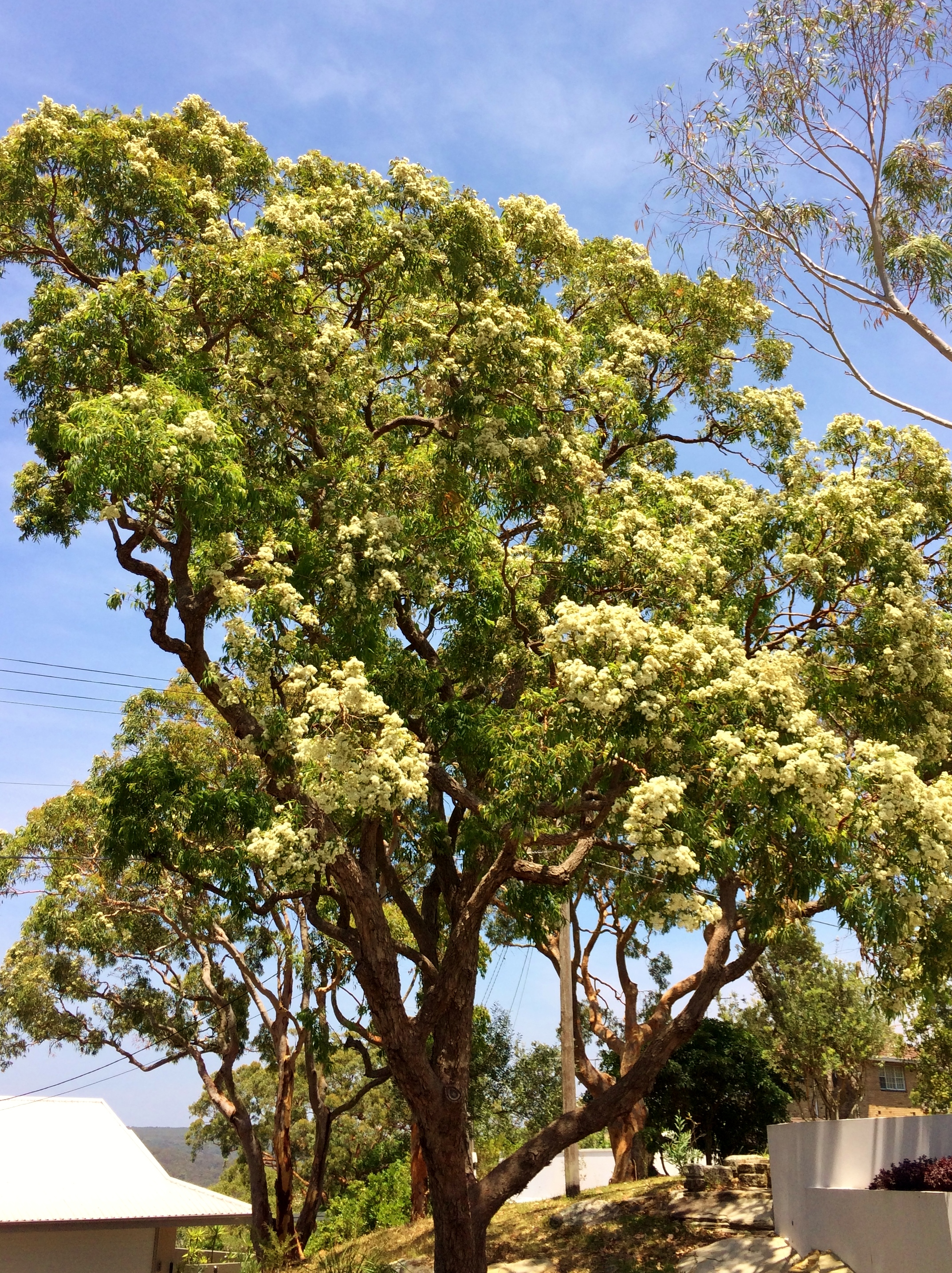
Angophora floribunda (rough-barked apple), a forage plant of the bees, in flower
