= Tanbar Station =

Cattle station in Queensland, Australia

Coordinates: 25.84073°S 141.91783°E

Location in Queensland

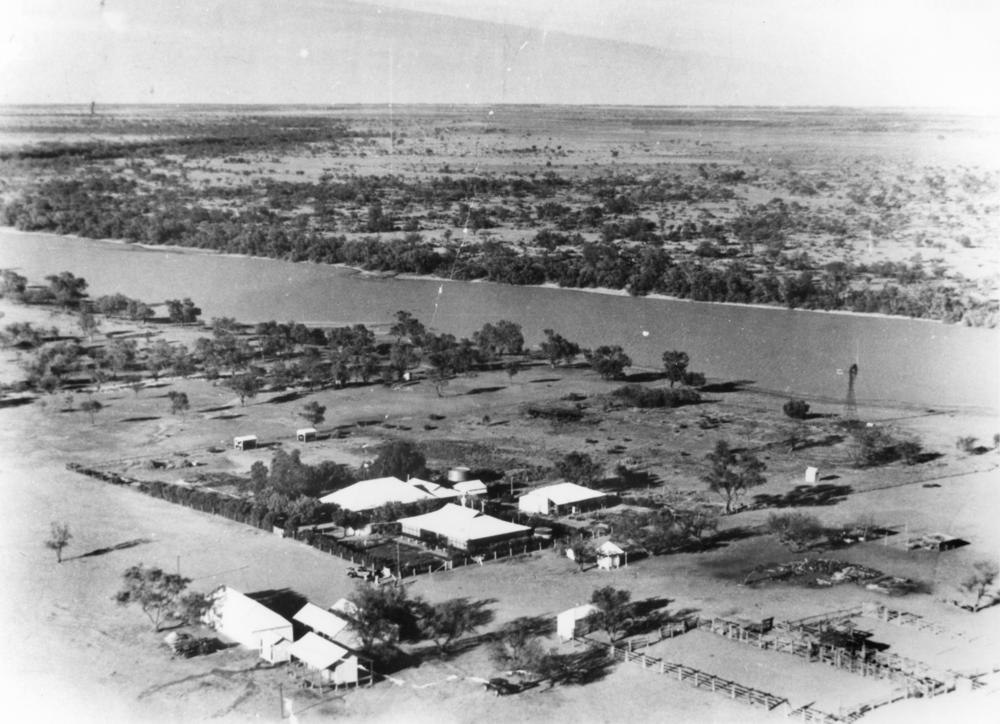
Tanbar Station, November 1939

Tanbar Station is a pastoral lease that currently operates as a cattle station in Tanbar, Shire of Barcoo, Queensland, Australia.

It is located approximately 87 kilometres (54 mi) south west of Windorah and 240 kilometres (149 mi) north east of Innamincka in the Channel Country of Queensland. The Cooper Creek runs through the property.

IT was established at some time prior to 1884 by John Costello, who sold it to Armitage and Gillately shortly after taking it up. In 1886 the property was having a good season with 6 inches (152 mm) of rain recorded in less than a month and all the waterholes were full. John Henderson was running Tanbar in 1888. Mr B. Richardson acquired both Tanbar and Abbottsford Station, which is also on Cooper Creek, in 1903. By 1907 the Christian brothers owned Tanbar.

The property was sold in 1911 when it was stocked with 10,000 cattle by the Christian brothers to the Rocklands Pastoral Company for £30,000.

By 1931 the station encompassed an area of 3,000 square miles (7,770 km^{2}) and was managed by Robert John Kyle Little but the property was still owned by Rocklands. One neighbouring property at the time was Keeroongooloo Station.

The station was isolated by flood-waters for over a month in 1949; aeroplanes had to conduct food drops to Tanbar and surrounding areas.

In 2002 Tanbar was having a poor season and was stocked with 5,000 head of cattle, down from the 24,000 head it was able to carry.

Western Grazing acquired Tanbar, from the Stanbroke Pastoral Company, in 2004 at the same time as Rocklands Station found further to the north-west along the Northern Territory border.

Currently owned by Paraway Pastoral Company the property occupies an area of 8,300 square kilometres (3,205 sq mi) and is managed by Trent and Heidi Millership.

== See also ==
- List of ranches and stations
- List of the largest stations in Australia
