= Augustus Downs Station =

Pastoral lease in Queensland

Coordinates: 18.549°S 139.868°E

Location in Queensland

Augustus Downs Station is a pastoral lease that operates as a cattle station in the Gulf Country of outback Queensland.

It is situated 100 kilometres (62 mi) south of Burketown and 160 kilometres (99 mi) south west of Normanton. The Leichhardt River and numerous tributaries flow through the property.

Oscar John de Satgé acquired the property in around 1881 along with Carandotta Station after selling Coreena Station for £70,000.

In 1901 the property shared a boundary with Lorraine Station, although it was not fenced and cattle from both properties grazed in each other's pastures.

Sidney Kidman was a director of the Augustus Downs Pastoral Company until 1935. William Charles Angliss was also a director in the company.

In 2003 the property was owned by the Stanbroke Pastoral Company.

== See also ==
- List of ranches and stations
