= Paraway Pastoral Company =

- Type: Private (Ltd)
- Industry: Livestock (cattle and sheep) and cropping
- Founded: 2007
- Headquarters: Orange, NSW, Australia
- Key people: Bruce Terry (Chairman) Harvey Gaynor (CEO)
- Owner: Wholly owned operating entity of the Macquarie Pastoral Fund
- Number of employees: 244 full time and seasonal staff
- Website: http://www.paraway.com.au

Paraway Pastoral Company (Paraway) is a privately owned operating entity of the Macquarie Pastoral Fund and runs a total of 28 stations across Queensland (Northern), New South Wales (Central) and Victoria (Southern). As at 2025, these 28 stations cover a combined total of 4 480 000 hectares, with the ability to run more than 250 000 head of cattle and 240 000 head of sheep across the portfolio. The core strategy by which Paraway bases its operations is "Paraway is committed to being a consistent, reliable supplier of quality product to its customers".

Paraway is set to be sold by Macquarie Bank in July 2025, industry speculation has the asset valued in the $2.5-$3 billion range.

== History and legacy ==
Paraway was established in 2007 and a name for the new company was based on the nickname, “Paraway”, given to pastoralist, drover and explorer Nathanial ‘Nat’ Buchanan by the local Aboriginal people.

=== Nathaniel "Nat" Buchanan ===
Nathaniel Buchanan (1826 – 23 September 1901) was born in Ireland, near Dublin, although was originally of Scottish descent. He arrived in Sydney in January 1837 and settled in the New England area in 1839. Buchanan became known as ‘Paraway’ because of its similarity to the phrase, “far away”, as the local Aboriginals noted that he was always coming from or going somewhere far away. 'Paraway' was also the first European to cross the Barkly Tablelands from east to west during which he took a large herd of breeding cattle from Queensland to the Northern Territory. Today, Paraway Pastoral owns several portions of this land, thus maintaining their connection to the Paraway name.

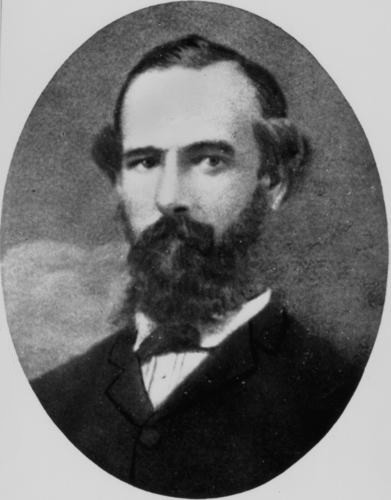
Nathaniel 'Nat' Buchanan

In 1859, Buchanan and fellow explorer, William Landsborough embarked on a joint search for grazing land. Setting off from Rockhampton on their first voyage, they explored country around the Fitzroy and Belyando Rivers before heading further west. They ran out of supplies on this voyage however, and had to be rescued by a relief party. The following year they found 1500 sq. miles (388 500 ha) of land on the Thompson River which they secured in 1863 with the capital being supplied by Robert Morehead of the Scottish Australian Company. Similarly, in 1861, William Landsborough formed the Landsborough River Company with Buchanan and Edward Cornish through which they applied for 15 runs of 100 sq. miles each (25 900ha) near Longreach to stock what he named Bowen Downs. Bowen Downs prospered for a time but there was eventually a fall in the market (mainly due to drought) and the price of cattle and wool dropped so low that the station had to be abandoned and Buchanan lost almost everything he had to his name. These exploratory missions and the introduction of pastoral companies such as the Scottish Australian Company into Australia paved the way for companies like Paraway to emerge.

After several decades of exploring and establishing various properties and pastoral expeditions across Queensland and the Northern Territory, Buchanan died in 1901 (aged 75) on his farm Dungowan Creek, his final property purchase. He married his wife Catherine Buchanan (née Gordon) in 1863 who survived him along with their son Gordon (born 1864).

== Operations ==
=== Cattle ===
Paraway is involved in the breeding and growing of beef cattle across all its portfolios. The 'Northern' properties run a mix of Brahman and Brahman X in their herds, whilst those based in the 'Central' regions run an Angus breeding herd. In the Southern region, several properties run trade cattle and when conditions permit they are used to finish Paraway bred cattle as well. One such finishing property, Newstead Station, was the subject of Tom Robert's oil painting The Golden Fleece. Collectively, Paraway's properties have the ability to run over 200 000 head of cattle and produce in excess of 20 million kilograms of beef each year.

==== Davenport Downs ====
Davenport Downs consists of two original properties, Davenport Downs and Springvale, purchased by Paraway in 2009 and 2011 respectively. Together they form a 1.5 million hectare aggregation that deals with fattening over 29 000 steers. Its land size makes Davenport Downs Paraway's biggest property as well as the largest cattle station in Queensland. Davenport Downs is chiefly Mitchell grass and channel country with its water sourced from a network of bores, as well the Diamantina River and Farrahs Creek that crosscut the property. These waterways often flood during the wet season, covering up to one quarter of the property and contributing to a reliable source of feed throughout the rest of the year

==== Tanbar ====
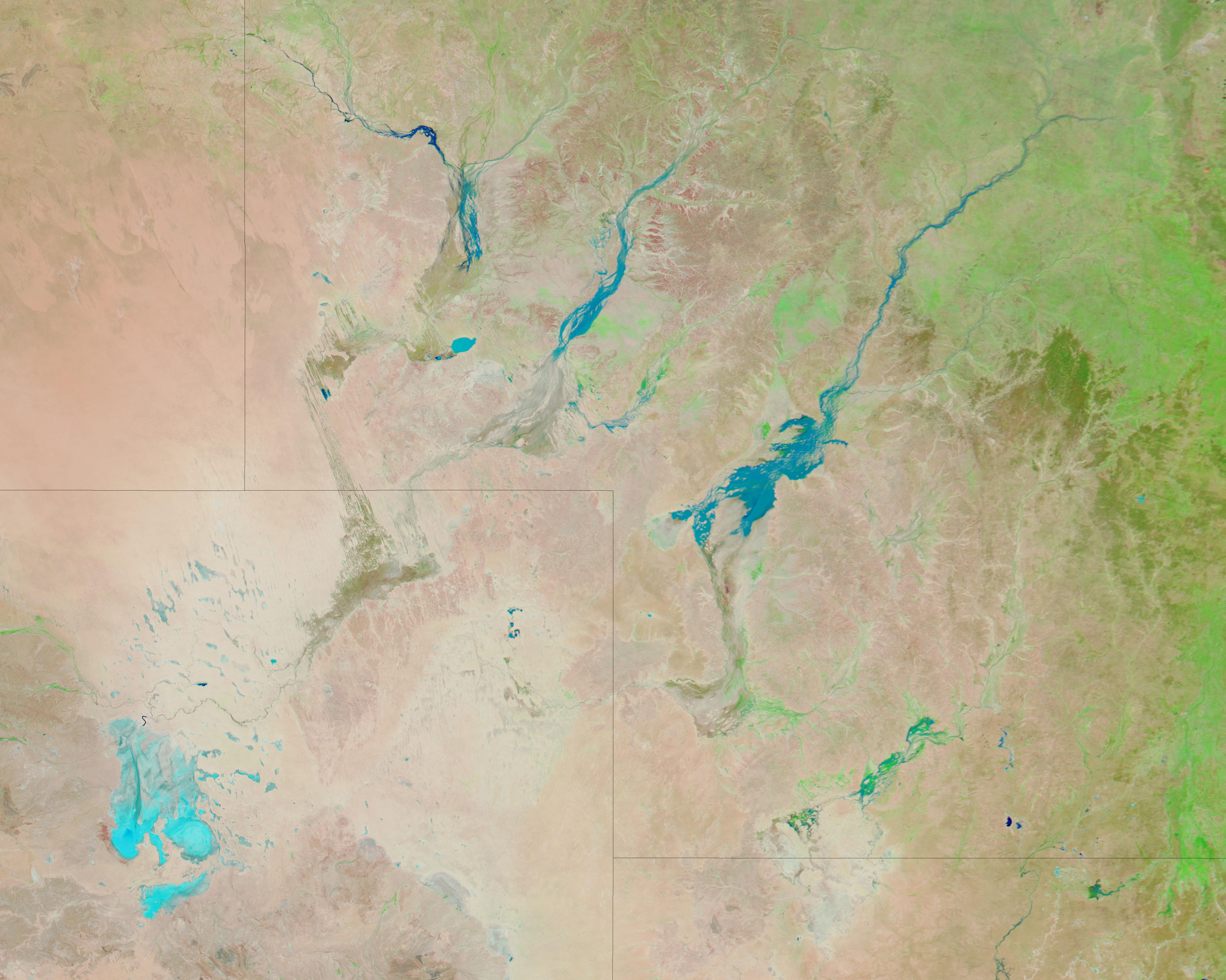
Satellite image of the channel country flooding taken by NASA

Tanbar, located on the Cooper Creek in the channel country of Western Queensland, was acquired by Paraway in 2016 from the Western Grazing Company and covers just over 1 million hectares. Due to its channel country location, a significant portion of the property is flooded by the Cooper Creek each year which then feeds into the transient Lake Yamma Yamma, thus providing the pastures with a form of natural irrigation

The acquisition of Tanbar substantially added to Paraway's growing capacity and was seen as a significant developmental step in terms of expanding its grass finishing capacity. It also allowed for the streamlining of the Company's breeding location and capacity with the combined purchase of Rocklands, an almost 680 000 hectare breeding property on the Barkly Tableland in Northwestern Queensland occurring at the same time. The incorporated purchase was rumoured to be worth between $130 million and $140 million.

==== Oxley ====
Oxley Station is a 35 000 hectare holding located on the Lower Macquarie River, approximately 75 km north of Warren, NSW. It was purchased by Paraway in 2011 and is located at the point where the river fans into natural wetlands (that account for nearly one third of the property's total area) known as the Macquarie Marshes, increasing its grazing potential as even during times of drought the marshes remain green.

The property began with the name "Ringorah" and became part of the Buttabone Pastoral Company in 1876. By 1924 this aggregation encompassed almost 97 000 hectares and Buttabone had become the largest freehold in the Macquarie Valley until it all went up for subdivision during auction later that year.

It is suggested that JJ Leahy acquired Oxley following Buttabone's dispersion as "throughout the 1940s, rural newspapers regularly ran articles highlighting the latest sale-yard triumph of Oxley-bred bullocks". So remarkable was Leahy's breeding that from January 8 to May 2, his stock who were sold under the name "J.J. Leahy", secured top prices for steers and bullocks, twenty times with his cows, heifers and dealers topping the market on five other occasions.

Oxley was sold in 1949, remaining JJ's cattle breeding base until this time. After JJ Leahy died in 1959, his son Keith bought Ringorah South but the main Oxley property was purchased by Berawinnia Pastoral Company, a joint venture of the Crawford, Moxham and Stalley families. In 1969 Berawinnia was bought ad lib by British American Tobacco Australia as part of its diversification strategy. This enterprise was later called Amatil and thus Oxley became part of Amatil's Naroo Pastoral Company.

Following successive crises in both the wool and cattle markets, Amatil decided to divest its pastoral portfolio and Oxley along with several other Naroo properties was purchased by Argentinian John D Kahlbetzer's Twynam Pastoral Company in 1979. In 1984 Twynam also bought Keith Leahy's Ringorah South subdivision allowing them to rebuild the original Ringorah holdings to its 1937 dimensions.

In 1998 Oxley was bought by Clyde Agriculture, an agricultural production and land management company, a purchase the corporation had coveted for some time. After a run of good years early on, the 2000s drought hit Oxley hard as it received next to no flooding from 2001 to 2007 and in the following years, Clyde began to reduce its pastoral investment. In 2011 Oxley was bought by Paraway in a "bulk deal worth close to $50 million".

=== Sheep ===
Paraway began its sheep breeding and growing enterprises in 2007 with its purchase of Pooginook, an iconic sheep stud in the Riverina region of NSW. From this initial purchase Paraway has added sheep farming properties in Central and Southern NSW as well as Victoria to accommodate a flock of up to 240 000 head. This flock produces over 1.46 million kilograms of wool each year and sells 120 000 head of sheep to both processors and restockers.

==== Pooginook Station ====
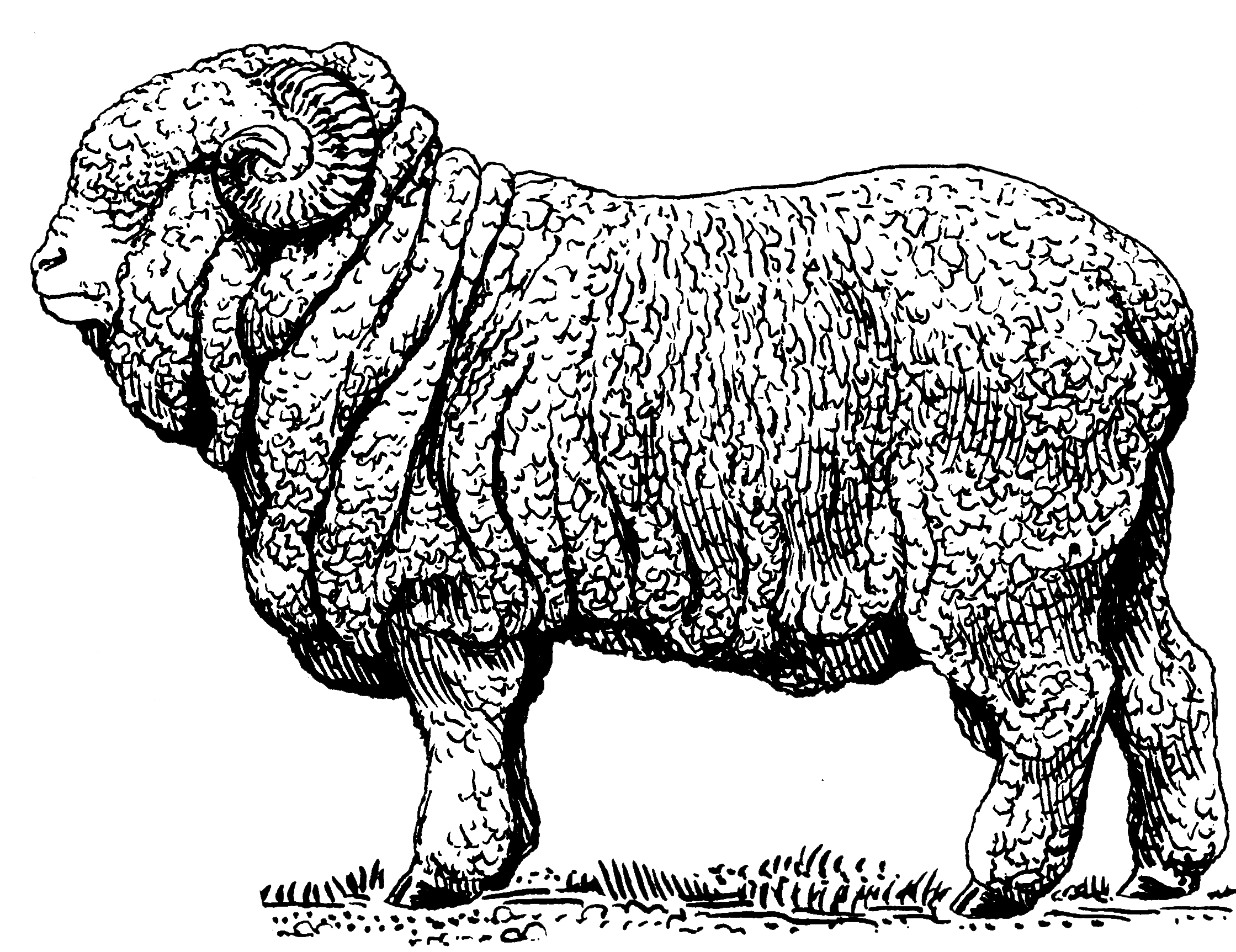
Merino sheep

Pooginook Station, is an historic Merino stud made up of almost 20 000 hectares of native and irrigated grazing land in the Riverina Region of NSW, and was Paraway's first purchase when it was formed in 2007. As a result of its specific husbandry practices, careful selection and continual benchmarking, Pooginook aims to set the standard for high quality stud and commercial sheep. They host an annual ram sale on the last Tuesday of September each year where both their Merino and Poll rams are auctioned. Semen is also available for sale from Pooginook special stud sires Pooginook is a member of the NSW Stud Merino Breeders Association.

The ram breeding enterprise that began as the foundation of what is Pooginook today was established by the Culley and Taylor Partnership in 1912 as Yoorooga Merino Stud at Jerilderie. The base of the breeding ewes came from Wanganella and the rams from Murga. When the partnership dissolved in 1937, Pooginook Stud was formed with half of the stud sheep and Wonga Stud was formed with the other half. The Pooginook Stud stock that have descended from Yoorooga's original flock is what Paraway purchased in 2007.

=== Cropping ===
As an addition to its sheep and cattle operations, Paraway has dryland cropping area totally over 20 000 hectares as well as 2 500 hectares of irrigated cropping. This land produces a variety of cereal crops, legumes, rice and cotton. Paraway retains a significant amount of the grain and hay it produces to use in its livestock operations

== Properties ==
Source: .

As at July 2025, Paraway owns 4.48 million hectares (11 million acres), and a total of 35 properties across Queensland, New South Wales and Victoria. The properties are listed below in alphabetical order and with details about their size, region and property type as well as when they were purchased by Paraway.

Station	Region	Land size (ha)	Property type	Staff	Year purchased
Aberbaldie	Central	3 894	Cattle breeding and finishing	3	2016
Armraynald	Northern	214 090	Cattle breeding	11	2009
Barton	Southern	8 244	Sheep and cattle breeding	7	2018
Beckworth Court	Southern	3024	Sheep and cattle finishing	3	2016
Borambil	Southern	14 442	Merino sheep breeding, cattle backgrounding and cropping	4	2008
Burindi	Central	11 000	Cattle breeding and opportunity fattening	4	2008
Burmah	Central	4 187ha	Finishing	3	2016
Buttabone	Central	28 783	Cattle breeding and fattening	3	2010
Clonagh Station	Northern	214 270	Cattle fattening	17	2009
Cooinbil	Southern	89 040	Merino sheep breeding and cropping	5	2010
Davenport Downs	Northern	1 510 000	Cattle fattening	10	2009
Gregory Downs	Northern	266 425	Cattle breeding	15	2009
Malvern Hills	Northern	50 070	Cattle growing	3	2011
Merrimba	Central	19 097	Merino sheep breeding, cattle breeding and fattening	4	2011
Moira Runda	Central	4 855	Cattle finishing	2	2018
Mungadal	Southern	116 994	Merino sheep breeding, prime lamb production and cropping	4	2010
Newstead	Central	4 964	Finishing	2	2016
Old Bundemar	Central	22 370	Sheep and cropping	6	2018
Oxley	Central	35 249	Angus cattle breeding and fattening	3	2011
Paradise	Central	6 434	Finishing	2	2016
Pier Pier	Central	31 603	Sheep breeding, cattle fattening and cropping	3	2011
Pooginook Station	Southern	19 656	Stud merino sheep breeding and cropping	4	2007
Rocklands	Northern	677 964	Cattle breeding	25	2016
Steam Plains	Southern	46 395	Merino sheep breeding, prime lamb production, cattle backgrounding and cropping	4	2008
Tanbar	Northern	1 021 904	Cattle growing	14	2016
The Bulls Run	Southern	6 880	Mixed farming	4	2007
Urawilkie	Central	25 944	Cattle and wheat	8	2018
