= Bailed Up =

Painting by Tom Roberts

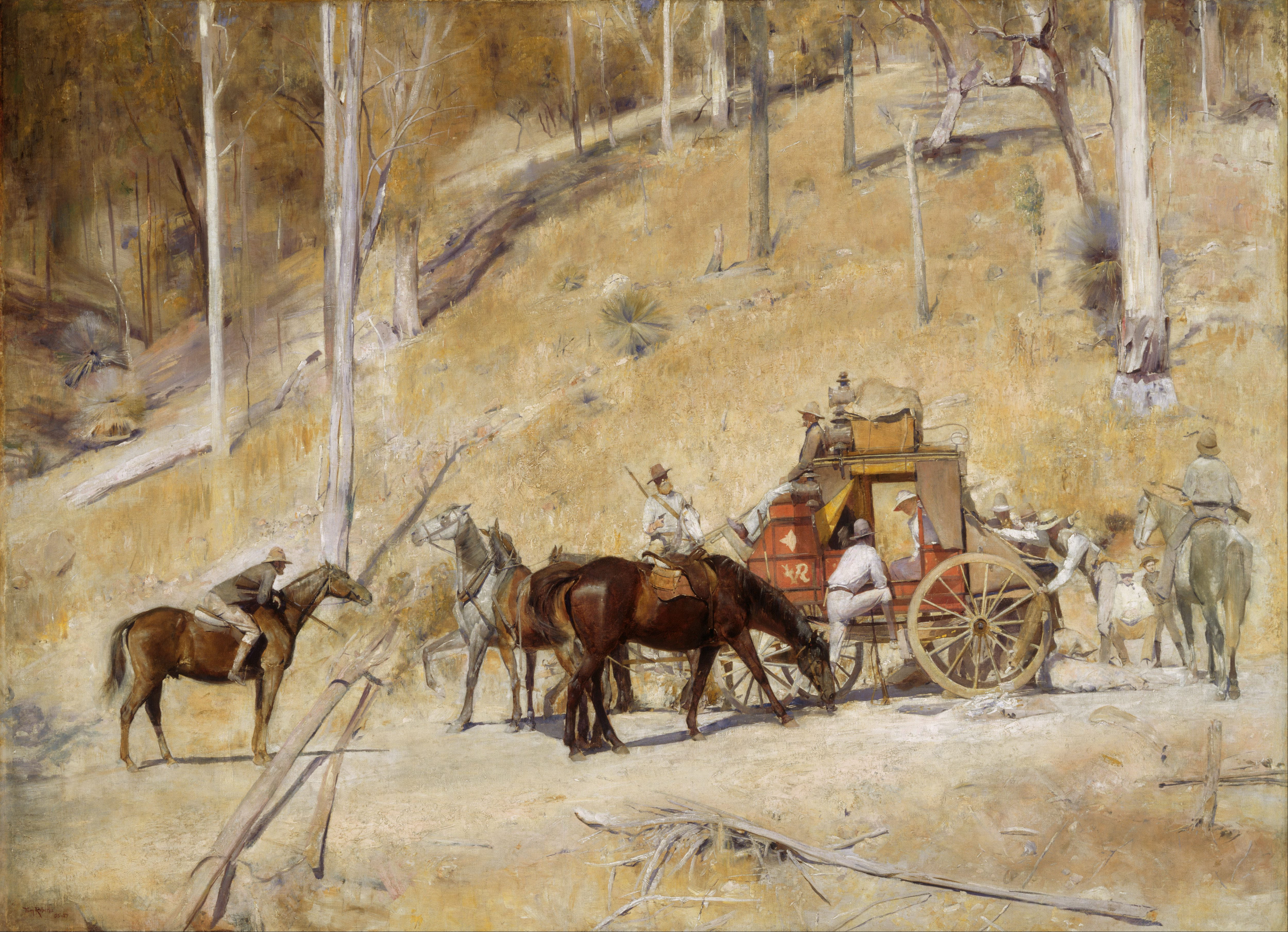
- Artist: Tom Roberts
- Year: 1895
- Medium: oil on canvas
- Dimensions: 134.5 cm × 182.8 cm (53.0 in × 72.0 in)
- Location: Art Gallery of New South Wales, Sydney

Bailed Up is an 1895 painting by Australian artist Tom Roberts. The painting depicts a stage coach being held up by bushrangers in an isolated, forested section of a back road. The painting is part of the collection of the Art Gallery of New South Wales. and has been described by one former Senior Curator as "the greatest Australian landscape ever painted".

== Composition ==
Roberts painted the work while staying at Newstead sheep station—near Inverell, New South Wales—owned by his friend Duncan Anderson. He had earlier painted The Golden Fleece, his second painting depicting sheep shearing, while at Newstead. The notorious bushranger Captain Thunderbolt had been active in the Inverell area more than twenty five years earlier and Roberts conceived an idea of painting a bushranging scene.

Roberts found his location for the painting along the road between Newstead and Paradise, a neighbouring station. The location was remote, on a flat bend on an uphill stretch of the road, surrounded by "grass trees and a forest of tall gums." At this spot Roberts, with assistance from the Anderson family, constructed a viewing platform in a tree growing on the slope below the road, thus setting himself up at road level. Roberts painted the Cobb and Co coach in Inverell and modelled the characters in the painting on people in Inverell and station hands at Newstead. Before starting on the main canvas Roberts "made tiny drawings and an oil sketch of how he wanted the scene to look."

== Reception ==
Once complete, Roberts exhibited Bailed Up in Sydney and Melbourne. Critical reception to the work was mixed; with comment in the press about "the way the legs of the men, or the skin of the horses had been depicted" among other things. Pearce considered that "[p]erhaps unsatisfactory pictorial resolution was sensed" by collectors. Regardless, for a thirty-year period the painting failed to find a buyer. Roberts reduced his asking price from £275 to 75 guineas in 1900 but still no buyer could be found.

In 1927, Roberts reworked the painting and the extent of this rework has been difficult to ascertain. Using X-ray photography, art historians now think that Roberts simplified the work considerably, making it flatter and more abstract, in the modernist style that had come into vogue at that time. The painting was finally sold for 500 guineas in 1928, purchased by a Sydney solicitor, J. W. Maund. Maund was also a trustee of the Art Gallery of New South Wales and he immediately lent the painting to the gallery—selling it to them five years later.

En route to an exhibition in Melbourne in 1956—part of the cultural program of the 1956 Summer Olympics— the painting fell off the back of a truck. The painting was damaged but successfully restored.

== Cultural references ==
Australian artist Ben Quilty reworked Bailed Up in his 2004 painting Gold Soil Wealth for Toil. It was acquired by the Art Gallery of New South Wales.

== See also ==
- List of paintings by Tom Roberts
