= Barkly Homestead =

Place in the Northern Territory, Australia

Barkly Homestead Tablelands, Northern Territory
- Coordinates: 19°42′40″S 135°49′36″E
- Postcode(s): 0862
- Elevation: 183 m (600 ft)
- Location: 210 km (130 mi) East of Tennant Creek; 420 km (261 mi) West of Mount Isa
| Mean max temp | Mean min temp | Annual rainfall |
| 37.3 °C; 99 °F | 12.2 °C; 54 °F | 118 mm 4.6 in |

Barkly Homestead is a roadhouse in the Northern Territory of Australia located on the Barkly Tableland. It is located near the intersection of the Barkly Highway and the Tablelands Highway between the Queensland Border town of Camooweal and the Northern Territory town of Tennant Creek. The roadhouse provides, fuel, meals, snacks, camping, motel, cabin, and powered caravan sites to travellers. It is the only stop between the Stuart Highway and the border of Queensland.
