= The Golden Fleece (painting) =

Painting by Tom Roberts

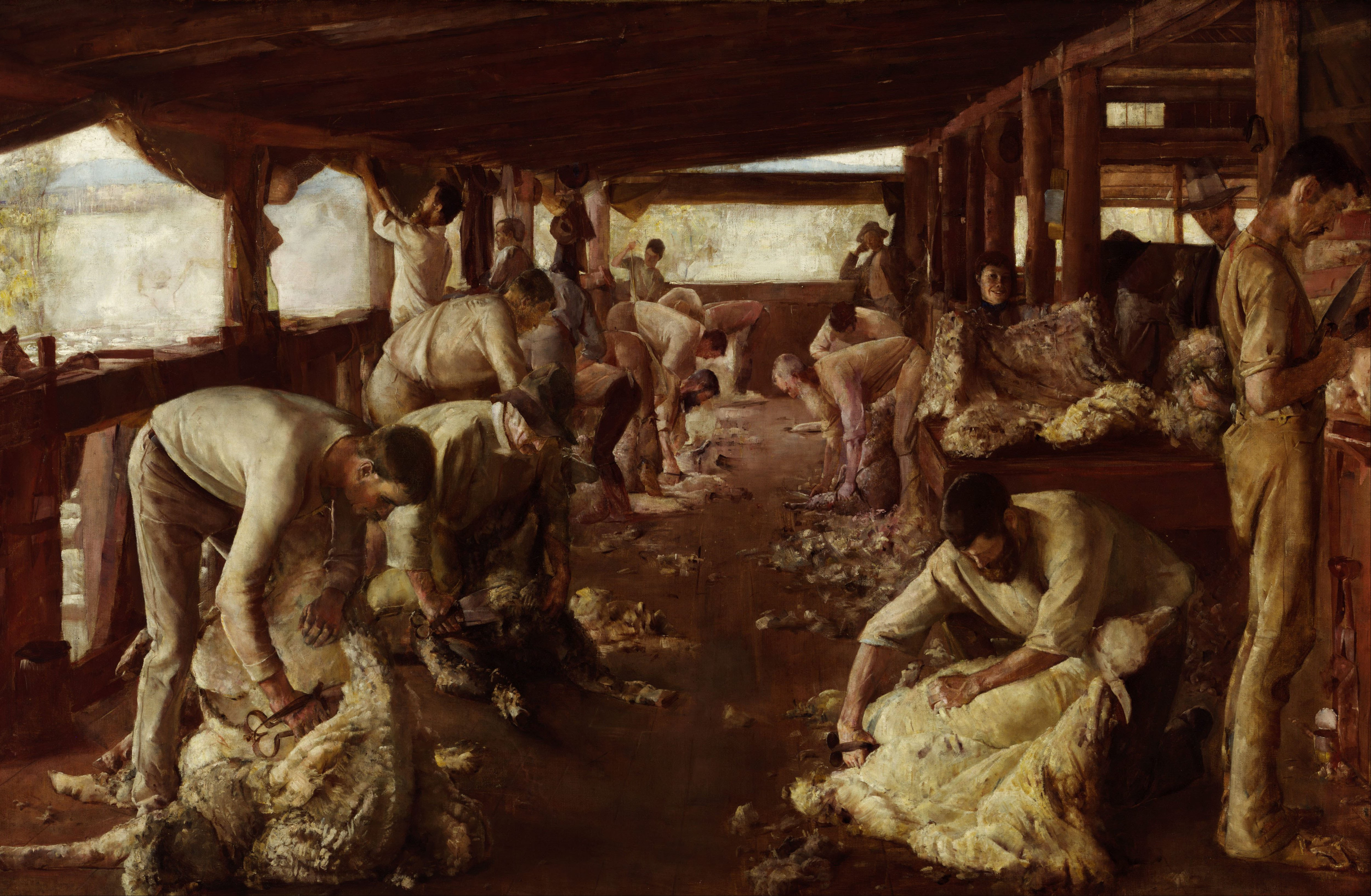
- Artist: Tom Roberts
- Year: 1894
- Medium: oil on canvas
- Dimensions: 104.0 cm × 158.7 cm (40.9 in × 62.5 in)
- Location: Art Gallery of New South Wales; Sydney

The Golden Fleece, originally known as Shearing at Newstead, is an 1894 painting by the Australian artist Tom Roberts. The painting depicts sheep shearers plying their trade in a timber shearing shed at Newstead North, a sheep station near Inverell on the Northern Tablelands of New South Wales. The same shed is depicted in another of Roberts' works, Shearing Shed, Newstead (1894).

The painting was originally titled Shearing at Newstead but was renamed The Golden Fleece after the Golden Fleece of Greek mythology to honour the wool industry and the nobility of the shearers. This was in keeping with Roberts' conscious idealisation of the Australian pastoral worker and landscape.

The painting, said to be "an icon of Australian art", is part of the collection of the Art Gallery of New South Wales.

== Composition ==
The Golden Fleece is an oil on canvas composition with 40.9 in × 62.5 in dimensions.

The image depicted in the painting shows the inside of an active, timber, open-aired shearing shed in Newstead New South Wales. It depicts sixteen male shearers, and one young boy, who are featured at work in the shearing station using traditional hand clippers to shear the sheep. Even for its time, the method of using these steel edged clippers for shearing was rather traditional and slightly outdated because as of the late 1880s, machine shearers were becoming increasingly popular in Australian shearing sheds. The scene is crowded and busy, capturing the typical working day inside the shearing station, with the timber floors covered in shorn wool and sheep being held in various positions.

The frame the painting is displayed in is attributed to the popular 19th-century carver John Thallon from Melbourne. It was restored in 2010.

== History ==
Roberts was born in Dorchester, England, in the year 1856. After the death of his father, Richard Roberts, he migrated to Melbourne, Australia, with his mother and two siblings in 1869. He began studying art at the Collingwood and Carlton artisans' schools of design in 1873 and in 1874 he joined the National Gallery School.

The Golden Fleece is the second sheep shearing themed painting in a series done by Tom Roberts. In 1890, four years prior to the painting of The Golden Fleece, Roberts expressed in a letter to The Argus, a Melbourne-based newspaper, his desire to create a shearing themed piece, writing: 'being in the bush and feeling the delight and fascination of the great pastoral life and work I have tried to express it’. This is the same year that he composed the piece of work which was titled Shearing the Rams. This painting depicted the inside of the shearing shed at Brockelsby a sheep station in the Riverina region of New South Wales. Roberts was living in Melbourne at the time of the composition. After the completion of the piece, the oil on canvas painting was exhibited in Roberts’ Collins street studio in Melbourne, and it was Roberts’ hope that he could sell it to the National Gallery of Victoria. There was demand for the painting to enter public galleries, as one Sydney corresponder writes "if our national gallery trustees were in the least patriotic, they would purchase it." However, there was opposition from key members in the gallery and it therefore was sold to a local stock agent named Edmund Trenchard who offered to buy it privately for 350 guineas. Roberts' intention was to pay homage to Australia's pastoral culture through his artwork. He said in reference to Shearing the Rams.

It seems to me that one of the best words spoken to an artist is "Paint what you love, and love what you paint," and on that I have worked: and so it came that being in the bush and feeling the delight and fascination of the great pastoral life and work I have tried to express it [...] So lying on wool-bales ... it seemed that I had there the best expression of my subject, a subject noble and worthy enough if I could express the meaning and spirit—of strong masculine labour, the patience of the animals whose year's growth is being stripped from them for man's use and the great human interest in the whole scene

— Tom Roberts, 1890,

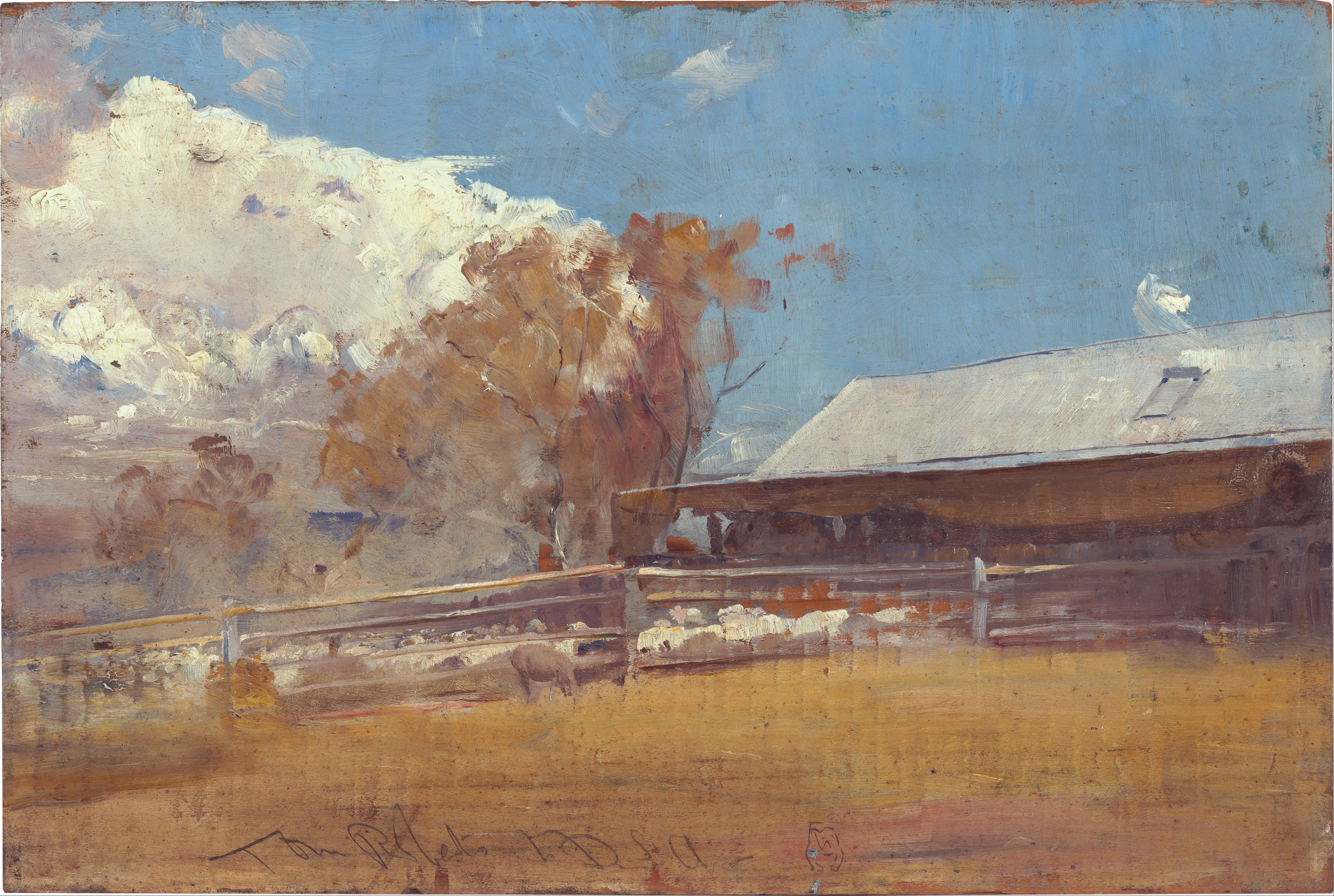
Roberts' painting Shearing shed, Newstead shows the exterior of the shed depicted in The Golden Fleece.

In 1891, a year after selling Shearing the Rams, Tom Roberts moved to Sydney. He was still disappointed that the first of his pastoral themed paintings had not being taken up by the National Art Gallery of Victoria and decided that he would begin a second work of a similar theme. It was in the year 1893 that he first visited the woolshed owned by his friend Duncan Anderson, the Newstead North Station, in northern New South Wales near Inverell. It was here that Roberts set up and painted 'en plein air' the second in his sheep shearing themed series of paintings, 'The Golden Fleece'. Roberts used live models who posed in the shearing shed for him to base the figures in the painting off, these models were the real employees of the shearing shed in Newstead, most of the models have since been identified and their names known by locals and family members in Inverell. The property featured in The Golden Fleece and Shearing Shed, Newstead is Newstead Station, now owned by Paraway Pastoral Company.

The owner and manager of the shed, Duncan Anderson, is also included in the painting, he is the non-labouring figure standing to the far left wearing a suit and a hat that shadows over his face. It took Roberts from February to May 1894, approximately 4 months, to complete the painting, after which it was exhibited in New South Wales at the Fifteenth Annual Exhibition of the Art Society of New South Wales at the York Street Skating Rink, in September 1894. The same year of its completion and exhibition, the painting was scouted and purchased by the Art Gallery of New South Wales where it can be seen today. Roberts painted 3 new artworks while staying at the Anderson family's station in Newport, including The Golden Fleece and other well known Australian Impressionist artworks such as Bailed Up and Shearing Shed, Newstead.

== Significance of the name ==
When Tom Roberts first composed the painting in 1894, it was titled and exhibited as Shearing at Newstead, however when it was purchased by the Art Gallery of New South Wales, Roberts presented it under the title of The Golden Fleece. The exact circumstances surrounding the changing of the name are unclear, however it is generally acknowledged that Dunkin Anderson, the owner of the sheep station, was the one who suggested the new title in reference to the ancient Greek myth of Jason and the quest for the Golden Fleece. This mythological story saw some of the greatest heroes of ancient Greek mythology on a quest to retrieve the valuable Golden Fleece which magical properties. The implications of the title is a reflection of Roberts' intention in creating the image of the rural worker as the 'Australian hero'. The Golden Fleece also has a uniquely Australian reference as the country was popularly referred to as ‘the land of the golden fleece’. This title was first coined by a well-known British journalist by the name of George Augustus Sala who referred to Australia as such. This name was granted to Australia in reference to the significance of the Australian sheep and wool industry and its gross contribution the country's economic state.

Australia is often expressed as being ‘built on’ or as ‘riding on a sheep’s back’ in allusion to the fact that wool was the source of the countries national prosperity throughout the later centuries. The wool and pastoral industry where largely significant in Australia throughout the 17th century and in the year 1870, Australia became the world's largest wool producer.

== Critical reaction ==
The Golden Fleece was well received by newspapers and critics at the time of its exhibition, and in 1895 it was named “the picture of the year” by the Sydney Morning Herald.

Modern art curators, critics and reporters maintain a positive attitude towards the painting. It is often referred to as “an icon of Australian art”. Writers still reflect upon the Impressionist elements and Roberts' ability to capture the atmosphere of the shearing shed. This is admired by Barry Pearce, the Curator of Australian Art at the Art Gallery of NSW, who states."You get the sense that you can smell the wool, you can feel the light and the dust. You’re absolutely there watching it happen."

Art researcher N. Lendon notes the artistic talent displayed by Roberts in The Golden Fleece by comparing the effect of his work to photography, he writes “Clearly the artist illustrator fulfilled a need for the imaginative, evocative, dramatic and even more romantic image which the photographer was unable to provide.”

The three sheep pictures show maleness and manual labour and celebrate the Australia that once 'rode on the sheep's back"

— Christopher Menz,

== See also ==
- List of paintings by Tom Roberts
- Shearing the Rams - an earlier work (1890) of Roberts depicting the same shearing theme.
- Bailed Up - A later work (1895) done during Roberts' stay at the Newstead Sheep Station
