= Walhallow Station =

Pastoral lease in the Northern Territory

Coordinates: 17.78395°S 135.66267°E

Location in Northern Territory

Walhallow Station, also once known as Walhallow Downs and often just referred to as Walhallow, is a pastoral lease that operates as a cattle station in the Northern Territory of Australia.

== Location ==
It is located about 227 kilometres (141 mi) north west of Elliott and 238 kilometres (148 mi) north east of Tennant Creek in the Northern Territory. Walhallow shares a boundary to the north with Mallapunyah Station, to the south and east with Cresswell Downs, and to the south and west with Anthony Lagoon.

== Description ==
Occupying an area of 9,970 square kilometres (3,849 sq mi) of open plains, Mitchell grass downs, coolabah woodland and spinifex desert situated on the Barkly Tableland. The station has a carrying capacity of 50,000 head of Brahman cattle. The neighbouring property to the south is Anthony Lagoon.

== History ==
The area lies on Kotandji land.

The first Europeans to explore the area were Ernest Favenc and Nathaniel Buchanan who conducted expeditions around the Barkly Tableland area in 1878.

The property was first settled by John Bassett and William Christian in 1881. Christian was still an owner of the station in 1907 when a mob of 1,325 cattle were droved to Springfield.

Walhallow was sold in 1913 along with all of the plant and stock to Messrs Cumming and Capper. The station was reported to have an area of approximately 2,500 square miles (6,475 km^{2}) at this time.

Very heavy rains fell in 1925 with the station recording 28 inches (711 mm) of rain in the first three months of the year. Borroloola on the McArthur River received an equivalent amount.

In 1929 an Aboriginal employee at the station, named Paddy, was murdered by two Caucasian employees, William John Everitt and William John Faulk. Paddy had stolen some sweet potatoes from the homestead garden and was confronted by Everitt. Paddy attacked Everitt and while they were wrestling Faulk pulled Paddy off and sent him back to camp with a kick. Paddy's body was found later beaten to death. Both Faulk and Everitt were charged with murder and taken to Darwin for trial.

Walhallow was once the headquarters of Peter Sherwin and the Sherwin Pastoral Company and was in his possession in 1987.

The station was purchased by Paraway Pastoral Company, funded by Macquarie Pastoral, in 2009 along with other Georgina Pastoral company and AACo. properties including Clonagh and Davenport Downs. Paraway still owned the property in 2012, under the management of Cameron Fulcher. The property is run in conjunction with Cresswell Downs.

== See also ==
- List of ranches and stations
- List of the largest stations in Australia
