= Calvert Hills Station =

Pastoral lease in the Northern Territory

Coordinates: 17.2314°S 137.3317°E

Location in the Northern Territory

Calvert Hills Station is a pastoral lease that operates as a cattle station in the Northern Territory of Australia. It occupies an area of about 4,814 square kilometres (1,859 sq mi).

It is situated about 169 kilometres (105 mi) south of Borroloola and 404 kilometres (251 mi) east of Elliott. Other pastoral leases surround the property including Wollogorang Station to the east, Pungalina-Seven Emu Sanctuary and the Garawa Aboriginal Land Trust to the north, Kiana to the west, Cresswell Downs to the south west and Benmarra and the Wanyi-Garawa Aboriginal Land Trust to the south.

In 1949 the property changed ownership when Camp and MacIntosh acquired it from the estate of J. Clarke.

Alex Chapple, an American, acquired the property prior to 1996. He employed Paul Edmonds as manager who convinced him to hold onto the station. The property was mostly under developed at this stage and had also been destocked to eradicate brucellosis and tuberculosis.

The station was listed in 2013 along with at least 15 others following the live export ban to Indonesia. It sold later in the same year to the McMillan Pastoral Company when it was stocked with 15,000 head of cattle for A$15 million.

== See also ==
- List of ranches and stations
