= Mallapunyah =

Pastoral lease in Northern Territory,

Coordinates: 16°57′58″S 135°46′41″E

Location in the Northern Territory

Mallapunyah Springs Station, often referred to as Mallapunyah, is a pastoral lease that operates as a cattle station in the Northern Territory of Australia.

It is situated about 113 kilometres (70 mi) south east of Borroloola and 730 kilometres (454 mi) south east of Darwin. Mallapunyah Creek runs through the property. Mallapunyah shares a boundary with Walhallow Station to the south, Kiana and McArthur River Stations to the east and the Mambalya Rrumburriya Wuyaliya Aboriginal Land Trust property to the north and west. Both the Tablelands Highway and the Borroloola Stock route bisect the property.

The area was settled in the mid-1920s by George and Elizabeth Darcy. When they initially settled the property George worked away to earn money for the family while Elizabeth built the homestead and the furniture and taught the twelve children. Elizabeth went missing on the 4,077-square-kilometre (1,574 sq mi) property in October 1944 while looking for stray donkeys. A search was mounted but she was never found.

== See also ==
- List of ranches and stations
