= Mittiebah Station =

Pastoral lease in the Northern Territory

Coordinates: 18.80299°S 137.08708°E

Location in Northern Territory

Mittiebah Station, mostly referred to as Mittiebah, is a pastoral lease operating as a cattle station in the Northern Territory of Australia.

Mittiebah Station is located about 318 kilometres (198 mi) east of Tennant Creek and 285 kilometres (177 mi) north west of Camooweal (Queensland), in the Northern Territory. The property shares a boundary to the south with Alexandria Station, to the west with Brunette Downs Station, to the north with Benmarra Station and to the east with both Mount Drummond Station and Waanyi-Garawa Aboriginal Land Trust.

The station occupies an area of 6,955 square kilometres (2,685 sq mi) on the Barkly Tableland. The Playford River runs through the property, which encompasses a wide range of types from Rangeland to open plains of Mitchell grass. Mount Morgan is on the property.

As of September 2019 the station is owned by the North Australian Pastoral Company (NAPCo), which acquired the property in 2001. The station had already been owned by the company once before when it was part of Alexandria Station, before being resumed by the Northern Territory Government in 1965.

== See also ==
- List of ranches and stations
- List of the largest stations in Australia
