= Stanbroke Pastoral Company =

Australian pastoral company

Stanbroke Pastoral Company was created by Frederick Augustus Allen (1880-1972) in the early 1930s who then sold to AMP Limited around 1964 as they went and bought many large pastoral properties around the country.

Established in about 1964, by 2003 the company owned 27 cattle stations in Queensland and the Northern Territory controlling some 1,160,000 square kilometres (447,879 sq mi) of pastoral country.

Properties owned by Stanbroke included; Augustus Downs, Davenport Downs and Tanbar Stations and in Queensland and Banka Banka, Brunchilly, Lake Nash and Helen Springs Station in the Northern Territory.

The company was purchased in 2004 by the Nebo Group, which paid A$417.5 million plus taking on outstanding debts. The sale was by far the largest rural transaction in Australia's history and included a herd of approximately 5,000,000 cattle. The Nebo group was a consortium made up of Jack Cowin, the founder of Hungry Jack's; the nation's largest potato grower, Peter Menegazzo; and five prominent pastoral families led by the Fredericks family. The syndicate fell apart later the same year leaving Menegazzo in charge of the entire business. Menegazzo bought out his fellow investors for an estimated A$340 million.

On 2 December 2005, Menegazzo and his wife Angela were killed when the light aircraft they were in broke up in mid-air in central New South Wales, leaving their four children Brendan, Mark, Deborah and David in charge of the business. Under the four siblings, the company now operates entirely within Queensland, with six Gulf Country stations including Augustus Downs carrying some 200,000 cattle; exporting beef to more than thirty countries.

On 16 October 2025, Stanbroke acquired the Rangers Valley beef brand and operations from Marubeni.
