= Anthony Lagoon =

Pastoral lease in the Northern Territory

Coordinates: 17.978°S 135.533°E

Location in Northern Territory

Anthony Lagoon is a cattle station on the Barkly Tableland in the Northern Territory, Australia. It is situated approximately 215 kilometres (134 mi) east of Elliott and 227 kilometres (141 mi) south of Borroloola. Eva Downs is run as an outstation of Anthony Lagoon and employs a separate manager, but is part of the same operation.

== Description ==
The station when combined with neighbouring Eva Downs occupies an area of 9,349 square kilometres (3,610 sq mi) and has a carrying capacity of approximately 60,000 head of Brahman cattle. The station is situated about 1,000 kilometres (621 mi) from Darwin so the majority of stock are trucked out for live export, generally to South East Asia. The neighbouring property to the north is Walhallow Station.

The station contains black soil plains covered in Mitchell grass and Flinders grasses and red soil country dominated by spinifex, saltbush and other herbage. The flooded lake country around the permanent water sources support stands of coolibah, Lignum, Bluebush, Verbine and tussock grassland.

== History ==
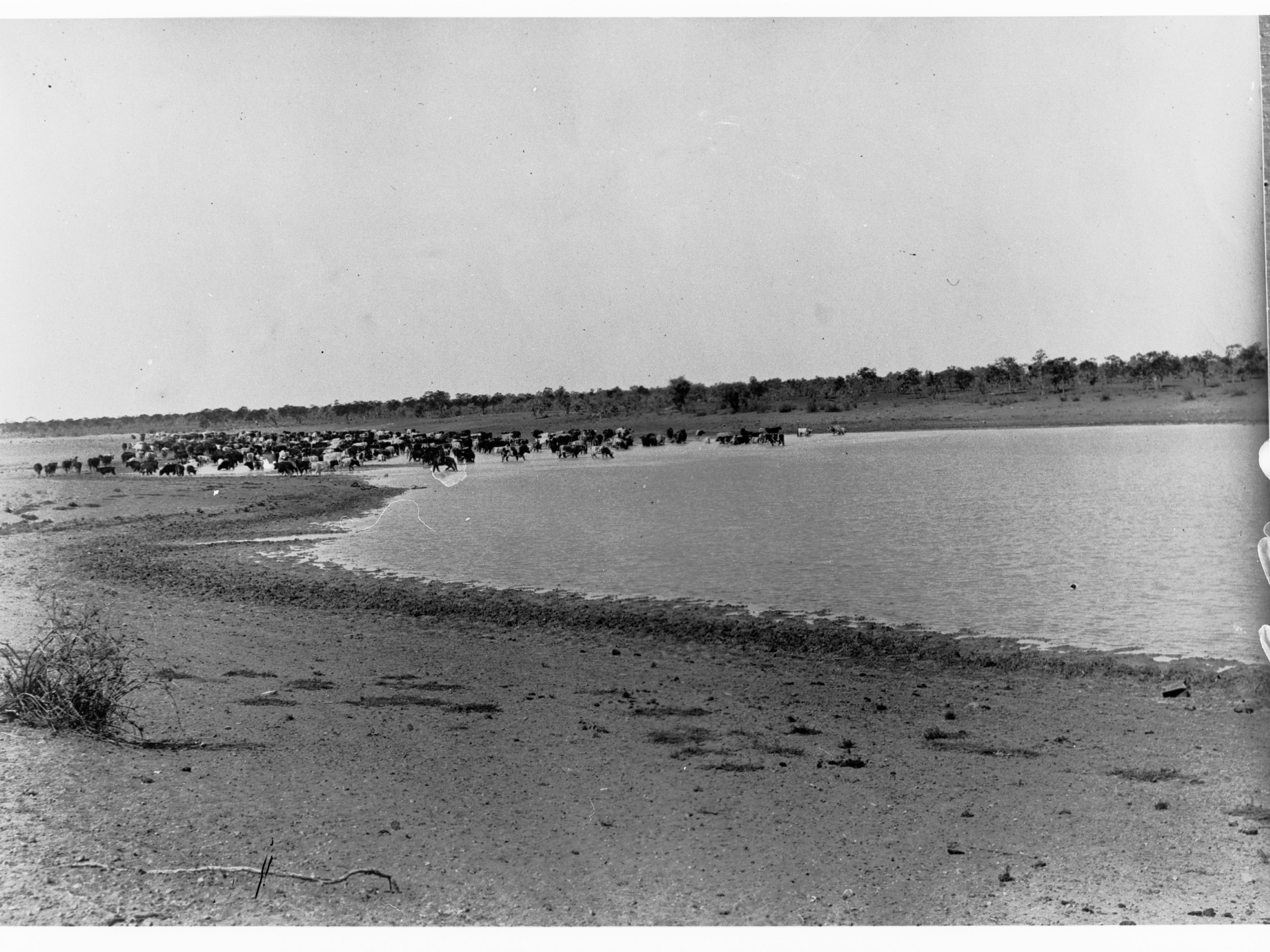
Cattle at Anthony Lagoon, c. 1905

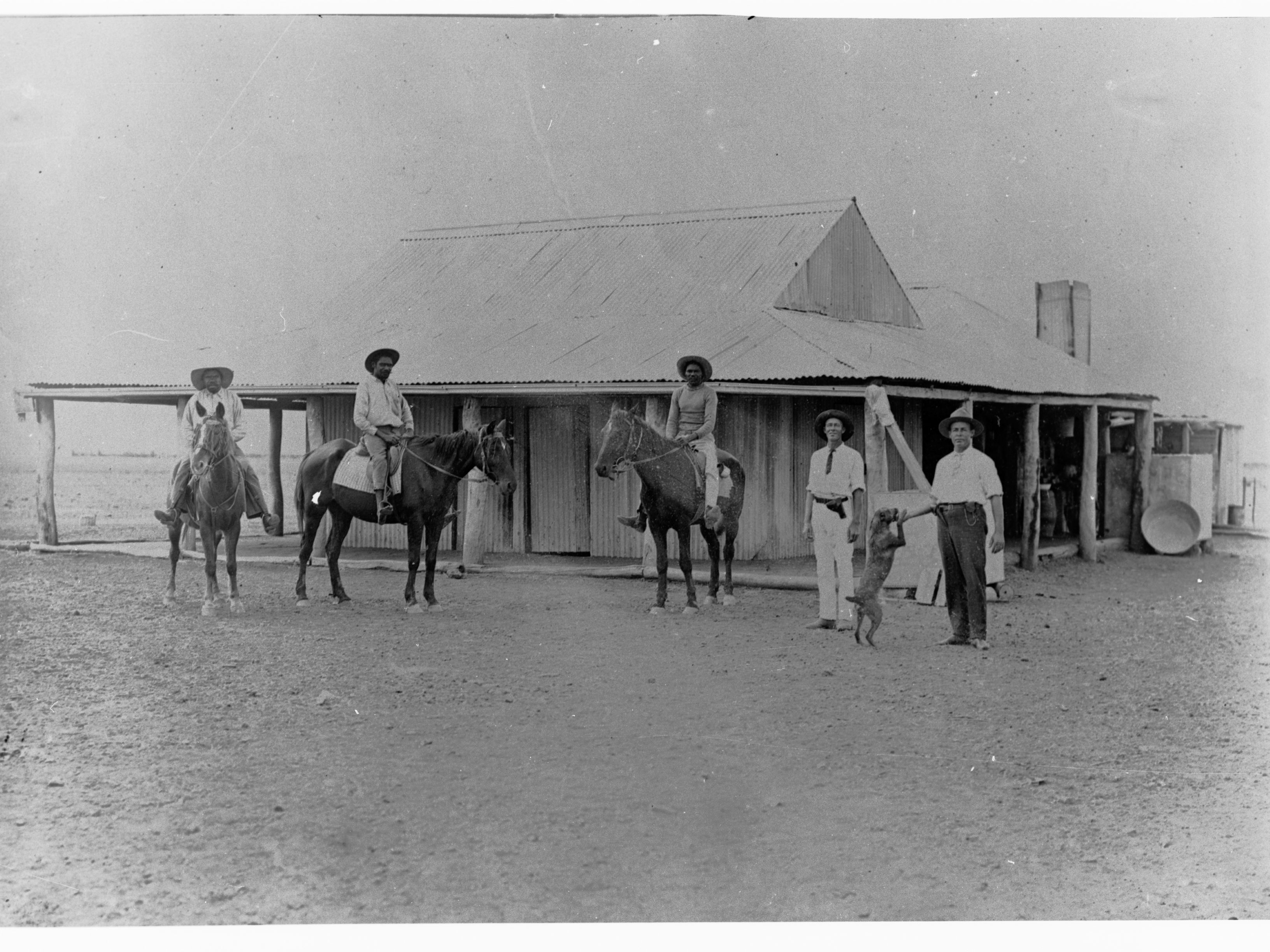
Cattlemen on horses in front of Anthony Lagoon Police Station, c. 1905

The property named after a permanent lagoon on the Cresswell Creek, discovered by Ernest Favenc in 1878. It became a watering hole for cattle stock being moved from the Kimberleys to Queensland. A police station was established here in 1895 to keep a watch over the cattle passing through the area. This was absorbed into the Avon Downs Police District in 1982.

Mr O. Wales of McLeod, Hunt and Company opened a general store at Anthony Lagoon in 1889.

Flooding occurred in 1891 when the rivers rose and the police station was submerged under 3 feet (1 m) of water.

The station was inundated with heavy rainfall in January and February during the monsoon of 1895, the police station and post office both had 8 feet (2 m) and Loxton' store had about 7 feet (2 m), which was 3 feet (1 m) higher than any flood previously experienced. More floods occurred in 1901 when the waters in the creek were over 1 mile (2 km) wide and running very so quickly that it was too dangerous to even attempt a crossing.

The station is mentioned as a postal delivery point in chapter 12 of the novel We of the Never Never by Aeneas Gunn published in 1908.

The Anthony's Lagoon Pastoral Company was established in 1929 with capital of £100,000. At this point the property had an area of 1,054 square miles (2,730 km^{2}) with a lease that would not expire until 1965. The first directors were James Malcolm Newman, A.J. Cotton, V.R. Cotton and B.T. Crawford.

In 1935 the property was owned by Mr. J. M. Newman, an engineer, who had other pastoral interests including the Cabulcha stud farm in Queensland used to breed bulls for use in his Territory herds. Newman still owned the station in 1948

The property was sold to the Scottish Australian Company in 1949. At this time the station had an area of 1,800 square miles (4,662 km^{2}) and about 12,000 head of cattle that were included in the deal. The Company introduced Shorthorn cattle to Anthony Lagoon as they had to their other Territory property, Austral Downs. The shorthorns were replacing the Aberdeen Angus herd which the campany found had fattened so well at Austral.

In 2006, Anthony Lagoon and Eva Downs stations were both sold by the current owner, Heytesbury, to Australian Agricultural Company. The airport code for Anthony Lagoon is AYL.

Several small parcels of land on the station were declared heritage areas by the state government in 2008, these included the Anthony Lagoon Davey Paxman Steam Engine, the 1906 cattle dip, the 1945 cattle dip and Police Tracker's Quarters and Gaol.

== See also ==
- List of ranches and stations
- List of the largest stations in Australia
