= Tablelands Highway =

Highway in the Northern Territory

Tablelands Highway Northern Territory
- Tablelands Highway (depicted in blue)

General information
- Type: Highway
- Length: 375 km (233 mi)
- Route number(s): State Route 11

Major junctions
- North end: Carpentaria Highway, Balbirini, Northern Territory
- Eva Downs-Anthony Lagoon Road
- South end: Barkly Highway, Barkly Homestead Roadhouse

Location(s)
- Major settlements: Mallapunyah. Walhallow Station, Anthony Lagoon, Brunette Downs

Highway system
- Highways in Australia; National Highway • Freeways in Australia; Highways in the Northern Territory

The Tablelands Highway is a 375 kilometre single lane sealed road in the Northern Territory, Australia. It runs from Barkly Homestead on the Barkly Highway to Cape Crawford near Borroloola on the Carpentaria Highway.

== Upgrades ==
The Northern Australia Beef Roads Program announced in 2016 included the following project for the Tablelands Highway.

=== Road upgrading ===
The project to upgrade selected sections to a two-lane sealed standard was completed in mid 2020 at a total cost of $25 million.

== See also ==
- Highways in Australia
- List of highways in the Northern Territory
