= Playford River (Northern Territory) =

River in Northern Territory, Australia

Coordinates: 19°03′S 136°42′E

Playford River is a river in the Northern Territory of Australia and has a length of 406 km. The river originates near the base of Mount Morgan then flows in a southerly direction before veering west and eventually discharging into Lake De Burgh. The Playford has three tributaries: Buchanan Creek, Desert Creek and Eastern Creek—as well as a number of permanent waterholes. These include Tobacco waterhole, Ibis waterhole, Upper and Lower Amazon Lagoon and Xmas megahole.

The homestead for the second largest station in Australia, Alexandria Station is situated near the eastern end of the river.

== See also ==
- List of rivers of Australia § Northern Territory
