= Alexandria Station (Northern Territory) =

Cattle station and pastoral lease in the Northern Territory

Coordinates: 19°03′28″S 136°42′28″E

Location in Northern Territory

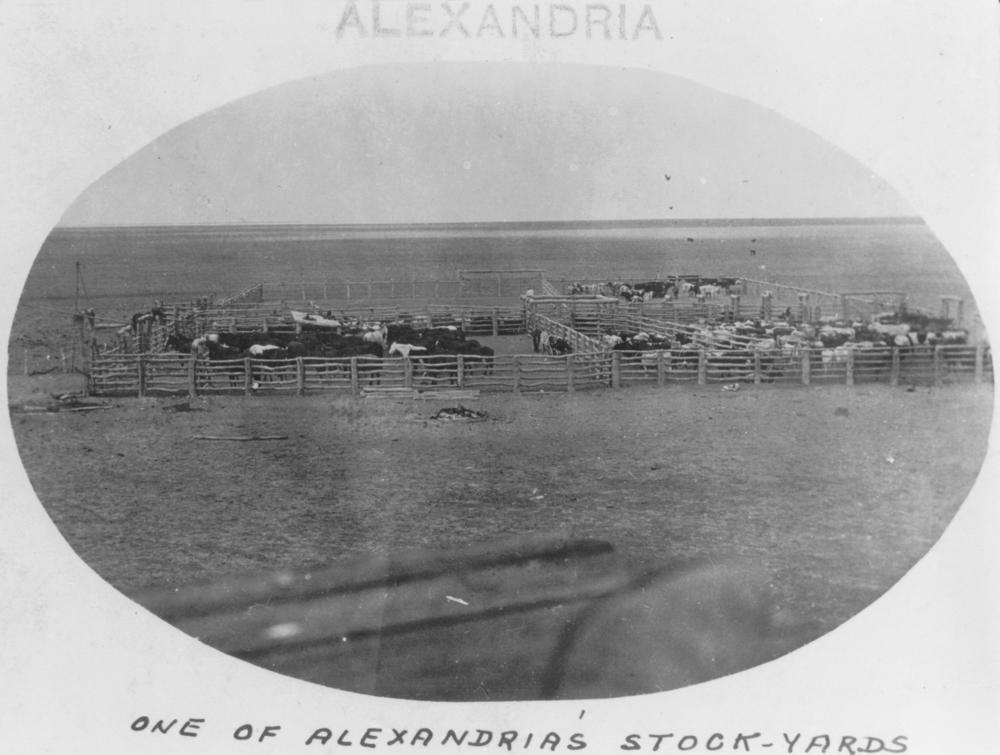
One of the stockyards on Alexandria Station, c. 1921

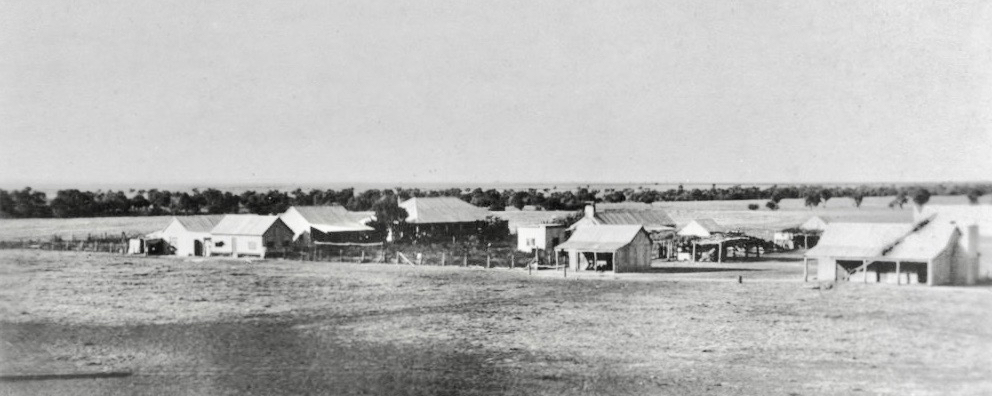
Alexandria Station, homestead and outbuildings, in 1921

Alexandria Station is a pastoral lease that operates as a cattle station. It is the Northern Territory's largest pastoral property and Australia's third largest pastoral property, after Anna Creek station and Clifton Hills Station.

== Location ==
It is located about 173 kilometres (107 mi) north west of Camooweal and 273 kilometres (170 mi) east of Tennant Creek in the Northern Territory. Alexandria shares a boundary to the west with Alroy Downs and Brunette Downs Station, to the north with Mittiebah and Mount Drummond Station, to the south with West Ranken, East Ranken, Adder and Rocklands Stations and to the east with the Queensland border. Several ephemeral waterway cross the property including the Buchanan river, Ranken River, Buchanan Creek, Cigarette Hole Creek and other smaller tributaries. The South Barkly Stock Route crosses the property at the south west corner.

== Description ==
Occupying an area of 16,116 square kilometres (6,222 sq mi) of open plains, floodplain and wooded sandhills, it is situated on the Barkly Tableland and was established prior to 1877.

The station is currently one of 15 properties owned by the North Australian Pastoral Company (NAPCo), who has owned it since 1877, making Alexandria NAPCos oldest and largest property. The plains are covered with Mitchell grass that supports a herd of about 55,000 cattle and allow the owners to harvest some 10,000 bales of hay per annum for use on other properties in the group. Alexandria shares a boundary with Mittiebah Station, another NAPCo property.

50 employees live on the station, with the main homestead being situated close to the Playford River. Two outstations are found on the property; Soudan is along the Rankin River and Gallipoli is on the eastern side of the lease.

Initially Alexandria used to run Shorthorn cattle but in 1982 the decision was made that Brahman would be more suitable for the harsh environment, particularly the heat and ticks. Since then Belmont and Charbray cattle have been added to the herd.

== History ==
Waanyi (also known as Wanyi, Wanyee, Wanee, Waangyee, Wonyee, Garawa, and Wanji) is an Australian Aboriginal language of the Gulf Country. The language region includes the western parts of Lawn Hill Creek and Nicholson River, from about the boundary between the Northern Territory and Queensland, westwards towards Alexandria Station, Doomadgee, and Nicholson River. It includes the local government area of the Aboriginal Shire of Doomadgee.

A murder was committed at the station in 1885 when a station hand named Ross was killed, apparently by an axe-wielding assailant, while he was returning to his camp after spending the day sinking a well. Ross's colleagues, who said they were not with him when he was killed but heard his cries, told the press that the assailant had been one of a group of Aboriginal people who were camped relatively close by, and who must have stolen the murder weapon earlier. Ross's colleagues also said they'd gone looking for the unknown murderer(s) the next day, but couldn't find them. Another man named John Corbett died at the station in the same year when the dynamite he was using to deepen a well exploded prematurely causing him to fall to the bottom. He later died of shock and his other injuries.

Heavy flooding occurred in the area about the station during the monsoon of 1895. Alexandria received 17 inches (432 mm) of rain in January 1895.

In 1901 the area had the best rains since 1894 with 17 inches (432 mm) falling over 4 days that April. Drought followed the next year with the station's bores also running dry despite being sunk to a depth of 400 feet (122 m)

The cattle king, Sidney Kidman, announced in 1907 that he would be purchasing all the male cattle produced on the station for the next three years. Kidman expected a total of between 9,000 and 10,000 head of cattle to be acquired.

Stock had to be quarantined in an area of 10 square miles (26 km^{2}) around Borrodo waterhole in 1918 following an outbreak of red-water amongst cattle that were travelling to Brunette Downs Station.

By 1923 the size of the property was estimated at 10,500 square miles (27,195 km^{2}) and was the second largest run in the Northern Territory after Victoria River Downs, which occupied 13,100 square miles (33,929 km^{2}).

Periodic flooding is a way of life in Alexandria, with both the Playford and Rankin rivers breaking their banks. In 1939 over 6 inches (152 mm) of rain fell over the course of two days during the wet season. At the time Alexandria had no boat and a passenger who had arrived by plane had to be ferried across the Playford in a bathtub.

Peter Sherwin was a jackaroo at Alexandria in 1946 when he was 16 years old; he remained here for six years before leaving to Helen Springs Station. Sherwin later purchased a string of properties including Victoria River Downs Station in 1986.

Alexandria and the rest of the Tablelands were struck by drought in 1952, which was eventually broken by heavy falls in May of that year. The station had an estimated size of 11,000 square miles (28,490 km^{2}) at the time and was "recognised as being one of the best developed and most keenly husbanded property in the north".

In 1955, Alexandria and other stations in the surrounding area were victims of the largest cattle duffing ring since the war years. The duffers were caught after several months of tracking down the stolen beasts in hidden gullies around the area. A special court was set up at Alexandria to hear the charges.

Much of the station was left underwater following heavy rains in 2009 and 2012 where flooding turned the area into an inland sea.

== See also ==
- List of ranches and stations
- List of the largest stations in Australia
- List of pastoral leases in the Northern Territory
