= Ernest Favenc =

Australian explorer, journalist, historian and writer

- Born: 21 October 1845; Walworth, Surrey, England
- Died: 14 November 1908 (aged 63); Sydney, Australia
- Occupations: Explorer and author

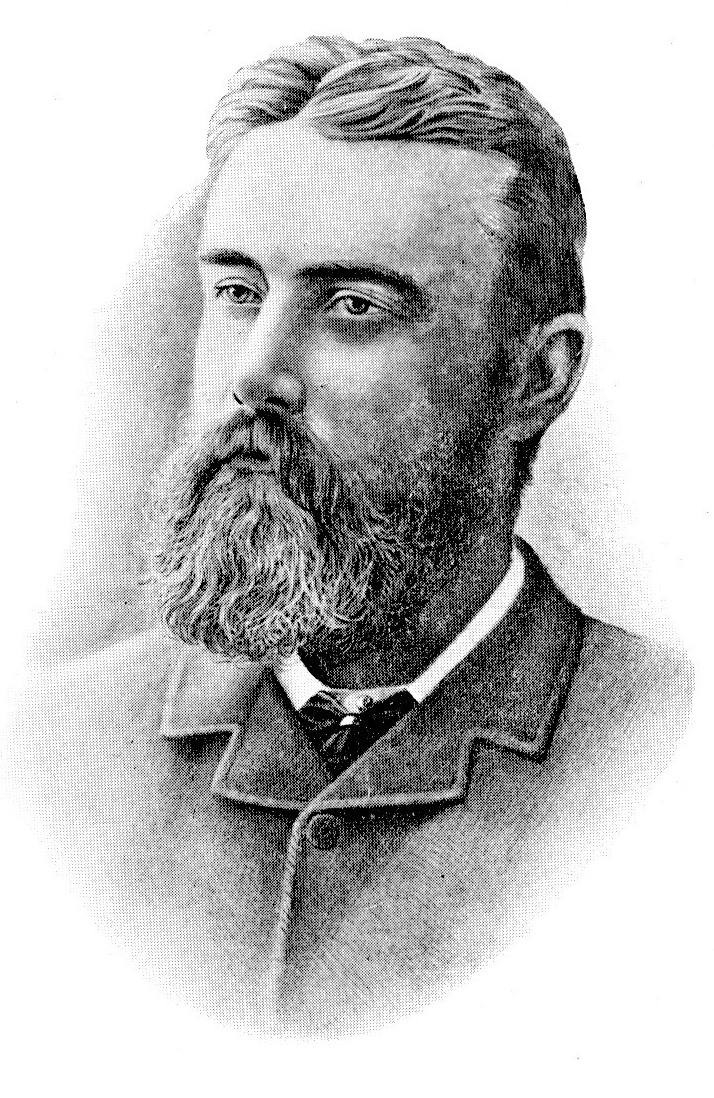
ERNEST FAVENC. The drawing appeared on page 223 of The Explorers of Australia and Their Life-Work, written by Ernest Favenc. The book was published in 1908 by Whitcombe and Tombs Ltd.

Ernest Favenc (21 October 1845 – 14 November 1908) was an explorer of Australia, a journalist, author of verse, novels and short stories, and an historian.

== Personal life ==
Favenc was born in Walworth, Surrey, England. Of Huguenot descent, he was the son of Abraham George Favenc, merchant, and his wife Emma, née Jones. He was educated at the Werdersches Gymnasium, Berlin and at Temple College, Cowley, Oxfordshire.

Favenc arrived in New South Wales in 1864, and, after being in the colony for about a year, in a commercial position, he afterwards worked in the pastoral industry in the frontier squatting districts of Queensland.

Favenc married Elizabeth Jones Matthews on 15 November 1880 in Sydney. Favenc died at his Darlinghurst home in Sydney on 14 November 1908, and was survived by Elizabeth Jane and their daughter.

== Exploration ==
In July 1878 the proprietor of The Queenslander newspaper employed him to explore the country along the western border of Queensland to Darwin to evaluate the possibility of connecting the Queensland Railways to Port Darwin. The journey took him six months, and he reported that such a line would be feasible. Unusually for the period, his wife Emma was also part of the expedition party.

In the early 1880s he also undertook expeditions in the country to the south of the Gulf of Carpentaria and to the headwaters of the Murchison, Gascoyne and Ashburton rivers of Western Australia.

In 1882 he and his wife were on Thursday Island when they were joined by Emily and Harry Alington Creaghe who had married the year before. They intended to explore and they travelled by sea to Normanton and landed on 17 January 1883.

== Writing ==
Favenc's first publication was The Great Austral Plain in 1887. The Last of Six: Tales of the Austral Tropics appeared in 1893, followed by The Secret of the Australian Desert (a short novel) in 1895, Marooned on Australia and The Moccasins of Silence, both in 1896.

Favenc also wrote under the pseudonym of "Dramingo", often for The Queenslander, and was an accomplished pencil sketcher. He also published romances, children's stories and verse as well as several books on exploration, the most extensive being The History of Australian Exploration from 1788 to 1888.

On the original launch of this book in 1888 the Sydney, Australia Daily Telegraph reported:

The History of Australian Exploration is an important one and however diverse may have been the aims, ideas and successes of those by whom the work was done,...Ernest Favenc's rather formidable volume...gathers together all those scattered memorials merging it into a unity of a great labour. Favenc was himself an explorer and treats his subject not in a perfunctory way, but as one who feels the wild charm and the magical attraction of the unknown...

== Affiliations ==
Favenc attended the inaugural meetings of the Johnsonian Club in Brisbane, Queensland in 1878 and the Savage Club in Adelaide, South Australia in 1883. From 1883 there are references to Favenc being known to his friends as "the pard".

== Works ==
- A Romance of Kangaroo Point (1876). (written as "Dramingo" and first published in The Queenslander)
- The Great Austral Plain (1887).
- The History of Australian Exploration from 1788 to 1888 (1888).
- The Last of Six: Tales of the Austral Tropics (1893).
- The Secret of the Australian Desert (1895).
- The Moccasins of Silence (1896).
- Marooned on Australia: Being the Narration by Diedrich Buys of his Discoveries and Exploits in Terra Australis Incognita (1896).
- The Explorers of Australia and their Life-work (1908).
