= Yurlayurlanya =

Indigenous Australian group

The Yurlayurlanya, formerly spelt Ulaolinya, were an Aboriginal Australian group living in the Glenormiston region of South West Queensland.

== Language ==
The Yurlayurlanya language is classified by Gavan Breen as one of the Palku subgroup of the Karnic languages. They also had a sign language.

== Country ==
They were indigenous to the Boulia area, but were eventually pushed out as white pastoral settlements expanded in their territory.

== Pituri ==
The Yurlayurlanya seemed to have played an important role in trading the aboriginal narcotic pituri in Queensland. That form of the word is conserved in their language, while all the surrounding tribes in the Boulia area used a different term Thus for the Ayerrereng (Yaroinga) tribe round Lake Nash Station and Urandangi it was neempa; for the Antekerrepenh (Undekerebina), just southwards, between the Georgina and the Northern Territory, it was undakora, for the Kalkatungu, to their west it was moda; while the contiguous Pitta Pitta and Karanya of the Boulia district called it tarembola and tirumbola respectively.

== History ==
By the 1890s, Walter Roth stated that the displaced Yurlayurlanya had congregated around Carlo Springs (Mungeribar) and the upper Mulligan River.

== Reports of sexual abuse in traditional culture ==
Louis Nowra writing of violence in Aboriginal communities cited a report that the Yurlayurlanya, like other tribes in the Glenormiston area, would ambush girls to deflower them. Four would pin one down, and, while her eyes were covered, one, presumed to be elderly, would emerge from a nearby hide-out, slit her perineum with a stone knife, and penetrate her with 3 fingers. This was a prelude to gang rape, the original four copulating with her three times, the last occasion being the following morning.

The original source, the ethnographical report by Walter Roth, discussed the Yurlayurlanya case in the context of tribes practising both sub-incision on males and, in this case, introcision on females. It is a ceremonial rite, following a corroboree. A girl who is recognized as having achieved full puberty is enticed out of the camp by an aged woman, the pretext being to harvest papa-seed. The introcision transforms her from a wapiri to a kanari. The first copulation is followed by her being adorned with red and white bands of charcoal and feather-down, fixed by the blood from her wound. After successive copulations, the semen is scooped into a coolamon and, mixed with water, used as a curative for the sick and elderly males. On completion of the rite, the initiated young woman may then wear a variety of ornaments, such as kangaroo teeth on her forehead, and a grass necklace.

Reviewing the book, together with Sven Lindqvist's Exterminate All the Brutes, Robert Manne argued that Nowra tried to anchor the sociopathic elements of contemporary broken Aboriginal societies back in time to the traditional cultures prevailing in their pre-white nomadic world. Manne notes a number of key distortions of sources, and while allowing that violence was not alien to the older Aboriginal world, it was acknowledged almost universally that children were exempt from it, and indeed it was thought they were overindulgent.

== Sources ==
- Breen, Gavan (2016). "W E Roth and the Study of Aboriginal Languages in Queensland". In McDougall, Russell; Davidson, Iain (eds.). The Roth Family, Anthropology, and Colonial Administration. Routledge. pp. 133–156. ISBN 978-1-315-41728-8.
- Gray, Louis H. (1910). "Circumcision". In Hastings, James (ed.). Encyclopædia of Religion and Ethics. Vol. 3. T&T Clark. pp. 659–670.
- Johnston, T. Harvey; Cleland, J. Burton (1933). "The History of the Aboriginal Narcotic, Pituri". Oceania. 4 (2): 201–223. doi:10.1002/j.1834-4461.1933.tb00101.x. JSTOR 40327460.
- Kendon, Adam (1988). Sign Languages of Aboriginal Australia: Cultural, Semiotic and Communicative Perspectives. Cambridge University Press. ISBN 978-0-521-36008-1.
- Koch, Harold James (2004). "A methodological history of Australian linguisticd classification". In Koch l, Harold; Bowern, Claire (eds.). Australian Languages: Classification and the Comparative Method. John Benjamins Publishing. pp. 17–59. ISBN 978-9-027-24761-2.
- Manne, Robert (June 2007). "The lost enchanted world". The Monthly.
- Nowra, Louis (2007). Bad Dreaming: Aboriginal Men's Violence Against Women & Children. Pluto Press. ISBN 978-0-980-29240-4.
- Pearson, Christopher (4 August 2007). A long tradition of abuse. Archived from the original on 30 January 2017.
- Roth, W. E. (1897). Ethnological Studies among the North-West-Central Queensland Aborigines. Brisbane: Edmund Gregory, Government Printer.
