= Yalarnnga =

Indigenous Australian people of Queensland

The Yalarnnga, also known as the Jalanga, are an Indigenous Australian people of the state of Queensland.

== Language ==
Yalarnnga is an extinct Australian Aboriginal language, hypothesized to be one of the two Galgadungic languages of the Pama–Nyungan language family. The last native speaker died in 1980.

== Country ==
Norman Tindale estimated their territorial range at 11,000 square kilometres (4,200 sq mi), in the area of Wills Creek, going south of Duchess to Fort William. They lived along the Burke and Mort Rivers and to the north of Chatsworth, and in the localities around Noranside and Buckingham Downs.

== History of contact ==
The lands of the Yalarnnga were first occupied by white settlers in 1877, at which time their numbers were estimated to be around 200 people.

== Alternative names ==
- Yellunga
- Yelina
- Wonganja (putatively an extinct Yalarnnga horde)

== Vocabulary ==
Some words from the Yalarnnga language, as spelt and written by Yalarnnga authors include:

- Kuyungu mungatha: good day
- Karlu / karlo: father
- Mernoo: mother
- Woothane: white man
- Kathirr: grass
- Karni: shoulder
- Katyimpa: two
- Kunyu: water
- Karrkuru: yellowbelly (fish)
- Monero: tame dog

== Sources ==
- Breen, Gavan; Blake, Barry J. (2007). The grammar of Yalarnnga: a language of western Queensland. Pacific Linguistics. ISBN 978-0-858-83567-2.
- Eglinton, E. (1886). "The Burke River" (PDF). In Curr, Edward Micklethwaite (ed.). The Australian race: its origin, languages, customs, place of landing in Australia and the routes by which it spread itself over the continent. Vol. 2. Melbourne: J. Ferres. pp. 346–349.
- Roth, W. E. (1897). Ethnological Studies among the North-West-Central Queensland Aborigines (PDF). Brisbane: Edmund Gregory, Government Printer.
- Tindale, Norman Barnett (1974). "Jalanga (QLD)". Aboriginal Tribes of Australia: Their Terrain, Environmental Controls, Distribution, Limits, and Proper Names. Australian National University Press. Archived from the original on 9 February 2018.
- "G8 Yalarnnga". Australian Institute of Aboriginal and Torres Strait Islander Studies. 26 July 2019.
- This Wikipedia article incorporates text from Yalarnnga by State Library of Queensland published by the State Library of Queensland under CC BY licence, accessed on 17 May 2022.
