= Wongkadjera =

Indigenous people of Australia

The Wongkadjera were an Indigenous people of the state of Queensland.

== Country ==
Norman Tindale calculated that the Wongkadjera's tribal territory covered about 2,300 square miles (6,000 km^{2}) in the area of Glenormiston and Herbert Downs. Their northern limits were close to Roxborough.

== Social organization ==
The Wongkadjera were divided into hordes, the name of one of which probably survives.

- ? Nambila-nambila

== Economy ==
The Glenormiston area around the Mulligan River was a key producer of the narcotic pituri, and archaeological evidence has emerged suggesting that the Furthermore, it is postulated that the Wongkadjera, together with other local tribes, such as the Rungarungawa and Julaolinja, used it and stone axes from the Kalkatungu mines in the Mt. Isa district as trade goods, exchanging them in order to secure access to the Channel Country along the Georgina and Diamantina Rivers.

== Alternative names ==
- Wonkajara
- Wonkatyeri
- Wonkoyara

Source: Tindale 1974, p. 190

== Sources ==
- "AIATSIS map of Indigenous Australia". AIATSIS. 28 July 2023.
- Coghlan, J. (1898). "Foods of north west aboriginals (Glenormiston, Queensland)". Science of Man (2). Sydney: 48.
- Roth, W. E. (1897). Ethnological Studies among the North-West-Central Queensland Aborigines (PDF). Brisbane: Edmund Gregory, Government Printer.
- Tibbett, Kevin (2002). "Archaeological analysis of stone axe exchange networks in the Lake Eyre Basin during the mid- to late Holocene". Australian Archaeology (55): 22–29.
- Tindale, Norman Barnett (1974). "Wongkadjera (QLD)". Aboriginal Tribes of Australia: Their Terrain, Environmental Controls, Distribution, Limits, and Proper Names. Australian National University Press. ISBN 978-0-708-10741-6.
