= Kalkatungu =

Aboriginal peoples of Queensland, Australia

Kalkadoon
Total population
- several hundred (less than 1% of the Australian population, about 1% of the Aboriginal population)

Regions with significant populations
- Australia (Queensland)

Languages
- Australian English, formerly Kalkatungu language

Religion
- Aboriginal mythology

The Kalkadoon (properly Kalkatungu) are descendants of an Indigenous Australian tribe living in the Mount Isa region of Queensland. Their ancestral tribe has been called "the elite of the Aboriginal warriors of Queensland". In 1884 they were massacred at "Battle Mountain" by settlers and police.

== Language ==
Kalkatung belonged to the Kalkatungic branch of the Pama-Nyungan language family, the other being Yalarnnga which was spoken to its south in the area of Djarra, in Queensland. Kalkatungu was spoken around Mount Isa, Queensland. Nothing is known of a third language Wakabunga sometimes thought to have had a genetic relation to the other two.

Remnants of the language collected from the last native speakers by Barry Blake allowed the rudiments of the grammar and the language to be reconstructed. According to Robert M. W. Dixon there is a 43% overlap in vocabulary existed with Yalarnnga but with a different grammar and only 10% percent of verbs cognate. Both have bounded pronouns or traces of them unlike all other languages in the surrounding areas suggesting they represented, until their extinction, a larger block of distinctive languages.

Like many other Aboriginal societies, the Kalkatungu had a sign language. The idea of a large kangaroo, for example, was indicated by joining the tip of the forefinger to the thumb, with all other fingers remaining extended, while flicking the wrist forward (suggestive of the hopping motion). A land snake was indicated by pointing the forefinger, while rotating the wrist and extending one's arm outwards.

== Ecology and material/artistic culture ==
The Kalkatungu's traditional lands began at the heads of the Cloncurry river across the heads of the Leichhardt and Gregory Rivers, including the Barkly Tableland, the Selwyn ranges and extending south to around Chatsworth, Mount Merlin and Buckingham Downs. To their east and north, were the Mayi-Thakurti (Mitakoodi) of the Cloncurry district, and next to the Maigudung tribe, according to Palmer.

Walter Roth documented in some detail the intensity of indigenous trading passing through the Selwyn Range and Kalkatungu lands from Boulia to Cloncurry, which formed a transit point for exchanges of everything from the native medical anaesthetic and narcotic stimulant, pituri, and ochre to stone knives and axes. Over 800,000 stone axe blanks remain strewn over the 2.4 sq.km metabasalt quarry at Lake Moondarra near Mt Isa, attesting to the intensity of Aboriginal manufacturing of trade goods in this Kalkatungu area, with some axes being traded as far distant as 1,000 kilometres.

The Kalkatungu were an early transmission group for the diffusion of the Mudlunga (Molonga) ritual dance from the Georgina River. A photo exists of their men in full ceremonial raiment, dated 1895, prepared to perform their version of the dance that, within a few decades, would reach across Australia.

Extensive rock art, with examples of anthropomorphic paintings, has been recorded in the Kalkatungu's Selwyn Range homeland.

== Social structure ==
The nearby Mayi-Thakurti tribe occasionally reported that the Kalkatungu were split into two major divisions, the Muntaba (southern) and the Roongkari (western) peoples.

== Mythology ==
Frederic Urquart, who as a trooper took part in a massacre of Kalkadoon warriors, recounted their myth regarding the origins of fire. It started with a thunderbolt that set the plains on fire, as the tribe were preparing to eat raw meat. The flames swept over the camp site, and the charred meat was found to be tastier. An old woman was sent to track the fire and fetch it back, and brought back a blazing stick. Charged with being the fire-keeper, she loyally watched over it for years, until a flood washed out the camp-fire. She was exiled until she could retrieve the secret of fire and, failing to do so, in rage rubbed two sticks together, a flame kindled, and she won back entry to the tribe.

== History ==
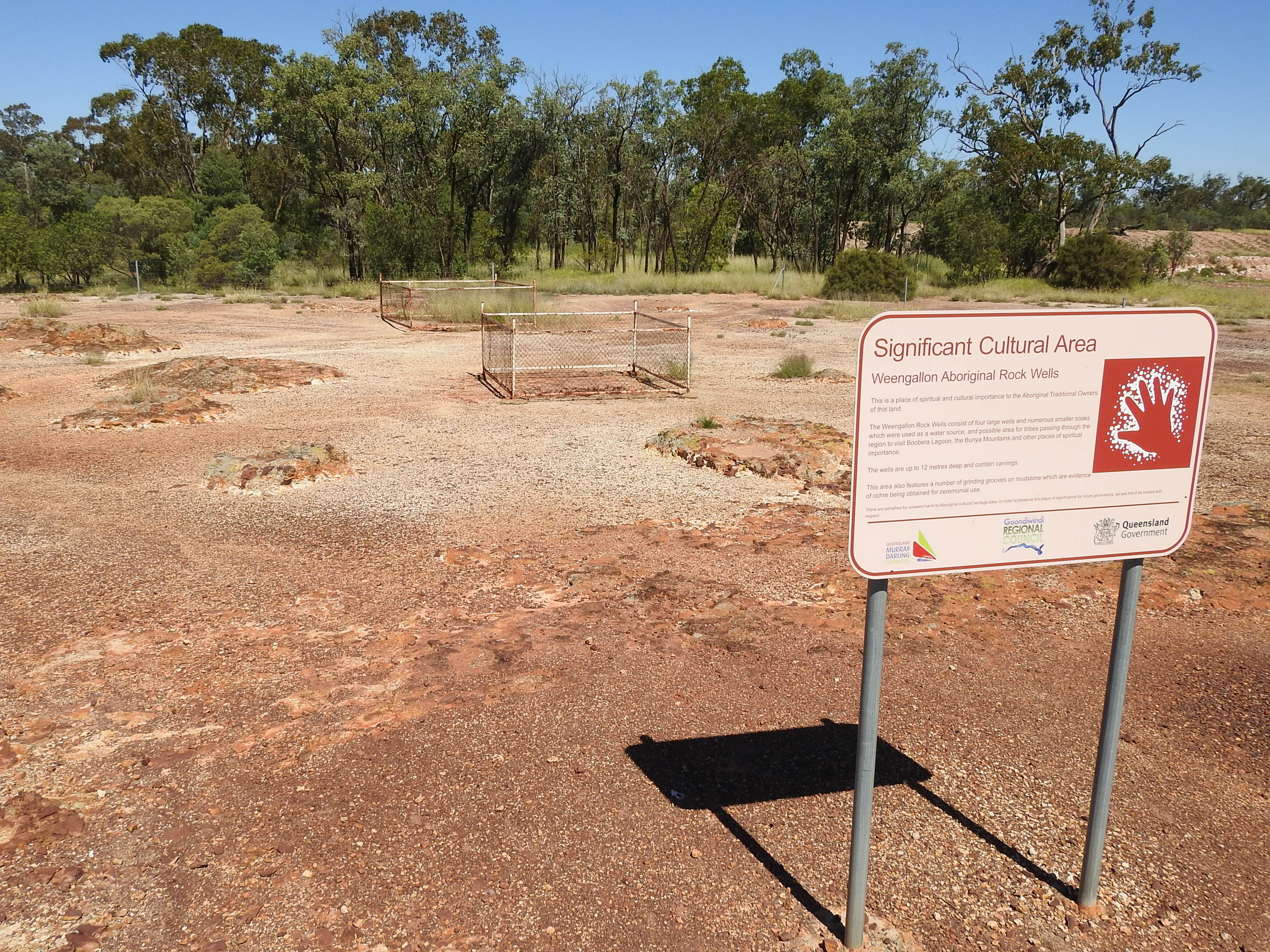
Rock wells at Weengallon, considered a significant Kalkatungu cultural site

The first Europeans to visit the area were explorers Burke and Wills, who crossed the Cloncurry River in 1861. Though their journals make no mention of the tribe, their passing through is said to have been recorded in Kalkatungu oral history, and in their language they coined the term walpala (from "white feller") to denote Europeans. (Note: Henry Reynolds p.43, adduces such coinages in native language as evidence that, contrary to many reports regarding coastal peoples, for the aboridgines of the hinterland, such a domesticated foreign terminology suggests the presence of whites there was not considered as representing ancestors, ghosts or spirits) Three parties sent out to search for Burke and Wills, led respectively by John McKinlay, William Landsborough, and Frederick Walker, passed through the general area, and Walker, former commander of the Dawson native police, shot 12 natives dead, while wounding several more, just to the north east of Kalkatungu territory.

Edward Palmer, described by George Phillips as "one of that brave band of pioneer squatters who in the early sixties swept across North Queensland with their flocks and herds, settling, as if by magic, great tracts of hitherto unoccupied country", settled on the edge of Kalkatungu country in 1864, at Conobie, on the western bank of the Cloncurry River. Decades later, he described them as a peculiar people of whom little was known. Palmer was critical of the use of native police, and interested in indigenous tribes. His station lands did not cover any Kalkatungu sacred sites, he did not object to their presence in the vicinity, and found no problem in his relations with the Kalkatungu. He tried to learn their language. Ernest Henry arrived in 1866, discovering, with the assistance of Kalkatungu guides, copper deposits the following year, and founded the Great Australia Mine. He successfully enlisted some Kalkatungu people to work one of these mines. A short attempt at settlement by W. and T. Brown at Bridgewater in 1874 experienced, like Palmer, no difficulties with the indigenous owners of the land.

The Scottish settler Alexander Kennedy then took up land in the area in 1877. He had managed, since his arrival in 1861, to accumulate land holdings of some 4,800 square miles (12,000 km^{2}), holding 60,000 cattle, and established himself in a residence he built, called Buckingham Downs. Kennedy is thought to have begun the troubles with the native peoples of the area by instigating murderous assaults on the Kalkatung. Iain Davidson describes him as "the man who led the destruction of the tribes of North West Central Queensland".

The traditional white heroic narrative version of what then occurred drew on the account provided by Wilmot Hudson Fysh in 1933. According to this version, the Kalkatungu were by nature a hostile and bellicose tribe, exceptionally brave with "primitive" military cunning and guerilla-like tactics of strategic withdrawals to the mountains to evade reprisals for their savagery, who were vanquished and broken after a last stand against men like Kennedy who triumphed heroically in pursuing the moral and economic progress of Queensland.

== Massacre at Battle Hill ==
In December 1878, a settler called Molvo and three of his men were killed near Cloncurry, at the important Wonomo watering hole on Suleiman Creek near Cloncurry, as they camped with their herd. This was the starting point, in indigenous history, for Kennedy and other settlers in the district joining forces with native troops under Inspector Eglinton stationed at Boulia to war down the native tribes of the region. Subsequent to this incident, scores of Kalkatungu in the surrounding hills were shot down.

Over the following years, the Kalkatungu gained a reputation among graziers for tactical wiliness both in resisting police and settler forays against them, and in harvesting cattle found on their lands. Kennedy pulled strings in Brisbane to get reinforcements that might guarantee greater immunity for people and property in the area, and the first Queensland Commissioner of Police D. T. Seymour is said to have given Kennedy a blank cheque to war down the tribe and to have dispatched the aristocratic Marcus de la Poer Beresford, a nephew of the Marquess of Waterford, as new head of the Cloncurry native police unit to that end.

On 24 January 1883, Beresford camped with four of his troopers at Fullarton River in the McKinlay Range. After skirmishing with a group of Kalkatungu, they managed to corral a number, who appeared to give no resistance, into a gully nearby and post a guard over them for the night. Queensland historian Arthur Laurie suggests Beresford's error lay in "stupidly treat(ing) them like cattle". It is presumed that they had a stash of arms prepared for the occasion, and rose up, and killed Beresford and three of his men. One, though speared in his side, managed to escape and cover the distance, some 20 miles, to Farleigh station the following day. For a year, the Kalkatungu managed to hold sway over their tribal lands, as both settlers and the police felt intimidated by their unbeaten territorial ascendancy. According to an anonymous person writing for the Queensland Figaro, nonetheless, sometime towards the end of 1883, the native police "wilfully murdered eight blackfellows and several gins" in the area.

In March 1884, Sir Thomas McIlwraith sent Frederic Urquhart, a Sussex immigrant, employed in the Queensland Native Mounted Police Force to handle the crisis. The Kalkatungu are said to have directly challenged him to fight, via a messenger called Mahoni. Urquhart, though based in Cloncurry, set up a forward camp 25 miles outside of the town, on the Corella River.

Urquhart was galvanized into action in August on hearing from a native boy, Jackie, who came in and reported that his employer James White Powell of Calton Hills, some 60 miles west of Cloncurry, at Mistake Creek, had been speared to death. Powell was a partner of Kennedy's, and the latter, together with Urquhart and A.F. Mossman from White Hills station buried Powell, with Urquhart composing a poem vowing vengeance:

Grimly the troopers stood around
that newly made forest grave
and to their eyes that fresh heap mound
for vengeance seemed to crave.

And one spoke out in deep stern tones
and raised his hand on high
For every one of these poor bones
a Kalkadoon shall die. (Note: The article, "Native Police", citing this poem "Powell's Revenge", appeared in the Queensland Figaro 15 November 1884 and continued: "it is bad enough to know that such a cursed stain on the country exists as a Native Police force; but it is diabolical to have its unhallowed work chronicled in idiotic rhyme" that "clothe brutality and cowardice with a mantle of glory and heroism".)

The group responsible was tracked down to a gorge, where they were feasting on the cattle, and most were mowed down. Over the next nine weeks, settlers and Urquhart's police tracked the Kalkadoons relentlessly in a war of retaliation, killing many. In September, a Chinese shepherd from H.Hopkins's Granada Station on the Dugald River was speared to death in the foothills of the Argylla Ranges, and it was rumoured he had been eaten by "cannibals". Soon afterwards, an estimated 600 Kalkatungu warriors gathered on a rocky outlook to fend off the parties of well-armed settlers, the local constabulary and native troopers. At one point the attackers under Urquhart tried a flanking movement, which caused the assembled Aborigines to charge straight down on them, only to fall in waves under the withering fire of the muskets, called makini by the Kalkatungu. 200 are said to have died in this battle. Urquhart himself was knocked out, and this broke the back of organised resistance at a tribal level, and it was often touted that the Kalkatungu had been wiped out. The estimated numbers they lost over six years, from 1878 to 1884, in counter-attacking incursions and the exercise of expropriation over their lands, runs to 900.

== Memorial ==
In 1984 on the centenary of the massacre a plaque commemorating the Kalkatungu was unveiled by Charles Perkins and George Thorpe a Kalkatung elder, at the Kajabbi bush pub north of Cloncurry. It reads in part:

This obelisk is in memorial to the Kalkatungu tribes, who during September 1884 fought one of Australia's historic battles of resistance against a para-military force of European settlers and the Queensland native Mounted Police at a place known today as Battle Mountain - 20klms [sic] south west of Kajabbi.

The Kalkadoon have been commemorated in the name of the Kalkadoon grasswren, a bird with a small territorial range confined to the slopes of the Mt Isa region.

== See also ==
- List of massacres of Indigenous Australians

== Sources ==
- "AIATSIS map of Indigenous Australia". AIATSIS. 24 June 2022.
- Armstrong, Robert E. M. (1980). The Kalkadoons: A Study of an Aboriginal Tribe on the Queensland Frontier. William Brooks & Company. ISBN 978-0-855-68483-9.
- Blake, Barry (1979). A Kalkatungu grammar. Research School of Pacific Studies. ISBN 978-0-858-83197-1.
- Campbell, Iain; Woods, Sam; Leseberg, Nick (2014). Birds of Australia: A Photographic Guide. Princeton University Press. ISBN 978-1-400-86510-9.
- Davidson, Iain (2016). "Ethnological Studies and Archaeology of North West Central Queensland". In McDougall, Russell; Davidson, Iain (eds.). The Roth Family, Anthropology, and Colonial Administration. Routledge. pp. 121–132. ISBN 978-1-315-41728-8.
- Dixon, Robert M. W. (2004) [First published 2002]. Australian Languages: Their Nature and Development. Vol. 1. Cambridge University Press. ISBN 978-0-521-47378-1.
- Drake, Jack (2012). The Wild West in Australia and America. Vol. 1. Boolarong Press. ISBN 978-1-921-92047-9.
- Furniss, Elizabeth (2006). "Challenging the myth of indigenous peoples' 'last stand' in Canada and Australia: public discourse and the conditions of silence". In Coombes, Annie E. (ed.). Rethinking Settler Colonialism: History and Memory in Australia, Canada, New Zealand and South Africa. Manchester University Press. pp. 172–192. ISBN 978-0-719-07168-3.
- Fysh, Wilmot Hudson (1933). Taming the North: The Story of Alexander Kennedy and Other Queensland Pathfinders. Angus & Robertson.
- Gibson, Lisanne; Besley, Joanne (2004). Monumental Queensland: Signposts on a Cultural Landscape. University of Queensland. ISBN 978-0-702-23465-1.
- Johnston, T. Harvey; Cleland, J. Burton (1933). "The History of the Aboriginal Narcotic, Pituri". Oceania. 4 (2): 201–223. doi:10.1002/j.1834-4461.1933.tb00101.x. JSTOR 40327460.
- Kendon, Adam (1988). Sign Languages of Aboriginal Australia: Cultural, Semiotic and Communicative Perspectives. Cambridge University Press. ISBN 978-0-521-36008-1.
- Lack, Clem (1959). Lack, Clem; Cilento, Raphael West (eds.). Triumph in the tropics: an historical sketch of Queensland. Smith & Paterson.
- Laurie, Arthur (23 October 1958). The Black War in Queensland (PDF). Royal Historical Society of Queensland.
- McNiven, Ian J. (2015). "Australasia and the Pacific". In Benjamin, Craig (ed.). The Cambridge World History: Volume 4, A World with States, Empires and Networks 1200 BCE–900 CE. Cambridge University Press. pp. 603–630. ISBN 978-1-316-29830-5.
- Mulvaney, John D. (1976). "The chain of connection". In Peterson, Nicolas (ed.). Tribes and boundaries. Australian Institute of Aboriginal Studies. pp. 72–94. ISBN 978-0-855-75048-0.
- Palmer, Edward (1884). Notes on some Australian tribes. London: Harrison and Sons.
- Palmer, Edward (1903). Early Days in North Queensland. Angus & Robertson.
- Reynolds, Henry (2006). The Other Side of the Frontier: Aboriginal Resistance to the European Invasion of Australia. University of New South Wales Press. ISBN 978-1-742-24049-7.
- Richards, Jonathan (2008). The Secret War: A True History of Queensland's Native Police. University of Queensland Press. ISBN 978-0-702-23639-6.
- Roth, W. E. (1897). Ethnological Studies among the North-West-Central Queensland Aborigines (PDF). Brisbane: Edmund Gregory, Government Printer.
- Towner, A. C. (1962). "An outline of the history of Western Queensland" (PDF). Journal of the Royal Historical Society of Queensland. 6 (4): 779–816.
- Urquhart, Frederic Charles (1885). "Legends of the Australian Aborigines". The Journal of the Anthropological Institute of Great Britain and Ireland. 14: 87–88. doi:10.2307/2841487. JSTOR 2841487.
