= Lanima =

Lanima may refer to:

- Lanima people, a former ethnic group of Australia
- Lanima language, an extinct Australian language

== See also ==
- Lamina (disambiguation)
