= Pitta Pitta language =

Extinct Australian Aboriginal language

Pitta Pitta
- Region: Queensland
- Ethnicity: Pitapita, Ringaringa, Rakkaia, Karanya, Kungkalenja, Maiawali
- Native speakers: (3 cited 1979) likely extinct
- Language family: Pama–Nyungan: Karnic; Palku; Pitta Pitta
- Dialects: Pitta-Pitta; Ringu-Ringu; Rakaya; Ngulupulu/Karanja; Kunkalanja; Mayawarli (Maiawali)
- Signed forms: Pitha Pitha Sign Language

Language codes
- ISO 639-3: pit – inclusive code Individual code: yxa – Mayawali (Maiawali)
- Glottolog: pitt1247 Pitta Pitta
- AIATSIS: G6 Pitta Pitta (other dialects listed from here)
- ELP: Pitta-Pitta

Pitta Pitta (also known by several other names and spellings) is an extinct Australian Aboriginal language. It was spoken around Boulia, Queensland.

== Status ==
In 1979, Barry J. Blake reported that Pitta Pitta was "virtually extinct", with only three speakers remaining – Ivy Nardoo of Boulia, and Ted Marshall and Linda Craigie of Mount Isa. It is now considered unlikely that any speakers remain.

== Phonology ==
=== Vowels ===
	Front	Central	Back
High	i iː		u uː
Low		a aː	

=== Consonants ===
	Peripheral		Laminal		Apical		
	Labial	Velar	Dental	Palatal	Alveolar		Retroflex
Plosive	p	k	t̪	c	t		ʈ
Nasal	m	ŋ	n̪	ɲ	n		ɳ
Lateral			l̪	ʎ	l		ɭ
Tap/Trill					ɾ	r	
Approximant	w			j			ɻ

== Vocabulary ==
Below is a basic vocabulary list from Blake (1981).

English	Pitta-Pitta
man	karna
woman	parratya
mother	ngamari
father	yapiri
head	karti
eye	miyi
nose	milya
ear	ngarra
mouth	parla
tongue	ṯarli
tooth	mirlka
hand	mara
breast	kaputyu
stomach	ngampa
urine	purra
faeces	kuna
thigh	marla
foot	ṯina
bone	pirna
blood	kimpa
dog	piyawarli
snake	kaṯi
kangaroo	kulipila
possum	ṯinapali
fish	kupi
spider	kupu
mosquito	kuṉṯi
emu	warrukatyi
eaglehawk	kurriṯala
crow	wakiri
sun	warlka
moon	tyangi
star	tyinpi
stone	tipu
water	ngapu
camp	ngurra
fire	maka
smoke	kuṯu
food	yaṉṯurru
meat	kaṯi
stand	ṯarrka
sit	ṉangka
see	ṉatyi
go	karnta
get	marri
hit	piṯi
I	ngantya
you	inpa
one	ngururu
two	parrkula

=== Pituri ===
The name pituri for the leaves chewed as a stimulant by traditional Aboriginal people has been claimed to be derived from the Pitta Pitta word pijiri. though Walter Roth pointed out in 1897 that the word 'pituri', thus pronounced, was the term used by the neighbouring Yurlayurlanya people, and added that the Pitta Pitta people called it "tarembola".

== Sign language ==
The Pitta Pitta had a well-developed signed form of their language.
