= Wakabunga =

Aboriginal Australian people

The Wakabunga are an indigenous Australian people of the state of Queensland.

== Language ==
Norman Tindale referred to material by two early correspondents, Urquhart and O'Reilley, in a publication by E. M. Curr for details about the Wakabunga and their language, but the word-list is not considered to contain elements of this tongue, about which the general belief is that no information survives. It has been suggested by Barry Blake however, that a word-list compiled in the Wakabunga domain by Curr's brother Montagu Curr, belong to a Mayi dialect. From this it has been inferred that Wakabunga may have belonged to the Mayi language family.

== Country ==
The Wakabunga traditional lands covered an estimated 4,900 square miles (13,000 km^{2}) in the area of the Upper Leichhardt River and Gunpowder Creek.

== People ==
According to Norman Tindale they were related to the Kalkatungu. They were crocodile hunters, stalking freshwater crocodiles with spears on the upper Leichhardt.

== Alternative names ==
- Workabunga
- Workoboongo
- Wakobungo, Waukaboonia
- Waggabundi
- Waggaboonyah
- Kabikabi

== Sources ==
- Blake, Barry (1990). "Languages of the Queensland/Northern Territory Border: Updating the classification". In Austin, Peter (ed.). Language and History: Essays in Honour of Luise A. Hercus. Research School of Pacific Studies. pp. 49–65. ISBN 978-0-858-83398-2.
- Curr, Montagu (1886). "Kamilaroi station, Leichardt River" (PDF). In Curr, Edward Micklethwaite (ed.). The Australian race: its origin, languages, customs, place of landing in Australia and the routes by which it spread itself over the continent. Vol. 2. Melbourne: J. Ferres. pp. 318–320.
- Roth, W. E. (1897). Ethnological Studies among the North-West-Central Queensland Aborigines (PDF). Brisbane: Edmund Gregory, Government Printer.
- Tindale, Norman Barnett (1974). "Wakabunga (QLD)". Aboriginal Tribes of Australia: Their Terrain, Environmental Controls, Distribution, Limits, and Proper Names. Australian National University Press. Archived from the original on 27 February 2020.
- Urquhart, F.; Joseph, O'Reilley (1886). "Seymour, Templeton and Cloncurry Rivers" (PDF). In Curr, Edward Micklethwaite (ed.). The Australian race: its origin, languages, customs, place of landing in Australia and the routes by which it spread itself over the continent. Vol. 2. Melbourne: J. Ferres. pp. 326–329.
