= Julaolinja =

Indigenous Australian people

The Julaolinja (Ulaolinya, Yurlayurlanya) were an indigenous Australian people of the state of Queensland.

== Country ==
The Julaolinja were a people of the Channel Country, with an estimated (according to Norman Tindale) territorial range of some 2,400 square miles (6,200 km^{2}), centered on the upper Mulligan River around Carlo Springs

== History ==
The Julaolinja, according to Kevin Tibbett, were one of three tribes, the other two being the Wongkadjera and the Rungarungawa, whose position around the pituri growing area of the Mulligan River enabled them to control the trade routes from the northeast through to the southwest, by using the native narcotic and stone axes from the north as trading goods.

With the onset of colonial settlement of their lands, they eventually shifted east to the area around Marion Downs.

== Alternative names ==
- Judanja
- Judanji
- Jura
- U-la-linya, U-la-linye, U-lay-linye
- Ulaolinja
- Ulaolinya
- Uluonga
- Yoolanlanya

Source: Tindale 1974, p. 172

== Some words ==
- kurna (man)
- woilla (woman)

== Sources ==
- "AIATSIS map of Indigenous Australia". AIATSIS. 10 January 2021.
- Field, W. G. (1898). "U-la-linya tribe, Sandringham Station, West Queensland". Science of Man. 1 (3). Sydney: 61.
- Fraser, A. (1897). "Mulligan River dialect". Australian Anthropological Journal. 1 (6). Sydney: 123.
- Mathews, R.H. (1899). "Division of tribes in the northern territory". Journal and Proceedings of the Royal Society of New South Wales. 33. Sydney: 111–114.
- Mathews, R. H. (1901). "Ethnological notes on the aboriginal tribes of the Northern Territory". Queensland Geographical Journal. 16: 69–90.
- Roth, W. E. (1897). Ethnological Studies among the North-West-Central Queensland Aborigines (PDF). Brisbane: Edmund Gregory, Government Printer.
- Tibbett, Kevin (2002). "Archaeological analysis of stone axe exchange networks in the Lake Eyre Basin during the mid- to late Holocene". Australian Archaeology (55): 22–29.
- Tindale, Norman Barnett (1974). "Julaolinja (QLD)". Aboriginal Tribes of Australia: Their Terrain, Environmental Controls, Distribution, Limits, and Proper Names. Australian National University Press. ISBN 978-0-708-10741-6.
