= YLR =

YLR may refer to:

- Yale Law Journal, legal journal sometimes called the Yale Law Review
- Leaf Rapids Airport
- Yaxham Light Railway
- the ISO 639 code for the Yalarnnga language
