= Kunkalanya =

Aboriginal Australian people

The Kungkalenja (Kunkalanya) were an indigenous Australian people of the Channel Country in the state of Queensland.

== Language ==
A short list of Kungkalenja words was compiled by W. G. Field and published in 1898.

== Country ==
Little has been conserved of the Kungkalenja people. They inhabited the area north of the Karanja and Bedourie. Norman Tindale assigns them his estimate of some 2,700 square miles (7,000 km^{2}) of territory on the Georgina River, running west from Moorabulla to the vicinity of the Mulligan River, and also on Sylvester Creek to an otherwise unidentified place known as Talaera Springs.

== Alternative names ==
- Kunkulenje
- Koonkoolenya
- Koomkoolenya
- Koonkalinga
- Koonkalinye

== Some words ==
- wolka (sun)

== Sources ==
- "AIATSIS map of Indigenous Australia". AIATSIS. 14 May 2024.
- Field, W. G. (21 March 1898). Koon-kalinga tribe, West Queensland. Vol. 1. Sydney: Science of Man. p. 42.
- Machattie, J. O. (1886). "Junction of King's River and the Georgina River" (PDF). In Curr, Edward Micklethwaite (ed.). The Australian race: its origin, languages, customs, place of landing in Australia and the routes by which it spread itself over the continent. Vol. 2. Melbourne: J. Ferres. pp. 366–369.
- Roth, W. E. (1897). Ethnological Studies among the North-West-Central Queensland Aborigines (PDF). Brisbane: Edmund Gregory, Government Printer.
- Tindale, Norman Barnett (1974). "Kungkalenja (QLD)". Aboriginal Tribes of Australia: Their Terrain, Environmental Controls, Distribution, Limits, and Proper Names. Australian National University. ISBN 978-0-708-10741-6.
