= Malintji =

Aboriginal Australian people

The Malintji were an indigenous Australian people of the state of Queensland.

== Country ==
In Norman Tindale's estimation the Malintji are considered as having held a tribal territory of approximately 5,000 square miles (13,000 km^{2}). They were the eastern neighbours of the Maiawali, living along Vergemont Creek, as far south as the vicinity of Jundah.

== Social customs ==
The Malintji did not accept circumcision as part of their initiatory rites.

== Alternative names ==
- Mullinchi, Mullinchie

== Sources ==
- "AIATSIS map of Indigenous Australia". AIATSIS. 14 May 2024.
- Mathews, R. H. (January 1900). "Divisions of the South Australian Aborigines". Proceedings of the American Philosophical Society. 29 (161): 78–91+93. JSTOR 983545.
- Mathews, R. H. (1905). Ethnological notes on the aboriginal tribes of Queensland (PDF). Vol. 20. Queensland Geographical Society. pp. 49–75.
- Tindale, Norman Barnett (1974). "Malintji (QLD)". Aboriginal Tribes of Australia: Their Terrain, Environmental Controls, Distribution, Limits, and Proper Names. Australian National University. ISBN 978-0-708-10741-6.
