= Ida Toby =

Australian linguist

Ida Toby (1899–1976), also known as "Queen", was an Australian linguist who collaborated on the documentation of the Warluwarra and Wangka-Yutjurru languages.

== Biography ==
Toby was born in 1899 at either Walgra or Carandotta station in Queensland. She was of Warluwarra and Wangka-Yutjurru (of Wangkamana group) descent.

Between 1967 and 1975 she worked extensively with Gavan Breen to help document the Warluwarra and Wangka-Yutjurru languages. She is said to have had an acting ability which allowed her to make up and act out imaginary conversations in those languages. In honour of this work, she is listed in the Australian Women's Register.

In 2013 a pictorial dictionary based on her work with Breen on Warluwarra was published by Desert Channels Queensland in partnership with The Georgina Diamantina & Cooper Aboriginal Group.
