= Coorabulka =

Rural Australian cattle station

Coordinates: 23.73106°S 140.30584°E

Location in Queensland

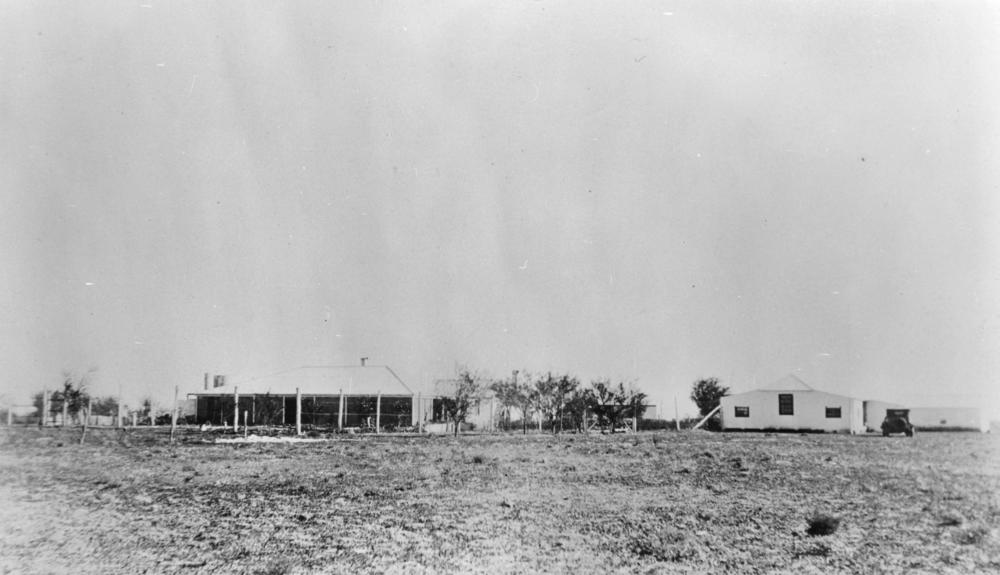
Coorabulka Station homestead 1929

Coorabulka Station, most commonly known as Coorabulka, is a pastoral lease that operates as a cattle station in Queensland, Australia.

== Description ==
Coorabulka is located about 99 kilometres (62 mi) south east of Boulia and 259 kilometres (161 mi) north of Birdsville in Central West Queensland. It is located in the Channel Country between the Diamantina and Georgina Rivers.

The property occupies an area of 6,370 square kilometres (2,459 sq mi) and is capable of carrying approximately 8,000 head of cattle. It is used as a grower property for weaners as part of the North Australian Pastoral Company. It is mostly composed of open downs vegetated with Mitchell and Flinders grasses with about a quarter of the property made up of floodplains. The station is bordered by another NAPCo. property, Marion Downs, to the west and Monkira to the south.

== History ==
The station was established on Rakkaia tribal lands prior to 1882 and was owned by a Mr Ferguson in 1883 who was fattening cattle on the land at the time. The following year the property was owned by Ferguson, Woods and Co. and sent a mob of 1,700 head of cattle south to market after a good season. By 1890 the owners were Wellington, Woods and Ferguson.

The property was placed on the market in 1900. At this time it had an area of 482 square miles (1,248 km^{2}) and was carrying 2,552 head of cattle and 144 horses. The property was later withdrawn from sale. The first signs of rabbits having reached the station were found in early 1900. Messrs Collins, White and Co. bought the station later in 1900. The new owners sank the first bore at the property in 1901 which was sunk to a depth of 680 feet (207 m) and recorded a flow of over a million gallons.

In 1904 the station was "nearly washed away" by heavy flooding that occurred following unusually heavy rains. The station recorded 9 inches (229 mm) of rain over the course of a week. The Diamantina River and Farrar Creek were both in "big flood". Later the same year the station manager, Mr. Nicholls, had contractors sink the station's sixth bore and struck a "sensational flow" of artesian water, that rose 6 feet (1.8 m) over the casing and was producing an estimated three million gallons daily.

Sold for £24,000 in 1933, the property had been initially put up for auction with Chatsworth and Noranside stations but no bids were received. John Collins and sons then placed a separate bid for Coorabulka alone; the 2,500 head of cattle and 100 horses were included as part of the sale. The Collins family also partly owned Glenormiston Station.

The station was sold in 1939 by John Collins and sons to the Monkir Pastoral Company. At the time the property was 3,013 square miles (7,804 km^{2}) in size and was made up of three leases (Coorabulka, Breadalbane and Mount Tarley) stocked with 6,700 head of shorthorn cattle and 166 horses. Both Monkira and Coorabulka were acquired by the North Australian Pastoral Company the same year as part of their plan to breed cattle at Alexandria Station in the Northern Territory and then fatten and sell from the Channel Country.

A rat plague caused considerable damage at Coorabulka and the surrounding areas in 1940. The station manager estimated that 4,000 square miles (10,360 km^{2}) of grazing lands was ruined by the plague with grass roots being destroyed and young trees being debarked. Reports came from travellers seeing mobs of thousands of rats along the roads.

The Green family, who were living at Coorabulka, had to be rescued from the property in 1949 when it was severely flooded. The family were menaced by floodwaters in the homestead for 36 hours before being reached by two rescue parties, one on horseback and the second on an improvised raft built from a water trough and petrol drums. The rescue was prompted when the Greens made a fading telephone call saying "they were up to their armpits in water and trying to reach the roof".

In an effort to conserve water being wasted from the Great Artesian Basin ten bores were capped at Coorabulka in 2007. The station manager of the time, Alistair Malone, commented that A$1.5 million had been spent capping bores and installing new pipework and storage tanks.

John Powell was appointed station manager in 2009 and runs the station along with wife Tracey and eight other employees. The Powells came from neighbouring Marion Downs where they had managed the Herbert Downs outstation.

== See also ==
- List of ranches and stations
- List of the largest stations in Australia
