= Wanggamala language =

Extinct Australian Aboriginal language

Wanggamala
- Wangka-Yutjurru
- Wangga-Manha
- Native to: Australia
- Region: Northern Territory, Central West Queensland
- Ethnicity: Wongkamala, Julaolinja, Lanima, Rungarungawa, Wongkadjera
- Native speakers: 1 (2003)
- Language family: Pama–Nyungan: Karnic; Palku; Wanggamala
- Dialects: Wangka-Yutjurru; Wankamanha (Tharlimanha, Wangga-Manha)

Language codes
- ISO 639-3: Variously: wnm – Wanggamanha wky – Wangkayutyuru lnw – Lanima
- Glottolog: wang1289 Wanggamala
- AIATSIS: C9
- ELP: Wanggamala

Wanggamala, also spelt Wanggamanha, Wangkamahdla, Wangkamadla, Wangkamanha, Wangkamana, Wonkamala, Wongkamala, Wonkamudla, and other variants, is an extinct Australian Aboriginal language of the Pama–Nyungan family, previously spoken in the Northern Territory around Hay River (east of Alice Springs) and to the south of the Andegerebinha-speaking area.

As of 2003, there was one speaker remaining.

According to Gavan Breen (2007), Lanima (AIATSIS code G52) and Yurlayurlanya (formerly spelt Ulaolinya) are groups whose dialect is Wangkamanha G1, or possibly two names for the same group. Other linguists have offered different interpretations of the dialects.

Wangka-Yutjurru (AIATSIS G5) is a separate language (also Karnic, according to Luise Hercus), according to Gavan Breen, which has two dialects, Wangka-Yutjurru and Wangkamanha. Other linguists suggest further dialects.

== Alternative names ==
- Tharlimanha (Breen 2007)
- Wanggamala (AIATSIS and Ethnologue)
- Wanggamanha
- Wangkamadla
- Wangkamahdla
- Wangkamala
- Wangkamana (Horton, after Tindale; Blake & Breen 1971)
- Wangkamanha
- Wonggaman (AIAS)
- Wonggawan
- Wongkamala (Tindale)
- Wonkamala (Tindale 1974)
- Wonkamudla(Tindale 1974; O'Grady et al. 1996; Mathews)
