= Kalkatungu language =

Extinct Australian Aboriginal language

Kalkatungu
- Native to: Australia
- Region: Mount Isa area, Queensland
- Ethnicity: Kalkadoon people
- Extinct: after 1979, with the death of Lardie Moonlight
- Revival: exist
- Language family: Pama–Nyungan: Kalkatungic; Kalkatungu
- Signed forms: Kalkutungu Sign Language

Language codes
- ISO 639-3: ktg
- Glottolog: kalk1246
- AIATSIS: G13
- ELP: Kalkatungu

Kalkatungu (also Kalkutungu, Galgadungu, Kalkutung, Kalkadoon, or Galgaduun) is an extinct Australian Aboriginal language formerly spoken around the area of Mount Isa and Cloncurry, Queensland.

== Classification ==
Apart from the closely related language, Wakabunga, Kalkatungu is sometimes grouped with Yalarnnga as the Kalkatungic (Galgadungic) branch of the Pama–Nyungan family. O'Grady et al., however, classify it as the sole member of the "Kalkatungic group" of the Pama-Nyungan family, and Dixon (2002) regards Kalkatungic as an areal group.

== Revival ==
Emeritus Professor Barry Blake, Sheree Blackley and others have revived the language based on recordings, written grammars and personal memories. Robert Ah Wing, assisted by Uncle Arthur Peterson is also active in this field. Often, emphasis is placed on belonging, passing on elements of language to younger Kalkatungu.

== Phonology ==
=== Vowels ===
	Front	Back
High	i iː	u uː
Low	a aː	

=== Consonants ===
	Peripheral		Laminal		Apical	
	Bilabial	Velar	Palatal	Dental	Alveolar	Retroflex
Stop	p	k	c	t̪	t	ʈ
Nasal	m	ŋ	ɲ	n̪	n	ɳ
Lateral			ʎ	l̪	l	ɭ
Vibrant					r	
Approximant	w		j		ɻ	

It is not clear if the vibrant is a trill or a tap.

== Stress ==
Like in English, word stress is realised in terms of loudness. Sentence stress is also organised similar to English with the first syllable in the final word of a phonological phrase getting the main stress. (tonic stress) Moreover, if there are more than two words in a phrase, the first syllable of the first word receives more stress than the non-final words.

== Vocabulary ==
Below is a basic vocabulary list from Blake (1981).

English	Kalkatungu
man	yurru
woman	marabai
mother	mardu
father	kurla
head	kaṉṯa
eye	miḻṯi
nose	ityintyi
ear	iṉṯa
mouth	aṉṯa
tongue	marli
tooth	ardiṉḏa
hand	magaṯi
breast	mimi
stomach	putu
urine	kurkai
faeces	unu
thigh	nguḻṯu
foot	ṯapandu
bone	kunka
blood	ultyi
dog	ṯugu
snake	ṯuat
kangaroo	matyumba
possum	mirramba
fish	wakari
spider	kubu
mosquito	migara
emu	udingat
eaglehawk	uḻuyan
crow	waagarla
sun	pintyamu
moon	tuṉḏal
star	tyirka
stone	ndia
water	kuu
camp	muu
fire	utyan
smoke	purlu
food	maa
meat	adi
stand	nanbi
sit	ini
see	na-
go	ingga
get	mani
hit, kill	ḻai
I	ngai
you	nyini
one	ayat
two	lyuwadi

== Kalkatungu Sign Language ==
Kendon (1988) shows that Kalkatungu also had a developed signed form of their language.
