= North Australian Pastoral Company =

Australian cattle company

North Australian Pastoral Company Pty Ltd
- Type: Private
- Industry: Agriculture
- Founded: 1877
- Founder: (See text)
- Headquarters: Brisbane, Queensland, Australia
- Products: Beef cattle
- Owner: Queensland Investment Corporation (80%)
- Number of employees: 180
- Website: http://www.napco.com.au/

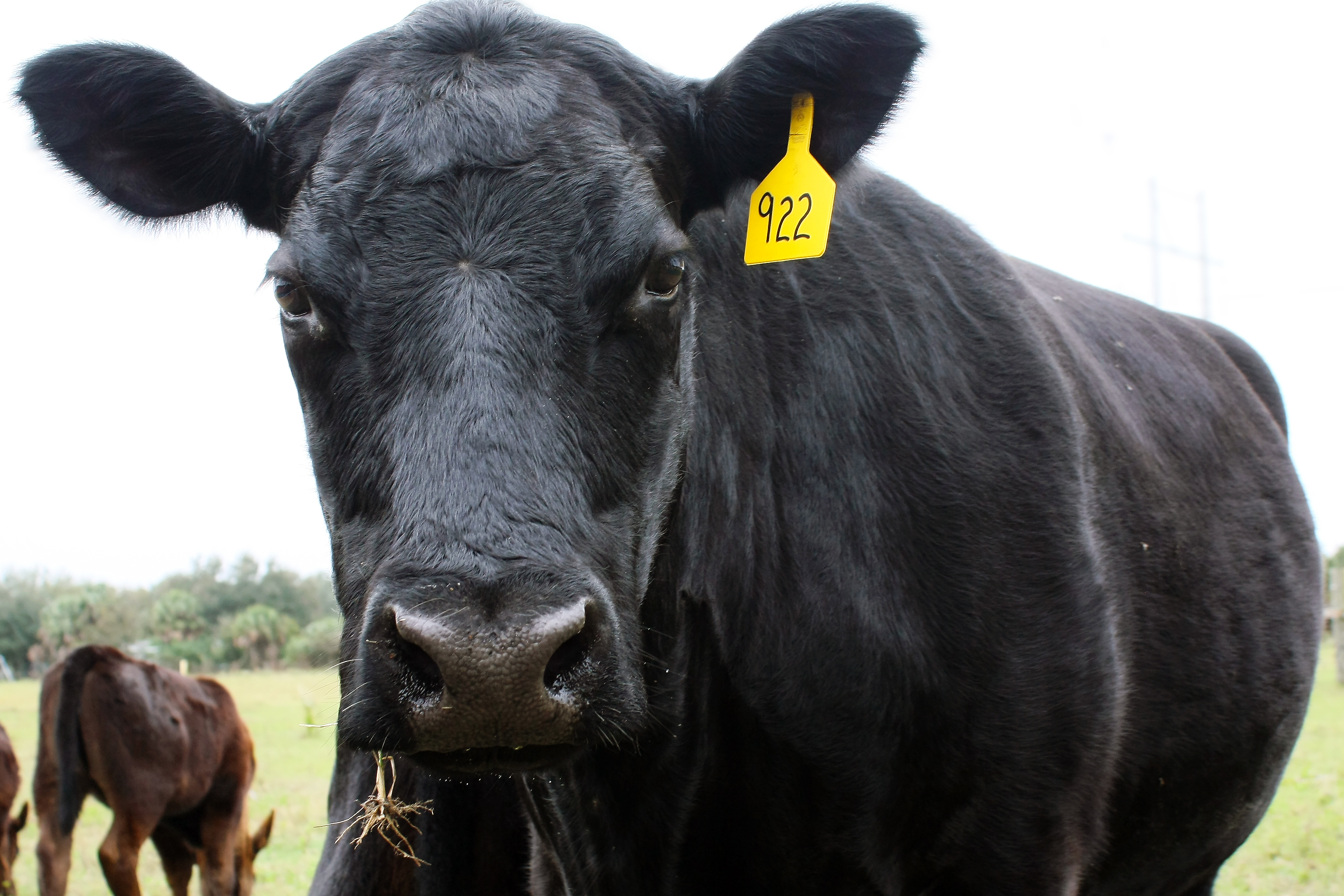
Angus cow: the common species utilised by livestock farmers in Australia and particularly by NAPCO in its composite breeding program.

The North Australian Pastoral Company (NAPCO) is a large, privately owned, Australian cattle company which operates 14 cattle stations (as well as the Wainui farm and feedlot) covering over 60,000 km^{2}, managing around 200,000 cattle, throughout Queensland and the Northern Territory. It produces beef cattle which are pasture raised and grain finished before sale to Australian meat processors, who onsell beef to domestic and international customers.

== Introduction ==
The North Australian Pastoral Company (NAPCO) is an Australian cattle company, founded in 1877. It was originally established in the Barkly Tableland in the Northern Territory before expanding to Queensland as the company developed. It is one of Australia's oldest cattle companies and is today, a leading national beef producer in the Australian cattle industry. The company has a variety of stations throughout the Northern Territory and Queensland. Northern Territory stations include those such as Alexandria and Mittiebah, whilst Queensland stations encompass those such as Boomarra, Kynuna and Portland Downs. The company is most well known for its development of the Alexandria and Kynuna cattle composites which are species of cattle that are distinct to NAPCO and separate it from others in the pastoral industry.

== Overview of the North Australian Pastoral Company ==
Founded in 1877 the North Australian Pastoral Company is one of Australia's leading agricultural enterprises as well as being one of its oldest and largest. NAPCO’S rangelands span 6.1 million hectares across both Queensland and the Northern Territory where a variety of stations have been established. The company is currently in possession of cattle heads amounting to some 190,000 cows spread throughout each station from Queensland to the Northern Territory. There are currently twelve stations located in Queensland, and only two located in the Northern Territory. However, whilst Queensland contains more stations in comparison to the Northern Territory, its capacity of cattle is far less. For example, the Goldsborough station in Queensland only holds a capacity of 4,000 cattle, whereas the Northern Territory station of Mittiebah holds an approximate capacity of 80,000 cows.

The company's standing in the Australian agricultural industry is attributed to its advanced composite breeding programs, from which it has developed two of its own registered cattle species known as the Alexandria composite and Kynuna composite. The company has also engaged in an Environmental Management System (EMS) which is a policy implementation that aims to reduce carbon emissions by engaging in environmentally sound beef production. By introducing an Environmental Management Strategy, the company is in step with the work of fellow pastoralists operating in the Northern Rangeland industry who have also implemented a particular model of EMS to specifically target the impact they have on the environment.

Northern Territory: location where the North Australian Pastoral company was founded and home to its major cattle stations.

== History ==
The NAPCO partnership was formed in 1877 by Queenslanders William Collins, William Forrest and Sir Thomas McIlwraith, with Englishmen John Warner and Sir William Ingram. The first station acquired was Alexandria Downs in the Northern Territory.

Francis Foster invested in NAPCO in 1937 taking an 18% interest, which grew through his lifetime to 43%. His descendants eventually acquired a majority 51% stake in the company.

Monkira and Coorabulka were acquired in 1939 as part of their plan to breed cattle at Alexandria and then fatten and sell from the Channel Country.

In 1968 the company acquired Glenormiston along with the adjoining property, Marion Downs, at about the same time.

In 1990, the Australian Financial Review reported that the company controlled over 45,000 square kilometres (17,000 mi^{2}) of pastoral leases in the Northern Territory and Queensland, as well as four grazing properties in Tasmania.

In May 2016, Queensland Investment Corporation acquired a 79% interest in NAPCO with the Foster family owning the remaining 21%.

In 2016 NAPCO was inducted into the Queensland Business Leaders Hall of Fame.

In January 2020 NAPCO announced it was purchasing Mantuan Downs, a large-scale cattle breeding and finishing property in Central Queensland. The 134,000-hectare (330,000-acre) property consists of two pastoral leases, known as Mantuan Downs and Castlevale as well as the freehold Semper Idem.

== Properties ==
As at 2017, the company operated the following stations:

- Alexandria Station, Northern Territory
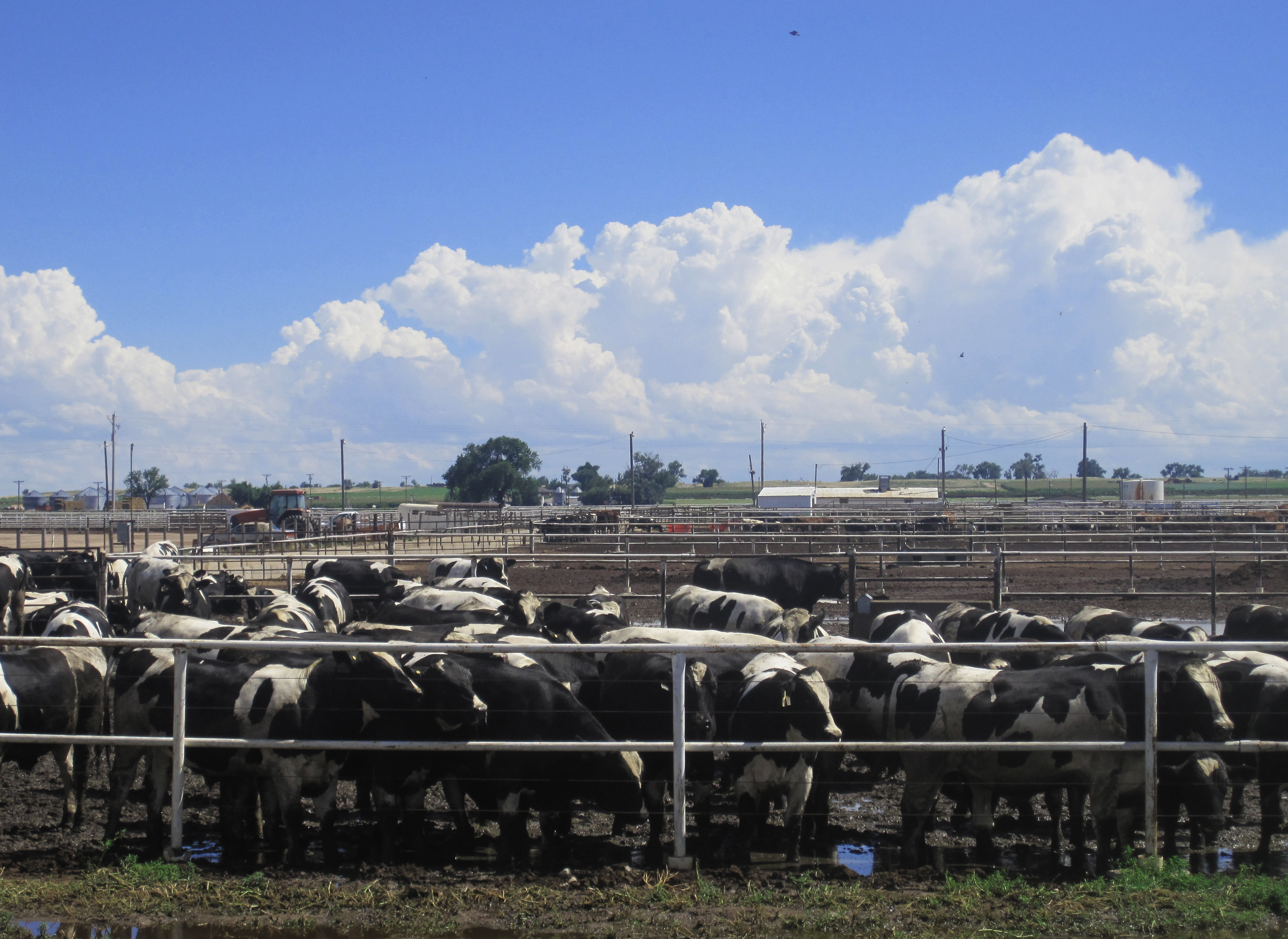
  Example format of a cattle feedlot.
- Boomarra Station, Queensland
- Coolullah Station, Queensland
- Coorabulka Station, Queensland
- Cungelella Station, Queensland
- Glenormiston Station, Queensland
- Goldsborough Station, Queensland
- Kynuna Station (includes Dagworth Station), Queensland
- Landsborough Station, Queensland
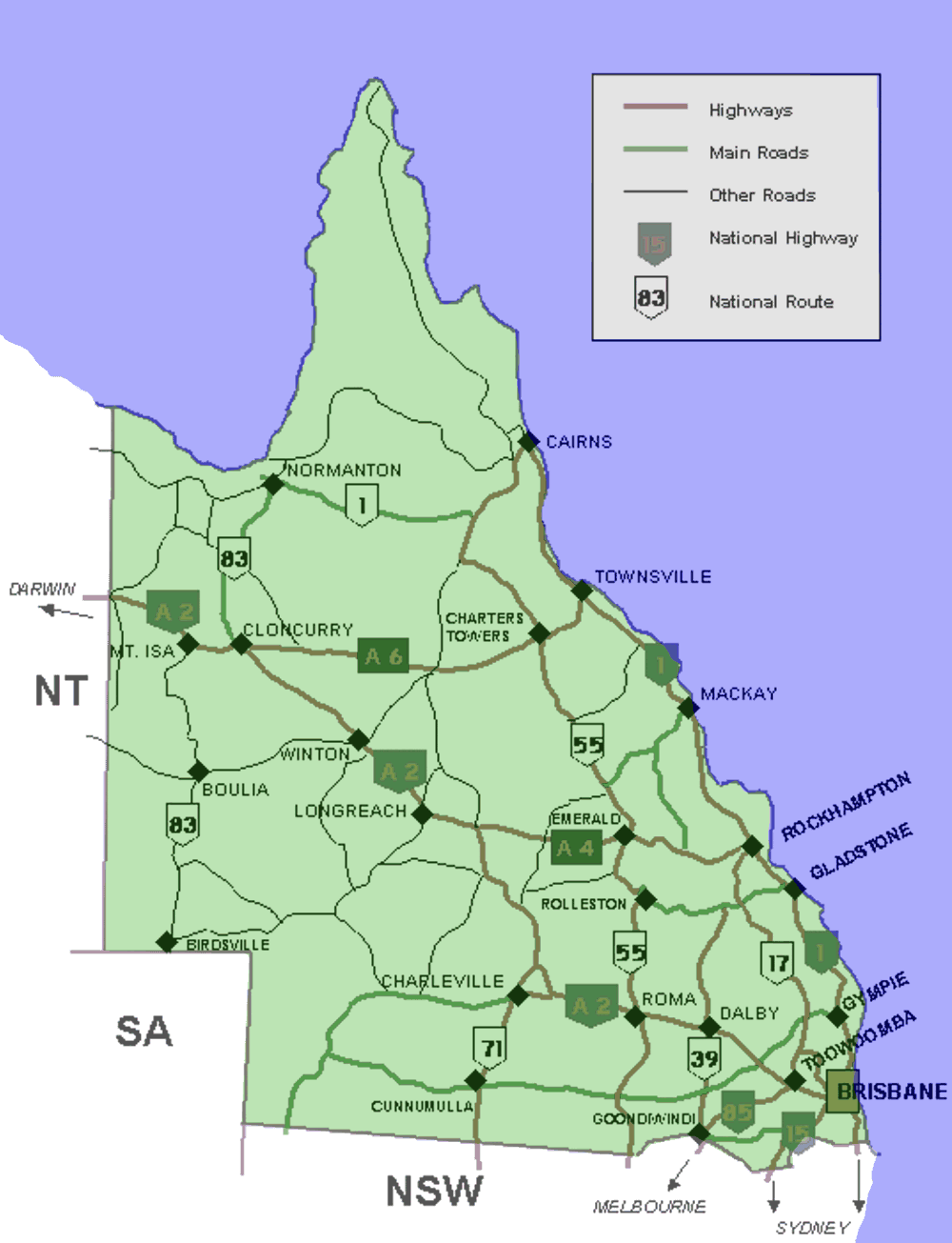
- Map of Queensland: state of Australia where a vast majority of NAPCO stations are located. Some of these stations include Boomarra, Portland Downs and Marion Downs.
  Marion Downs Station, Queensland
- Mittiebah Station, Northern Territory
- Monkira Station, Queensland
- Portland Downs Station, Queensland
- Wainui Feedlot and Farm, Queensland

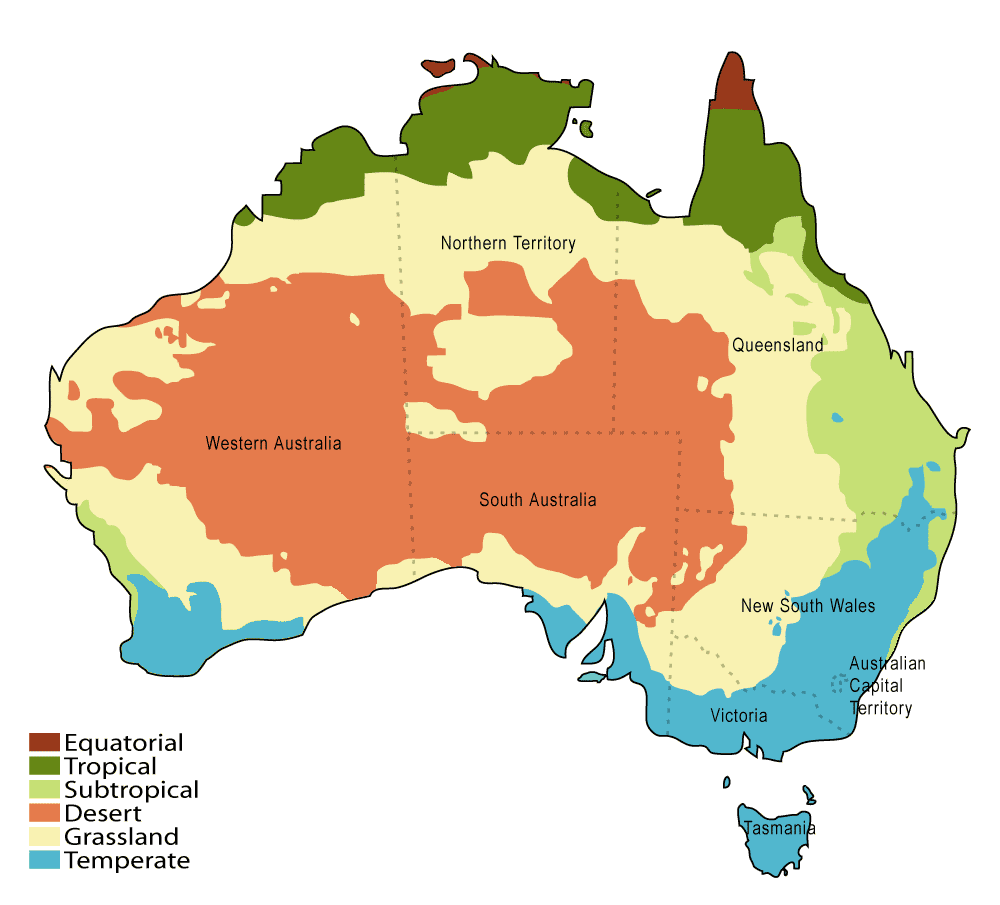
Map of Australia detailing the variations in its climate.

Other properties that the company has owned include:

- Gordon Downs, Queensland

== Livestock feedlots in Australia ==
Feedlots play an integral role in the Australian livestock industry and are strongly influenced by the environment they are in. Only 25% of Australia (including its feedlots) have a growing season of more than 5 months. This is due to the Australian climate being incapable of sustaining crops and pastures over a sustained period of time. Characteristically, cattle and grain supplies are located in close proximity to feedlots, and the 2012 Australian Lot feeders Association Industry survey indicated that feedlot capacity is typically divided into particular sectors.

Whilst the southern states account for 51% of total feedlot capacity in Australia, NSW only possesses 45% of total feedlots. The effect of this feedlot distribution is that the southern states produce 1 266 710 heads of cows whilst NSW only owns 788 625 heads of cattle. These figures demonstrate how environmental and infrastructural conditions must be accounted for throughout Australian pastoral systems, thereby indicating how these influences have had an effect on the Southern and Northern rangeland industry. Further, in the Southern rangelands where there is a growing season of less than 5 months, sheep stations have been implemented to complement the farming of cattle. In comparison, the Northern beef zone takes up 116 million hectares of Australia's total land mass, which equates to 24.3% of the total land mass available; this figure is markedly different form the 265 million hectares consumed by the Southern rangelands (sheep and beef) which amounts to 55.3% of total land mass. The Northern rangelands are operated by multiple companies which occupy more than one station.

=== Species of cattle utilised ===
NAPCO began developing composite cow breeds in 1982 when they created the Alexandria composite by breeding Braham Bulls and Shorthorn cow herds. The Alexandria composite is a species of cow that is specific to the NAPCO. The composite was developed at NAPCO's Alexandria station in the Northern Territory. The Alexandria station possess a land mass of 1,641,416 hectares which are home to some 80,000 of the company's cattle. It exhibits features such as a stronger carcass yield, reduced fat cover, improved temperament and environmental adaptation, as well as improved fertility. The Barkalay Tableland in Australia's Northern Rangeland industry is home to 3,000 Alexandria composites. In 1995 NAPCO also developed the Kynuna composite which is a product of the remaining Shorthorn Herd that were bread with Braham Bulls to produce the Alexandria composite. The Boomarra station in Queensland is the breeding headquarters for the company's Kynuna composite. It is currently in possession of 10,000 individual cows which NAPCO distributes amongst its other properties. The development of the Kynuna composite also utilised Tuli and Red Angus cows, breeding them with Shorthorn species. The composites are closely monitored according to three particular traits; reproductive rates, pasture and feedlot growth. The company also partakes in a carcass assessment which draws upon data extracted from analysing feedlot trials and the specie's overall climate durability. Female Kynunas are culled if they fall out of sync with regular times for calving, and therefore are without calves for an extended period of time. Bulls are also closely monitored, with particular attention given to testicle size, physical structure, feet composition and growth which is based on a predominantly grass based diet.

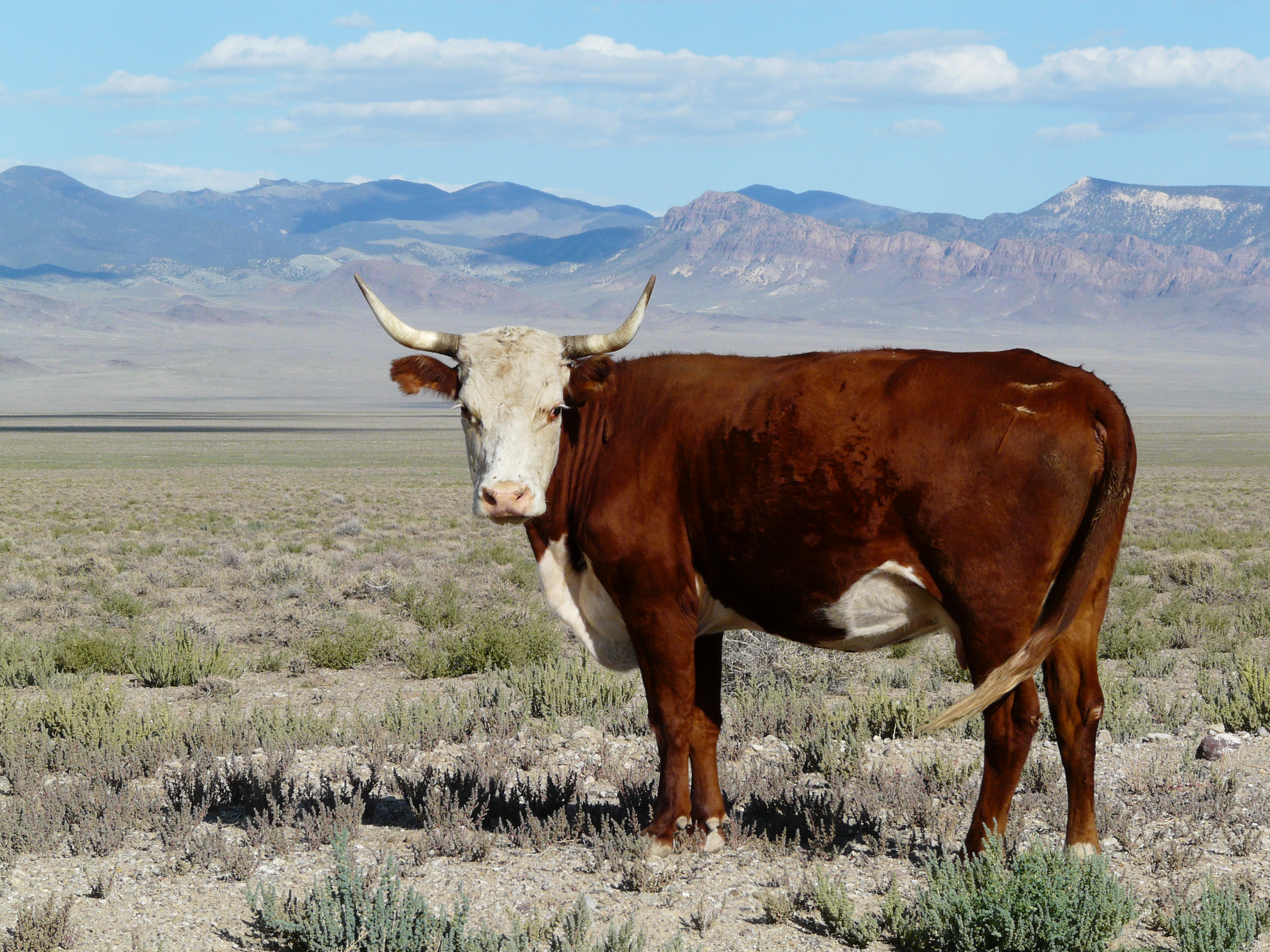
Hereford cow: a particular species of cow used by NAPCO. It is particularly used in the Southern Rangelands where it is bred with Angus species in the development of their composite cow breeds.

=== Species utilised in the Southern Rangelands ===
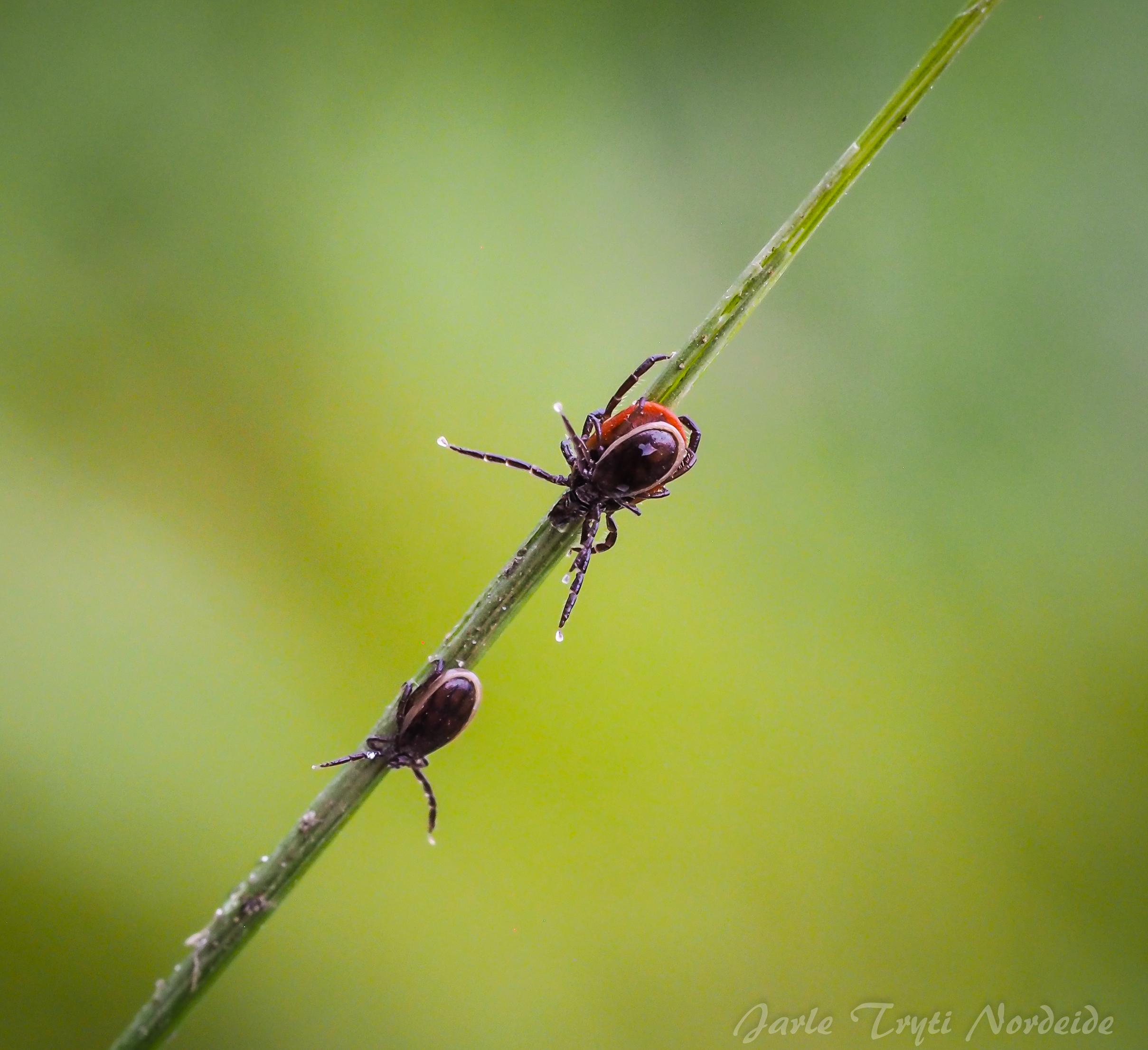
Ixodes recinus: a variation of tick which can compromise the health of cattle. NAPCO's development of the Knyuna composite possesses a stronger tick resistance in comparison to the Angus and Hereford cattle variations previous relied on by the company.

Contrary to the Northern rangelands where NAPCO operates is the Southern rangeland industry. Angus and Hereford cow breeds are the customary species of cattle utilised in these rangelands. However, since the 1980s European breeds such as the Charolis and Limousine were introduced The introduction of these European breeds comes from their high growth rates and ability to sustain a heavy weight despite their age as the cows grow older. Like the Northern rangeland industry, the South has also introduced crossbreeding to develop composite breeds. Hereford cattle species are typically the traditional species the industry relies upon, due to the breed's climate suitability, heat tolerance and strong tick resistance. The Hereford species is well suited to both grain finishing and grasses as its primary form of sustenance, and for that reason is also able to produce high quality and dense carcasses. In the 1990s the Wagyu breed was introduced in the Southern rangelands and grew in popularity the next few years due to the marbling of their meat and pattern of maturation which is comparatively later to that of the other species that was being used in the Southern rangeland. Although the number of Wagyu cattle is low in comparison to other breeds in South Australia, crossbreeding programs between Wagyu bulls and Angus cows have been used to accelerate the dissemination of Wagyu genes.

== Overview of the Australian Feedlot Sector ==
The Australian cattle industry is responsible for producing 3.9% of world beef productivity and due to 60% of the nation's entire beef production being exported, Australia operates alongside America and Brazil as one of the largest beef exporters worldwide. Slaughter rates in the Australian feedlot sector tend to increase during drought periods which can last for a number of years. This is due to the limited availability of grain which the onset of drought brings with it, meaning that feedlots are generally lacking in activity during this time. The Southern rangelands typically operate their feedlots by running smaller herds via more intense operations compared to the Northern rangeland sector.

The vast majority of Australian feedlot production falls in Queensland and the Northern Territory. The use of these feedlots has grown substantially since 1980 and the industry is currently able to feed over 1 million cattle in feedlots at once. The increasing use of feedlots in Australia is due to a consumerist demand for grass fed beef. Feedlot sectors are typically characterised by climates where crops and pastures are able to survive and typically consist of vegetation where short term crops such as wheat, oats and barley and long term crops such as clover can survive Australia's subterranean climate where conditions will endure for over 5 months. Further, this also encompasses those months where the ratio of rainfall and evaporation exceeds 1 cm and where the average monthly temperature exceeds 7 degrees.

=== Australia’s Northern Rangeland Industry ===
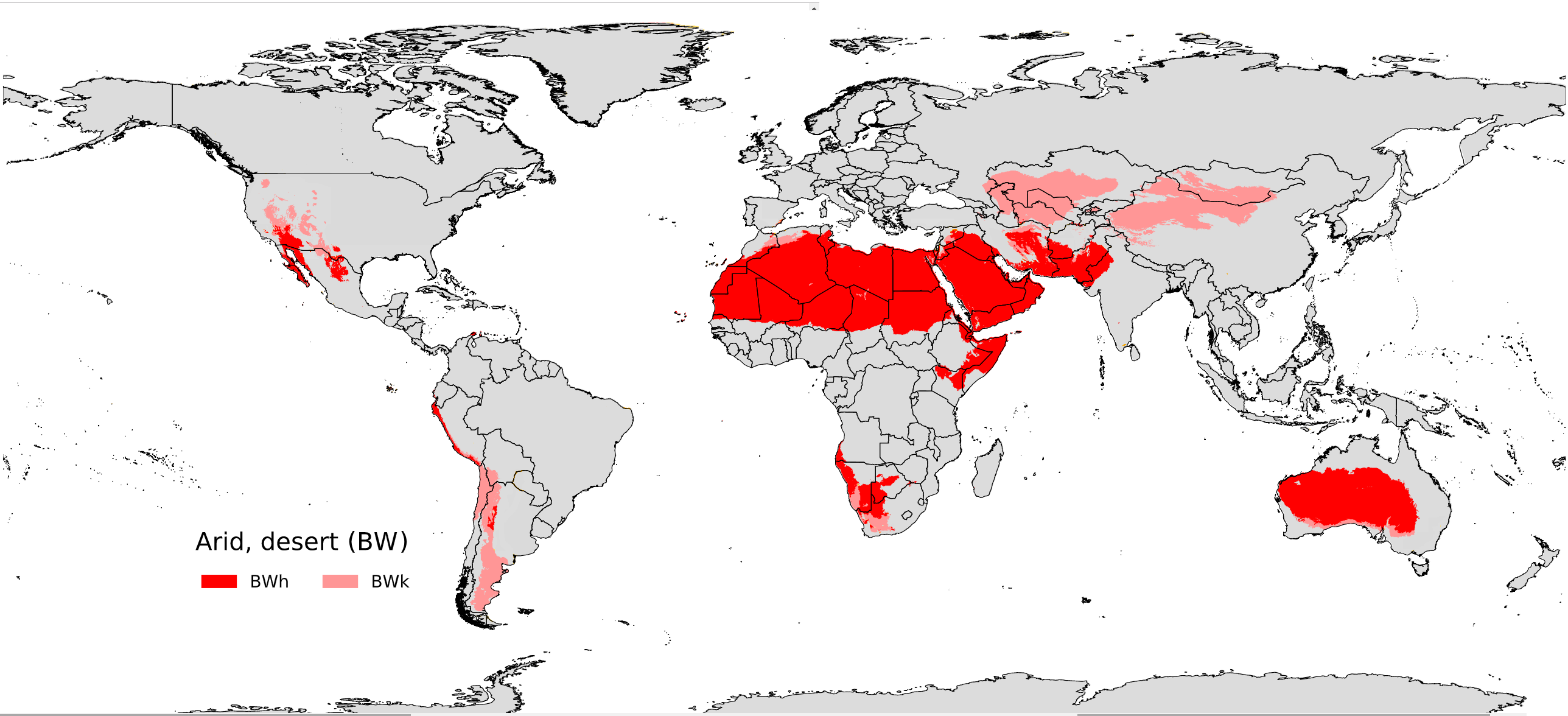
Graph showing the distribution of arid climates throughout the globe.

Australian rangelands cover approximately 75% of the nation's land mass. Characteristically arid and semi arid the rangelands offer wide variations in climate, land and soil. The pastoral industry and particularly pastoral practices equate to 60% of rangeland usage. Subsequently, Australia's 25.5 million beef cattle generate a gross average of $7.4 million per year. The Northern Rangelands are the centre for beef productivity in Australia, producing 70% of national beef in the year 2005–2006. The grazing of cattle is the primary use of Australia's Northern Rangelands, and as such, it has enabled them to become a central organ for Australian agricultural enterprises. The production of beef in these rangelands draws upon a traditional low input-low output system of land management. Australia's Northern rangelands have engaged in recent innovations to increase beef productivity whilst reducing greenhouse gas emissions. These strategies include; improving herd genetics, utilising feed bases, and promoting both feedlot finishing and property infrastructure. Species of cows such as the Red Angus, Tuli, Belmont Reds, Senapol and Brahman bulls are common species utilised in the Northern Rangeland industry for sustained productivity and carcass yields given Australia's arid and semi arid climate.

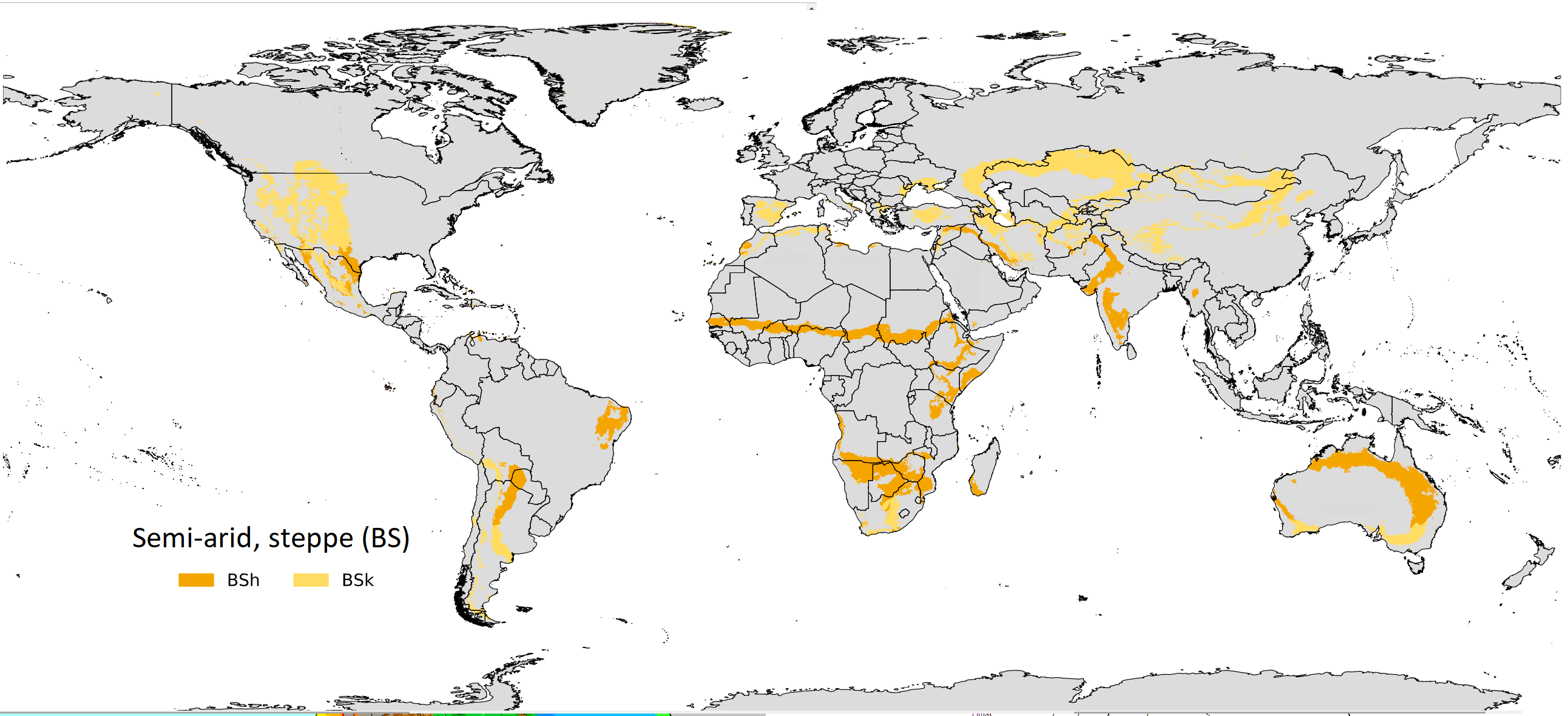
Graph showing the distribution of semi-arid climates throughout the globe.

NAPCO has adopted these strategies and complemented them by utilising solar energy systems, perennial pastures and minimum tillage to increase productivity and limit carbon emissions. Further, the company has significantly contributed to developing a genetic improvement program which has introduced a tropically adapted cattle breed which has improved fertility and growth. NAPCO's composite cattle breeds, the Alexandria and Kynuna composites, are suited to arid and semi arid climates which are the product of the environmental conditions in the northern rangelands. The composite cattle proves to be more durable compared to the Shorthorn cow variations, due to their increased drought and disease resistance and heat tolerance. The composites are a more profitable long term species for NAPCO that has ensured beef productivity has been maintained whilst minimising environmental degradation.

== Environmental Management Systems ==
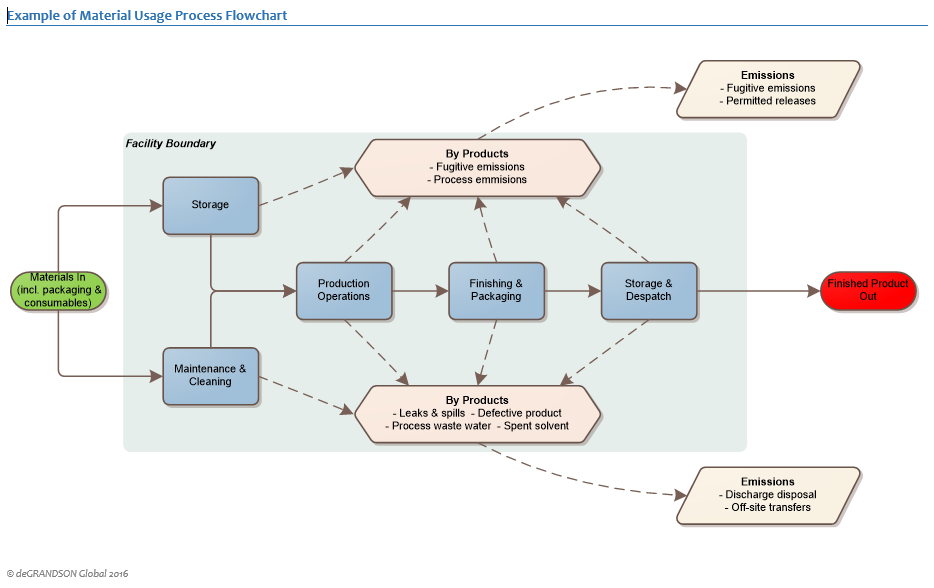
ISO 14001: Infographic providing a practical example of the ISO 14001 level of Environmental Management being applied to distribution of material usage.

In the year 2000 Meat and Livestock Australia (MLA) initiated a pilot group of beef and cattle farmers to partake in an environmental management system that would be soon implemented into the cattle industry. The standard aimed for the pilot group was ISO 14001 which is the current system standard for principal management systems and particularises the requirements for the introduction and maintenance of an environmental management system. During this period of development, Commonwealth and state governments who had been promoting EMS models in the agricultural sector began to introduce these methods to the nation's red meat industry.

=== Current EMS used in Australia ===
Currently, the Australian agricultural industry follows various models of Environmental Management Systems (EMS) which provides an environmental management service tool that assists the continued improvement of Australia's natural habitat. However, there is a significant financial cost involved in EMS strategies that can provide obstacles that make it difficult to maintain these initiatives. This is currently being achieved by way of a four tier approach which aims to cultivate the environment and ensure its longevity. The four tiered approach concerns an initial environmental self-assessment, secondly an environmental check-list, and then complementing the second step by following an industry standard of EMS and lastly by implementing a certified EMS that is to the ISO 14001.

=== NAPCO’s EMS development ===
NAPCO was the first company which was able to progress to registration of final 14001 certification. This was primarily due to the increased costs of surveillance audits and an absence of market incentives to promote this certificate as the gold standard within the Australian beef industry. A ‘cluster approach’ was utilised by the company when working towards certification; this meant that the entire company qualified for certification, rather than each individual worker. The effect of the ‘cluster approach’ was to reduce the substantive cost involved in certification and the subsequent surveillance audits that would have to be implemented; this meant that cost was able to be reduced by approximately 50%. This approach also provided a means by which workload and ideas between producers could be collectively distributed.

== See also ==
- List of oldest companies in Australia
- Cattle, Agriculture, Farming, Livestock, Pasture
- Australian States and Territories, New South Wales, Queensland
- Environmental Management, Environment, Sustainability, Management

== Bibliography ==
1. Agriculture and Resource Management Council of Australia and New Zealand, “Prediction of Food Intake” In Feeding Standards for Australian Livestock; Ruminants (CSIRO Publishing, 1990) 261.
2. Bentley, David, Hegarty, Rodger and Alford, Andrew, “Managing Livestock Enterprises in Australia’s Extensive Rangelands for Greenhouse Gas and Environmental Outcomes: A Pastoral Company Perspective,” Australian Journal of Experimental Agriculture 2, no. 48, (January 2008) 60–64.
3. Brightling, Anthony, Brightling, Tony and Fowler, Diane, "Issues with Cattle" In Livestock Diseases in Australia; Diseases of Cattle, Sheep, Goats and Farm Dogs (C.H. Jerram & Associates, 2006) 21.
4. Buckley, David, The Cattle Parasite Atlas; A Regional Guide to Cattle Parasite Control in Australia (CSIRO publishing, 2005) 32.
5. Cranston, Michael, “Leading Cattle Company The North Australian Pastoral” The North Queensland Register, 13 September 2012, 5.
6. Commonwealth Scientific and Industrial Research Organization for the Australian Agricultural Council, Australian Journal of Experimental Agriculture and Animal Husbandry, (Cornell University Publishers, 1979) 261.
7. Denniss, Siobhan, A Critique of Environmental Management Systems and their Relevance in the North Australian Pastoral Industry (Melbourne: MTEM Publishers, 2002) 28.
8. Derner, Justin D, “Livestock Production Systems,” in Rangeland Systems: Processes, Management and Challenges, ed. David D. Briske, (Springer International Publishing: 2017) 347.
9. Dundon, Peter, "Feedlots" In The Australian Feedlot Directory, (Elders Press Ltd, 1994) 12; Quevedo Martin Morgan, “The Beef Cattle Industry” In Australia's Livestock and Meat Industry, (Urbana-Champaign: University of Illinois Press, 1971) 2.
10. Eldridge, David J, Poore, Alistair G. B, Ruiz-Colmenero, Marta, Letnic, Mike and Soliveres, Santiago, “Ecosystem structure, function, and composition in rangelands are negatively affected by livestock grazing” In Ecological Applications, Vol. 26 No. 4 (Ecological Society of America, 2016) 1273–1283.
11. Gerber, Pierre, Mooney, Harold A. and Dijkman, Jeroen “Livestock in a Changing Landscape” In Experiences and Regional Perspectives, Vol. 2 (Stanford: Island Press, 2010) 23.
12. Gerrard, Marjorie A and O’Leary, Patrick, “Union-Avoidance Strategies in the Meat Industry in Australia and the United States” In Frontiers of Labor: Comparative Histories of the United States and Australia, ed. Greg Patmore, (Illinois: University of Illinois Press, 2018), 129.
13. Kahn, Lewis and Cottle, David John, “Beef Composition of the Northern Beef Herd” In Beef Cattle Production and Trade (CSIRO publishing, 2014) 180.
14. Lesslie, Rob and Mewett, Jodie, “Land Use and Management - The Australian Context” in Land Use in Australia: Past, Present and Future, ed. Richard Trackway (Australian National University Press, 2018) 31.
15. Meat and Livestock Australia, “Composite Breeds in the Northern Rangelands” In Beef Cattle Nutrition; An Introduction to the Essentials, (Meat and Livestock Australia, 2006) 76.
16. Millard, Steve “Experiences with Composites: North Australia Pastoral Company (NAPCO)” Armidale Feeder Steer School; Conference Proceedings and Support Material no.1 (August 2003): 131–133.
17. M. Moore, Raymond, “Proceedings” In Australian Grasslands, (Australian National University Press, 1970) 22.
18. Pearson, Michael, “Exploring in the 1860s and 1870s,” in Pastoral Australia: Fortunes, Failures and Hard Yakka: A Historical Overview 1788–1967 ed Jane Lennon, (Collingwood: CSIRO publishing, 2010) 103–106.
19. Phillips, Amy, “NAPCO for sale; The North Australian Pastoral Company, One of the Largest Cattle Producers and Landholders in Northern Australia, is for Sale” ABC Regional News NSW, 13 May 2013, 3.
20. Reid, Robert L, "Agriculture and the Economy" from The Manual of Australian Agriculture (Butterworths publishers, 1990) 1.
21. Velado-Alonso, Elena, Morales-Castilla, Ignacio, Rebollo, Salvador and Gómez-Sal, Antonio, “Relationships between the distribution of wildlife and livestock diversity” In Diversity and Distributions, Vol. 26 No. 10, (Wiley Publishers, 2010) 1264.
