= Lanima people =

Aboriginal Australian people

The Lanima were an indigenous people of the state of Queensland.

== Language ==
Almost nothing is known of the Lanima language, apart from a suggestion that it was called Wanggamana.

== Country ==
The Lanima had, in Norman Tindale's estimation, some 3,500 square miles (9,100 km^{2}) of land centered around the area of the Mulligan River north of Kaliduwarry Waterhole.

== Alternative names ==
- Wanggamanha (language name)
- Wonggaman

== Sources ==
- "AIATSIS map of Indigenous Australia". AIATSIS. 28 July 2023.
- Tindale, Norman Barnett (1974). "Lanima (QLD)". Aboriginal Tribes of Australia: Their Terrain, Environmental Controls, Distribution, Limits, and Proper Names. Australian National University.
