= Gavan Breen =

Australian linguist

Gavan Breen (22 January 1935 – 5 October 2023) AO, also known as J. G. Breen, was an Australian linguist, specialising in the description of Australian Aboriginal languages. He studied and recorded 49 such languages.

== Early life and education ==
Breen was born at St Arnaud in the Wimmera district of the state of Victoria on 22 January 1935.

He received his secondary education at St Patrick's College, Ballarat (1948–1952), where he matriculated as Dux in his final year. He went on to study at Newman College, graduating as a metallurgist from Melbourne University.

== Career ==
He was thinking of somewhere to take a holiday break and a job when, in 1967, he chanced to listen to a public lecture at his university in which the need to record dying languages was mentioned. The work was well paid, and Breen took a grant to do a master's degree at Monash University, working initially with the last speakers of the Warluwarra language, including Ida Toby, and later with the Woorabinda people, before deciding that this was where his vocation lay.

He was appointed a research fellow at Monash, and there worked on the Bidjara and sv:Gungabula languages and Pitta Pitta with Barry Blake.

Breen's work, which has extended over many distinct language groups in western and central Queensland, the Northern Territory, and South Australia, was mostly done under the auspices of the AIATSIS, of which he was a member. He has studied and recorded 49 such languages. Tasaku Tsunoda has suggested that, having worked with literally dozens of individuals who were the last speakers of a variety of Australian languages, Breen can be said to be the last speaker of the languages he has described, since he retained a working knowledge, if partial, of an otherwise extinct language.

== Honours ==
On 26 January 2016, Breen was awarded the Officer of the Order of Australia.

== Later life, death and legacy ==
Although Breen officially retired in 2001, he continued to work at the Institute for Aboriginal Development in Alice Springs and was still there as of January 2016. He has also offered his expertise in legal cases, helping native peoples establish their claims to native title.

He died on 5 October 2023 in Alice Springs.

Breen helped to salvage many languages, including:

- Warluwarra
- Bidjara
- Gungabula
- The Antekerrepenhe dialect of Upper Arrernte
- The Mayabic languages and dialects
- The Yalarnnga language
- The Innamincka dialect of Yandruwandha

== Selected works ==
- Breen, Gavan (1976), "Ergative, locative and instrumental case inflections : Wangkumara", in Dixon, Robert (ed.), Grammatical categories in Australian languages, Canberra: Australian Institute of Aboriginal Studies, pp. 336–339
- Breen, J. G.; Monash University. Department of Linguistics; Monash University. Thesis (1971), A description of the Waluwara language
- Breen, Gavan (1977), Andegerenbenha vowel phonology
- Breen, Gavan (1981). The Mayi Languages of the Queensland Gulf Country. Australian Institute of Aboriginal Studies. ISBN 978-0-858-83567-2.
- Breen, Gavan (1990). Salvage Studies of Western Queensland Aboriginal Languages. Department of Linguistics, Research School of Pacific Studies. ISBN 978-0-858-83401-9.
- Breen, Gavan; Blake, Barry J. (2007). The grammar of Yalarnnga: a language of western Queensland. Department of Linguistics, Research School of Pacific Studies. ISBN 978-3-110-18429-7.
- Breen, Gavan (2015) [First published 2004]. Innamincka Talk: A grammar of the Innamincka dialect of Yandruwandha. Australian National University. ISBN 978-1-921-93420-9.
- Breen, Gavan (2015) [First published 2004]. Innamincka Words: Yandruwandha dictionary and stories. Australian National University. ISBN 978-1-921-93422-3.
- Breen, Gavan (2016). "W E Roth and the Study of Aboriginal Languages in Queensland". In McDougall, Russell; Davidson, Iain (eds.). The Roth Family, Anthropology, and Colonial Administration. Routledge. pp. 133–155. ISBN 978-1-315-41728-8.

== Notes and references ==
=== References ===
- "Honour for Gavan Breen". Batchelor Institute of Indigenous Tertiary Education. 2016.
- Breen, Gavan (1973). Bidyara and Gungabula: grammar and vocabulary. Monash University.
- Breen, Gavan (1981). The Mayi Languages of the Queensland Gulf Country. Australian Institute of Aboriginal Studies. ISBN 978-0-858-83567-2.
- Breen, Gavan (1990). Salvage Studies of Western Queensland Aboriginal Languages. Department of Linguistics, Research School of Pacific Studies. ISBN 978-0-858-83401-9.
- Breen, Gavan; Blake, Barry J. (2007). The grammar of Yalarnnga: a language of western Queensland. Department of Linguistics, Research School of Pacific Studies. ISBN 978-3-110-18429-7.
- Breen, Gavan (2015a) [First published 2004]. Innamincka Talk: A grammar of the Innamincka dialect of Yandruwandha. Australian National University. ISBN 978-1-921-93420-9.
- Breen, Gavan (2015b) [First published 2004]. Innamincka Words: Yandruwandha dictionary and stories. Australian National University. ISBN 978-1-921-93422-3.
- Breen, Gavan (2016). "W E Roth and the Study of Aboriginal Languages in Queensland". In McDougall, Russell; Davidson, Iain (eds.). The Roth Family, Anthropology, and Colonial Administration. Routledge. pp. 133–155. ISBN 978-1-315-41728-8.
- Nolan, Paul (2016). "Old Boy's Australia Day honour". St Patrick's College, Ballarat.
- O'Donnell, Mietta (2 April 1973). "Bid to save native languages from extinction" (PDF). Monash Reporter.
- Sleath, Emma (24 April 2014). "Veteran linguist's work preserved". ABC News.
- Tsunoda, Tasaku (2005). Endangerment and Language Revitalization: An Introduction. Walter de Gruyter. ISBN 978-3-110-18429-7.
- Volling, Tom (26 January 2016). "Alice man's crusade to save indigenous languages honoured with OAM". Northern Territory News.
