= Kalkatungic languages =

Group of Australian Aboriginal languages

Kalkatungic
- Galgadungic
- Geographic distribution: Australia
- Linguistic classification: Pama–Nyungan: Kalkatungic
- Subdivisions: Kalkatungu; Yalarnnga

Language codes
- Glottolog: galg1238
- Kalkatungic languages (green) among other Pama–Nyungan (tan)

Kalkatungic is a branch of the Pama–Nyungan family,

- Kalkatungu,
- Yalarnnga.

The two languages are not close; Dixon treats them as separate families. A Wakabunga language is often included based on a word list that turned out to be mislabeled Kalkatungu.
