= Marion Downs Station =

Pastoral lease in Queensland

Location in Queensland

Marion Downs Station, often just referred to as Marion Downs, is a pastoral lease that operates as a cattle station in Queensland, Australia.

== Description ==
The station is located about 56 kilometres (35 mi) south west of Boulia and 282 kilometres (175 mi) north of Birdsville in the Channel Country of Central West Queensland. It occupies the entirety of the locality of Amaroo in the Shires of Boulia and Diamantina, extending to a small extent into some of the neighbouring localities.

The property is well watered by the Georgina, Burke, Hamilton and Mulligan Rivers. The land varies from floodplains to open rolling downs vegetated with Mitchell and Flinders grasses and to desert country of the Simpson Desert along the western boundary.

Marion Downs is run in conjunction with the Herbert Downs outstation, employing about 15 people, and together occupy a total area of 12,460 square kilometres (4,811 sq mi). The property is stocked with about 15,000 head of cattle and is currently owned by the North Australian Pastoral Company.

The homestead is located at 23.3667°S 139.65°E, approx 2.7 kilometres (1.7 mi) west of the Boulia Bedourie Road.

== History ==
The station was established in 1877, in the area of Rungarungawa tribal lands along with several other well known properties in the Channel Country as pastoralists expanded westward from the grasslands at the headwaters of the Diamantina. Other properties established at the same time included Glenormiston Station, Headingly Station, Herbert Downs, Noranside and Roxburgh Downs. In 1878 then owner, Mr F. Scarr, sold the property to a New South Wales investor, Mr Andrew Tobin, for £6000 cash. Tobi and company bought the property without any stock and without inspection, so well regarded was the country, thought to be particularly suited to sheep with its "abundance of saline herbage and lime". Tobin thought otherwise and began to stock the area with cattle, buying over 1,000 store cattle in an 1880 sale that were delivered shortly afterwards. One of Tobin's partners in the station, John Leach Manning, died in 1883 leaving Tobin and the last partner, Daniel MacKinnon, with Marion Downs.

The station manager in 1891, George McLeod, committed suicide by cutting his own throat.

By 1893, the property was owned by the MacKinnon brothers (Donald and James) who were still regularly selling bullocks off the property to markets in Adelaide, Rockhampton and Sydney.

In 1900, the property experienced a dry spell and put down two wells to water their cattle. Better conditions soon returned and by 1908 the property was carrying 10,000 head of cattle.

A boundary rider named Andrew Johnstone, employed at neighbouring Coorabulka Station, went missing in 1920. His body was found a couple of months later by a stockman along the Merrdiderri Channel, but his bones had been scattered by dingos. By the following year the property occupied an area of 4,300 square miles (11,137 km^{2}) and was carrying 20,000 cattle with 300 horses.

The area was struck by drought in 1926. Although Marion Downs was faring well in 1926, this changed as the drought continued, and by 1928 the property had been left in the hands of care-takers and had been mostly destocked.

A man from South Australia, Daniel Richardson, died of thirst at Marion Downs in 1932.

The property was purchased by the North Australian Pastoral Company in 1934, following some tough times after World War I, a market downturn and the prolonged drought. Neighbouring Coorabulka and nearby Monkira were purchased in 1939.

The area experienced heavy rains in 1953, and Marion Downs along with other properties nearby were flooded. Many employees trapped at the station contracted dysentery, probably from drinking contaminated water.

The Georgina and Burke Rivers both flooded in 2010, following good rains further north. The station manager, Robert Jansen, described the waters as "handy", probably meaning there would be more water available to stock. Jansen and the manager of Glenormiston Station, Stephen Bryce, have jointly managed the Mulligan River Nature Reserve, which straddles both of the properties, since 2007.

== See also ==
- List of ranches and stations
- List of the largest stations in Australia
