= Rakaya =

Aboriginal Australian people

The Rakkaia were an indigenous Australian people, from what is now Queensland.

== Country ==
The Rakkaia are estimated by Norman Tindale to have had, within their tribal domains, some 2,200 square miles (5,700 km^{2}) of territory, stretching westwards from Coorabulka as far as the Georgina River, and the eastern vicinity of Breadalbane.

== Alternative name ==
- Rukkia.

== Sources ==
- "AIATSIS map of Indigenous Australia". AIATSIS. 14 May 2024.
- Roth, W. E. (1897). Ethnological Studies among the North-West-Central Queensland Aborigines (PDF). Brisbane: Edmund Gregory, Government Printer.
- Tindale, Norman Barnett (1974). "Rakkaia (QLD)". Aboriginal Tribes of Australia: Their Terrain, Environmental Controls, Distribution, Limits, and Proper Names. Australian National University Press. ISBN 978-0-708-10741-6.
