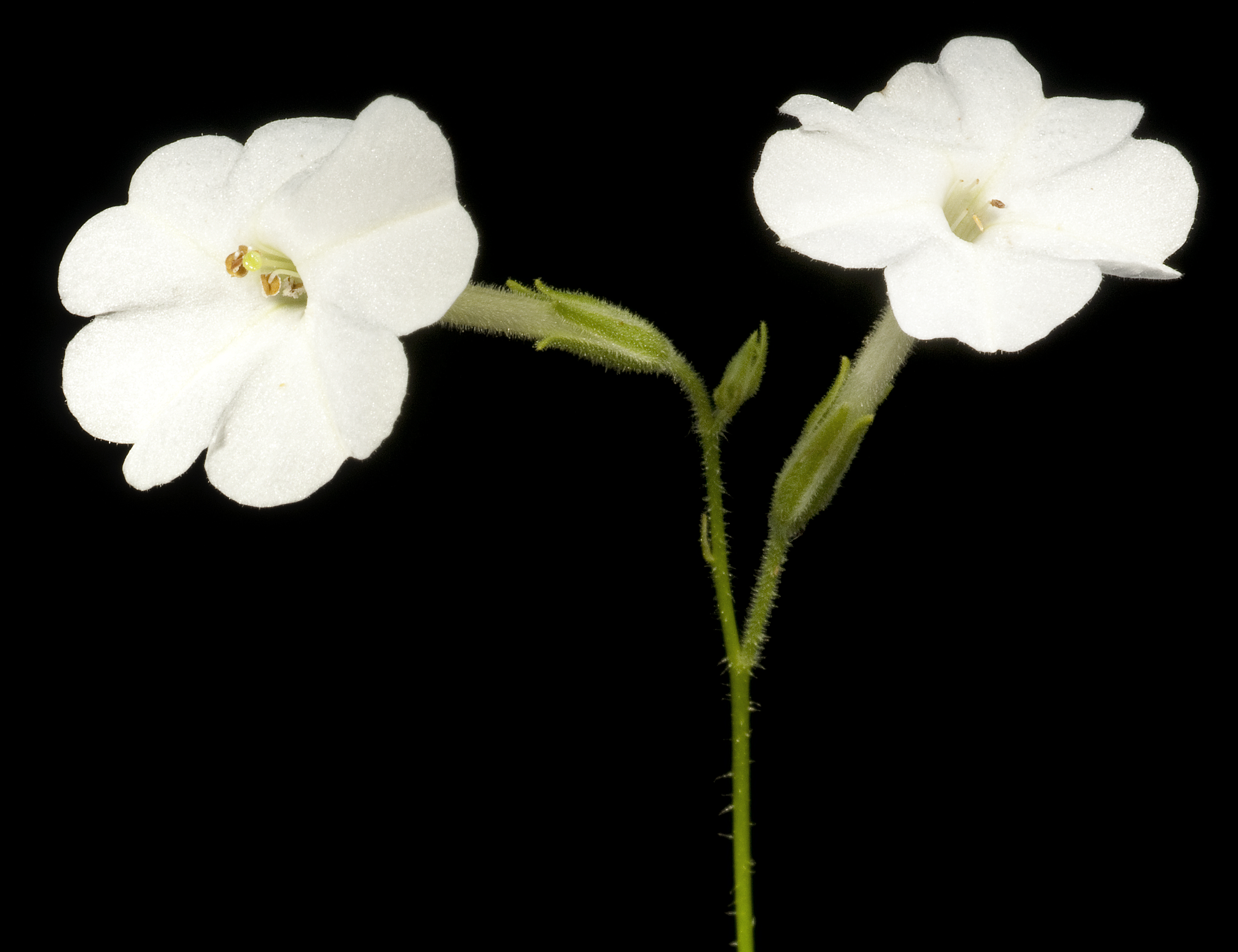

Scientific classification
- Kingdom: Plantae
- Clade: Tracheophytes
- Clade: Angiosperms
- Clade: Eudicots
- Clade: Asterids
- Order: Solanales
- Family: Solanaceae
- Genus: Nicotiana
- Species: N. rosulata

Binomial name
- Nicotiana rosulata (S.Moore) Domin

= Nicotiana rosulata =

Species of plant

Nicotiana rosulata is a plant in the family Solanaceae, native to Western Australia, South Australia and the Northern Territory.

N. rosulata was first described in 1899 as Nicotiana suaveolens var. rosulata by Spencer Le Marchant Moore, but the taxon was elevated to species status by Karel Domin in 1929.
