= Maiawali =

Indigenous people of Australia

The Maiawali, other wise known as the Mayuli, are an Indigenous Australian people of the state of Queensland.

== Language ==
Maiawali
- Myalli, Myallee
- Native to: Australia
- Region: Queensland
- Ethnicity: Maiawali
- Era: attested 1906
- Language family: Pama–Nyungan: Karnic; Palku; Pitta Pitta; Maiawali

Language codes
- ISO 639-3: yxa
- Glottolog: None
- AIATSIS: L40

The Maiawali spoke a dialect of Pitta Pitta. A number of brief records of their language were made by early European settlers in their area.

== Country ==
Norman Tindale estimated their tribal lands as covering 12,200 square miles (32,000 km^{2}), taking in the areas of the Diamantina River, from Davenport Downs and the Diamantina lakes north to Old Cork, and the land from the Mayne River to Mount Vergemont. Their westerly limits were at Spring Vale. To their southeast the territory went as far as Farrars Creek. Connemara and Brighton Downs were part of Maiawali lands.

== Social customs ==
Males were initiated into full manhood by undergoing subincision at the Mika ceremony. Hill described the technique in the following terms:

One of the elders will lie face downwards on the ground, a slight excavation having been made there to receive the stomach, the initiate is placed upon this individual's back, face up, his limbs are placed in position by various assistants, one of whom sits astride the initiate's body and holds the initiate's penis, while the actual operator makes a superficial incision through the skin from the external meatus down to near the scrotal pouch in line with the Median Raphe; a deeper incision is next made with a stone knife which opens up the canal as it is pushed onwards. Haemorrhage is prevented by the initiate squatting over some smoking embers and heated charcoal placed in a small excavation in the ground beneath him, the wound being subsequently smeared with greased and powdered charcoal. For the next two or three weeks they will always try and arrange matters so as to micturate close to or over some smoking ashes; after the operation the initiate is looked on as an adult man' (Note: Hill appears to have copied this from Roth 1897.)

== History of contact ==
Mary Durack, writing of the pastoral empires staked out by her grandfather Patrick Durack and John Costello in the 1870s, lists the tribal territories of the Maiawali among the 13,000 square miles (34,000 km^{2}) Costello took over.

Writing in 1901, Sid Hill of Brighton Downs remarked that the Maiawali made excellent stockmen, and estimated that their numbers were still around 500, though rapidly diminishing due, in his view, to the devastating impact of venereal disease, opium smoking, tobacco, and what, regarding the males, Charles Sturt called "the terrible rite" (subincision), and among the females of introcision.

== Native title ==
The descendants of the Maiawali and Karuwali underwrote an agreement regarding mining rights in the area south west of Winton covering 49,110 square kilometres (18,960 sq mi).

== Alternative names ==
- Maiali
- Majawali
- Mailly
- Myall, Myallee
- Myoli
- Miorli
- Majuli (error)
- Puruga (lit.penis people, an exonym reflecting their adoption of circumcision)

== Sources ==
- "AIATSIS map of Indigenous Australia". AIATSIS. 28 July 2023.
- Durack, Mary (1973) [First published 1959]. Kings in Grass Castles. Corgie books.
- Dutton, H. S. (22 January 1901). Goa. Miorli. Coo-coowarra. Vol. 3. Sydney: Science of Man. pp. 208–209.
- Dutton, H. S. (1 March 1906). Aboriginal place names, with their meanings. Vol. 8. Sydney: Science of Man. pp. 14–16.
- Hill, Sid (21 March 1901). Ceremonies, customs, and foods of the Myoli tribe. Vol. 4. Sydney: Science of Man. pp. 24–25.
- Lamb, E. C. (21 April 1899). Aboriginal words and meanings (Myallee tribe). Vol. 2. Sydney: Science of Man. p. 42.
- Lamb, E. C. (22 March 1904). Goa and Myalli language. Vol. 7. Sydney: Science of Man. p. 27.
- Mackie, C. W. (23 September 1901). Mi-or-li and Kal-Ra-doon tribes. Vol. 4. Sydney: Science of Man. p. 133.
- Roth, W. E. (1897). Ethnological Studies among the North-West-Central Queensland Aborigines (PDF). Brisbane: Edmund Gregory, Government Printer.
- Tindale, Norman Barnett (1974). "Maiawali(QLD)". Aboriginal Tribes of Australia: Their Terrain, Environmental Controls, Distribution, Limits, and Proper Names. Australian National University. ISBN 978-0-708-10741-6.
- "Winton ILUA - Maiawali and Karuwali People Indigenous Land Use Agreement (ILUA)". Agreements, treaties and negotiated settlements project. 13 June 2002.
