= Wakabunga language =

Extinct Australian Aboriginal language

Wakabunga
- Wurgabunga
- (unattested)
- Native to: Australia
- Region: Queensland
- Ethnicity: Wakabunga
- Extinct: by 1960s
- Language family: unclassified

Language codes
- ISO 639-3: wwb
- Glottolog: waka1282
- AIATSIS: G15

Wakabunga (Wurgabunga) is an extinct and probably unattested Australian Aboriginal language of Queensland. The one word list labeled as 'Wakabunga' by some is considered by other sources to be of Kalkatungu. It is commonly classified with Wagaya and Warluwarra.
