= Pituri =

Mixture of leaves and wood ash traditionally chewed by Aboriginal Australians

Pituri, also known as mingkulpa or bush tobacco, is a mixture of leaves and wood ash traditionally chewed as a stimulant (or, after extended use, a depressant) by Aboriginal Australians widely across the continent. Leaves are gathered from any of several species of native tobacco (Nicotiana) or from at least one distinct population of the species Duboisia hopwoodii. Various species of Acacia, Grevillea and Eucalyptus are burned to produce the ash. The terms pituri and mingkulpa may also refer to the plants from which the leaves are gathered or from which the ash is made. Some authors use the term pituri to refer only to the plant Duboisia hopwoodii and its leaves and any chewing mixture containing its leaves.

== History ==
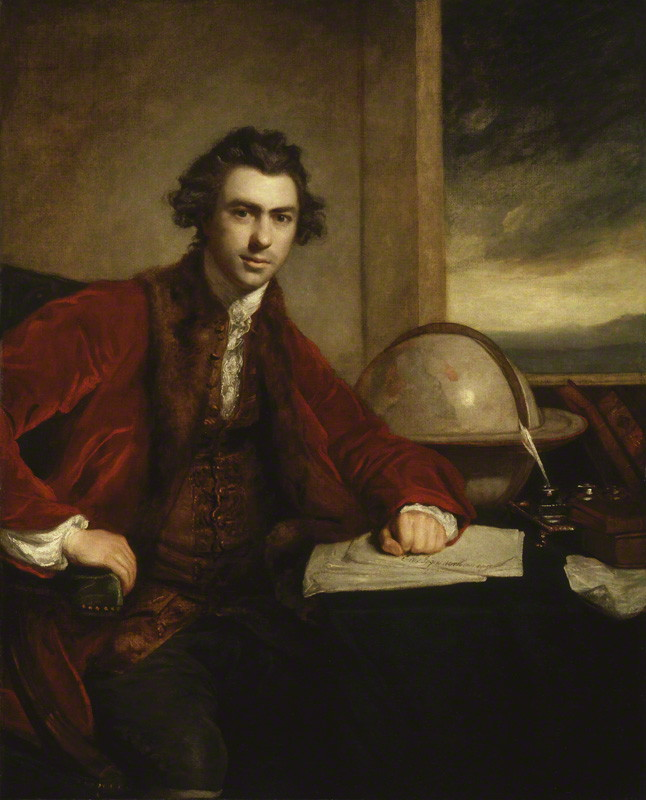
Portrait of Joseph Banks as painted by Sir Joshua Reynolds in 1773

The earliest record of Aboriginal chewing is found in Joseph Banks's 1770 journal:

We observed that some, though but few, held constantly in their mouths the leaves of an herb which they chewed as a European does tobacco or an East Indian Betel. What sort of plant it was, we had not an opportunity of learning, as we never saw anything but the chaws which they took from their mouths to show us..."

— Joseph Banks, The Endeavour Journal, Volume II, 26 August 1770.

Edmund Kennedy, in his 1847 record of a journey beyond the Barcoo River, described a leaf, tasting strong and hot with the aroma and flavour of tobacco, being chewed by the Aboriginal people. Burke and Wills, on their ill-fated 1861 journey through inland Australia, were given food by local Aboriginal people and also "stuff they call bedgery or pedgery" to chew, which Wills found highly intoxicating even in small amounts. A report from Western Australia described the smoke from burning pituri leaves being used as an anaesthetic during surgical operations such as circumcision.

Other nineteenth-century reports said chewing pituri made old men seers, induced valour in warfare and allowed Aboriginal people to walk hundreds of kilometres without food or water; and a 1901 report claimed they "will usually give anything they possess for it". These reports generated significant curiosity within the local scientific community about the identity of the source plant and the identity of pituri's active chemical constituent.

=== Scientific investigations ===
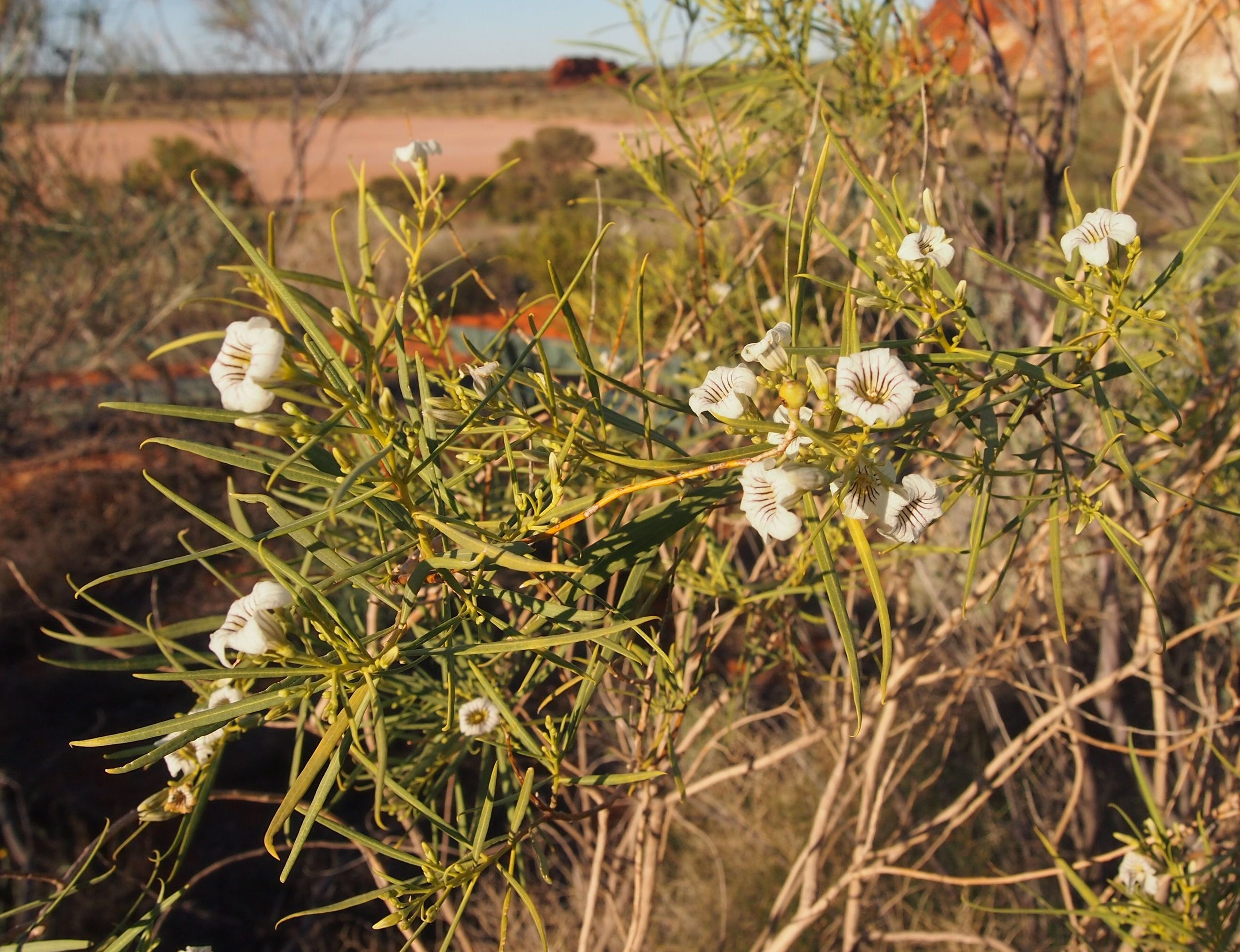
A Duboisia hopwoodii shrub

In 1872, Joseph Bancroft, a Brisbane physician, received pituri leaves from south-west Queensland, and performed the first pharmacological investigation. The doctor reported that extract of pituri is toxic to frogs, rats, cats and dogs, with a very small dose diluted in water and injected under the skin causing death after respiratory arrest in some cases.

Bancroft received more specimens in 1877, collected on an expedition to north-west Queensland by the explorer William Hodgkinson and identified by Ferdinand von Mueller as the broken leaves and twigs of the shrub Duboisia hopwoodii. Hodgkinson was taken aback by Dr Bancroft's assessment of pituri's toxicity, and said it was as benign as tobacco:

...your remarks as to the toxicological properties of petcherie must I confess astonish me. Sixteen years ago, when with Burke and Wills expedition, subsequently with Mr McKinlay and recently in the north west expedition, I used petcherie habitually when procurable in default of tobacco and have often chewed it both in its raw and prepared state.

— William Hodgkinson quoted by Bancroft, 1877

Bancroft took Hodgkinson's samples to Britain and France where English researchers concluded the plant "is more closely allied to tobacco" and a Parisian chemist identified the active constituent as nicotine. This surprised Bancroft who had compared his extract from the first batch of pituri to nicotine and found the pituri extract to be much more toxic than nicotine, a finding confirmed in 1880 in experiments performed by Liversidge in Sydney on some new Duboisia hopwoodii specimens, and supported by an 1882 report that described Aboriginal hunters in central Australia steeping the leaves of Duboisia hopwoodii in waterholes to stupefy prey that drink the water, and other reports describing cattle, sheep and camels which ate it dying. Yet, when Liversidge sent more samples from yet another batch of Duboisia hopwoodii to England for analysis in 1890 the researchers replied, "there was no obvious difference between its action and that of nicotin[e]."

Research into the identity of pituri's active constituent and its toxicity continued to yield contradictory results over the following decades.

=== Identifying the plant ===
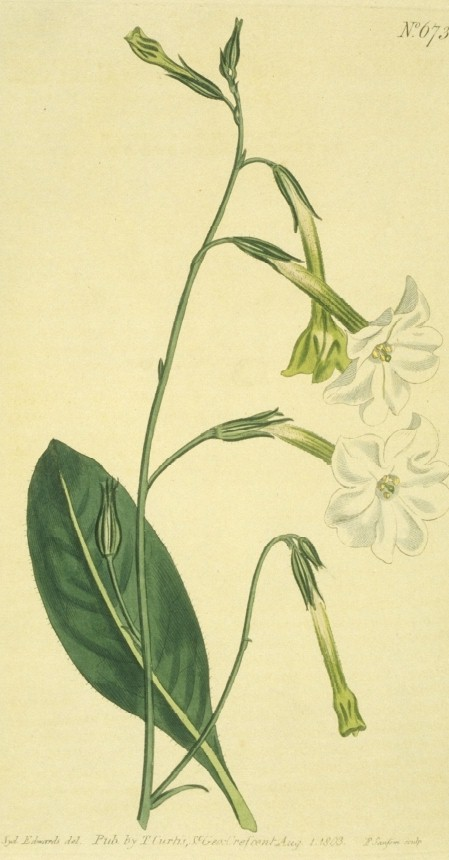
Nicotiana suaveolens, sometimes used in central Australia as the active ingredient in pituri.

Ferdinand von Mueller had identified Bancroft's 1877 batch of pituri as the crushed leaves and twigs of the shrub, Duboisia hopwoodii, and writers subsequently referred to Duboisia hopwoodii as the raw material of pituri. For instance, in his report on the 1891 Elder expedition into northwest South Australia and the Gibson, Great Sandy and Great Victoria deserts of Western Australia, Richard Helms noted, "Whilst these tribes have discovered the stimulating properties of Nicotiana suaveolens [a species of native tobacco], they do not seem to know the more powerful narcotic of 'pituri', Duboisia hopwoodii, which also occurs in many places throughout the same regions."

Then, in 1933 Johnston and Cleland reported that the plant Europeans usually associate with pituri, Duboisia hopwoodii, is not chewed across most of central Australia – native tobacco is; and two years later Hicks and Le Messurier found in a 300-mile radius around the south-west, north-west and north of Alice Springs people "chewed, under the name of 'pituri' the leaves of at least two varieties of Nicotiana ... they wished to indicate that [Duboisia hopwoodii] was 'pituri', but only used when real pituri, i.e. Nicotiana, was unobtainable."

So, it was now clear that pituri is not one substance and the term relates to the chewing of the leaves of various plants including Duboisia hopwoodii and more than one species of native tobacco.

=== Active constituents ===
It has long been known that the active constituent in Australia's various Nicotiana species is nicotine. Twentieth century chemical analysis found that both nicotine and nornicotine, a drug four times as toxic as nicotine, are usually present in Duboisia hopwoodii, and the concentrations of these chemicals can vary widely. In one study, specimens of duboisia hopwoodii from Western Australia and western Queensland were found to contain mainly nicotine while the active constituent of South Australian and central Australian Duboisia hopwoodii was predominantly the more toxic nornicotine. These variations may be due to differences in rainfall, harvest season and soil salinity and acidity.

So Bancroft's and Liversidge's unfortunate experimental animals may have been injected with extracts of Duboisia hopwoodii high in the toxic nornicotine, while the specimens they sent to Europe for assessment (collected from different locations at different times) contained the more benign nicotine and little or no nornicotine. The reports of animal poisonings probably relate to the consumption of Duboisia hopwoodii high in nornicotine.

== Name ==
The word pituri is of Ngaanyatjarra origin, while mingkuḻ-pa is from Yankunytjatjara. In Western Desert language the consonants p and b are interchangeable, as are t and d, and early European writers employed a wide variety of spellings.

These terms are used by Aboriginal Australians to refer not only to the leaf or the mixture of ash and leaf that is chewed but also to the shrubs and trees that are the sources of the ash and leaf.

Some authors use the term pituri to refer only to the plant Duboisia hopwoodii and its leaves and any chewing mixture containing its leaves.

== Preparation and use ==
In central Australia, various species of wild Nicotiana are used. Nicotiana gossei and a subspecies of Nicotiana rosulata called Ingulba are preferred. In a small area west of the Mulligan River in south-western Queensland, a distinct population of Duboisia hopwoodii, low in nornicotine, has been traditionally used and traded widely.

Dried leaves are broken up, ground, mixed with ash and chewed to form a "quid" (a roll about the size and shape of a cigarette). The ash is thought to raise the pH of the mixture and facilitate the release of nicotine from the plant and its absorption through the mouth wall. Various types of wood are burned for ash including species of Acacia, Grevillea and Eucalyptus. Acacia salicina, whose ash is very high in the alkali calcium sulphate, is one of the preferred species.

The quid is chewed from time to time and held behind the lower lip or cheek for long periods, where the thin skin, richly endowed with blood vessels, readily absorbs the nicotine. It may be shared with others, passing from person to person until returned to its owner. It may be carried pressed behind the ear, under a breast or beneath a head- or arm-band – possibly acting as a nicotine patch. A fresh quid may be prepared and held in the mouth while sleeping, so that for some chewers nicotine absorption is constant.

== Pharmacology ==
At first, nicotine acts as a stimulant, boosting the production or availability of chemicals such as acetylcholine, norepinephrine, dopamine, beta-endorphin and serotonin in the brain and other parts of the body. After sustained use, though, the body's ability to maintain heightened levels of these chemicals is temporarily exhausted and nicotine begins to act as a depressant and in high doses may induce stupor or trance.

== Trade ==
In traditional Aboriginal Australia there was an extensive network of trade routes across the continent and pituri was bartered for such goods as boomerangs, spears, shields and ochre.

Dubousia hopwoodii was collected from the Mulligan River region by the Wangka-Yutyurru, Wangkamadla, Wangkangurru, and Yarluyandi peoples. For trade, they mixed the dried and ground leaves and twigs with ash and packed the mixture into unique D-shaped woven bags made from vegetable fibre and human hair twine. Pituri carried for long distances to trade, and was found in a D-shaped dillybag collected in 1905 from Boulia in south-western Queensland.

== See also ==
- Pituriaspis, an extinct fish named after this drug due to the hallucinogenic appearance of its fossils
