= Karanya =

Aboriginal Australian people

The Karanja (Karanya) were an indigenous Australian people of the state of Queensland.

== Country ==
The Karanja, a people of the Channel Country, are estimated by Norman Tindale to have had tribal lands extending over approximately 2,400 square miles (6,200 km^{2}), taking in Bedourie, the Georgina River and King Creek, and reaching south to Cluny and Glengyle. Their western boundaries were around Moorabulla (Mount David).

== History of contact ==
When whites first began to settle the area in 1876, the Karanja were calculated to be around 250 people. Within a seven years, this figure dropped to 180, with settlers claiming that the reduction was caused by consumption and venereal disease.

== Lifestyle ==
The Karanja, other than what they could gather from hunting local game, relied on a bread cake made from nardoo seeds as a staple.

== Alternative names ==
- Karenya
- Kurrana (from karana, meaning 'mkan')
- Mooraboola (toponym)
- Moorloobulloo
- Ngulubulu (language name)
- Ooloopooloo (garbled mishearing of their name)

== Sources ==
- Machattie, J. O.; Little, S. J. (1886). "Junction of King's Creek and the Georgina River." (PDF). In Curr, Edward Micklethwaite (ed.). The Australian race: its origin, languages, customs, place of landing in Australia and the routes by which it spread itself over the continent. Vol. 2. Melbourne: J. Ferres. pp. 366–369.
- Tindale, Norman Barnett (1974). "Karanja (QLD)". Aboriginal Tribes of Australia: Their Terrain, Environmental Controls, Distribution, Limits, and Proper Names. Australian National University Press. ISBN 978-0-708-10741-6.
