= Glenormiston Station =

Pastoral lease and cattle station in Queensland, Australia

Coordinates: 22.91497°S 138.80455°E

Location in Queensland

Glenormiston Station, commonly known as Glenormiston, is a pastoral lease that operates as a cattle station in Queensland, Australia.

== Description ==
Glenormiston is located about 113 kilometres (70 mi) west of Boulia and 335 kilometres (208 mi) north of Birdsville in Central West Queensland. Located at the top of the Channel Country the property shares a boundary with Marion Downs Station. The Georgina River flows through the north eastern part of the property as it journeys southward further into the channel country.

The station occupies an area of 6,920 square kilometres (2,672 sq mi) and encompasses a variety of country from the Toko Range to the west to the floodplains to the east.

The land on the property is described as being composed of open and broken downs, with river and creek flats, low limestone ridges, inferior flats and rough hills. An assessing commissioner also noted that "It is light carrying country, but is safe if not overstocked and is excellent country for raising and fattening heavy cattle."

== History ==
The Wongkadjera were one of the tribes local to this area and Aboriginal people once traded pituri north along the Georgina River into Wangka-yutyurru country and south along the Mulligan River to the Lake Eyre system. The creek near the homestead is named Pituri Creek and it flows into Lake Idamea. J.A. Coglan lived in the homestead in the 1890s.

The station was established in 1877 along with several other well known properties in the Channel Country as pastoralists expanded westward from the grasslands at the headwaters of the Diamantina. Other properties established at the same time included Marion Downs Station, Headingly Station, Herbert Downs, Noranside and Roxburgh Downs.

The station was put up for auction in 1881 by its owner, Walter Douglas. At this time the station was 1,100 square miles (2,849 km^{2}) in area and was stocked with a herd of 3000 highly bred Durham cattle and Hereford cattle, some horses, all plant, stores and stock. The lands were described as "open rolling downs with saltbush and cotton bush, thickly grassed with Mitchell grass and other varieties. Interspersed with open patches of gidyah, mulga and other timbers." Later the same year a cook, who had only taken up the position a couple of days earlier, was killed by Aboriginal people in the area. The station was successfully sold at auction to William Kelman.

Flooding occurred at the station in 1885 when somewhere between 12 inches (305 mm) and 17 inches (432 mm) of rain fell over the course of a month. The Georgina River and the Diamatina River both were flooded and the nearby Sandringham station was submerged.

At some point prior to 1890 the station changed hands; the new owner was James Tyson, who owned several other stations including Tupra, Mooroonowa, Juanbung and Bangate in New South Wales and Meteor Downs, Albinia, Mount Russell and Tinnenburra in Queensland.

The property was stocked with 25,000 cattle in 1890. In 1893 the region was struck by a terrible drought and the station would be thought to be lucky to be able to muster 10,000 cattle, with carcasses laying all over the property. Drought struck again in 1897 but to a lesser extent.

Tyson died in 1898, Glenormiston was stocked with about 10,048 cattle and 220 horses at this time. When the station was advertised for sale in 1899 it had an area of 2,600 square miles (6,734 km^{2}) and as adjoining Herbert Downs and Roxborough Downs stations. The station sold later that year to Collins, White and Co. along with Carnarvon and Babiloora Stations in the Warrego district.

Rabbits were first seen at the station in the late 1890s, with at least one permanent colony known to be located near Toco lake on the station, which was the furthest north that the rabbit had ventured in 1899.

A meteorite, known as the Glenormiston meteorite, was found on the station by the manager Mr F. H. Story, in 1925. Story sold the object to the University of Queensland in 1926. The meteorite had a mass of 38.5 kilograms (85 lb), has an irregular sub-triangular shape with convex and concave surfaces.

The area was struck by drought in 1952.

In 1955 the property was completely cut off by floodwaters. A Trans Australia Airlines aeroplane was chartered to do an airdrop of food to the property, which had been without fresh food for a week.

The North Australian Pastoral Company acquired Glenormiston in 1968. The adjoining property, Marion Downs, was acquired at about the same time. Stephen and Narda Bryce moved to the property in 2001 and Stephen was still managing the property and about ten staff in 2012. The property has a carrying capacity of about 7000 head of cattle depending on the season.

Moderate flooding was experienced at Glenormiston in 2010 following heavy rains locally and further north in the Georgina catchment.

== See also ==
- List of ranches and stations
- List of the largest stations in Australia
