= Barry Blake =

Australian linguist

Barry John Blake FAHA (born 1937) is an Australian linguist, specialising in the description of Australian Aboriginal languages. He is a professor emeritus at La Trobe University Melbourne.

== Career ==
Blake was born in the northern Melbourne suburb of Ascot Vale. His father was an accomplished speaker of rhyming slang, and Blake was raised listening to talks in which a priest would be called 'cream and yeast', nuns 'currant buns' and being drunk ('pissed') 'Brahms and Liszt'. After graduating from Melbourne University with an honours degree in Latin and English, he worked as a secondary schoolteacher before joining the Australian Department of Defence where he worked as a language instructor. In 1966, he became a research fellow at the Australian Institute of Aboriginal Studies at Monash University and began to undertake field research and analysis of three moribund three indigenous languages, Kalkatungu, once spoken around Mount Isa in central Queensland and which was the basis for his M.A.thesis (1968), Pitta Pitta and Yalarnnga. He obtained his PhD at Monash in 1975.

He was elected fellow of the Australian Academy of the Humanities in 1987, and in the following year was appointed to the Foundation Chair in linguistics at La Trobe University. He has recently reconstructed aspects of the extinct dialects of the Kulin languages from fragmentary evidence retrieved from various ethnographic reports made in the 19th century.

== Theoretical work ==
Blake's theoretical work has made a decisive contribution to the long-standing debate over whether the observed distinction between the Pama-Nyungan languages and non-Pama-Nyungan languages of Australia was genetic or typological. Robert M. W. Dixon had reconstructed the elements of the proto-Australian pronoun system, and Blake did similar work for the non-Pama-Nyungan languages, showing that their verb pronominal prefix forms may well have descended from a single proto-language, with a distinct set of proto-pronouns, the implication being that there were two distinct proto-languages in the Australian continent.

His linguistic interests have extended beyond Australia, in work on south East Asian languages where he has shown that the phenomenon of ergativity is much more widespread than had previously been thought. He has done pioneering studies in the field of linguistic typology and case-marking systems. For example, he developed the hierarchy of cases.

== Selected works ==
- (1981) with Graham Mallinson, Language Typology:Cross-linguistic Studies in Syntax. North-Holland Publishing 978-0-444-86311-9
- (1987) Australian Aboriginal Grammar, Croom Helm ISBN 978-0-709-93989-4
- (1994) Case. Cambridge University Press (reprint 2001) ISBN 978-0-521-01491-5
- (2010) Secret Language. Oxford University Press ISBN 978-0-199-57928-0
- (2003) The Warrnambool language: a consolidated account of the Aboriginal language of the Warrnambool area of the Western District of Victoria based on nineteenth-century sources (PDF). Research School of Pacific and Asian Studies, Australian National University. 2003. ISBN 0858835436.
- (2007) Playing with Words: Humour in the English Language.Equinox Publishing ISBN 978-1-845-53330-4

== Notes and references ==
=== References ===
- Blake, Barry (1983). "Structure and word order in Kalkatungu: the anatomy of a flat language". Australian Journal of Linguistics. 3 (2): 143–175. doi:10.1080/07268608308599307.
- Blake, Barry (1998). "Passives in Western Malayo-Polynesian:An Asian perspective". In Schmid, Monika S.; Austin, Jennifer R.; Stein, Dieter (eds.). Historical Linguistics 1997: Selected papers from the 13th International Conference on Historical Linguistics, Düsseldorf, 10–17 August 1997. John Benjamins Publishing. pp. 15–24. ISBN 978-9-027-27568-4.
- Blake, Barry (2010). Dialects of Western Kulin, Western Victoria Yartwatjali, Tjapwurrung, Djadjawurrung (PDF). La Trobe University. pp. 1–204.
- Blake, Barry; Smith, Matt (2011). "The origins of Australian slang". La Trobe University.
- Blake, Barry J. (1979). "Pitta Pitta". In Dixon, Robert M. W.; Blake, Barry J. (eds.). Handbook of Australian Languages. Vol. 1. John Benjamins Publishing. pp. 183–242. ISBN 978-9-027-20512-4.
- Comrie, Bernard; Polinsky, Maria (1998). "The great Daghestanian case hoax". In Siewierska, Anna; Song, Jae Jung (eds.). Case, Typology, and Grammar: In Honour of Barry J. Blake. John Benjamins Publishing. pp. 95–114. ISBN 978-9-027-22937-3.
- Siewierska, Anna; Song, Jae Jung (1998). "Preface". In Siewierska, Anna; Song, Jae Jung (eds.). Case, Typology, and Grammar: In Honour of Barry J. Blake. John Benjamins Publishing. pp. ix–xi. ISBN 978-9-027-22937-3.
