= Mulligan River =

River in Queensland, Australia

Location
- State: Queensland
- Region: Channel Country

Physical characteristics
- Source
  - location: Glenormiston Station
  - coordinates: 22°58′59″S 138°14′0″E
  - elevation: 205 m
- Mouth: Eyre Creek
  - coordinates: 24°57′45″S 138°35′10″E
  - elevation: 49 m
- Length: 340 km (210 mi)

Basin features
- River system: Lake Eyre Basin
- Tributaries
  - left: Ripunthala Creek
  - right: Mulligan Creek, Sandy Creek, Kalabarkaloo Creek

The Mulligan River is a tributary of Eyre Creek in the Channel Country region of southwest Queensland. It is in the Lake Eyre Basin. The river rises in Glenormiston Station and flows generally south through Marion Downs Station into Eyre Creek, which ultimately feeds through the Warburton River into Lake Eyre.
