= Yalarnnga language =

Extinct Australian Aboriginal language

Yalarnnga
- Region: Queensland
- Ethnicity: Yalarnnga
- Extinct: 1980
- Language family: Pama–Nyungan: Galgadungic?; Yalarnnga

Language codes
- ISO 639-3: ylr
- Glottolog: yala1262
- AIATSIS: G8
- ELP: Yalarnnga

Yalarnnga (also Jalarnnga, Jalanga, Yelina, Yellunga, Yellanga, Yalarrnnga, Yalanga or Yalluna) is an extinct Australian Aboriginal language of the Pama–Nyungan language family, that may be related to the Kalkatungu language. It was formerly spoken by the Yalarnnga people in areas near the Gulf of Carpentaria the towns of Dajarra and Cloncurry in far northwestern Queensland. The last native speaker died in 1980. It is a suffixing agglutinative language with no attested prefixes.

== Classification ==
Yalarnnga is sometimes grouped with Kalkatungu as the Kalkatungic (Galgadungic) branch of the Pama–Nyungan family. O'Grady et al., however, classify Kalkatungu as the sole member of the "Kalkatungic group" of the Pama-Nyungan family, and Dixon (2002) regards Kalkatungic as an areal group.

== Phonology ==
=== Consonants ===
Consonants
	Peripheral		Laminal		Apical	
	Labial	Velar	Dental	Alveolo- palatal	Alveolar	Retroflex
Plosive	p	k	t̪	t̠ʲ	t	ʈ
Nasal	m	ŋ	n̪	n̠ʲ	n	ɳ
Rhotic					ɾ	
Lateral			l̪	l̠ʲ	l	ɭ
Approximant	w			j		ɻ

=== Vowels ===
Vowels
	Front	Central	Back
Close	i		u
Open		a	

Phoneme/Sound	Allophones	Notes
/i/	[ɪ]	in unstressed or lax positions
/i/	[iˑ]	as a realization of the sequence /ji/
/i/	[i]	elsewhere
/a/	[ə, ɐ]	in unstressed or lax positions
/a/	[æ, ɛ]	when within the position of palatal sounds
/a/	[ɑ]	when stressed and preceded by peripheral consonants
/a/	[ɒ]	when stressed and preceded by /w/
/a/	[ä]	elsewhere
/u/	[ʉ, y]	when within the position of palatal sounds
/u/	[ʊ]	in unstressed or lax positions
/u/	[o]	occasionally in word-final positions
/u/	[u]	elsewhere

== Vocabulary ==
Some words from the Yalarnnga language, as spelt and written by Yalarnnga authors include:

- Kuyungu mungatha: good day
- Karlu / karlo: father
- Mernoo: mother
- Woothane: white man
- Kathirr: grass
- Karni: shoulder
- Katyimpa: two
- Kunyu: water
- Karrkuru: yellowbelly (fish)
- Monero: tame dog
