= Rungarungawa =

Indigenous Australian people

The Rungarungawa were an Aboriginal Australian people of the state of Queensland.

== Country ==
In Norman Tindale's estimation, Rungarungawa lands comprised some 1,200 square miles (3,100 km^{2}) in the area of Roxburgh Downs Station and the Pituri Creek.

== History of contact ==
Around 1880, some years after their lands were taken up for white colonization, the Rungarungawa's number were estimated to be approximately 120.

== Alternative names ==
- Dungadungara
- Ringarungawah (Note: Edward Micklethwaite Curr's transcription of a report by Craigie, considered by Tindale to be a misprint, (Craigie 1886, p. 350))
- Runga-Rungawah
- Rungo Rungo

== Some words ==
- birri-birri (white man)
- numma (mother)
- peealee (wild dog)
- toota (tame dog)
- yapperi (father)

Source: Craigie 1886, p. 356

== Sources ==
- "AIATSIS map of Indigenous Australia". AIATSIS. 14 May 2024.
- Craigie, James (1886). "Roxburgh Downs, Lower Georgina" (PDF). In Curr, Edward Micklethwaite (ed.). The Australian race: its origin, languages, customs, place of landing in Australia and the routes by which it spread itself over the continent. Vol. 2. Melbourne: J. Ferres. pp. 356–357.
- Krzywicki, Ludwik (1934). Primitive society and its vital statistics. Macmillan Publishers.
- Roth, W. E. (1897). Ethnological Studies among the North-West-Central Queensland Aborigines (PDF). Brisbane: Edmund Gregory, Government Printer.
- Tibbett, Kevin (2002). "Archaeological analysis of stone axe exchange networks in the Lake Eyre Basin during the mid- to late Holocene". Australian Archaeology (55): 22–29.
- Tindale, Norman Barnett (1974). "Rungarungawa (QLD)". Aboriginal Tribes of Australia: Their Terrain, Environmental Controls, Distribution, Limits, and Proper Names. Australian National University Press. ISBN 978-0-708-10741-6.
