= Carrandotta, Queensland =

Carrandotta
- Suburb
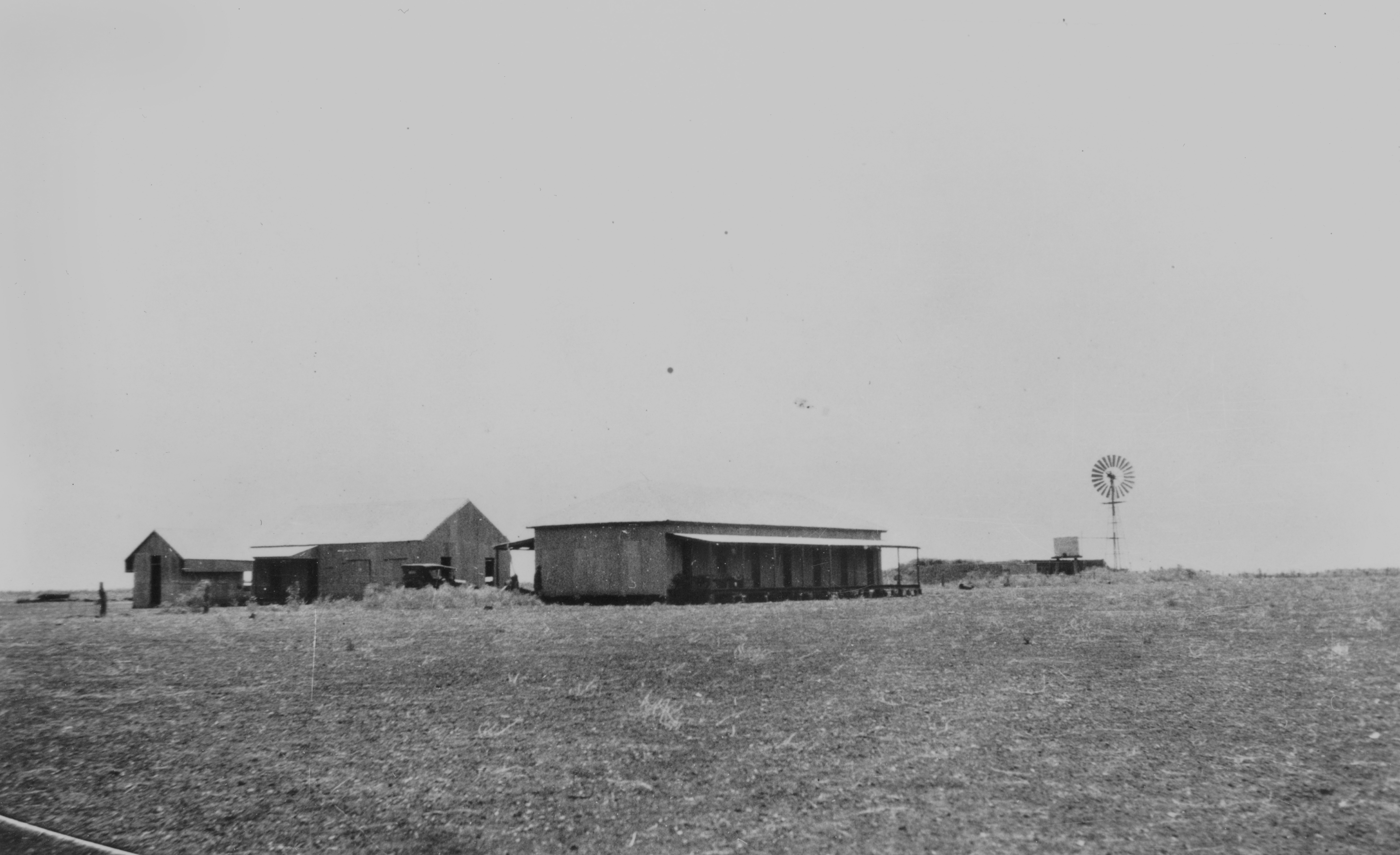
- Shearers' quarters at Carandotta Station, 1934

- Interactive map of Carrandotta
- Coordinates: 22.1430°S 138.3897°E
- Country: Australia
- State: Queensland
- LGA: Shire of Boulia
- Location: 55.1 km (34.2 mi) SE of Urandangi; 201 km (125 mi) SW of Mount Isa; 263 km (163 mi) NE of Boulia; 1,106 km (687 mi) WSW of Townsville; 1,983 km (1,232 mi) NW of Brisbane

Government
  - State electorate: Gregory
  - Federal division: Kennedy

Area
  - Total: 6,920.7 km^{2} (2,672.1 sq mi)

Population
  - Total: 0 (2021 census)
  - Density: 0.00000/km^{2} (0.00000/sq mi)
- Time zone: UTC+10:00 (AEST)
- Postcode: 4825
Suburbs around Carrandotta
| Northern Territory | Piturie | Waverley |
| Northern Territory | Carrandotta | Waverley |
| Northern Territory | Toko | Georgina |

Carrandotta is an outback locality in the Shire of Boulia, Queensland, Australia. It is on the border with the Northern Territory. In the 2021 census, Carrandotta had "no people or a very low population".

== Geography ==
Carrandotta is in the Channel Country. The Georgina River enters the locality from the north (Piturie) and exits to the south-east (Georgina). All watercourses in this area are part of the Lake Eyre drainage basin, and most will dry up before their water reaches Lake Eyre.

The Donohue Highway passes through the south-west of the locality from Tobermoray in the Northern Territory to the west across to Toko in the south (ultimately terminating in Boulia). The Urandangi Border Road passes through the north-west of the locality from Urgandangi in Piturie to the north across to the Northern Territory to the north-west.

The locality contains three cattle pastoral leases: Carandotta Station (from which the locality presumably takes its name) in the east, Wolga Station in the north and Pituri Station to the south.

The predominant land use is grazing on native vegetation.

== History ==
Waluwarra (also known as Warluwarra, Walugara, and Walukara) is an Australian Aboriginal language of Western Queensland. Its traditional language region is the local government area of Shire of Boulia, including Walgra Station and Wolga, from Roxborough Downs north to Carandotta Station and Urandangi on the Georgina River, on Moonah Creek to Rochedale, south-east of Pituri Creek.

== Demographics ==
In the 2016 census, Carrandotta had "no people or a very low population".

In the 2021 census, Carrandotta had "no people or a very low population".

== Education ==
There are no schools in Carrandotta. The nearest government primary school is Urandangi State School in neighbouring Piturie to the north. The nearest government secondary school is Spinifex State College in Mount Isa, which offers boarding facilities. Other boarding schools or distance education would be alternatives.
