= Georgina, Queensland =

Georgina
- Suburb
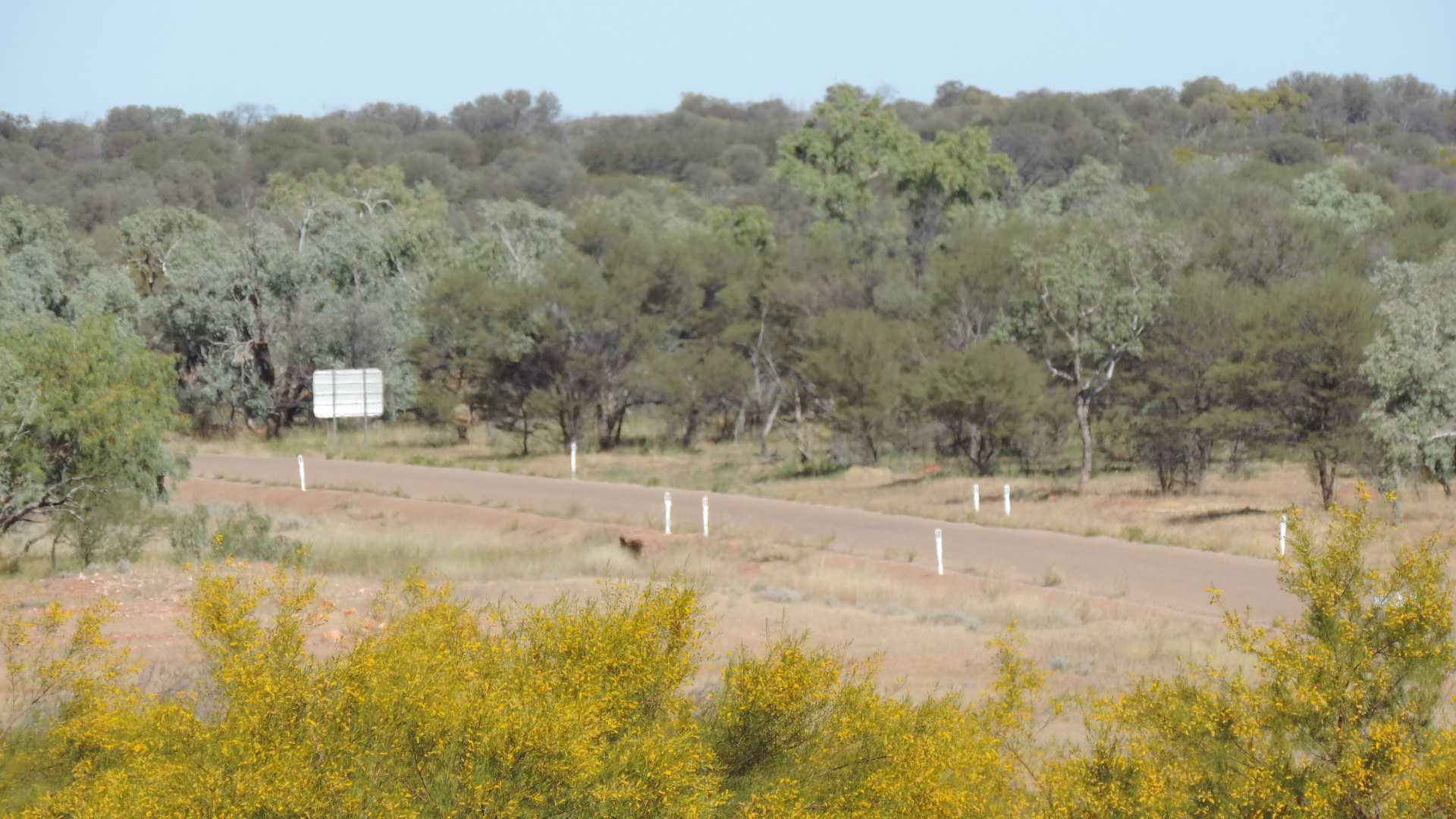
- Boulia Mount Isa Highway, Georgina, 2019

- Interactive map of Georgina
- Coordinates: 22.5379°S 139.2420°E
- Country: Australia
- State: Queensland
- LGA: Shire of Boulia
- Location: 55.4 km (34.4 mi) NNW of Boulia; 93.4 km (58.0 mi) S of Dajarra; 234 km (145 mi) S of Mount Isa; 1,056 km (656 mi) WSW of Townsville; 1,844 km (1,146 mi) NW of Brisbane

Government
  - State electorate: Gregory
  - Federal division: Kennedy

Area
  - Total: 4,553.6 km^{2} (1,758.2 sq mi)

Population
  - Total: 21 (2021 census)
  - Density: 0.00461/km^{2} (0.01194/sq mi)
- Time zone: UTC+10:00 (AEST)
- Postcode: 4825
Suburbs around Georgina
Carrandotta	Waverley	Buckingham
Carrandotta	Georgina	Warenda
Toko	Amaroo	Wills

Georgina is an outback locality in the Shire of Boulia, Queensland, Australia. In the 2021 census, Georgina had a population of 21 people.

== Geography ==
Georgina is in the Channel Country. All watercourses in this area are part of the Lake Eyre drainage basin, and most will dry up before their water reaches Lake Eyre.

The predominant land use is grazing on native vegetation.

The Boulia Mount Isa Highway enters the locality from the north (Buckingham) and exits to the south-east (Wills).

== Demographics ==
In the 2016 census, Georgina had a population of 7 people.

In the 2021 census, Georgina had a population of 21 people.

== Education ==
There are no schools in Georgina. The nearest government primary schools are in Boulia, Dajarra and Urandangi. The nearest government secondary schools are in Mount Isa and Winton and are too far for a daily commute. The Spinifex State College in Mount Isa offers boarding facilities. Other boarding schools or distance education would be options.
