= Moonah Creek Hanging Tree =

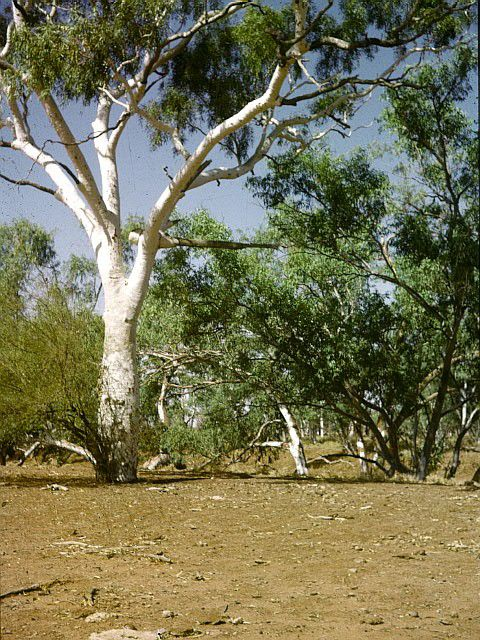
- Moonah Creek Hanging Tree, 1964

- Location within Queensland Location within Australia
- 21.503°S 138.9184°E
- Location: Ardmore Station, Waverley, Shire of Boulia, Queensland, Australia

History
- Design period: 1870s - 1890s (late 19th century)

Queensland Heritage Register
- Official name: Moonah Creek 'Hanging Tree', Killing Tree; Butchering Tree
- Type: state heritage (landscape)
- Designated: 8 September 2005
- Reference no.: 600040
- Significant period: 1890s- (social ) 1890s-1900s (historical)
- Significant components: tree

Moonah Creek Hanging Tree is a heritage-listed tree at Ardmore Station, Waverley, Shire of Boulia, Queensland, Australia. It is also known as Killing Tree and Butchering Tree. It was added to the Queensland Heritage Register on 8 September 2005.

== History ==
This Ghost Gum (Corymbia papuana) near the bank of Moonah Creek and the road connecting Urandangi to the Diamantina Developmental Road is located on Oban Holding in the parish of Moonah. According to oral history from Queensland's northwest Aboriginal communities, near the turn of the 19th century local police used the tree as a gallows from which they hanged 15 Aborigines as a reprisal for cattle spearing. The people indigenous to this area were the Waluwara.

Oban Holding is situated on the Barkly Tableland, an area that has been used successfully for pastoral purposes since the 1870s. As in other parts of Queensland there was tension between pastoralists and the indigenous people, who were in competition for land and resources. Relations between the two groups were often strained, especially during the 1880s.

According to local oral history two policemen stationed at Urandangi, aided by Aboriginal trackers, rounded up a mob of Aborigines reputedly involved in cattle spearing. Using a gum tree they built a timber gallows and hanged these Aboriginal people as an example.

From 1898 to 1902 there were two police constables and a native tracker stationed at Urandangi, the nearest police station at the time when this event is said to have occurred. Under the Aborigines Protection and the Restriction of the Sale of Opium Act of 1897 police in remote and northern areas were also Protectors of Aborigines.

Representatives of the Waluwarra Aboriginal Corporation have extensive oral history relating the incident. However, no documentary evidence has been identified that gives the names of the people hanged, or whether there were more than 15 Aborigines involved in the cattle spearing.

It is not clear whether the Native Police were involved but there is no documentary evidence in the 60 years (1848–1913) during which the Native Police operated in Queensland that they ever hanged anyone. Many incidents have been recorded of native police shooting Aboriginal people, but not hanging them.

It is also possible that the Moonah Creek tree was used for the butchering of cattle. Killing or butchering trees are found on many properties. Usually a timber horizontal beam was tied into a fork in a tree or scarfed in, using an axe to mortice it in. Sometimes the tree would then grow around it, as occurred with the Moonah Creek tree. A timber vertical post sometimes supported the far end of the horizontal beam, to give the structure greater strength and stability.

In 1984 the tree was entered in the National Trust of Queensland's Register of Significant Trees for its reputed association with the hanging of Aboriginal people. The nominator wrote that he had first seen the Hanging Tree many years prior and described it as a beautiful Ghost Gum that over the years had grown around the timber beam, which could be seen clearly in 1964.

== Description ==
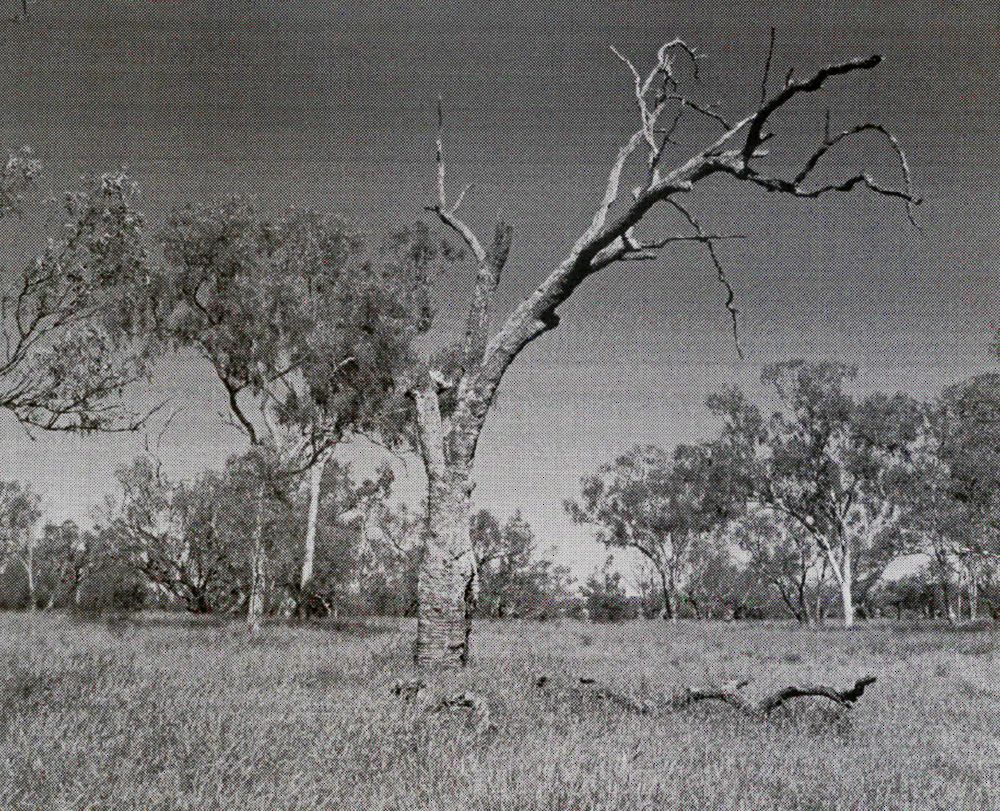
Moonah Creek Hanging Tree, 2003

Commonly known as a Ghost Gum (Corymbia papuana) due to its whitish bark, the tree known as the Hanging Tree is located about 10 metres (33 ft) from the bank of Moonah Creek, close to the Urandangi-Mount Isa Road, where it stands in a landscape of grasses, Gidgee Gums, Ghost Gums and Coolibahs.

A March 2003 report stated that the tree was dead. It stood approximately eight metres in height, had lost two of its four major limbs and that the limb that held the "gallows beam" had fallen and lay broken on the ground. The beam itself was missing. The tree trunk had bad termite damage and a large crack running through it.

== Heritage listing ==
Moonah Creek Hanging Tree was listed on the Queensland Heritage Register on 8 September 2005 having satisfied the following criteria.

The place is important in demonstrating the evolution or pattern of Queensland's history.

The place has a strong or special association with a particular community or cultural group for social, cultural or spiritual reasons.

According to local oral history, at the turn of the 19th century local police hanged 15 Aboriginal people from this tree near the bank of Moonah Creek on Oban Station, as a reprisal following a cattle spearing incident. Tension between indigenous and non-indigenous peoples was characteristic of the Queensland frontier, often resulting in tragic confrontations as the competition for land and resources escalated. While no documentary evidence of the hangings at Moonah Creek has been found, local Aboriginal people are convinced that the hangings took place and that the tree is a conflict site illustrative of the violent history of frontier relations in Queensland. The place has a strong association with the local Aboriginal community (the Waluwarra nation) and the regional community generally for its historical and social values.
