= Waluwara =

Aboriginal Australian people

The Waluwara were an indigenous Australian people of the state of Queensland.

== Language ==
The ethnonym of the people comes from the name for their language, Warluwarra, which is classified as one of the Ngarna languages.

== Country ==
In Norman Tindale's schema, the Waluwara are assigned tribal lands of 7,100 square miles (18,000 km^{2}). They were on the Georgina River, northwards from Roxborough Downs to Carandotta and Urandangi. Their territory took in Moonah Creek and the area in the vicinity of Rochedale. Their southwestern frontier was around Pituri Creek.

== Social organization ==
The Waluwara were composed of several hordes of which the following are known:

- Didjadidja (Roxborough)
- Kapula (Carandotta)
- Panggara (Moonah Creek)

== Foreign impressions ==
J. G. Edge, reporting on some words in their language, thought the Waluwara 'poor specimens of the dark race', citing as an illustration of their backwardness a lack of knowledge of the sea. He was also under the impression that native lore attributed the rites of subincision in their Miki ceremony of initiation as originating in a lack of water sufficient to provide enough food to sustain their numerous children, so that a ceremony of emasculation was established.

== Alternative names ==
- Walugara
- Walukara
- Elookera
- Wollegarra
- Waloo-kera
- Warluwara
- Wallawarra
- Wolga (toponym)
- Walgra
- Didjadidja
- Kapula
- Panggara/Pangara
- Paringgara ('creek dwellers')
- Yannalinka (? horde name at Carandotta)
- Maula

== Sources ==
- Curr, Edward Micklethwaite (1886). Curr, Edward Micklethwaite (ed.). The Australian race: its origin, languages, customs, place of landing in Australia and the routes by which it spread itself over the continent (PDF). Vol. 2. Melbourne: J. Ferres.
- Edge, J. G. (22 May 1899a). "Information from... Carandotta Station". Science of Man and Journal of the Royal Anthropological Society of Australasia. 2 (4): 68 – via Trove.
- Edge, J. G. (21 July 1899b). "The Mika ceremony". Science of Man and Journal of the Royal Anthropological Society of Australasia. 2 (6): 102–103 – via Trove.
- Roth, W. E. (1897). Ethnological Studies among the North-West-Central Queensland Aborigines (PDF). Brisbane: Edmund Gregory, Government Printer.
- Tindale, Norman (2015) [First published 1974]. "Waluwara (QLD)". Aboriginal Tribes of Australia. South Australian Museum.
