= Piturie, Queensland =

Piturie
- Suburb
- Interactive map of Piturie
- Coordinates: 21.4927°S 138.3288°E
- Country: Australia
- State: Queensland
- LGA: Shire of Boulia
- Location: 215 km (134 mi) SW of Mount Isa; 339 km (211 mi) NW of Boulia; 1,118 km (695 mi) WSW of Townsville; 2,040 km (1,270 mi) NW of Brisbane

Government
  - State electorate: Gregory
  - Federal division: Kennedy

Area
  - Total: 4,609.6 km^{2} (1,779.8 sq mi)

Population
  - Total: 57 (2021 census)
  - Density: 0.01237/km^{2} (0.03203/sq mi)
- Time zone: UTC+10:00 (AEST)
- Postcode: 4825
Suburbs around Piturie
Northern Territory	Barkly	Waverley
Northern Territory	Piturie	Waverley
Northern Territory	Carrandotta	Carrandotta

Piturie is an outback locality in the Shire of Boulia, Queensland, Australia. It is on the Queensland border with the Northern Territory. In the 2021 census, Piturie had a population of 57 people.

The town of Urandangi is within the locality.

== Geography ==
Piturie is in the Channel Country. All watercourses in this area are part of the Lake Eyre drainage basin, and most will dry up before their water reaches Lake Eyre.

The predominant land use is grazing on native vegetation.

== History ==
Waluwarra (also known as Warluwarra, Walugara, and Walukara) is an Australian Aboriginal language of Western Queensland. Its traditional language region is the local government area of Shire of Boulia, including Walgra Station and Wolga, from Roxborough Downs north to Carandotta Station and Urandangi on the Georgina River, on Moonah Creek to Rochedale, south-east of Pituri Creek.

== Demographics ==
In the 2016 census, Piturie had a population of 59 people.

In the 2021 census, Piturie had a population of 57 people.

== Education ==
Urandangi State School is a government primary (Early Childhood-6) school for boys and girls on the Urandangi North Road (21.5962°S 138.3359°E). The school had an enrolment of 8 students in 2015. In 2018, the school had an enrolment of 8 students with 2 teachers and 2 non-teaching staff (1 full-time equivalent). As at December 2023, the school is officially open but not operating.

There are no secondary schools in Urandangi. The nearest government secondary school is the Spinifex State College in Mount Isa, but it is too far for a daily commute. However, the Spinifex State College has boarding facilities. Other boarding schools or distance education would be options.
