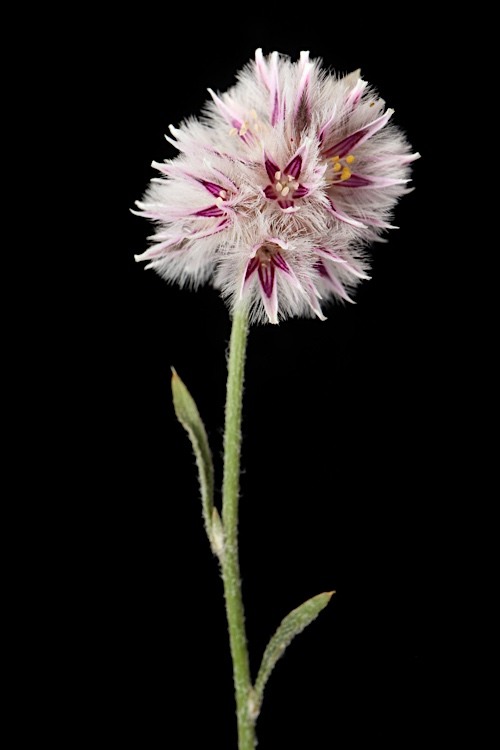

Scientific classification
- Kingdom: Plantae
- Clade: Tracheophytes
- Clade: Angiosperms
- Clade: Eudicots
- Order: Caryophyllales
- Family: Amaranthaceae
- Genus: Ptilotus
- Species: P. leucocoma

Binomial name
- Ptilotus leucocoma Moq. F.Muell.

Synonyms
- Ptilotus calostachyus var. kennediae Ewart & Jean White nom. inval., nom. nud.; Ptilotus humifusus Benl; Ptilotus kennediae Ewart & Jean White nom. inval., nom. nud.; Ptilotus leucocomus A.D.Chapm. orth. var.; Ptilotus leucoma Dunlop orth. var.; Trichinium leucocoma Moq.

= Ptilotus leucocoma =

Species of plant

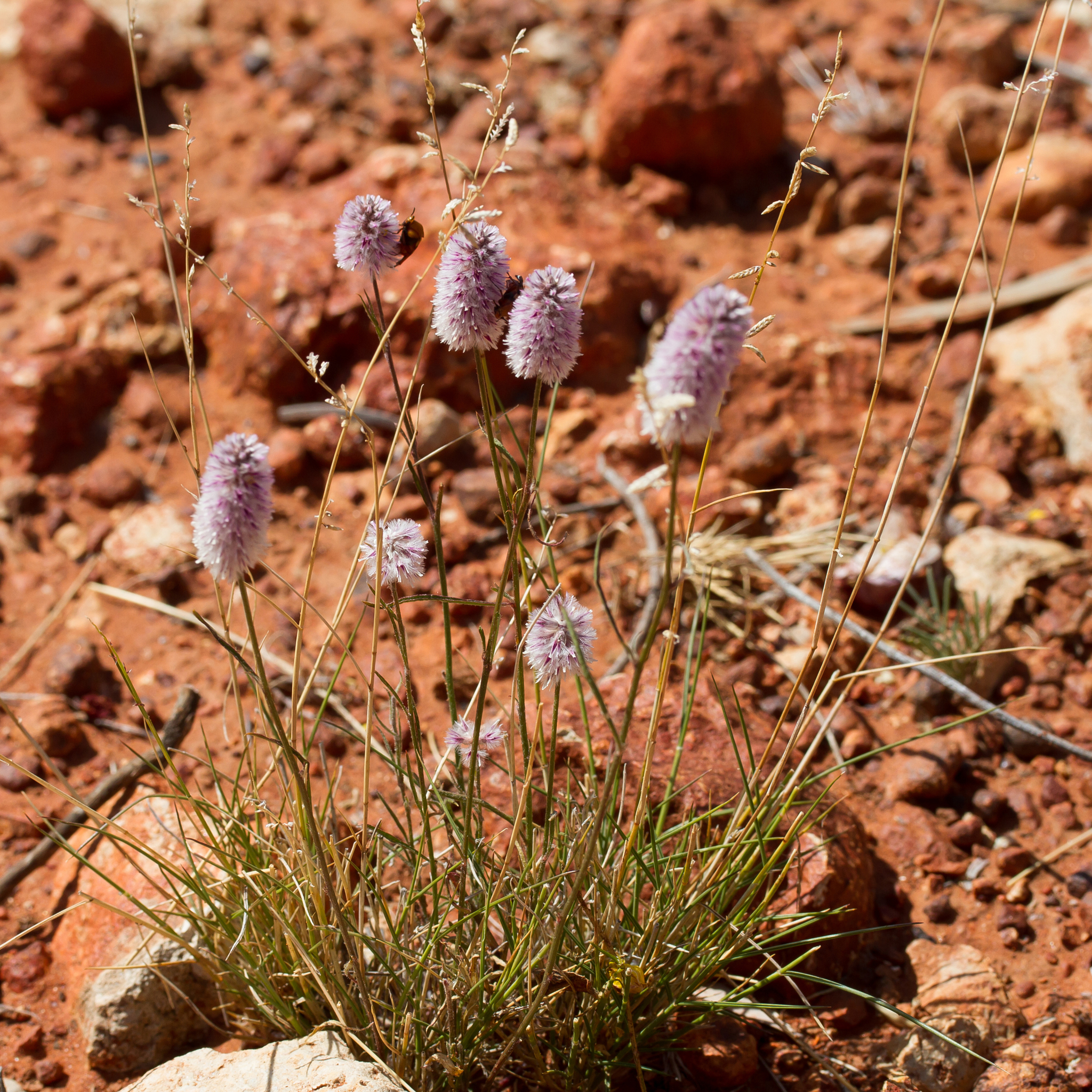
Habit near Cunnamulla

Ptilotus leucocoma, commonly known as small purple foxtail is a species of flowering plant in the family Amaranthaceae and is endemic to inland eastern Australia. It is a spreading perennial herb with linear stem leaves and cylindrical spikes of deep red to purple flowers.

== Description ==
Ptilotus leucocoma is a spreading perennial herb that typically grows to a height of about 30 cm (12 in). Its stems leaves are linear, 10–30 mm (0.39–1.18 in) long. The flowers purple and arranged in cylindrical spikes 20–25 mm (0.79–0.98 in) long and about 10 mm (0.39 in) wide, each flower with perianth segments 5–6 mm (0.20–0.24 in) long, the outer surface covered with soft hairs and the inner surface with woolly hairs at the base but glabrous above. There are 5 stamens and the ovary is stalked and glabrous.

== Taxonomy ==
This species was first formally described in 1849 by Alfred Moquin-Tandon who gave it the name Trichinium leucocoma in de Candolle's Prodromus Systematis Naturalis Regni Vegetabilis. in 1882, Ferdinand von Mueller transferred the species to Ptilotus as P. leucocoma in his Systematic Census of Australian Plants.

== Distribution and habitat ==
Small purple foxtail is widespread from near Wilcannia in western New South Wales to Windorah in Queensland with outlying populations near Cloncurry and 60 km (37 mi) west of Urandangie. It grows on sandy loam with mulga or on stony hills with Eremophila or Senna species.
