= Sturt, Queensland =

Sturt
- Suburb
- Interactive map of Sturt
- Coordinates: 23.5011°S 138.4567°E
- Country: Australia
- State: Queensland
- LGAs: Shire of Boulia; Shire of Diamantina

Government
  - State electorate: Gregory
  - Federal divisions: Kennedy; Maranoa

Area
  - Total: 5,319.2 km^{2} (2,053.8 sq mi)

Population
  - Total: 0 (2021 census)
  - Density: 0.00000/km^{2} (0.00000/sq mi)
- Time zone: UTC+10:00 (AEST)
- Postcode: 4829
Suburbs around Sturt
Northern Territory	Toko	Toko
Northern Territory	Sturt	Amaroo
Northern Territory	Bedourie	Bedourie

Sturt is an outback locality split between the Shire of Boulia and in the Shire of Diamantina, both in Queensland, Australia. It is on the border with the Northern Territory. In the 2021 census, Sturt had "no people or a very low population".

== Geography ==
Sturt is in the Channel Country. All watercourses in this area are part of the Lake Eyre drainage basin, and most will dry up before their water reaches Lake Eyre.

There are no formal roads through the locality.

The predominant land use is grazing on native vegetation.

== Demographics ==
In the 2016 census, Sturt had "no people or a very low population".

In the 2021 census, Sturt had "no people or a very low population".

== Education ==
There are no schools in Sturt, nor nearby. The alternatives are distance education and boarding school.
