= Buckingham, Queensland =

Buckingham
- Suburb
- Interactive map of Buckingham
- Coordinates: 22.2757°S 139.4389°E
- Country: Australia
- State: Queensland
- LGA: Shire of Boulia
- Location: 75.3 km (46.8 mi) N of Boulia; 228 km (142 mi) S of Mount Isa; 438 km (272 mi) W of Winton; 1,795 km (1,115 mi) NW of Brisbane

Government
  - State electorate: Gregory
  - Federal division: Kennedy

Area
  - Total: 1,059.8 km^{2} (409.2 sq mi)

Population
  - Total: 0 (2021 census)
  - Density: 0.0000/km^{2} (0.0000/sq mi)
- Time zone: UTC+10:00 (AEST)
- Postcode: 4825
Suburbs around Buckingham
Waverley	Dajarra	Selwyn
Waverley	Buckingham	Warenda
Georgina	Georgina	Warenda

Buckingham is an outback locality in the Shire of Boulia, Queensland, Australia. In the 2021 census, Buckingham had "no people or a very low population".

== Geography ==
Buckingham is in the Channel Country. Wills Creek and Makbut Creek pass through the north-east of the locality from the north (Dajarra) to the east (Warenda). All watercourses in this area are part of the Lake Eyre drainage basin, and most will dry up before their water reaches Lake Eyre.

The Boulia Mount Isa Highway passes through the locality from the north (Dajarra) to the south (Georgina).

The predominant land use is grazing on native vegetation.

== Demographics ==
In the 2016 census, Buckingham had "no people or a very low population".

In the 2021 census, Buckingham had "no people or a very low population".

== Education ==
There are no schools in Buckingham. The nearest government primary schools are in Dajarra and Boulia. The nearest government secondary schools are located in Mount Isa and Winton, but both are too distant for a daily commute. The Spinifex State College in Mount Isa offers boarding facilities. Other boarding schools or distance education would be alternatives.
