= Scaevola laciniata =

Scientific classification
- Kingdom: Plantae
- Clade: Embryophytes
- Clade: Tracheophytes
- Clade: Spermatophytes
- Clade: Angiosperms
- Clade: Eudicots
- Clade: Asterids
- Order: Asterales
- Family: Goodeniaceae
- Genus: Scaevola
- Species: S. laciniata

Binomial name
- Scaevola laciniata F.M.Bailey
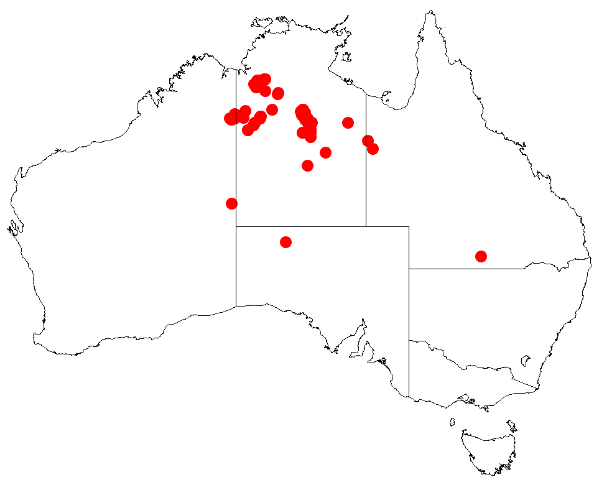
- Occurrence data from AVH

Species of shrub

Scaevola laciniata is a species of flowering plant in the family Goodeniaceae and is endemic to the north of Australia. It is an erect, mostly glabrous shrub or subshrub, with sessile, narrowly elliptic to elliptic or wedge-shaped leaves, spikes of blue, purplish or white flowers, and oval fruit with rough edges.

== Description ==
Scaevola laciniata is an erect, mostly glabrous shrub or subshrub that typically grows to a height of up to 45 cm (18 in). Its leaves are narrowly elliptic to elliptic or wedge-shaped, 10–40 mm (0.39–1.57 in) long and 3–23 mm (0.12–0.91 in) wide, sometimes with narrow pointed teeth on the edges. The flowers are borne in spikes up to 130 mm (5.1 in) long, with leaf-like bracts and lance-shaped to linear bracteoles 4–11 mm (0.16–0.43 in) long. The sepals are about 1 mm (0.039 in) long and joined at the base, the petals 10–16 mm (0.39–0.63 in) long, blue, purplish or white, glabrous outside and bearded inside, the wings up to 0.7 mm (0.028 in) wide. Flowering mainly occurs from April to August, and the fruit is oval, 3–6 mm (0.12–0.24 in) long, rough, sometimes covered with soft hairs, otherwise glabrous.

== Taxonomy ==
Scaevola laciniata was first formally described in 1900 by Frederick Manson Bailey in The Queensland Flora from specimens collected between Camooweal and Urandangie. The specific epithet (laciniate) means 'laciniate'.

== Distribution and habitat ==
This species of scaevola grows in Triodia and Plectrachne communities, and occasionally in woodland, mostly north of 22°S, excluding Arnhem Land, with a few populations just over the Western Australian and Queensland borders.

== Conservation status ==
Scaevola laciniata is listed as 'least concern' under the Northern Territory Territory Parks and Wildlife Conservation Act, the Queensland Government Nature Conservation Act 1992 and as 'not threatened' by the Government of Western Australia Department of Biodiversity, Conservation and Attractions.
