= Carandotta Station =

Pastoral lease in Queensland, Australia

Coordinates: 21.971°S 138.615°E

Location in Queensland

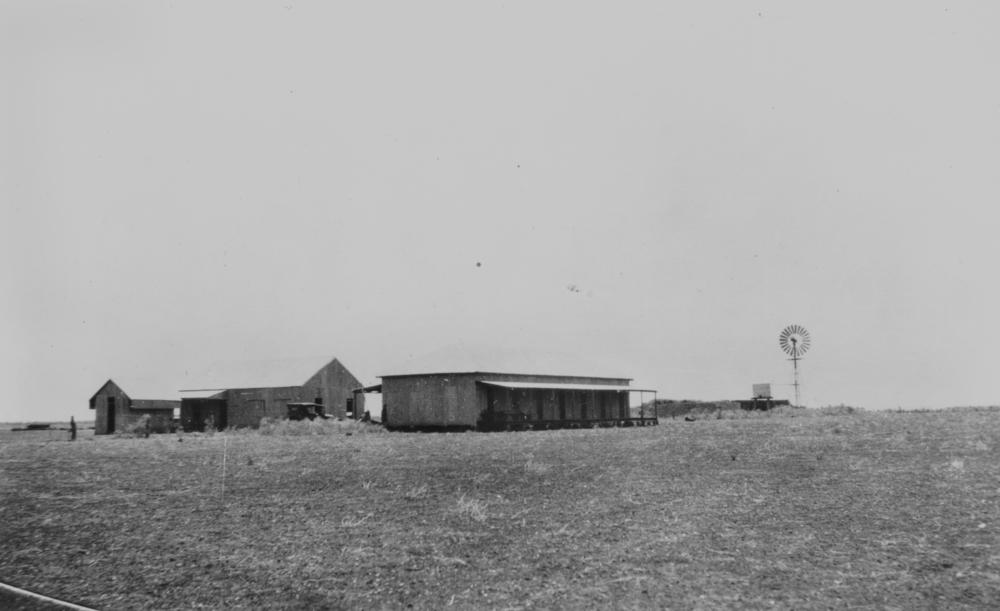
Carandotta Shearers' quarters in 1934

Carandotta Station, most commonly referred to as Carandotta but often spelled as Carrandotta, is a pastoral lease that operates as a cattle station in Queensland, Australia. It is within the localities of Carrandotta and Piturie in the Shire of Boulia.

== Geography ==
It is situated about 98 kilometres (61 mi) west of Dajarra and 441 kilometres (274 mi) north of Birdsville. The property has frontage onto the Georgina River including a permanent water-hole over 30 kilometres (20 mi) long. The land is a mix of floodplain and high pebbly downs that is well covered in Mitchell and Flinders grasses and lightly timbered with bloodwood, gidyea and coolibah trees.

== History ==
Waluwarra (also known as Warluwarra, Walugara, and Walukara) is an Australian Aboriginal language of Western Queensland. Its traditional language region is the local government area of Shire of Boulia, including Walgra Station and Wolga, from Roxborough Downs north to Carandotta Station and Urandangi on the Georgina River, on Moonah Creek to Rochedale, south-east of Pituri Creek.

The property was established by a syndicate of pastoralists headed by Oscar De Satge who took up three million acres along the Georgina River in 1884. The syndicate had believed that a railway would be built through the area from Cloncurry to Normanton. By 1891 the railway had not eventuated but the property was stocked with 100,000 sheep, 800 horses and 20,000 head of cattle. Unfortunately no dams were built and in the drought of 1892 some 90,000 sheep and 15,000 head of cattle perished.

Sidney Kidman acquired Carandotta in 1903 from Pitt, Son and Badgery, at the time the property was estimated as being 10,000 square kilometres (4,000 sq mi) in area for £65,000 on a walk-in walk-out basis. Kidman took his time to settle and paid the property off by 1906. By 1907 Kidman surrendered the lease to the Crown, then released 5,000 square kilometres (2,000 sq mi) of the leasehold.

Sidney Kidman sold Carandotta in 1910 to Messrs Cumming and Capper. At this time it occupied an area of 3,000 square kilometres (1,000 sq mi) and was divided into 20 sheep paddocks, it also had a good wool scouring plant, stone homestead and a carrying capacity estimated at 200,000 sheep.

The property was sold again in 1932 by the trustees of the late Mr. T. A. Stirton to Mr. H. C. Taylor on behalf of the Carandotta Pastoral Company. The property was 2,000 square kilometres (900 sq mi) in size and was stocked with 50,000 sheep, 400 cattle and 200 horses. Carandotta was divided into 51 paddocks and watered by 43 wells.

In 1938 the now 3,000 square kilometres (1,000 sq mi) station was sold once more for £50,000. It was stocked with 10,000 sheep and was sold to the Western Pastoral company.

In the early 1950s the station was plagued by dingoes with 800 being killed from 1952 to 1953.

Later the lease was taken up as part of Headingly Station which occupies an area of 10,032 square kilometres (3,873 sq mi) of Queensland's Gulf country and is able to carry a herd of approximately 40,000 Santa Gertrudis cattle. It is currently owned by the Australian Agricultural Company. Headingly Station consists of three leases that operate as one entity, the leases being Headingly, Wolgra and Carandotta.

== See also ==
- List of ranches and stations
