= Toko, Queensland =

Toko
- Suburb
- Interactive map of Toko
- Coordinates: 22.9132°S 138.5950°E
- Country: Australia
- State: Queensland
- LGA: Shire of Boulia
- Location: 130 km (81 mi) W of Boulia; 493 km (306 mi) WSW of Winton; 671 km (417 mi) WNW of Longreach; 1,358 km (844 mi) W of Rockhampton; 1,849 km (1,149 mi) NW of Brisbane

Government
  - State electorate: Gregory
  - Federal division: Kennedy

Area
  - Total: 6,997.4 km^{2} (2,701.7 sq mi)

Population
  - Total: 0 (2021 census)
  - Density: 0.00000/km^{2} (0.00000/sq mi)
- Time zone: UTC+10:00 (AEST)
- Postcode: 4829
Suburbs around Toko
Carrandotta	Georgina	Georgina
Northern Territory	Toko	Amaroo
Sturt	Sturt	Amaroo

Toko is a rural outback locality in the Shire of Boulia, Queensland, Australia. It is on the border with the Northern Territory. In the 2021 census, Toko had "no people or a very low population".

== Geography ==
Toko is in the Channel Country. All watercourses in this area are part of the Lake Eyre drainage basin, and most will dry up before their water reaches Lake Eyre.

The predominant land use is grazing on native vegetation.

== Demographics ==
In the 2016 census, Toko had a population of 4 people.

In the 2021 census, Toko had "no people or a very low population".

== Education ==
There are no schools in Toko, nor nearby. The alternatives are distance education and boarding school.
