= Amaroo, Queensland =

Outback locality in the shires of Boulia and Diamantina, Queensland, Australia

Amaroo
- Suburb
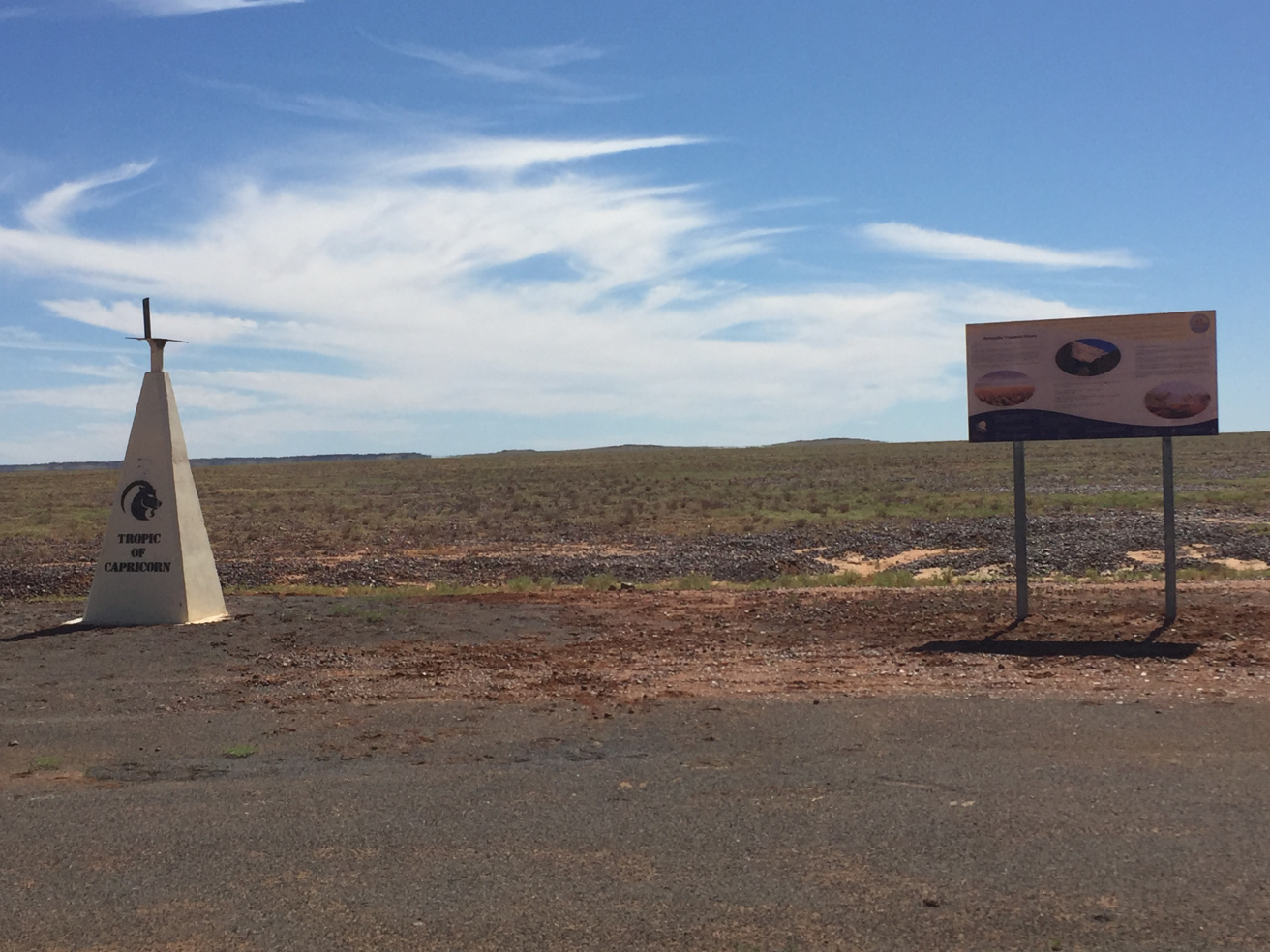
- Tropic of Capricorn marker on the Diamantina Developmental Road, Amaroo, 2016

- Interactive map of Amaroo
- Coordinates: 23.2297°S 139.3808°E
- Country: Australia
- State: Queensland
- LGAs: Shire of Boulia; Shire of Diamantina
- Location: 83.1 km (51.6 mi) W of Boulia; 360 km (220 mi) N of Bedourie; 371 km (231 mi) S of Mount Isa; 446 km (277 mi) W of Winton; 1,805 km (1,122 mi) NW of Brisbane

Government
  - State electorate: Gregory
  - Federal divisions: Kennedy; Maranoa

Area
  - Total: 9,325.5 km^{2} (3,600.6 sq mi)

Population
  - Total: 17 (2021 census)
  - Density: 0.00182/km^{2} (0.00472/sq mi)
- Time zone: UTC+10:00 (AEST)
- Postcode: 4829
Suburbs around Amaroo
Georgina	Georgina	Wills
Toko	Amaroo	Wills
Sturt	Bedourie	Bedourie

Amaroo is an outback locality split between the Shire of Boulia and the Shire of Diamantina, both in Central Western Queensland, Australia. In the 2021 census, Amaroo had a population of 17 people.

== Geography ==
Amaraoo is a large but largely uninhabited locality in the Channel Country. Rivers like the Georgina River, Burke River, Hamilton River and Sylvester Creek flow through the locality, all of them part of the Lake Eyre basin. These rivers only flow intermittently and, even when they flow, the water usually evaporates before it reaches Lake Eyre. The land is relatively flat so there is no clear single course for these rivers but rather they flow along a series of channels in the same direction (that is, a braided river).

The waterholes that result from the flooding of these rivers sustain both native fauna and support cattle grazing which is the principal land use.

The Boulia Bedourie Road passes through the locality from the north-east (Wills) to the south (Bedourie). The Donohue Highway passes through the locality from the west (Toko) to the north-east (Wills)

The Tropic of Capricorn passes from east to west through the locality.

The entire locality is within the Marian Downs cattle station, which being 12,870 square kilometres (4,970 sq mi) also extends into some neighbouring localities. As at 2017, the property is the largest of 14 cattle stations owned by the North Australian Pastoral Company (NAPCO). The homestead is located at 23.3667°S 139.65°E approx 2.7 kilometres (1.7 mi) west of the Boulia Bedourie Road.

== History ==
The locality takes its name from Lake Amaroo, which in turn derives its name from the Kogai word "Amu" meaning water.

NAPCO purchased Marion Downs in 1934.

== Demographics ==
In the 2016 census, Amaroo had a population of 22 people.

In the 2021 census, Amaroo had a population of 17 people.

== Education ==
There are no schools in Amaroo. The nearest government primary school is Boulia State School in Boulia to the north-east., but students from most parts of Amaroo would be too distant to attend this school. Also, there are no nearby secondary schools. The alternatives are distance education and boarding school.
