= Waverley, Queensland =

Waverley
- Suburb
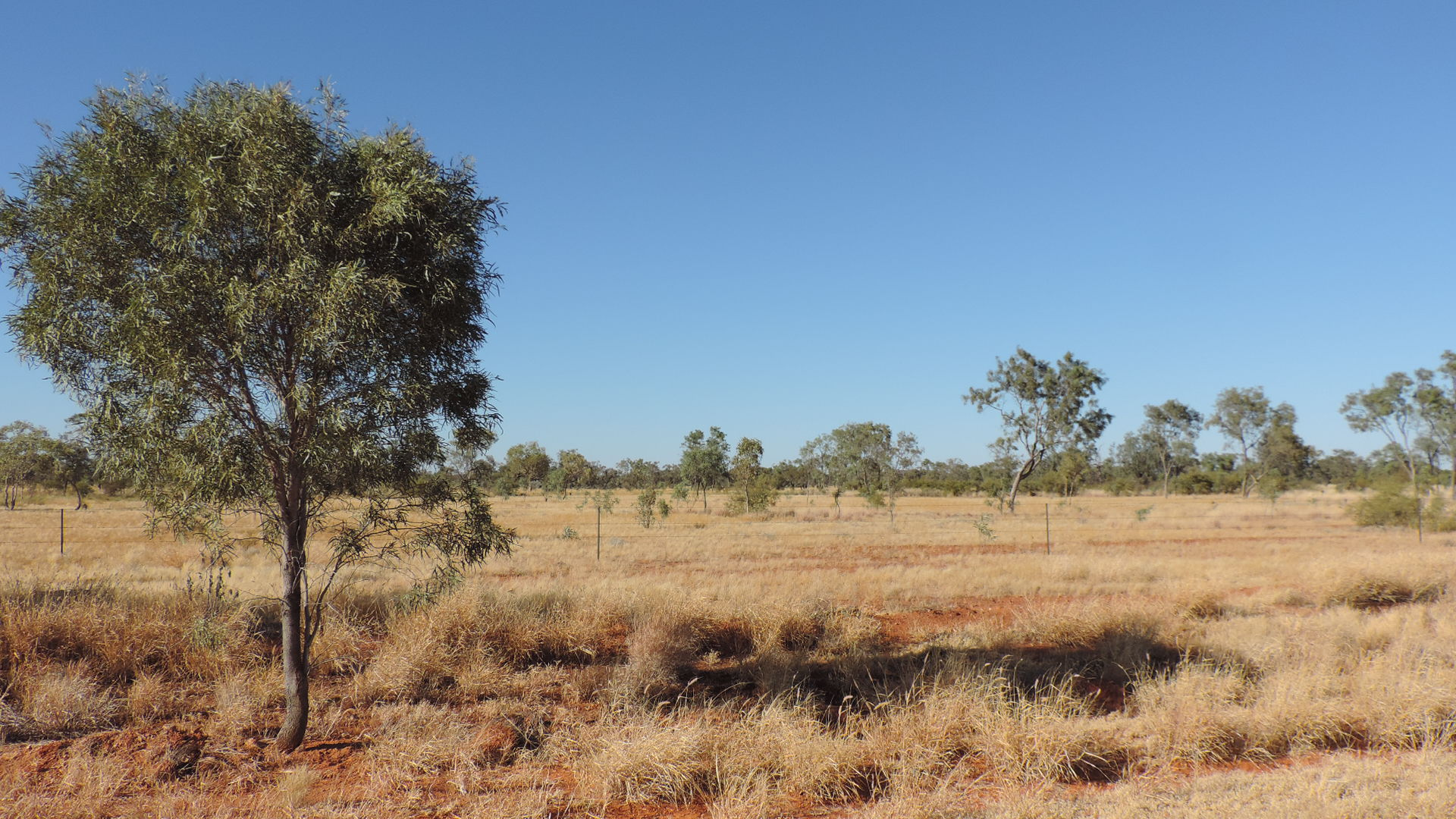
- Landscape beside the Boulia Mount Isa Highway, 2019

- Interactive map of Waverley
- Coordinates: 21.5768°S 139.0092°E
- Country: Australia
- State: Queensland
- LGA: Shire of Boulia
- Location: 38.5 km (23.9 mi) SSW of Mount Isa; 119 km (74 mi) N of Dajarra; 268 km (167 mi) N of Boulia; 940 km (580 mi) W of Townsville; 1,861 km (1,156 mi) NW of Brisbane

Government
  - State electorate: Gregory
  - Federal division: Kennedy

Area
  - Total: 9,244.8 km^{2} (3,569.4 sq mi)

Population
  - Total: 6 (2021 census)
  - Density: 0.00065/km^{2} (0.00168/sq mi)
- Time zone: UTC+10:00 (AEST)
- Postcode: 4825
Suburbs around Waverley
Barkly	Mount Isa (locality)	Duchess
Piturie	Waverley	Dajarra
Carrandotta	Georgina	Buckingham

Waverley is an outback locality in the Shire of Boulia, Queensland, Australia. In the 2021 census, Waverley had a population of 6 people.

== Geography ==
Waverley is in the Channel Country. All watercourses in this area are part of the Lake Eyre drainage basin, and most will dry up before their water reaches Lake Eyre.

The predominant land use is grazing on native vegetation.

The Boulia Mount Isa Highway enters the locality from the north-east (Mount Isa) and exits to the east (Dajarra).

Waverley has the following mountains (from north to south):

- Rifle Creek Hill (20.9537°S 139.5171°E) 542 metres (1,778 ft)
- Mount Guide (21.0375°S 139.5196°E)
- Mount Woodhouse (21.0991°S 139.1348°E)
- Pinnacle Knob (21.8851°S 139.0727°E) 276 metres (906 ft)
- Steamboat Hill (21.9094°S 139.0701°E) 301 metres (988 ft)
- McCabe Knob (22.3101°S 138.9468°E)

== Demographics ==
In the 2016 census, Waverley had a population of 20 people.

In the 2021 census, Waverley had a population of 6 people.

== Heritage listings ==
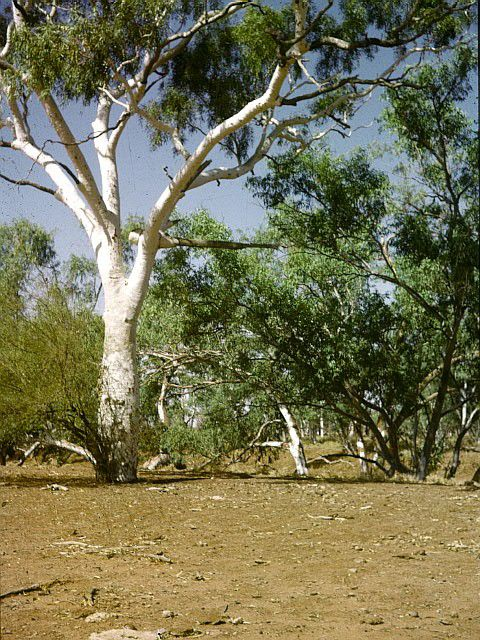
Moonah Creek Hanging Tree, 1964

Waverley has a number of heritage-listed sites, including:

- Ardmore Station: Moonah Creek Hanging Tree

== Education ==
There are no schools in Waverley. The nearest government primary schools are in Mount Isa and Dajarra but might be infeasible for a daily commute. The nearest government secondary school is in Mount Isa. The Spinifex State College in Mount Isa offers boarding facilities. Other boarding schools or distance education would be options.

== Economy ==
There are a number of homesteads in the locality (from north to south):

- Mount Guide (21.0082°S 139.4067°E)
- Sheila Outstation (21.1992°S 138.8466°E)
- Oban (21.2339°S 139.0460°E)
- Suva Downs Outstation (21.6055°S 138.7426°E)
- Ardmore (21.6481°S 139.1844°E)
- Douglas Downs Outstation (21.6576°S 138.9339°E)
- Kallala (21.7585°S 138.8855°E)
- Quewar Outstation (21.9139°S 138.9142°E)
