= Barkly, Queensland =

Barkly
- Suburb

- Interactive map of Barkly
- Coordinates: 20.625°S 138.5036°E
- Country: Australia
- State: Queensland
- LGA: City of Mount Isa
- Location: 90.4 km (56.2 mi) SSE of Camooweal; 145 km (90 mi) W of Mount Isa; 1,049 km (652 mi) W of Townsville; 2,081 km (1,293 mi) NW of Brisbane

Government
  - State electorate: Traeger
  - Federal division: Kennedy

Area
  - Total: 11,806.0 km^{2} (4,558.3 sq mi)

Population
  - Total: 25 (2021 census)
  - Density: 0.00212/km^{2} (0.00548/sq mi)
- Time zone: UTC+10:00 (AEST)
- Postcode: 4825
Suburbs around Barkly
Northern Territory	Camooweal	Gunpowder
Northern Territory	Barkly	Mount Isa (locality)
Northern Territory	Piturie	Waverley

Barkly is an outback locality in the City of Mount Isa, Queensland, Australia. The locality is on the Queensland border with Northern Territory. In the 2021 census, Barkly had a population of 25 people.

== Geography ==
Barkly is a vast area of 11,806 square kilometres (4,558 sq mi). This enables it to have a variety of terrains.

Much of the locality is located within the Barkly Tableland, which in this region has an (20.0000°S 138.5°E) n elevation of around 200 metres (660 ft) above sea level.

Map of the Barkly Tableland IBRA subregion and Barkly region administrative area

Barkly has the following mountain ranges in the north-east of the locality:

- Ogilvie Range (20.3474°S 138.8130°E)
- Pilpah Range (20.3674°S 138.6302°E)
- Saint Smith Range (20.5336°S 138.6601°E)

with Mount Michael (20.8015°S 138.0701°E) in the west near the Northern Territory border.

The locality is within the Lake Eyre drainage basin.

The land use is grazing on native vegetation.

The Barkly Highway passes through the north-east corner of the locality entering from Gunpowder and exiting to Camooweal. The Camooweal Urandangi Road enters the locality from Camooweal and exits to the south to Piturie.

== History ==
The Barkly Tableland was named by explorer William Landsborough on 6 December 1861 during his search for Burke and Wills. It was named after the Governor of Victoria Sir Henry Barkly.

The locality was officially and bounded on 23 February 2001.

== Demographics ==
In the 2016 census Barkly had a population of 28 people.

In the 2021 census, Barkly had a population of 25 people.

== Economy ==
There are a number of homesteads in the locality, including:

- Arcadia (20.8776°S 138.0598°E)
- Barkly Downs (20.4664°S 138.4655°E)
- Bullecourt (20.9377°S 138.3464°E)
- Wooroona (20.4754°S 138.1594°E)

== Transport ==
There are a number of airstrips in the locality, including:

- Barkly Downs airstrip (20.4959°S 138.4748°E)
- Bullecourt airstrip (21.1169°S 138.4975°E)
- Wooroona/Buckley airstrip (20.4791°S 138.1671°E)

== Education ==
There are no schools in Barkly. The nearest government primary schools are Camooweal State School in neighbouring Camooweal to the north and Urandangi State School in neighbouring Piturie to the south. However, due to the size of Barkly, attending these schools would only be feasible for children living in the northern and southern parts of Barkly respectively. Most of the Barkly is outside the range of any primary school and distance education or boarding schools would be the only options. The nearest government secondary school is Spinifex State College in Mount Isa to the east, but it would be out of range for almost all Barkly families and again distance education or boarding schools would be the only options. Spinifex State College has boarding facilities.
