= The Monument, Queensland =

The Monument Queensland
- Coordinates: 21.7676°S 139.9195°E
- Postcode(s): 4825
- Time zone: AEST (UTC+10:00)
- Location: 55.9 km (35 mi) E of Dajarra (town); 172 km (107 mi) SSE of Mount Isa; 174 km (108 mi) N of Boulia; 959 km (596 mi) WSW of Townsville; 1,879 km (1,168 mi) NW of Brisbane
- LGA(s): Shire of Cloncurry
- State electorate(s): Traeger
- Federal division(s): Kennedy

The Monument is a mining town in the locality of Dajarra in the Shire of Cloncurry, Queensland, Australia. It is nicknamed Phosphate Hill.

== History ==
The town was named by the Queensland Place Names Board on 1 October 1975. The name refers to a nearby mountain, also called The Monument (21.7580°S 139.9159°E), which has a rock pillar standing on the top of it.

The Monument State School opened on 15 March 1976 and then closed in December 1978. It reopened on 15 January 1982 and closed in December 1994.

== Economy ==
The town exists for the workers at the IPL Phosphate Mine.
