= Dajarra, Queensland =

Dajarra
- Town
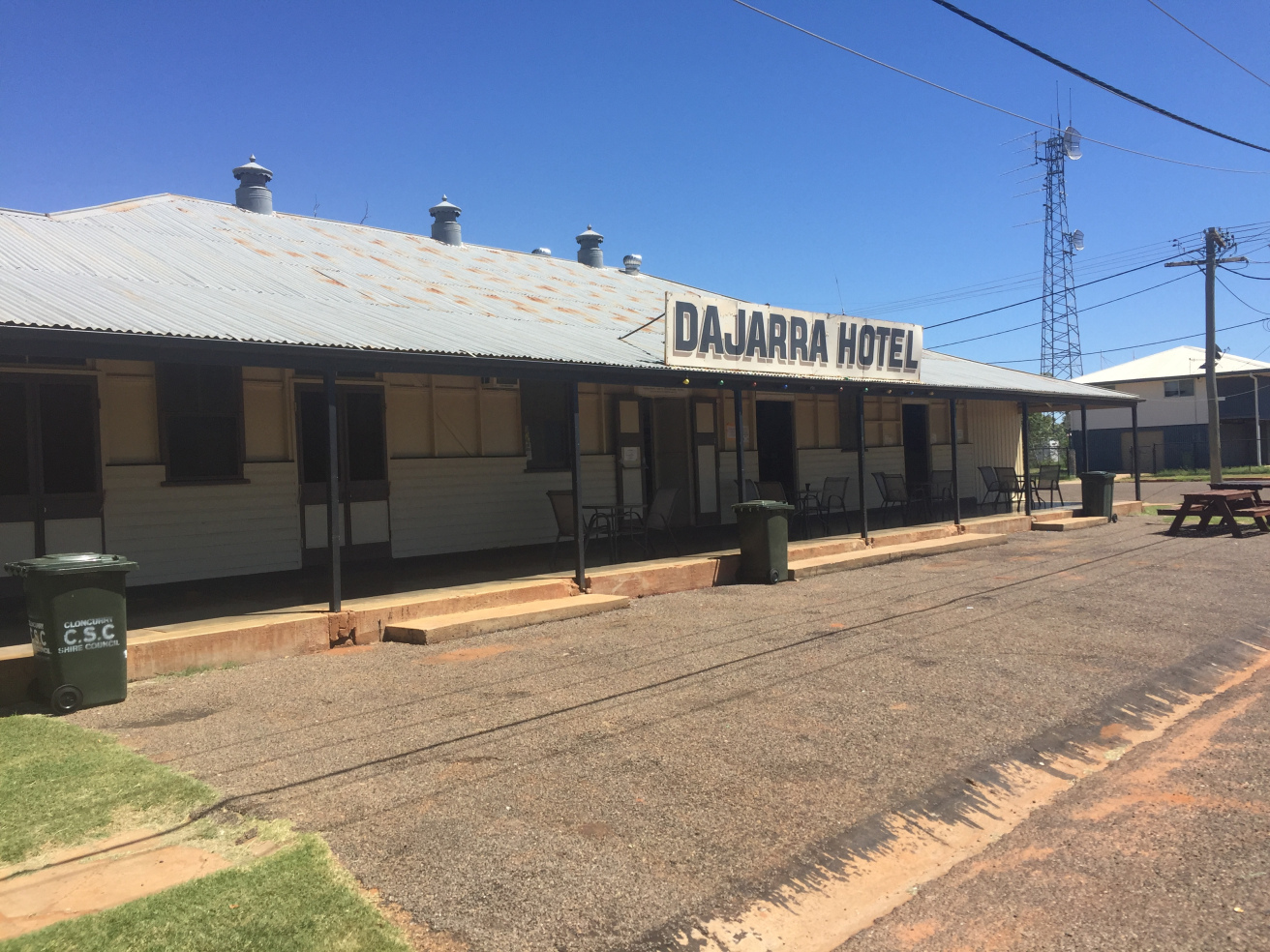
- Dajarra Hotel, Mark Street, 2016

- Interactive map of Dajarra
- Coordinates: 21.6952°S 139.5138°E
- Country: Australia
- State: Queensland
- LGA: Shire of Cloncurry
- Location: 155 km (96 mi) S of Mount Isa; 181 km (112 mi) SW of Cloncurry; 964 km (599 mi) WSW of Townsville; 1,868 km (1,161 mi) NW of Brisbane

Government
  - State electorate: Traeger
  - Federal division: Kennedy

Area
  - Total: 4,965.2 km^{2} (1,917.1 sq mi)

Population
  - Total: 186 (2021 census)
  - Density: 0.03746/km^{2} (0.09702/sq mi)
- Time zone: UTC+10:00 (AEST)
- Postcode: 4825
Localities around Dajarra
Waverley	Duchess	Duchess
Waverley	Dajarra	Selwyn
Buckingham	Buckingham	Selwyn

Dajarra is a rural town and a locality in the Shire of Cloncurry, Queensland, Australia. In the 2021 census, the locality of Dajarra had a population of 186 people.

== Geography ==
Dajarra is in North West Queensland near the border with the Northern Territory. It is about 150 kilometres (93 mi) south of Mount Isa on the Diamantina Developmental Road (also known as the Boulia Mount Isa Highway). The town is close to the intersection of the Diamantina Developmental Road with the Duchess Dajarra Road, which is part of the Cloncurry-Dajarra Road.

== History ==
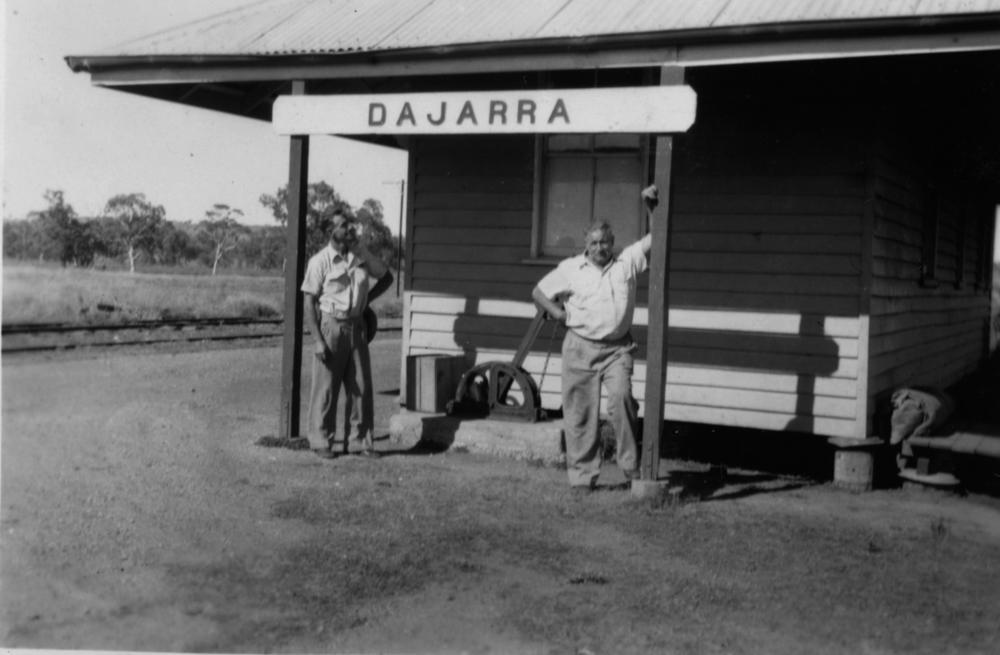
Dajarra railway station, 1940

The town takes its name from the Dajarra railway station assigned by the Queensland Railways Department on 21 June 1916, and is reportedly an Aboriginal word referring to an isolated mountain nearby. It was formerly known as Carbine Creek. The railway station was on the Dajarra railway line which connected Dajarra to Cloncurry via Duchess and reached Dajarra on 16 April 1917. This line was intended as part of the proposed Great Western Railway which would connect Sydney in New South Wales through to Darwin in the Northern Territory; however, the next section of the line from Dajarra towards Camooweal was started but never completed.

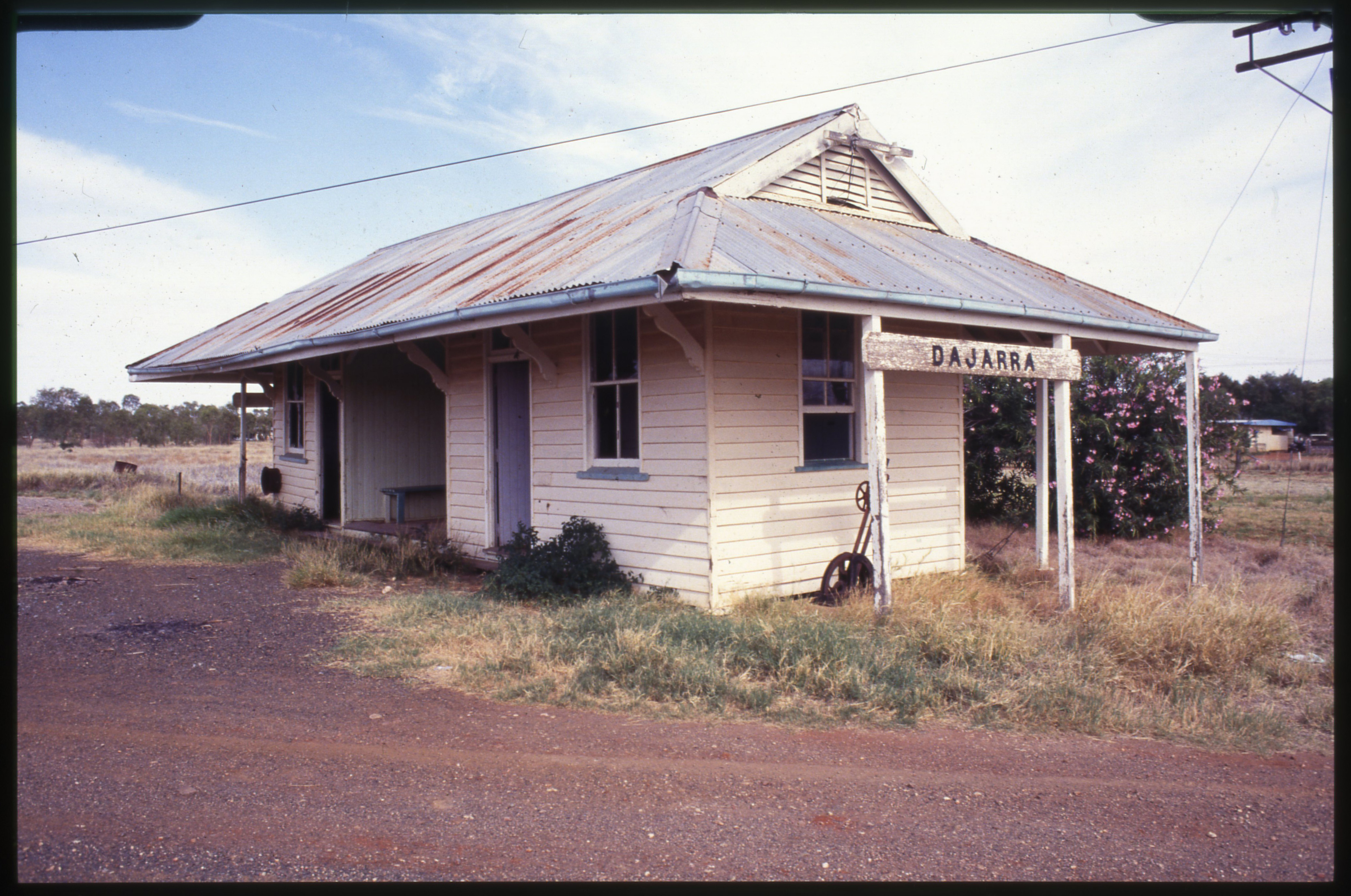
Dajarra Railway Station, 2018

Dajarra once had importance as a railhead for the cattle industry, the railway giving connection to the ports and markets of the east coast of Australia. Dajarra Post Office opened on 7 November 1919 (a receiving office had been open from 1917).

The older people of the area who remember Dajarra's heyday say that the area trucked more cattle than Texas in the United States. Cattle drovers on horseback would bring cattle from as far away as Western Australia to put them on the train at Dajarra.

Dajarrra State School opened in 1920.

St Martin de Porres Catholic Church was built in 1962.

Competing road transport eventually captured the cattle market and Dajarra railway station closed when the line from Duchess closed on 1 January 1994. The last train left Dajarra in 1988.

More recently, some opportunities for local employment have come with the development of the nearby Phosphate Hill phosphate mine and fertilizer production plant. The mining company has assisted the community in developing a better water supply for the town.

The town has a rich Aboriginal heritage and is home to Aboriginal tribes from around the Diamantina River, the Gulf of Carpentaria, and the Northern Territory.

== Demographics ==
In the 2011 census, the locality of Dajarra and the surrounding area had a population of 429 people, of whom 36.5% identified as Indigenous Australians.

In the 2016 census, the locality of Dajarra had a population of 191 people, of whom 60.3% identified as Indigenous.

In the 2021 census, the locality of Dajarra had a population of 186 people, of whom 50.5% identified as Indigenous.

== Education ==
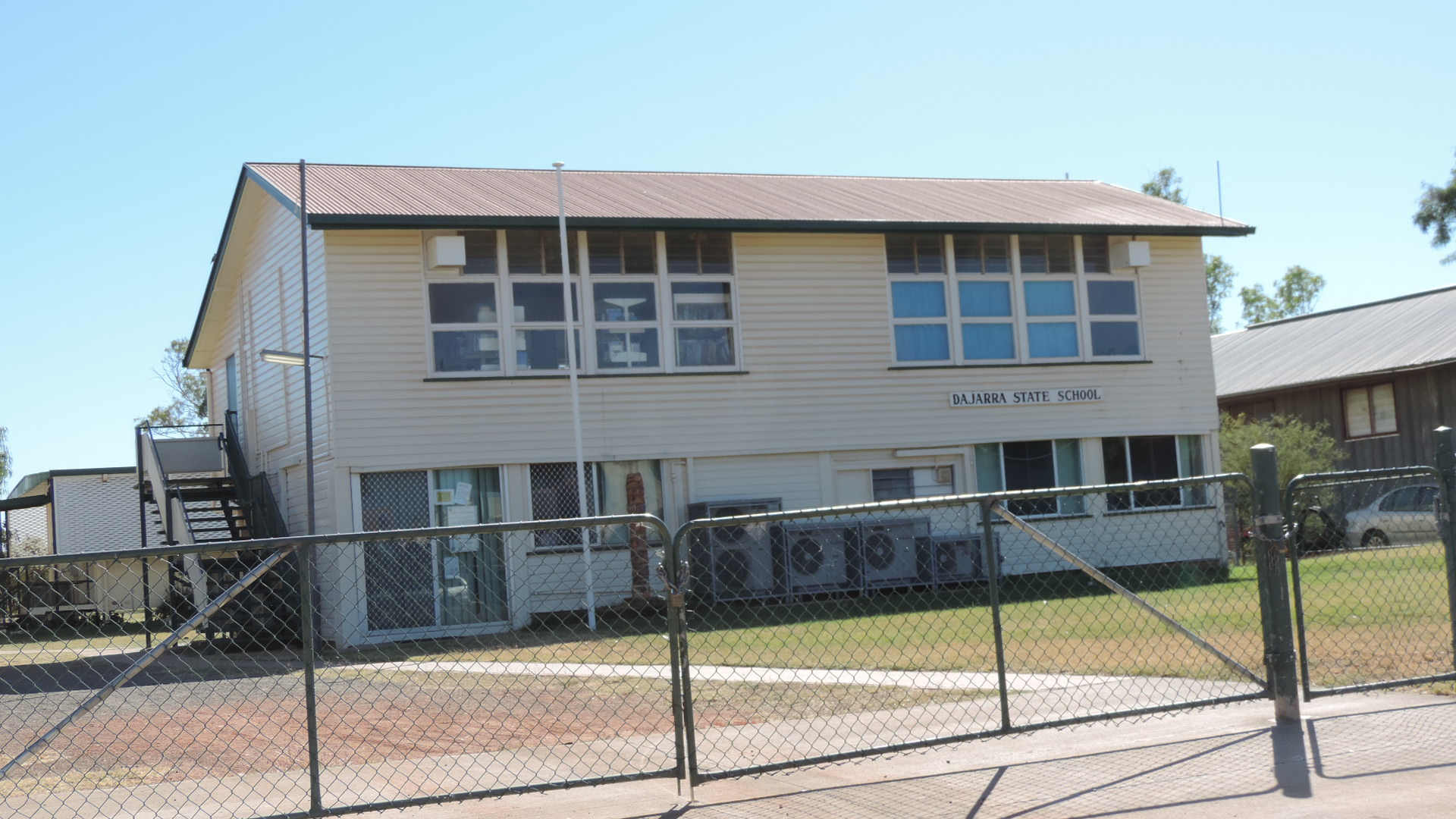
Dajarra State School, 2019

Dajarra State School is a government primary (Early Childhood-6) school for boys and girls at Matheson Street (21.6946°S 139.5122°E). In 2017, the school had an enrolment of 27 students with 4 teachers and 5 non-teaching staff (3 full-time equivalent). In 2018, the school had an enrolment of 22 students with 4 teachers and 5 non-teaching staff (2 full-time equivalent). An Aboriginal language is taught at the school, along with how to make boomerangs, what wood to use and what timber is best for didgeridoos. The children are also taught where to find bush foods and the 'bush lollies' on the gidyea trees after rain, and other traditional foods.

There are no secondary schools in Dajarra. The alternatives are distance education and boarding schools. Spinifex State College has boarding facilities in Healy, Mount Isa.

== Attractions ==
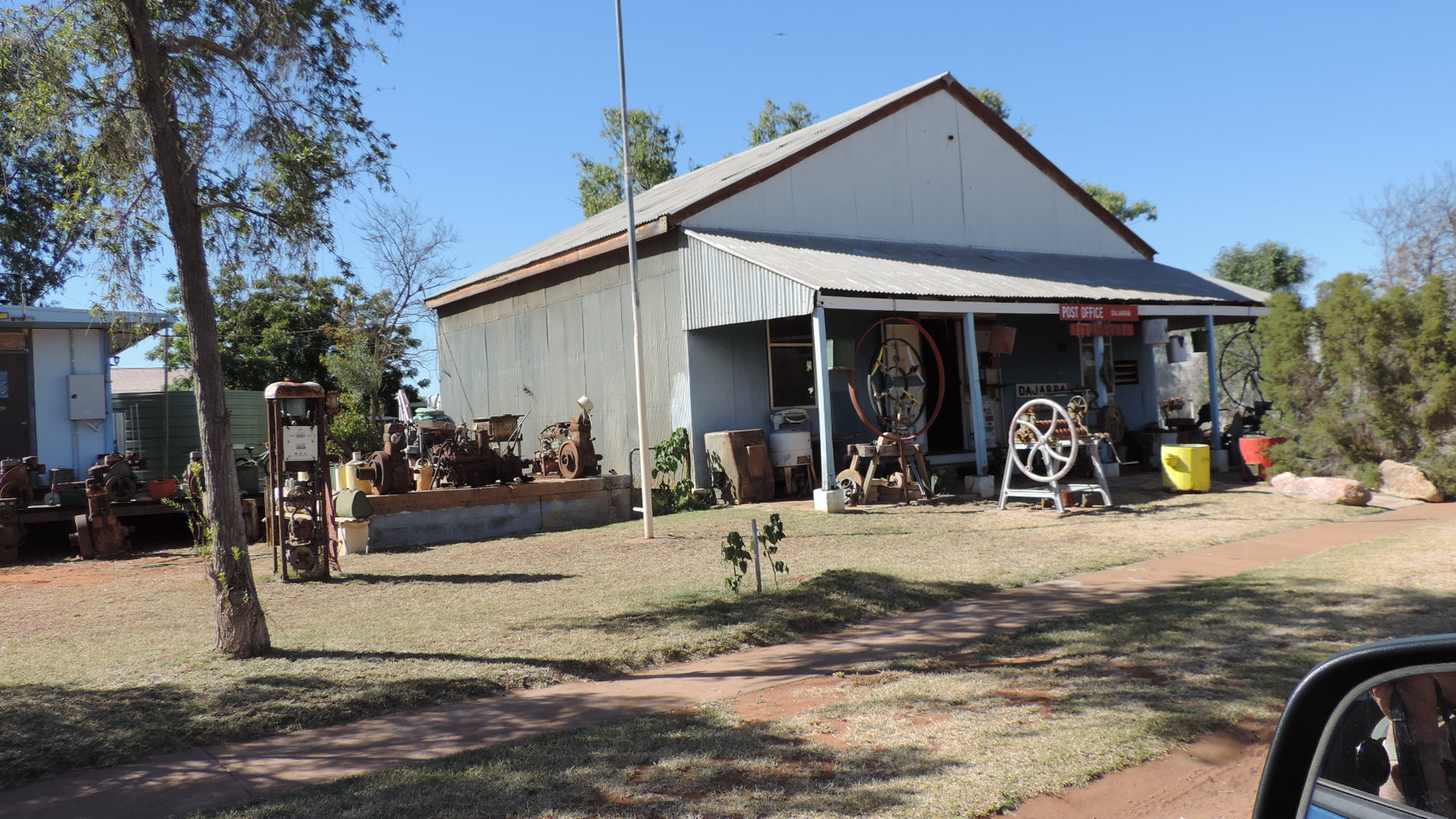
Post Office Museum, 2019

The Post Office Museum is at 19 Matheson Street (21.69481°S 139.51398°E).
