= Warluwarra language =

Extinct Australian Aboriginal language

Warluwarra
- Native to: Australia
- Region: Queensland
- Ethnicity: Waluwara
- Extinct: after 2005
- Language family: Pama–Nyungan: Ngarna; South; Warluwarra
- Dialects: Warluwara; Kapula; Parnkarra
- Signed forms: Warluwara Sign Language

Language codes
- ISO 639-3: wrb
- Glottolog: warl1256
- AIATSIS: G10
- ELP: Warluwarra

Warluwarra is an extinct Australian Aboriginal language of Queensland. Waluwarra (also known as Warluwarra, Walugara, and Walukara) is the traditional language region in the local government area of Shire of Boulia, including Walgra Station and Wolga, from Roxborough Downs north to Carandotta Station and Urandangi on the Georgina River, on Moonah Creek to Rochedale, south-east of Pituri Creek.

== Sign ==
The Warluwara had a developed signed form of their language.

== Phonology ==
=== Consonants ===
	Labial	Velar	Dental	Lamino- alveolar	Apico- alveolar	Retroflex
Voiceless stop	p	k	t̪	t̠ʲ	t	ʈ
Voiced stop	b	ɡ	d̪	d̠ʲ	d	ɖ
Nasal	m	ŋ	n̪	n̠ʲ	n	ɳ
Lateral			l̪	l̠ʲ	l	ɭ
Flap					ɾ	
Glide	w	ɰ		j		ɻ

- Sounds /t̠ʲ, d̠ʲ, n̠ʲ, l̠ʲ/ are also commonly articulated as laminal [t̻ʲ, d̻ʲ, n̻ʲ, l̻ʲ].
- /t̠ʲ/ may also be heard as a palatal stop [c] in free variation.
- /ɻ/ can also be heard as a non-sibilant fricative [ɻ˔] when in between two front /i/ vowels.
- /j/ can also be heard as voiceless [j̊] or fricative [ç] within voiceless syllable positions. It may also be heard as a voiced fricative [ʝ] when in between two front /i/ vowels.

=== Vowels ===
	Front	Central	Back
High	i, iː		u, uː
Low		a, aː	

Phoneme/Sound	Allophones
/i/ [i]	[ɪ], [ɨ]
/a/ [a]	[ə], [e], [ɛ], [æ], [ɐ], [ɑ], [ɔ], [ɒ]
/u/ [u]	[ʊ], [ʉ]
