= Shire of Boulia =

Coordinates: 22°54′S 139°54′E

- Local government area
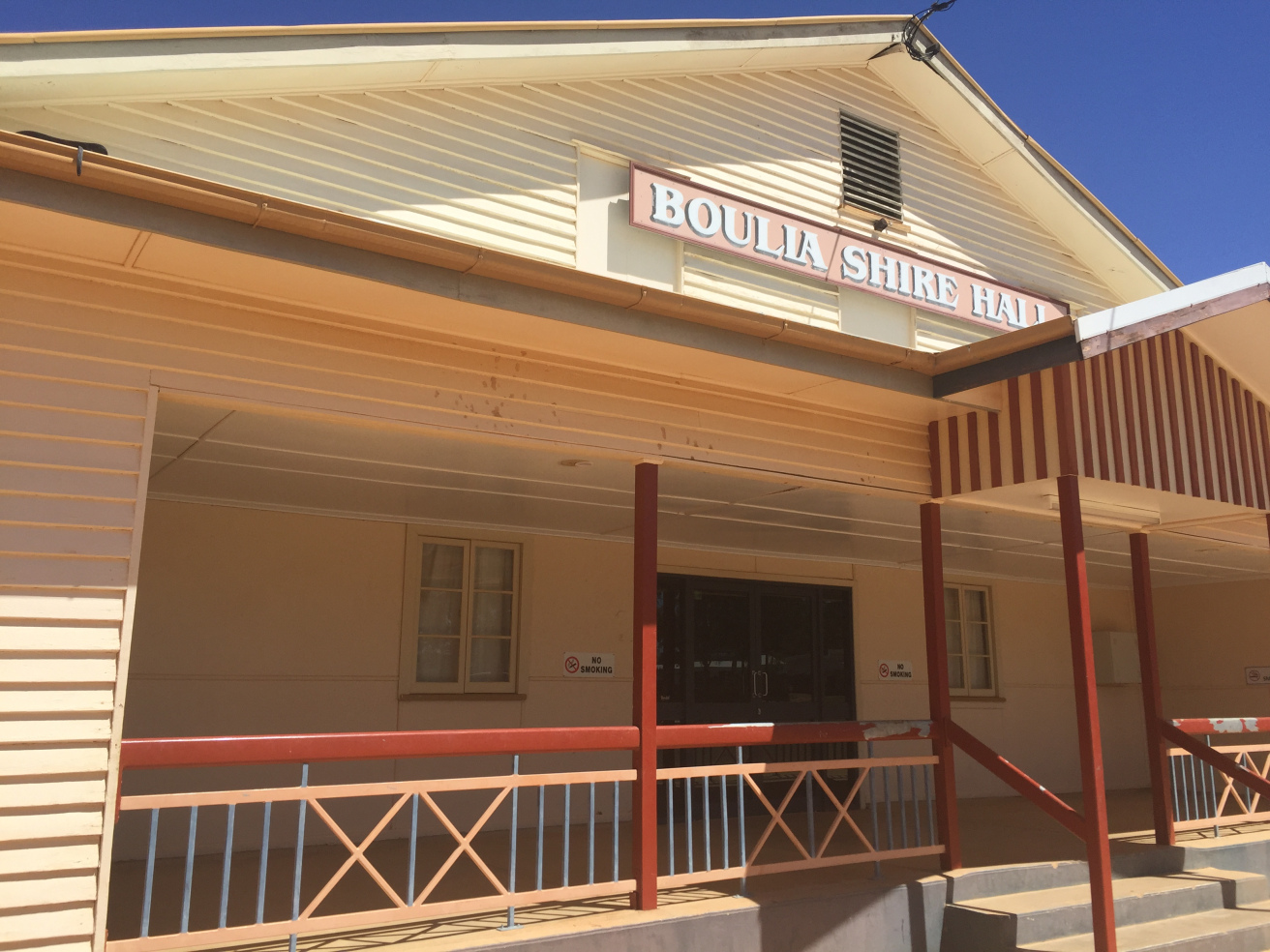
- Boulia Shire Hall, 2016

- Interactive map of Shire of Boulia
- Country: Australia
- State: Queensland
- Region: Central West Queensland
- Established: 1887
- Council seat: Boulia

Government
  - Mayor: Rick Britton
  - State electorate: Gregory
  - Federal division: Kennedy

Area
  - Total: 60,906 km^{2} (23,516 sq mi)

Population
  - Total: 458 (2021 census)
  - Density: 0.007520/km^{2} (0.019476/sq mi)
- Website: Shire of Boulia
LGAs around Shire of Boulia
Barkly (NT)	Mount Isa	Cloncurry
Barkly (NT)	Shire of Boulia	Winton
Central Desert (NT)	Diamantina	Diamantina

The Shire of Boulia is a local government area in Central West Queensland, bordering the Northern Territory. Its administrative centre is in the town of Boulia.

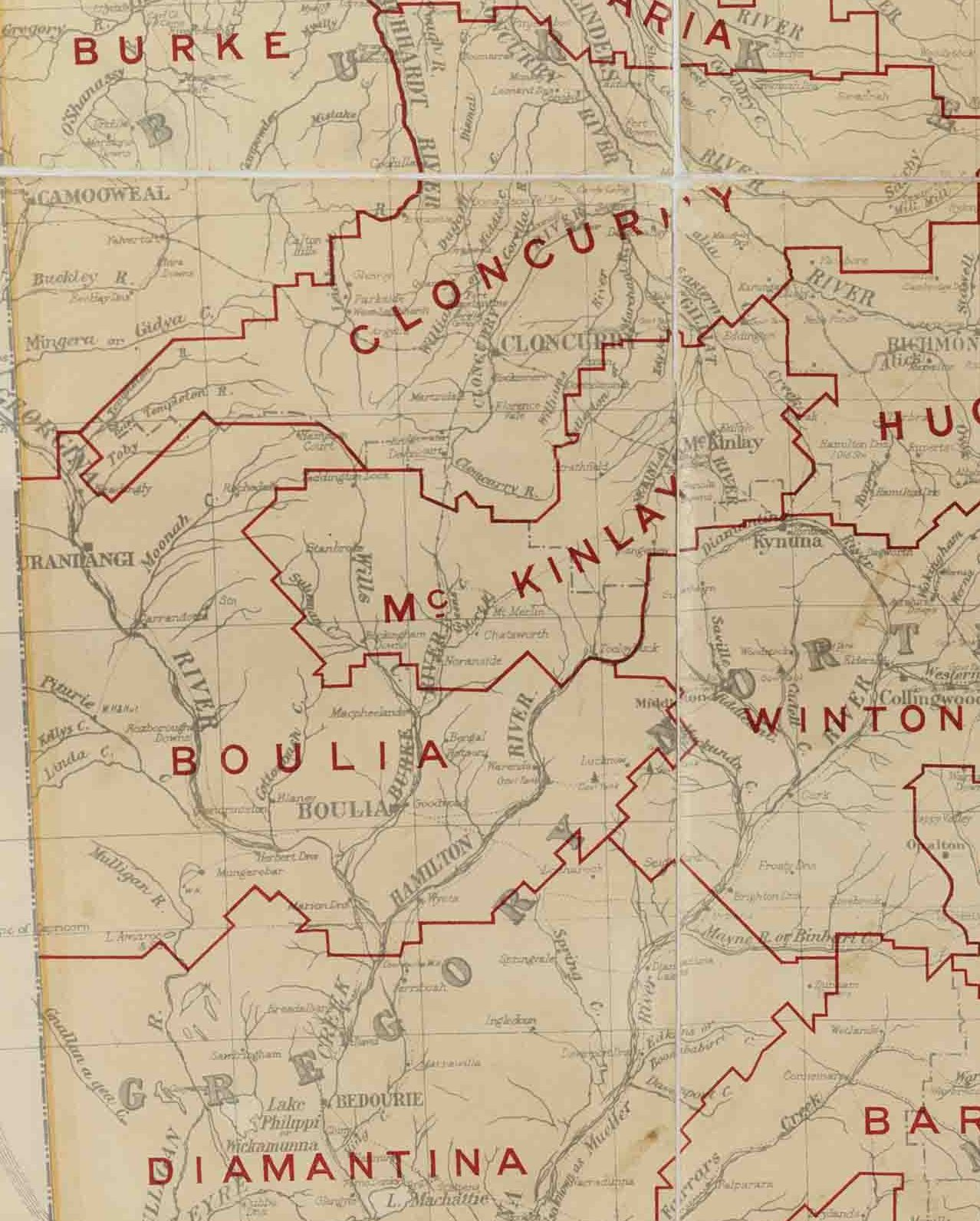
Map of Boulia Division and adjacent local government areas, March 1902

It covers an area of 60,906 square kilometres (23,515.9 sq mi), and has existed as a local government entity since 1887. The main industry in the shire is beef production.

The shire is known for the unexplained phenomenon of the Min Min light, a light that has been reported to follow travellers in the area for some distance before disappearing.

On its logo, the Shire has the motto E pluribus unum.

In the 2021 census, the Shire of Boulia had a population of 458 people.

== History ==
Waluwarra (also known as Warluwarra, Walugara, and Walukara) is an Australian Aboriginal language of Western Queensland. Its traditional language region is the local government area of Shire of Boulia, including Walgra Station and Wolga, from Roxborough Downs north to Carandotta Station and Urandangi on the Georgina River, on Moonah Creek to Rochedale, south-east of Pituri Creek.

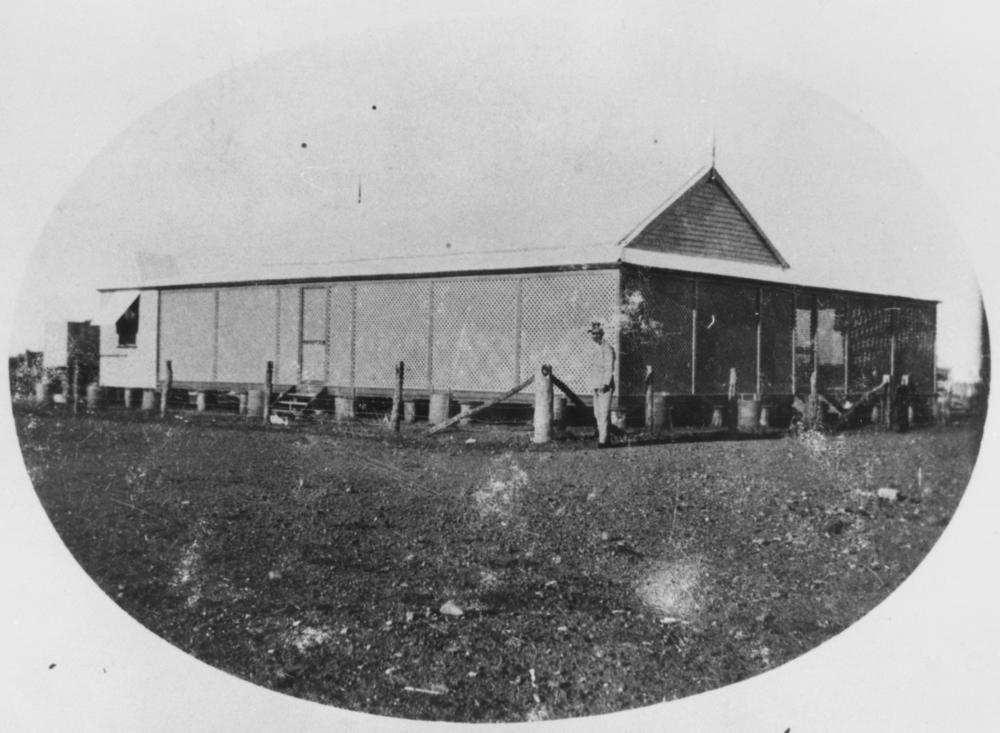
Boulia Divisional Board Hall, ca. 1900.

The Boulia Division was established on 24 September 1887.

On 31 March 1903, Boulia Division became the Shire of Boulia.

== Towns and localities ==
The Shire of Boulia includes the following settlements:

- Boulia
- Amaroo
- Georgina
- Min Min
- Piturie
- Toko
- Urandangi
- Warburton
- Warenda
- Waverley

== Amenities ==
Boulia Shire Council operates a public library in Boulia.

The Boulia Shire Hall is in Herbert Street and can be hired for functions.

== Demographics ==
Year	Population	Notes
1933	604	
1947	676	
1954	764	
1961	833	
1966	645	
1971	755	
1976	635	
1981	600	
1986	583	
1991	575	
1996	550	
2001 census	640	
2006 census	419	
2011 census	480	
2016 census	426	
2021 census	458	

== Chairmen and mayors ==
- 1918: Joseph Richard Coghlan
- 1927: James Griffith Scholefield
- 2008–present: Eric Charles (Rick) Britton

== Gallery ==
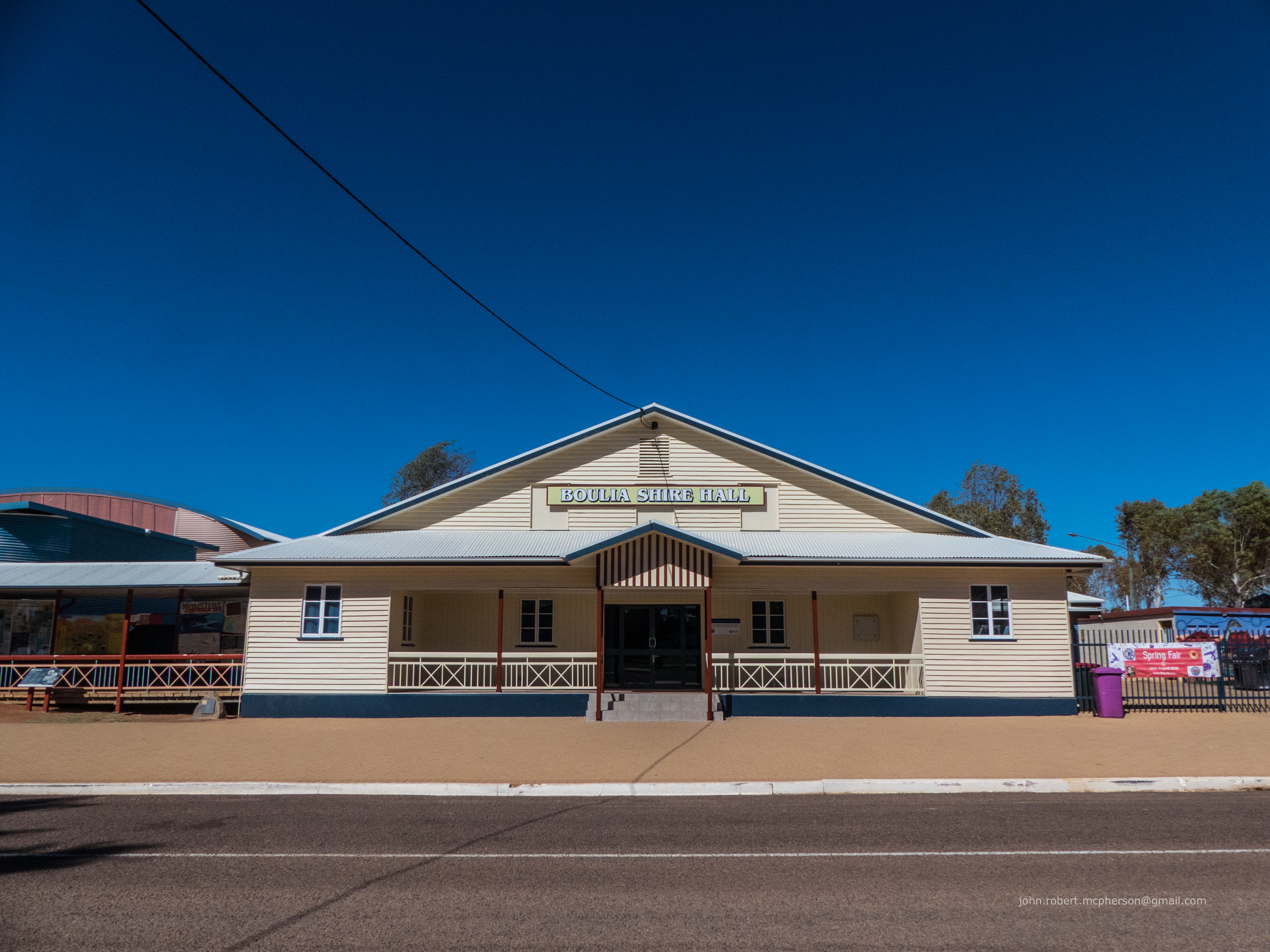
Boulia Shire Hall, Herbert Street, Boulia.

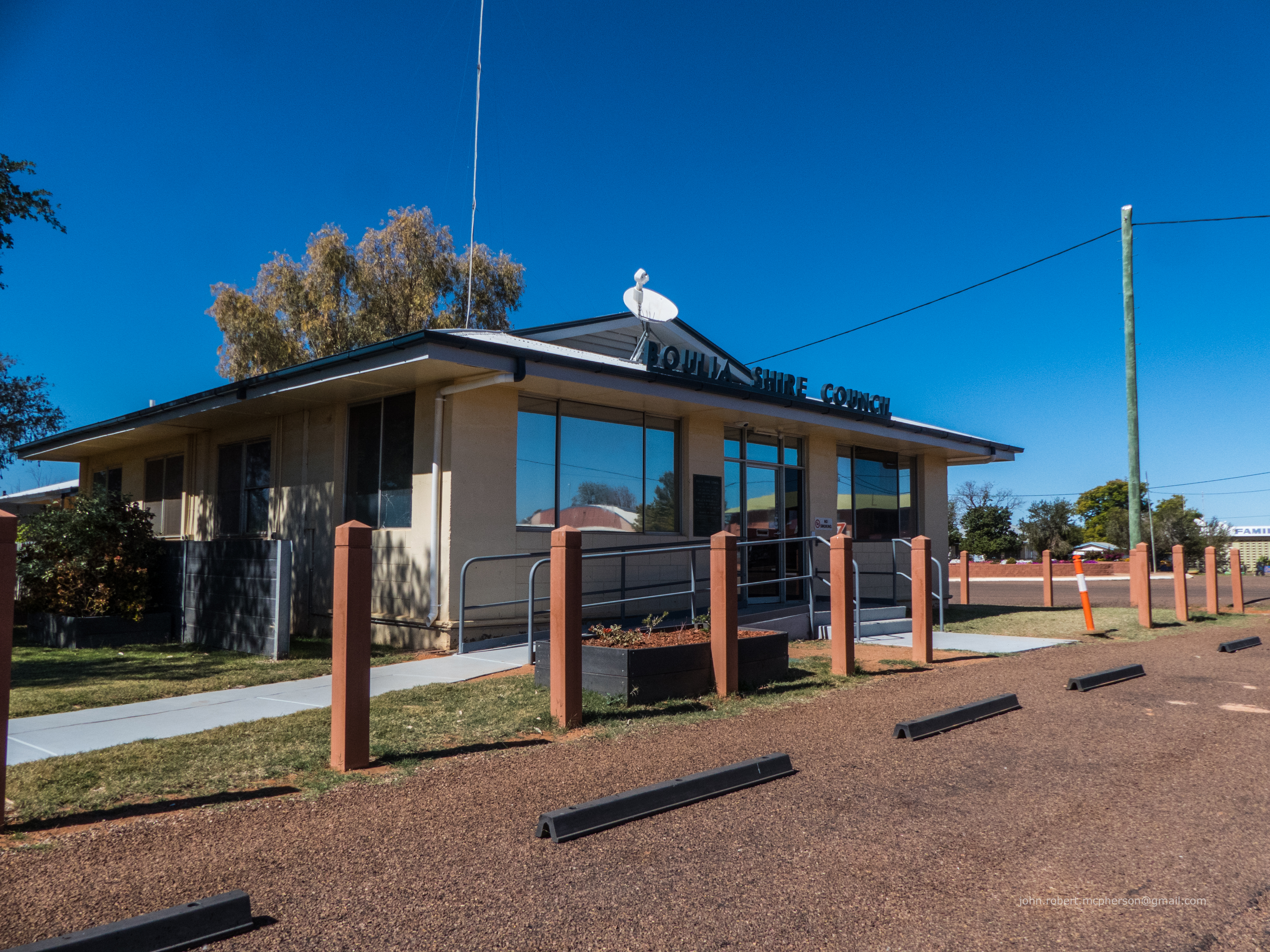
Boulia Shire Council Office, Burke Street, Boulia.

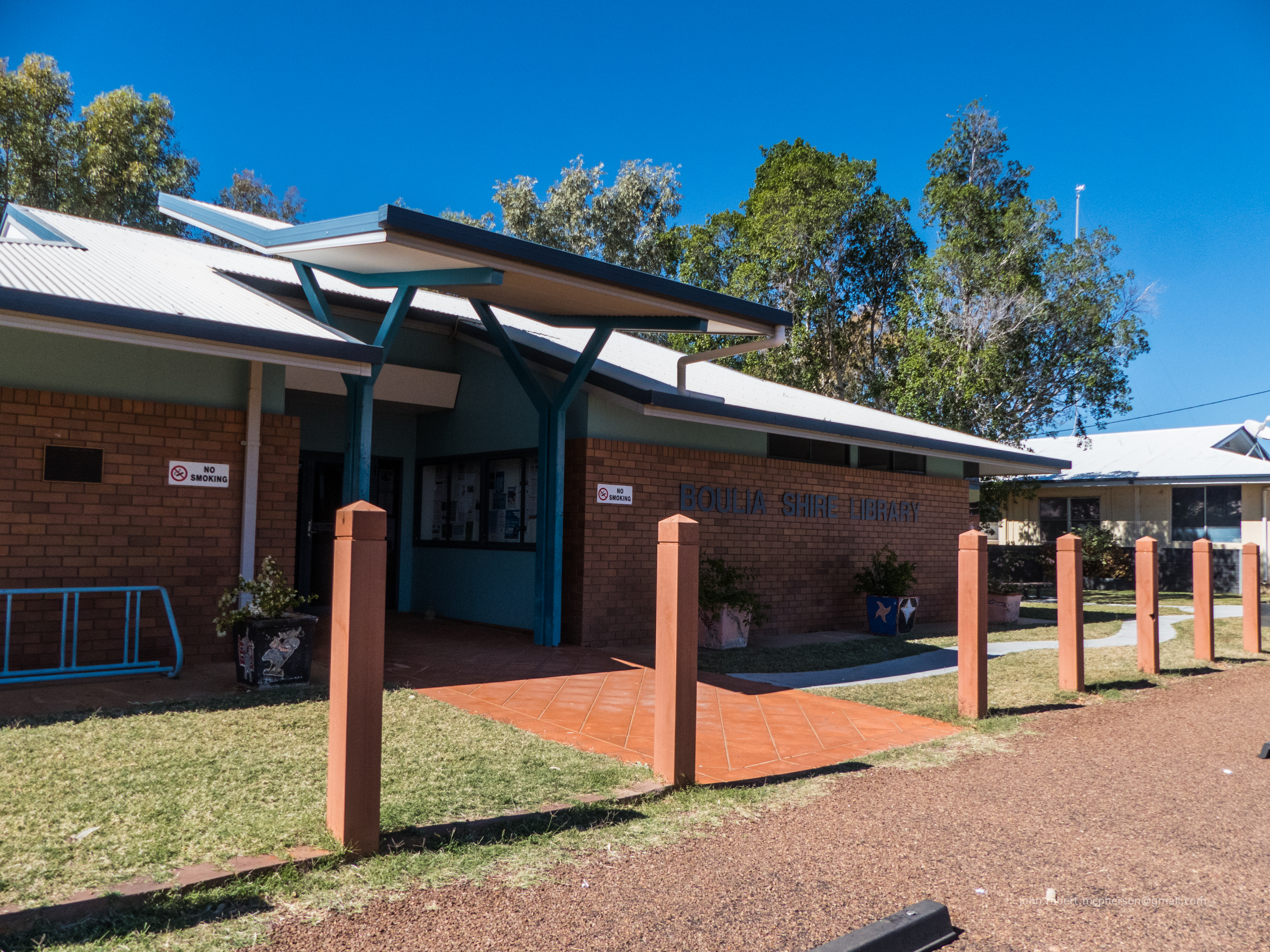
Boulia Shire Council Library, Burke Street, Boulia.

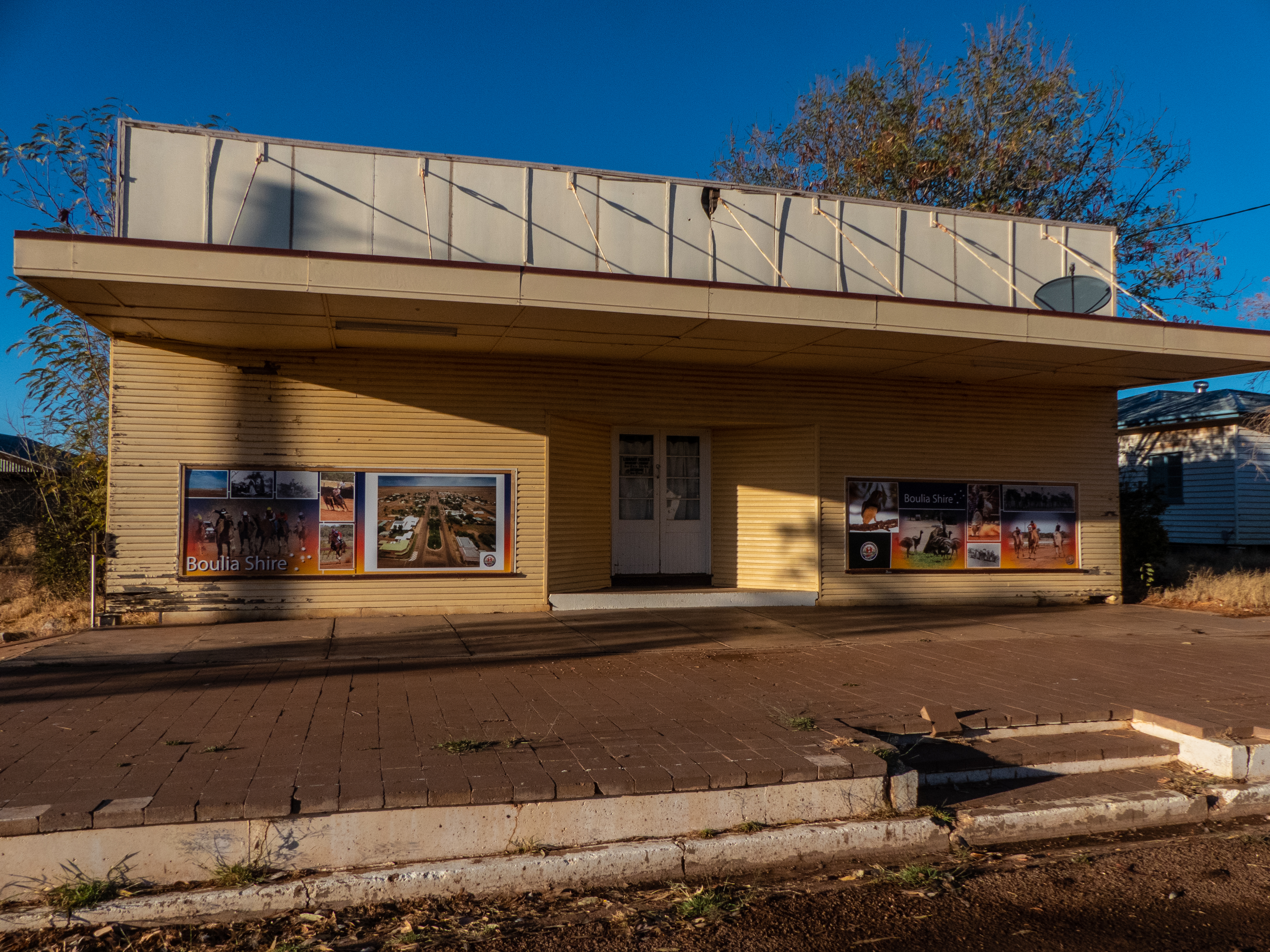
Former Boulia library, Diamantina Developmental Road, Boulia.

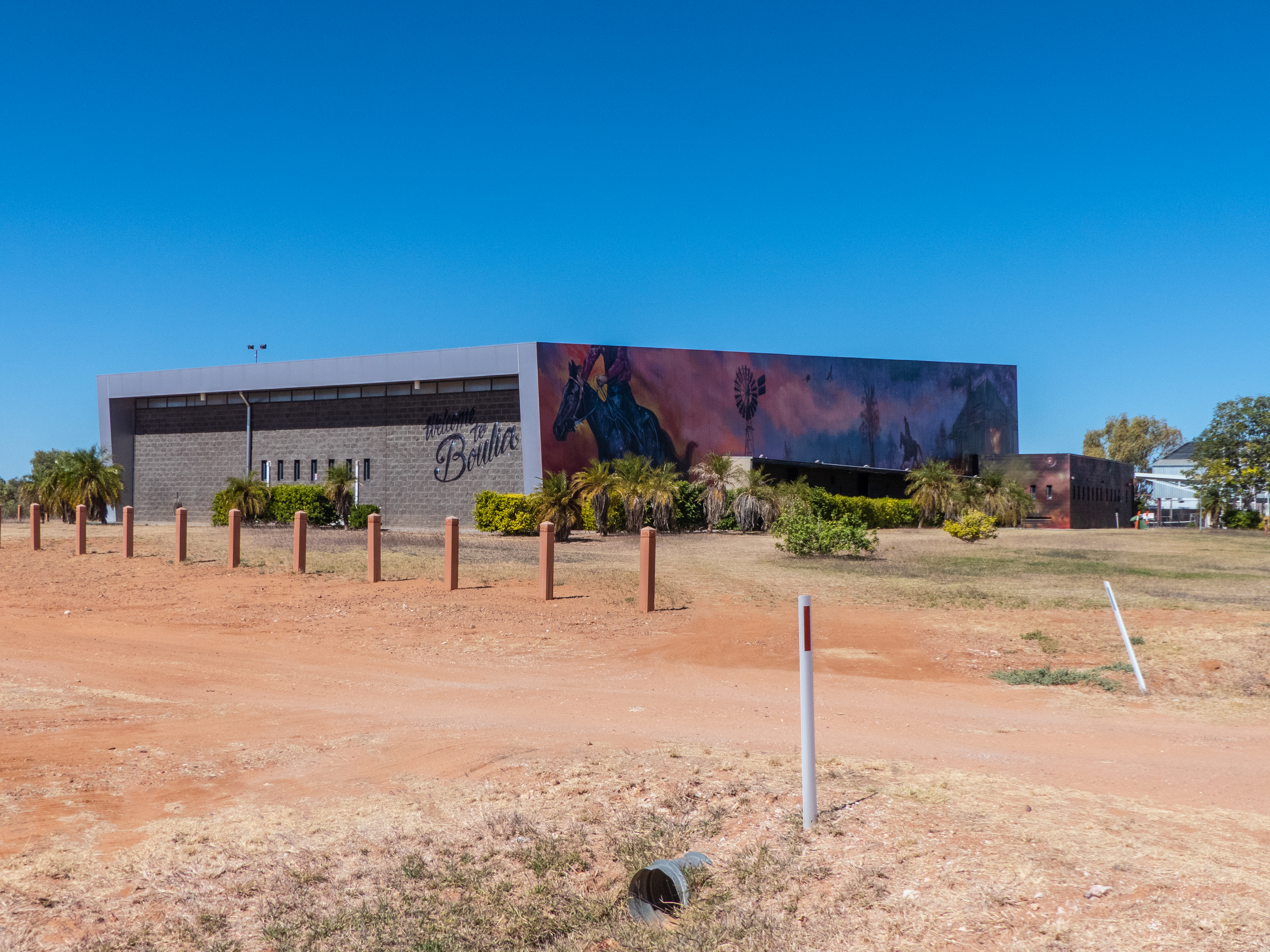
Boulia Sports and Aquatic Centre, Burke Street, Boulia.
