= Urandangi =

- Town
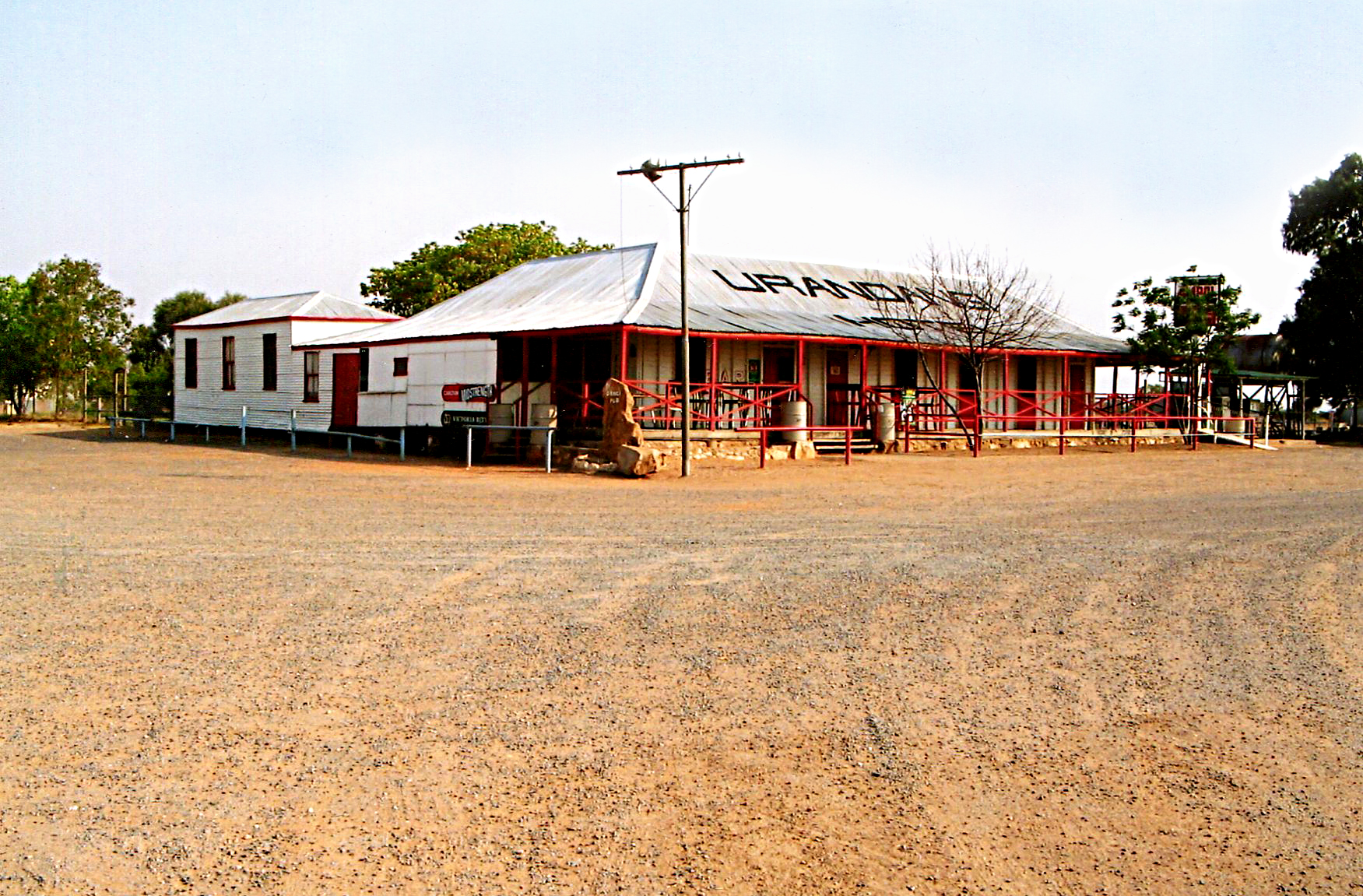
- Urandangi Hotel in 2004

- Coordinates: 21.6083°S 138.3141°E
- Country: Australia
- State: Queensland
- LGA: Shire of Boulia
- Location: 159 km (99 mi) W of Dajarra; 187 km (116 mi) SW of Mount Isa; 2,007 km (1,247 mi) NW of Brisbane
- Established: 1885

Government
  - State electorate: Gregory
  - Federal division: Kennedy
- Elevation: 179 m (587 ft)
- Time zone: UTC+10:00 (AEST)
- Postcode: 4824
- Mean max temp: 33.7 °C (92.7 °F)
- Mean min temp: 16.5 °C (61.7 °F)
- Annual rainfall: 309.7 mm (12.19 in)

Urandangi (formerly also spelled Urandangie) is an outback town in the locality of Piturie in the Shire of Boulia, Queensland, Australia.

== Geography ==
The town is located on the banks of the Georgina River in Central West Queensland, 2,007 kilometres (1,247 mi) north west of the state capital, Brisbane and 187 kilometres (116 mi) south west of the regional centre of Mount Isa.

Urandangi is in the Channel Country. All watercourses in this area are part of the Lake Eyre drainage basin, and most will dry up before their water reaches Lake Eyre.

The predominant land use is grazing on native vegetation.

The Marmanya Aboriginal community is located in Urandangi.

=== Climate ===
Urandangi has a subtropical desert climate (Köppen: BWh) with very hot, erratically wetter summers and very mild, very winters. On average, the town is extremely sunny, experiencing 199.4 clear days and only 50.5 cloudy days per annum. The wettest recorded day was 16 December 1984 with 164.0 mm (6.46 in) of rainfall. Extreme temperatures ranged from 47.5 °C (117.5 °F) on 18 December 2019 to −2.0 °C (28.4 °F) on 30 June 2002 and 5 July 1984.

The original weather station has data available for precipitation (from 1891), temperature (from 1938) and 3 pm conditions (from 1938); but lacks recorded climate data after 2012.

Climate data for Urandangi (21.61°S 138.31°E) (174 m (571 ft) AMSL) (1891-2012)
Month	Jan	Feb	Mar	Apr	May	Jun	Jul	Aug	Sep	Oct	Nov	Dec	Year
Record high °C (°F)	46.6 (115.9)	45.7 (114.3)	43.8 (110.8)	40.4 (104.7)	37.8 (100.0)	35.0 (95.0)	35.0 (95.0)	38.0 (100.4)	41.3 (106.3)	43.7 (110.7)	45.6 (114.1)	47.0 (116.6)	47.0 (116.6)
Mean daily maximum °C (°F)	38.5 (101.3)	37.1 (98.8)	35.6 (96.1)	32.4 (90.3)	27.5 (81.5)	24.3 (75.7)	24.0 (75.2)	26.8 (80.2)	31.3 (88.3)	35.1 (95.2)	37.4 (99.3)	38.8 (101.8)	32.4 (90.3)
Mean daily minimum °C (°F)	24.0 (75.2)	23.3 (73.9)	21.0 (69.8)	16.7 (62.1)	12.0 (53.6)	8.3 (46.9)	7.0 (44.6)	8.8 (47.8)	13.0 (55.4)	17.5 (63.5)	20.5 (68.9)	22.7 (72.9)	16.2 (61.2)
Record low °C (°F)	12.2 (54.0)	14.3 (57.7)	9.1 (48.4)	5.8 (42.4)	0.8 (33.4)	−2.0 (28.4)	−2.0 (28.4)	−1.7 (28.9)	1.5 (34.7)	6.2 (43.2)	7.7 (45.9)	11.3 (52.3)	−2.0 (28.4)
Average precipitation mm (inches)	62.8 (2.47)	66.3 (2.61)	42.9 (1.69)	13.1 (0.52)	12.2 (0.48)	9.3 (0.37)	10.2 (0.40)	4.4 (0.17)	6.3 (0.25)	14.3 (0.56)	22.2 (0.87)	38.9 (1.53)	302.6 (11.91)
Average precipitation days (≥ 0.2 mm)	5.3	5.4	3.7	1.4	1.3	1.3	1.1	0.9	1.3	2.4	3.1	4.1	31.3
Average afternoon relative humidity (%)	27	33	29	26	29	30	27	21	18	18	19	22	25
Average dew point °C (°F)	13.2 (55.8)	14.8 (58.6)	11.9 (53.4)	8.3 (46.9)	6.1 (43.0)	4.3 (39.7)	1.9 (35.4)	0.8 (33.4)	2.0 (35.6)	3.7 (38.7)	6.3 (43.3)	9.3 (48.7)	6.9 (44.4)
Source: Bureau of Meteorology (1891-2012)

A newer weather station at the town's aerodrome opened in 2012. It records temperature and precipitation data.

Climate data for Urandangi Aerodrome (21.60°S 138.37°E) (179 m (587 ft) AMSL) (2012-2025)
Month	Jan	Feb	Mar	Apr	May	Jun	Jul	Aug	Sep	Oct	Nov	Dec	Year
Record high °C (°F)	47.3 (117.1)	45.6 (114.1)	45.6 (114.1)	40.3 (104.5)	38.1 (100.6)	35.1 (95.2)	35.6 (96.1)	39.1 (102.4)	41.5 (106.7)	44.4 (111.9)	45.0 (113.0)	47.5 (117.5)	47.5 (117.5)
Mean daily maximum °C (°F)	39.3 (102.7)	38.4 (101.1)	37.2 (99.0)	33.7 (92.7)	28.7 (83.7)	25.2 (77.4)	25.3 (77.5)	28.3 (82.9)	32.7 (90.9)	36.9 (98.4)	38.7 (101.7)	39.8 (103.6)	33.7 (92.6)
Mean daily minimum °C (°F)	25.3 (77.5)	23.5 (74.3)	21.8 (71.2)	16.6 (61.9)	11.9 (53.4)	8.0 (46.4)	6.5 (43.7)	8.2 (46.8)	13.1 (55.6)	17.5 (63.5)	21.3 (70.3)	24.1 (75.4)	16.5 (61.7)
Record low °C (°F)	16.6 (61.9)	15.2 (59.4)	13.6 (56.5)	4.6 (40.3)	1.5 (34.7)	−1.2 (29.8)	−1.4 (29.5)	0.1 (32.2)	1.6 (34.9)	4.7 (40.5)	10.1 (50.2)	12.6 (54.7)	−1.4 (29.5)
Average precipitation mm (inches)	52.3 (2.06)	57.6 (2.27)	66.5 (2.62)	6.8 (0.27)	4.3 (0.17)	12.8 (0.50)	6.7 (0.26)	5.2 (0.20)	10.2 (0.40)	6.7 (0.26)	25.6 (1.01)	55.3 (2.18)	309.7 (12.19)
Average precipitation days (≥ 0.2 mm)	7.2	5.5	5.2	1.0	1.6	1.9	1.6	0.8	2.0	2.4	4.2	6.4	39.8
Source: Bureau of Meteorology (2012-2025)

== History ==
Waluwarra (also known as Warluwarra, Walugara, and Walukara) is an Australian Aboriginal language of Western Queensland. Its traditional language region is the local government area of Shire of Boulia, including Walgra Station and Wolga, from Roxborough Downs north to Carandotta Station and Urandangi on the Georgina River, on Moonah Creek to Rochedale, south-east of Pituri Creek.

An unnamed township was established 2 August 1883. On 12 December 1884, it was officially named Urandangi. The name is believed to be derived Aboriginal words, uranda-ngie, meaning much gidyea.

The township was a centre for travellers and drovers where a stock route crossed the Georgina River. By 1920 Urandangi had a pub, two stores, post office, police station and a dance hall.

Urandangie Provisional School opened circa 1898. On 1 January 1909 it became Urandangie State School. It closed circa 1910, but reopened on 30 January 1922. It closed circa 1933.

On 11 April 1994 Urandangi State School (slightly different spelling) opened.

In March 2023, Urangangi was inundated with over 7 metres (23 ft) of floodwater resulting in the evacuation of the entire town. Due to the extent of the damage, it is uncertain if the town will survive. In August 2023 and December 2024, the school was officially open but was not operating as there were no students enrolled.

== Facilities ==
In 2023 prior to the floods, Urandangi's only major facility was the Urandangi Hotel (also known as the "Dangi Pub"). It was also the town's post office, grocery store, petrol station, and Centrelink office.

== Education ==
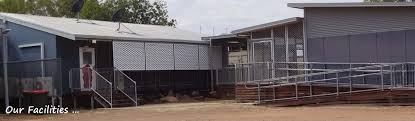
Urandangi State School, 2025

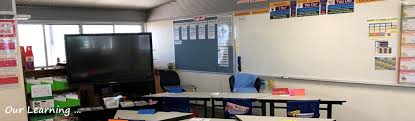
Classroom, 2025

Urandangi State School is a government primary (Early Childhood-6) school for boys and girls on the Urandangi North Road (21.5962°S 138.3359°E). It had only 8 students enrolled in 2015. In 2018, the school had an enrolment of 8 students with 2 teachers and 2 non-teaching staff (1 full-time equivalent). In 2022, the school had an enrolment of 12 students.

There are no secondary schools in Urandangi. The nearest government secondary school is in Mount Isa but too far for a daily commute. The Spinifex State College in Mount Isa offers boarding facilities. Other boarding schools or distance education would be options.
