= Arrernte =

Arrernte (also spelt "Aranda") is a descriptor related to a group of Aboriginal Australian peoples from Central Australia.

It may refer to:

- Arrernte (area), land controlled by the Arrernte Council (?)
- Arrernte people, Aboriginal Australians who speak Arrernte language
- Arrernte language, a dialect cluster spoken in the southern Northern Territory and some adjoining states, and includes:
  - Central Arrernte/Eastern Arrernte, spoken around Alice Springs
  - Western Arrernte
  - Lower Arrernte, also known as Lower Southern Arrernte
  - Southern Arrernte
