= Andegerebinha dialect =

Australian Aboriginal language

Andegerebinha
- Andegerebenha, Andigibinha, Antekerrepenhe, Antekerrepinhe
- Native to: Australia
- Region: Northern Territory, Hay River, Pituri Creek area, east of Alyawarra.
- Extinct: by 2016
- Language family: Pama–Nyungan: Arandic; Aranda; Upper Arrernte; Andegerebinha
- Dialects: Ayerrerenge †

Language codes
- ISO 639-3: adg – inclusive code Individual code: axe – Ayerrerenge
- Glottolog: ande1247
- AIATSIS: C12
- ELP: Antekerrepenh

The Andegerebinha language, also known as Andegerebenha, Andigibinha, Antekerrepenhe and Antekerrepinhe, is an Australian Aboriginal language of the Northern Territory, specifically of the Upper Arrernte language group. It was spoken around the Hay River (east of Alice Springs) and Pituri Creek area. It was spoken by only ten individuals in 1981, five in 2005, and in the 2016 census there were no fluent speakers of the language, so is now classified as dormant.

A study of its sound system was published in 1977 by Gavan Breen, which he revisited in 2001, saying that the phonology is now regarded as similar to Central Arrernte.

- Ayerrerenge (or Ayerrereng or Araynepenh, and also known as Yuruwinga, Bularnu and other variations) was spoken by the Yuruwinga/Yaroinga people, is the north-easternmost member of the Arrernte group of languages, and the least studied. It was spoken across the Queensland border in the Headingly, Urandangi, Lake Nash, Barkly Downs and Mount Isa areas, and near Mount Hogarth, Bathurst, and Argadargada in the NT. It is now extinct. According to Glottolog, quoting Breen (1977 and 2001): "E17/E18/E19 has a separate entry for Ayerrerenge [axe]. But Ayerrerenge is an Arandic variety subsumed under the entry Andegerebinha [adg]". Breen notes that three of the speakers of Ayerrereng recorded in 1960 called their language Antekerrepenhe, and Glottolog regards it as a dialect of it.
