= Arandic languages =

Australian Aboriginal language family

Arandic
- Geographic distribution: Northern Territory, northern South Australia
- Linguistic classification: Pama–Nyungan: Arandic–Thura-Yura; Arandic
- Subdivisions: Arrernte group; Lower Arrernte; Pertame; Kaytetye

Language codes
- Glottolog: aran1267
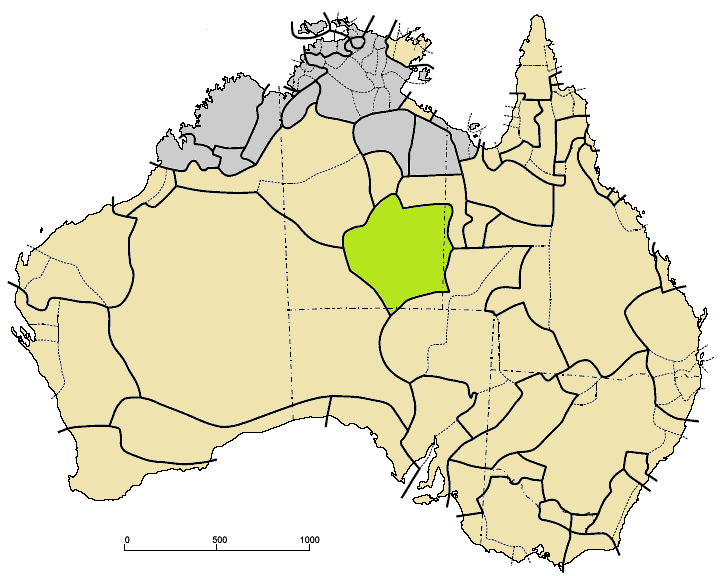
- Arandic languages (green) among other Pama–Nyungan (tan)

Arandic is a family of Australian Aboriginal languages consisting of several languages or dialect clusters, including the Arrernte (Upper Arrernte) group, Lower Arrernte (also known as Lower Southern Arrernte), Pertame language (also known as Southern Arrernte) and Kaytetye.

== Languages ==
- Upper Arrernte (or just Arrernte) dialect cluster, with five or six main dialects, with the most dominant being Central or Eastern Arrernte, which is spoken in and around Alice Springs (Mparntwe) itself.
- Lower Arrernte, also known as Alenjerrntarpe and Lower Southern Arrernte, was spoken by the people around the Finke River area, but it is now extinct. The last speaker was Brownie Doolan, from whom Gavan Breen managed to write up a dictionary of roughly 1000 words. According to AIATSIS, this was a clearly distinct language.
- Pertame, also known as Southern Arrernte, is from the country south of Alice Springs, along the Finke River, north and north-west of the location of speakers of Lower Arrernte. With only 20 fluent speakers left by 2018, the Pertame Project is seeking to retain and revive the language, headed by Pertame elder Christobel Swan. Renowned artist Erlikilyika (Jim Kite) was a Pertame speaker. Ethnologue classes Pertame as a variant name for Lower Southern, but other sources vary in their classifications and descriptions of this language.
- Kaytetye, spoken near Barrow Creek and Tennant Creek by the Kaytetye people, had only 120 speakers in the 2016 census, and the number has been decreasing.

== Differing classifications ==
There are differing opinions as to which are dialects and which separate languages, among linguists and among the Arrernte people themselves.

- Koch (2004) only distinguished two dialects, Upper Arrernte and Katetye.
- Glottolog defines the Arandic group as comprising five Aranda (also known as Arrernte) dialects, plus two distinct languages, Kaytetye (Koch, 2006) and Lower Southern (or just Lower) Aranda, an extinct language.
- Ethnologue defines eight Arandic languages and classifies them slightly differently.

== Proto-language ==
Proto-Arandic
- Reconstruction of: Arandic languages
- Reconstructed ancestor: Proto-Pama–Nyungan

Proto-Arandic and Pre-Arandic reconstructions from Koch (2004):

| gloss | Proto-Arandic | Pre-Arandic |
|---|---|---|
| armpit | *ilhenpe | *CilhVnpV |
| blood | *arrknge | *CVrrngV |
| brain | *ake+urrnge | *kaka+CurrngV |
| breast | *atye | *CatyV |
| egg | *ukarte | *muka+artV |
| face | *inngerre | *NinngVrrV |
| fat | *antere | *NantOrV |
| hand, finger | *iltye | *miltyV “claw” |
| nasal mucus | *yungkel | *CYungkVl |
| sweat | *anytyeye | *CantyVyV |
| tendon | *alurrnge | *CalO+CurrngV |
| thigh | *uylepere | *warli+pVrV |
| throat | *ahentye | *CaakVntyV |
| man | *urte | *CurtO |
| person, woman? | *arelhe | *CarVlhV |
| female | *amarle | *ngama+arlV |
| dreaming | *altyerre | *CaltyVrrV |
| camp | *apmere | *TamVrV |
| single men's camp | *arnkentye | *CarnkVntyV |
| single women's camp | *arlwekere ? | *CurlVkVrV/*wa- |
| father's father | *arrenge | *CarrVngV |
| father-in-law | *ahenterre | *CaakVntVrrV |
| mother's father | *atye, itye | *CEtyV |
| cousin (female) | *altyele | *CaltyVlV |
| cousin (male) | *a(t)nkele | *CankOlV |
| sister-in-law (of f?) | *arntenge | *NarntOngV |
| axe | *ilepe | *CilOpV |
| digging stick | *atneme | *kana+m(p)V |
| spindle | *ante *unte | *CuntO |
| rabbit bandicoot tail-tip | *alpiyte? | *CalpV+CV(r)ti |
| ant bed | *ungkepeye | *mungka+pVyV |
| burrow | *ulhenge | *ngulha+ngV |
| cave | *inteye | *CintVyV |
| cliff | *arnke | *CarnkV |
| coals | *(a)perrke | *CapVrrkV |
| delicacy, honey | *ungkarle | *NungkaarlV |
| flame | *inthe | *CinthV |
| gap | *utatye | *CutaatyV/*wa- |
| ground | *ahe- | *CaakV- |
| rainbow | *umperlarre | *CumpVrlV- |
| road | *iyteye | *Ci(r)tiyV |
| rock hole | *arnerre | *NarnOrrV |
| sun | *aherrke | *CaakVrrkV |
| east | *Vkngerre | *kangarra ! |
| west | *alte- | *CaltO- |
| far | *arlenge | *CarlOngV |
| down, under, inside | *ukene | *CukVnV/*wa- |
| blind | *upenge | *CupVngV /*wa- |
| dangerous | *ahe+ | *CaakV- |
| dried out, desiccated | *aynterrke | *Ca(r)ntirrkV |
| empty | *urlte | *CurltV |
| frightened | *atere | *CatOrV |
| knowing | *akaltye | *kaka+CaltyV |
| point | *arriylpe | *Rirra+Ci(r)lpi |
| raw | *arletye | *CarlOtyV |
| sick, be in pain | *arnte- | *CarntO- |
| sleep | *u(t)nke | *CunkO /*wa- |
| smooth | *alyelke | *CalyVlkV |

=== Verbs ===
| gloss | Proto-Arandic | Pre-Arandic |
|---|---|---|
| bite | *utnhe- | *TunhV- |
| chase | *ule(rne)- | *CulO- |
| copulate with | *Vnte(rne)- | *CVntV- |
| cut off | *urnte(rne)- | *CurntO- |
| get stuck in | *ume(rne)- | *NumO- |
| go about (in search of) | *u(t)nthe- | *CunthV- |
| insert | *uke(rne)- | *CukV-/*wakV- |
| make, fix | *umpare - | *CumpV+CarV- |
| manipulate in coolamon? | *aynpe- / *arnpe- | *Ca(r)npi- |
| pluck, clear of feathers | *althe- | *CalthV- |
| put (down) | *arre(rne)- | *CVrrV- |
| put foot down, move off | *arnpe- | *CarnpO- |
| put high | *utye(rne)- | *CYutyV-? |
| return | *alpe- | *CalpO-? |
| see | *are- | *miira-? |
| shine (on) | *arrtye- | *CVrrtyV- |
| sing | *ayle- | *Ca(r)li- |
| swallow | *uke(rne)- | *CukV-/*wakV- |
| tie | *irrtye- | *CVrrtyV- |

=== Plants ===
| Scientific name | Common name | Proto-Arandic | Pre-Arandic |
|---|---|---|---|
| Eucalyptus opaca | desert bloodwood | *arrke | *CarrkV |
| Eucalyptus coolabah | | *ankerre | *CankOrrV |
| green grass | | *atherrke | *CathVrrkV |
| Acacia aneura | mulga | *artetye | *CartOtyV |
| Ventilago viminalis | supplejack | *atnyere | *TanyVrV |
| Ficus platypoda | wild fig | *wityerrke/*yu- | *wityVrrkV /*CYu- |
| Canthium latifolium | native currant | *ahakeye | *CaakaakVyV |
| Acacia kempeana | witchetty bush | *atnyeme | *TanyVmV |
| Acacia ligulata | umbrella bush | *arterrke | *CartOrrkV |
| Acacia tetragonophylla | dead finish | *arlketyerre | *CarlkOtyVrrV |
| Acacia victoriae | acacia bush | *urlepe?, *arlepe | *COrlOpV |
| Atalaya hemiglauca | whitewood | *arlperre | *CarlpOrrV |
| Boerhavia spp. | tar vine | *ayepe | *CayVpV |
| Grevillea striata | beefwood | *iyltentye | *Ci(r)ltintyV |
| Hakea chordophylla | northern corkwood | *untyeye | *CuntyVyV /*wa- |

=== Animals ===
| gloss | Proto-Arandic | Pre-Arandic |
|---|---|---|
| dingo | *urtnere | *TurnOrV |
| Jew lizard | *ankerte | *CankOrtV |
| kangaroo | *aherre | *CaakVrrV |
| crested pigeon | *apelkere /-ure? | *CapVlkVrV |
| honey ant | *yerr+ampe? | *CVyVrrV+ |
| termites, white ants | *interrke | *CintOrrkV |

== Bibliography ==
- Dixon, R. M. W. (2002). Australian Languages: Their Nature and Development. Cambridge University Press.
