= Arrernte sign language =

Aboriginal sign language of central Australia

Arrernte Sign Language
- Aranda Sign Language
- Iltyeme-iltyeme
- Region: Central Northern Territory
- Native speakers: None
- Language family: Pama–Nyungan: Arandic; Arrernte; Arrernte Sign Language

Language codes
- ISO 639-3: –
- Glottolog: None

Arrernte Sign Language, or Aranda Sign Language, also known as Iltyeme-iltyeme (handsigns), is a highly developed Australian Aboriginal sign language used by the Arrernte people of central Australia.

Ilyeme-iltyeme is not generally used as a primary method of communication but used alongside speech, gesture and drawing practices. The language was first documented by Carl Strehlow in 1915.

In her 2010 book Iwenhe tyerrtye: what it means to be an Aboriginal person, Margaret Kemarre Turner dedicates a chapter to the Iltyeme-iltyeme and explains how it is used particularly during periods of grief and sorrow by Arrernte people and that it is used more by the older generations and people living on remote communities (rather than in regional centers like Alice Springs). Turner explains that the use of these hand signs are sacred and explains that her mother primarily communicated in hand signs while mourning for her brothers and sisters; of it she says;

Arelhe ampwe mape, those old people still iltyeme-iltyemele angerlte-aneme, they still talk with their hands. And sometimes they take it for a long time by talking with hands. There's a real, real, real, real gentle feeling in that when you're talking with hand, like that person would be just whispering if they were using their voice. People stop talking out loud in sadness time, because they don't want to make the same words or sound - that same sort of sound to get them words out that they used to when those loved ones were still alive. My mother used to talk like that all the time.

— Margaret Kemarre Turner, Iwenhe tyerrtye : what it means to be an Aboriginal person, pp 110 - 111

A similar counterpart in central Australia is Warlpiri Sign Language (Rdaka-rdaka).

== Bibliography ==
- Strehlow, Carl (1915). The sign language of the Aranda. (p. 349–370). (Extracted from Die Aranda-und-Loritja-Stamme in Zentral-Australien, Frankfurt: Baer; translated by C. Chewings. Reprinted (1978) in Aboriginal sign languages of the Americas and Australia New York: Plenum Press, vol. 2.)
