= Akitiri Sign Language =

Australian Aboriginal sign language

- Kaytetye Sign Language
- Eltye eltyarrenke
- Region: Central Northern Territory
- Native speakers: None
- Language family: Pama–Nyungan: Arandic; Kaytetye; Akitiri Sign Language

Language codes
- ISO 639-3: –
- Glottolog: None

Akitiri Sign Language, also known as Eltye eltyarrenke (hand signs), is (or was) a highly developed Australian Aboriginal sign language used by the Kaytetye people of central Australia and it forms part of the Kaytetye language.

Akitiri is often used when speech is impractical or not preferred and this includes when people are communicating across long distances, hunting, when wishing to speak privately and during ceremony and times of mourning. Hand signs are also frequently used alongside speech and is more commonly used by women of the community.

In many Kaytetye communities fluency in Akitiri is highly valued but, due to the impacts of colonisation, use is declining and younger generations often use it in a different or simplified way.

A 2023 project to revitalise the Kaytetye language and Akitiri sign language was the Kaytetyemoji app which created 122 emojis including 44 specific to life on Kaytetye country. These emoji's often directly reflect the hand signs of Akitiri and, as part of the development of the app, many younger generations were taught new signs to them.

== Bibliography ==
- Hale, Ken (c1960s), Original handwritten lexical list, 3pp.; notes on ‘Kaititj: akitiri sign language’, 3pp. in IATSIS library, MS 4114 Miscellaneous Australian notes of Kenneth L. Hale, Series 2 Barkly Tablelands language material, item 1-2 Wampaya [Wambaya (C19)].
