= Pertame language =

Threatened Australian Aboriginal language

Pertame
- Southern Arrernte, Southern Aranda
- Pertame
- Native to: Australia
- Region: South-Eastern Northern Territory, along the Finke River
- Native speakers: <20 (2018); 11-50 (2018-19)
- Revival
- Language family: Pama–Nyungan: Arandic; Pertame

Language codes
- ISO 639-3: None (mis)
- Glottolog: pert1234
- AIATSIS: C46

Pertame, also known as Southern Arrernte or Southern Aranda, is an Arandic language (but not of the Arrernte language group) from the country south of Alice Springs, along the Finke River, north and north-west of the location inhabited by speakers of Lower Arrernte. Ethnologue classes Pertame as a variant name for Lower Southern, but other sources vary in their classifications and descriptions of this language.

== Language revival ==
With only 20 fluent speakers left by 2018, the Pertame Project is seeking to retain and revive the language, headed by Pertame elder Christobel Swan.

As of 2020, Pertame is one of 20 languages prioritised as part of the Priority Languages Support Project, being undertaken by First Languages Australia and funded by the Department of Communications and the Arts. The project aims to "identify and document critically-endangered languages — those languages for which little or no documentation exists, where no recordings have previously been made, but where there are living speakers".

== Speakers ==
Renowned artist Erlikilyika (Jim Kite) was a Pertame speaker.
