= Whistling tree =

Whistling tree may refer to:

- Hakea chordophylla, endemic to Australia
- Casuarina equisetifolia, native to Australia, SE Asia and Oceania

== See also ==
- The Whistler Tree
