= Yaroinga =

The Yaroinga (Yuruwinga) are an Aboriginal Australian people of the Northern Territory.

== Country ==
Yaroinga country covered, according to Tindale's estimation, some 11,900 square miles (31,000 km^{2}), straddling both the Northern Territory and Queensland, at such places in the latter state as Urandangi and Headingly, and as far east as Mount Isa. Their northern limits were around Lake Nash. Westwards they were present at Barkly Downs, Mount Hogarth and Argadargada (now on the northern boundary of Manners Creek Station).

== Language ==
They spoke the Ayerrerenge dialect (also known as Ayerrereng, Araynepenh, Yuruwinga, Bularnu and other variations), regarded as a variation of Andegerebinha, of the Upper Arrernte language group, and now extinct.

== Social organization ==
The Yaroinga were divided into clans, some of whose names are recorded.

- Manda A southern horde in the vicinity near Urandangi

== Alternative names ==
- Jaroinga
- Yarroinga
- Yaringa (a creek name)
- Yorrawinga
- Yarrowin
- Jurangka/Yurangka (Iliaura exonym)
- Manda
- Pulanja (language name)
- Bulanja, Bulanu

== Sources ==
- "G12: Ayerrerenge". AIATSIS.
- Tindale, Norman Barnett (1974). "Jaroinga (NT)". Aboriginal Tribes of Australia: Their Terrain, Environmental Controls, Distribution, Limits, and Proper Names. Australian National University Press. ISBN 978-0-708-10741-6. Archived from the original on 11 October 2017.
