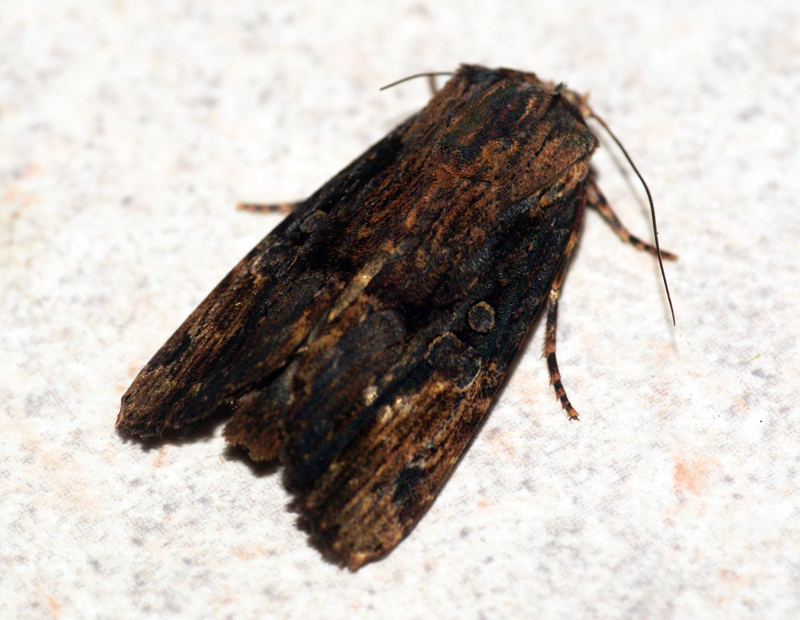

Scientific classification
- Domain: Eukaryota
- Kingdom: Animalia
- Phylum: Arthropoda
- Class: Insecta
- Order: Lepidoptera
- Superfamily: Noctuoidea
- Family: Noctuidae
- Genus: Sasunaga
- Species: S. tenebrosa

Binomial name
- Sasunaga tenebrosa (Moore, 1867)

Synonyms
- Hadena tenebrosa Moore, 1867; Sasunaga albistriga Warren, 1913; Sasunaga longistriata Warren, 1913; Magusa maja Strand, 1916; Magusa kala Strand, 1916; Stictoptera albonotata Wileman & West, 1928

= Sasunaga tenebrosa =

Species of moth

Sasunaga tenebrosa is a moth of the family Noctuidae first described by Frederic Moore in 1867. It is found from the Indian subregion, Sri Lanka to Sundaland, the Philippines and Sulawesi.

== Description ==
Its wingspan is about 36–42 mm. Body dark and reddish brown or black and grey. Forewings with slight streaks in the interspaces. The transverse lines are almost obsolete. Orbicular small, circular, and usually prominent, whereas reniform almost obsolete. There is a dark patch on costa before apex. Apical and basal inner area and angle often greyish or reddish brown. Hindwings fuscous brown.

== Ecology ==
The larvae feed on Ventilago species, and the caterpillar pupates in the soil in a silk cocoon.
