= Supplejack =

Supplejack is a common name for several plants and may refer to:

- Plants in the family Flagellariaceae:
  - Supplejack, Flagellaria indica a bamboo–like vine plant species native to eastern and northern Australia
- Plants in the family Rhamnaceae:
  - Paniculous supplejack, Berchemia racemosa, a climbing plant native to east Asia
  - Alabama supplejack, Berchemia scandens, a climbing plant native to central and southern parts of the United States
  - Supplejack tree, Ventilago viminalis, a tree native to Northern and Central Australia
- Plants in the family Ripogonaceae:
  - Supplejack, Ripogonum scandens, a vine native to New Zealand

== See also ==
- Supplejack Downs, also Suplejack Downs, a pastoral lease in Australia
