= Kaytetye =

Kaytetye may refer to:

- Kaytetye people, an ethnic group of Australia
- Kaytetye language, their language
