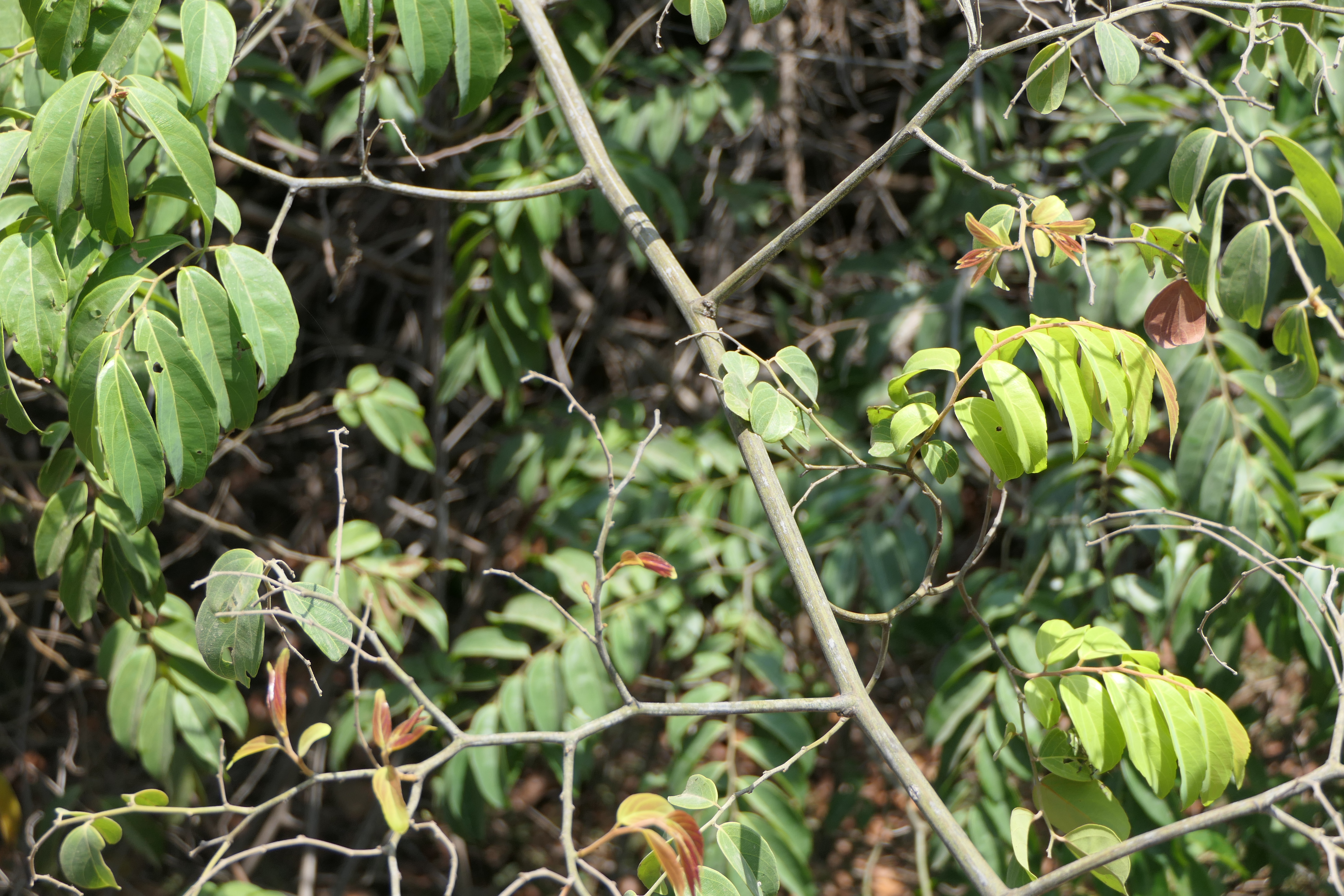

Scientific classification
- Kingdom: Plantae
- Clade: Tracheophytes
- Clade: Angiosperms
- Clade: Eudicots
- Clade: Rosids
- Order: Rosales
- Family: Rhamnaceae
- Genus: Ventilago
- Species: V. madraspatana

Binomial name
- Ventilago madraspatana Gaertn.

= Ventilago madraspatana =

Species of plant

Ventilago madraspatana (Red Creeper) is a climbing shrub or liana which grows in the seasonally dry tropical biome. It is native to India and China. The plant is used in traditional medicines for its anti-inflammatory as well as anticancer potential.

== Description ==
Ventilago madraspatana is a large, woody, evergreen climber with branches hanging down. Its bark is dark grey with vertical cracks. The leaves are pale green and alternate. Inflorescence is axillary and it has terminal panicles. The flowers have an offensive odour.
