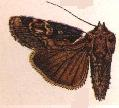

Scientific classification
- Kingdom: Animalia
- Phylum: Arthropoda
- Class: Insecta
- Order: Lepidoptera
- Superfamily: Noctuoidea
- Family: Noctuidae
- Genus: Sasunaga
- Species: S. oenistis

Binomial name
- Sasunaga oenistis (Hampson, 1908)

Synonyms
- Magusa oenistis Hampson, 1908; Magusa oenistis pallida Prout, 1922

= Sasunaga oenistis =

Species of moth

Sasunaga oenistis is a moth of the family Noctuidae. It is found from Sulawesi to Fiji.
