= Erlikilyika =

Australian Aboriginal sculptor (c.1865-c.1930)

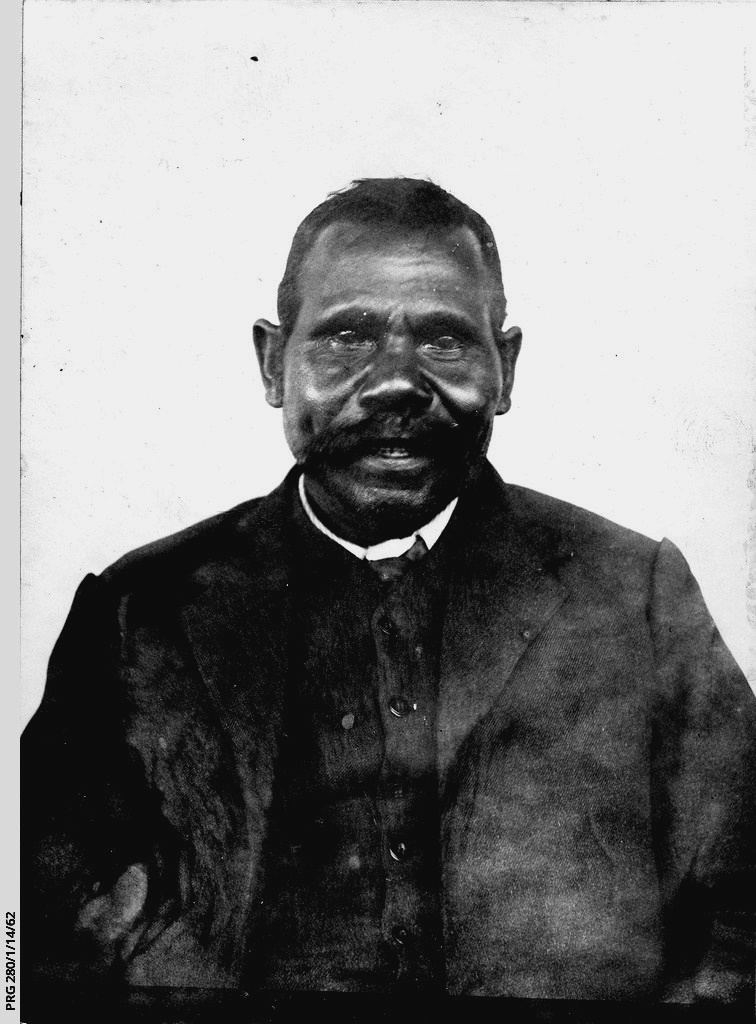
- Born: c.1865 Akeltye (McKenzie's Waterhole), Northern Territory, Australia
- Died: c.1930–1945
- Known for: Sketches, sculpture, anthropology, translation
- Spouse: Utnirarenaka Perrurle

Erlikilyika (c.1865 – c.1930), known to Europeans by the name Jim Kite or Jim Kyte or Jim Kite Penangke, was an Aboriginal Australian sculptor, artist and anthropological interpreter. He was an Arrernte man, born into the Southern Arrernte or Pertame language group in Central Australia. He was the first Central Australian artist to be nationally recognised for his artistic talent, in particular his carvings of animals in soft stone, illustrations and sculptures, after an exhibition of his work was held in Adelaide, South Australia in 1913.

== Life ==
=== Early life ===
Although it is not known for certain, Erlikilyika was probably born close to his ancestral home of Akeltye (or Okilcha), later known as McKenzie's Waterhole, on the Coglin Creek, around 1860–1865, soon after the arrival of the first European explorer, John McDouall Stuart in 1860. He was a southern Arrernte man, whose home language was Pertame, also known as Southern Arrernte. McKenzie's Waterhole was about six miles (9.7 kilometres) east of Charlotte Waters, a tiny settlement clustered around a telegraph station which was part of the Australian Overland Telegraph Line. As a young boy Erlikilyika worked at the telegraph station, and lived there for most of his life. He also worked up and down the line, learning English and Kaytetye (or Kaytej), and was part of the first generation to grow up during a period of great change in the region.

=== Artist and anthropologist ===
His career as an artist started with carving things like local animals and pipe stems from white soapstone (steatite) and selling these carvings to passing travellers. He used simple tools in all of his carving work: penknife, wire and a shearing blade.

Erlikilyika met Frank Gillen in 1875, and subsequently travelled with him and Walter Baldwin Spencer on their 1901–1902 cross-continental anthropological expedition, acting as guide, interpreter (as the sole speaker of Kaytetye on the expedition) and virtual research assistant. He was recommended for this role by the Charlotte Waters Telegraph Station station master PM Byrne, who told them he was a “first class black boy”; this was despite the fact that Erlikilyika was in his 30s at this time.

Erlikilyika showed remarkable artistic talent, he made numerous sketches on the trip, and also sculpted items from wood and kaolinite. Museum anthropologist Jason Gibson notes that he "sculpted and decorated objects of wood and kaolin meerschaum clay". He made his own symbolic notes to assist Spencer in his recording of a "Dreaming-story", and also made a number of unusual illustrations in one of Gillen's notebooks. They were also accompanied by another Arrernte man, Parunda, known as Warwick. Gillen gave Erlikilyika a book to draw in, in which the artist created 27 elaborate drawings detailing his daily life and culture of their camp – action sequences, representations of a woman and a stockman, portraits of Spencer and Parunda – but Gillen retained the book before eventually giving it to his sons. These drawings are available online.

Gillen recorded a small number of verses of "sacred" songs, associated with ancestral beings. One of these verses was introduced by Spencer as the "relating to the tradition of the Great Snake of Okilcha [Akeltye]", and this verse featured the voice of Erlikilyika. Spencer wrote that the song was the "property" of Jim, "a snake-man named Erli-killi-kurra". The first ethnographic film footage ever taken among Aboriginal people, on 3 April 1901, was of the ceremony associated with this verse.

Archaeologist John Mulvaney showed that Erlikilyika was not acknowledged for the role he played as a contributor to Spencer and Gillen's noted anthropological work, The Native Tribes of Central Australia.

=== Recognition ===
His carvings were first documented in March 1910, when examples were displayed in Adelaide. In 1913, accompanied by Telegraph Master and enthusiastic supporter Harry O. Kearnan, Erlikilyika travelled to Adelaide, where his art was exhibited at the Selborne Hotel in Pirie Street. It was well-received in the press, with the artist being praised as a "black genius" in one article in The Register. The article goes on to describe some of the carvings in detail – including a marsupial rat, snakes, birds – and intricate paintings on boomerangs. The reporter includes the lively explanations given by the artist when interviewed, opines that the work surely should be acquired by the national collection and cites Erlikilyika's age as 40 (and also mentions that he visited Sydney when he was 15). This was probably the first solo exhibition of an Aboriginal artist in Australia. Most likely during this visit, Erlikilyika made 24 botanical drawings, annotated with both their Arrernte and scientific names, which were acquired by the South Australian Museum.

He was the first Central Australian artist to be nationally recognised for his artistic talent, in particular his carvings of animals in soft stone, illustrations and sculptures. The geologist, anthropologist, medical doctor and politician Herbert Basedow bought many of Erlikilyika's works, which are now in the National Museum of Australia, and also befriended Erlikilyika, who helped him with the interpretation of ceremonies.

=== Later life ===
There is no record of his date of death, the telegraph station at Charlotte Waters having fallen into disuse and the Central Australia Railway having bypassed the location. The last anecdotal evidence of his life was in 1923; the 1926 mention in the Daily Telegraph says he was "old". His date of death has been cited as late as 1945, but when his brother, Jack Kite, was involved in ceremonies in 1935, there is no mention of "Jim".

His wife, Utnirarenaka Perrurle, was from the Arltunga area. There is no record of any children.

== Works in galleries ==
Erlikilyika's works are now valuable collector's items. The South Australian Museum holds the biggest collection of Erlikilyika carvings. Photographs and other items from his work with Gillen and Spencer are in collections held by Museums Victoria, and some of his work is on display at the Old Timer's Traeger Museum in Alice Springs. Of Basedow's collection of works, the sketchbook is held in the South Australian Museum Archives and the remainder are held in the National Museum of Australia. Some of Erlikilyika's work is also held in the Australian Museum in Sydney.

== Name ==
The artist was known to Europeans by the name Jim Kite, Jim Kyte, or Jim Kite Penangke.

According to Ted Strehlow's genealogical record, his Arrernte name is derived from "Alilkilajaka"; meaning "he slipped" or "glided away"; this refers to the actions of a kite spirit ancestor in a local Dreamtime story, according to Strehlow. The name was translated for Strehlow by the Arrernte and Wangkangurru elder Mick McLean, and has also been spelt Alyelkelhayeka. Gillen's 1875 diary lists a man called "Ar-lee'kill-yicca", and Erkiliakirra seems to be another spelling variation. Spencer wrote it in his diary as Erli-killi-kurra, and Jason Gibson noted that he "was of the Penangk [s]ubsection".

The Australian Dictionary of Biography suggests that as erlia signified emu, his totemic name may relate to an emu ritual area near Charlotte Waters at Adnyultultera waterhole.
