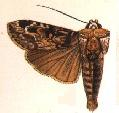

Scientific classification
- Kingdom: Animalia
- Phylum: Arthropoda
- Class: Insecta
- Order: Lepidoptera
- Superfamily: Noctuoidea
- Family: Noctuidae
- Genus: Sasunaga
- Species: S. leucorina

Binomial name
- Sasunaga leucorina (Hampson, 1908)

Synonyms
- Magusa leucorina Hampson, 1908; Magusa olivaria Hampson, 1908

= Sasunaga leucorina =

Species of moth

Sasunaga leucorina is a moth of the family Noctuidae. It is found in Sundaland, Sulawesi, the southern Moluccas, New Guinea and Queensland.
