= Sasunaga =

Scientific classification
- Domain: Eukaryota
- Kingdom: Animalia
- Phylum: Arthropoda
- Class: Insecta
- Order: Lepidoptera
- Superfamily: Noctuoidea
- Family: Noctuidae
- Subfamily: Noctuinae
- Tribe: Dypterygiini
- Genus: Sasunaga; Moore, 1881

Genus of moths

Sasunaga is a genus of moths in the family Noctuidae.

== Species ==
- Sasunaga apiciplaga Warren, 1912
- Sasunaga interrupta Warren, 1912
- Sasunaga leucorina (Hampson, 1908)
- Sasunaga longiplaga Warren, 1912
- Sasunaga oenistis (Hampson, 1908)
- Sasunaga tenebrosa (Moore, 1867)
- Sasunaga tomaniiviensis Robinson, 1975
