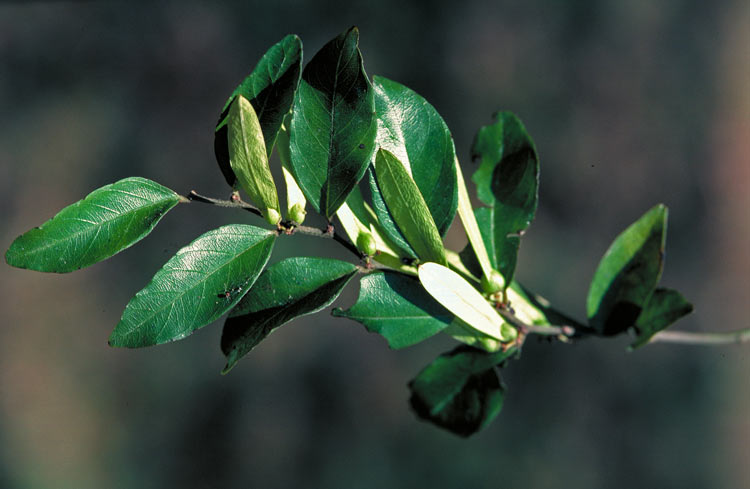
- Branchlet with winged fruit

Conservation status
- Least Concern (NCA)

Scientific classification
- Kingdom: Plantae
- Clade: Tracheophytes
- Clade: Angiosperms
- Clade: Eudicots
- Clade: Rosids
- Order: Rosales
- Family: Rhamnaceae
- Genus: Ventilago
- Species: V. ecorollata

Binomial name
- Ventilago ecorollata (F.Muell.) F.Muell.

Synonyms
- Berchemia ecorollata F.Muell.; Berchemia corollata F.Muell.

= Ventilago ecorollata =

Species of flowering plant

Ventilago ecorollata is a species of plant in the family Rhamnaceae native to eastern Queensland, Australia.

== Description ==
Ventilago ecorollata is a vine with a stem reaching up to 8 cm (3.1 in) diameter. The leaves are simple and arranged alternately on the twigs, and they have small crenulations on the leaf edges. They measure up to 6.5 cm (2.6 in) long and 3 cm (1.2 in) wide, and are held on a very short petiole (leaf stem). Stipules are hairy and about 2 mm (0.08 in) long.

Flowers are borne on racemes that emerge from the leaf axils. The calyx tube, or hypanthium, is about 2 mm (0.08 in) wide and has five lobes, each about 1.5 mm (0.06 in) long. There are no petals. The fruits are samaras with a single wing attached at the apex.

== Taxonomy ==
It was originally described and named by Ferdinand von Mueller in 1875, placing it in the genus Berchemia. The specimen he worked from was collected by John Dallachy from 'Rockingham's Bay' (now Rockingham Bay), but there were no fruits in the collection. In 1880, after examining new material with fruit, Mueller moved the species to the current genus Ventilago.

== Conservation ==
This species is listed as least concern under the Queensland Government's Nature Conservation Act. As of 5 December 2025, it has not been assessed by the International Union for Conservation of Nature (IUCN).

== Gallery ==
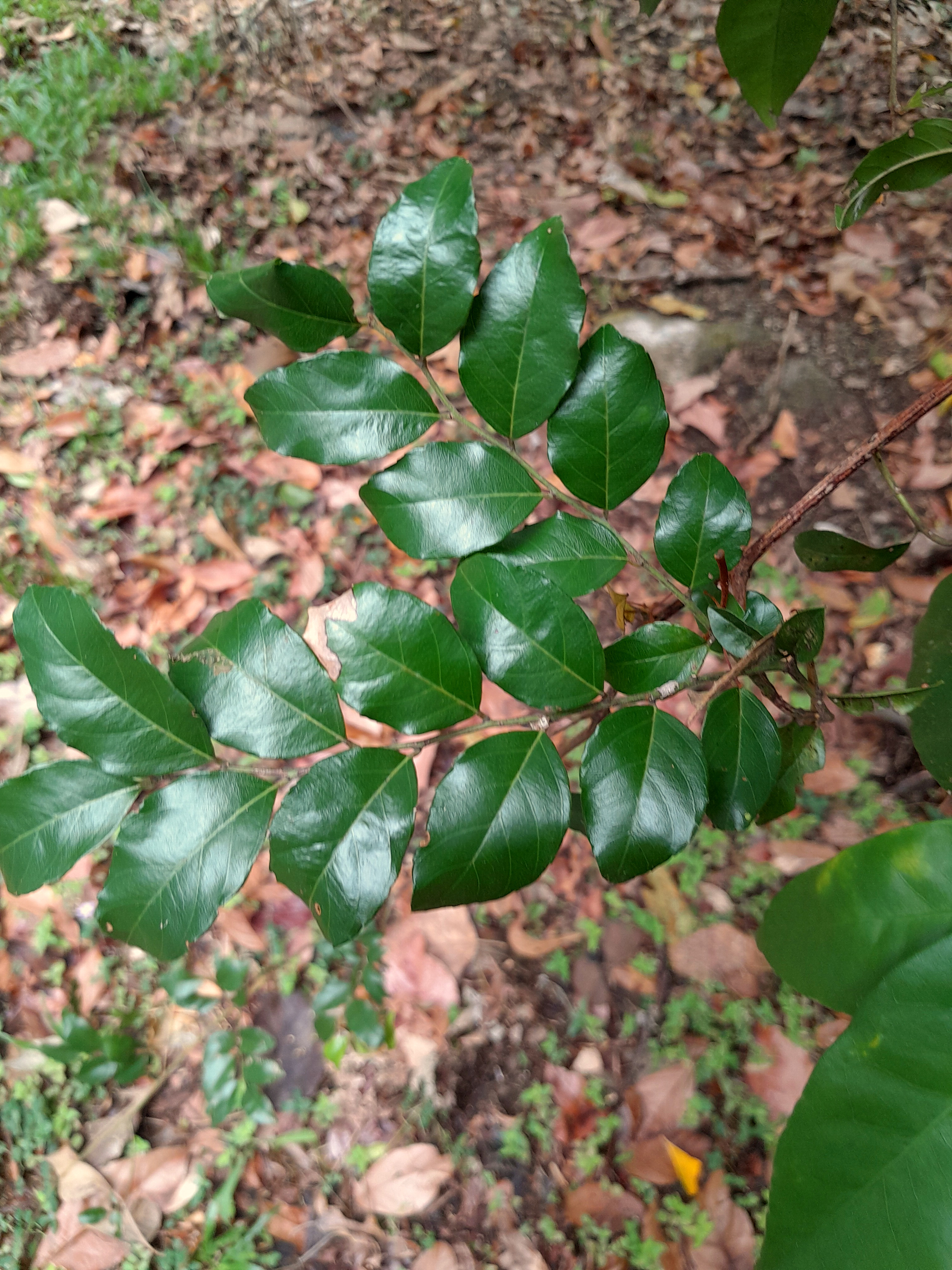
Foliage

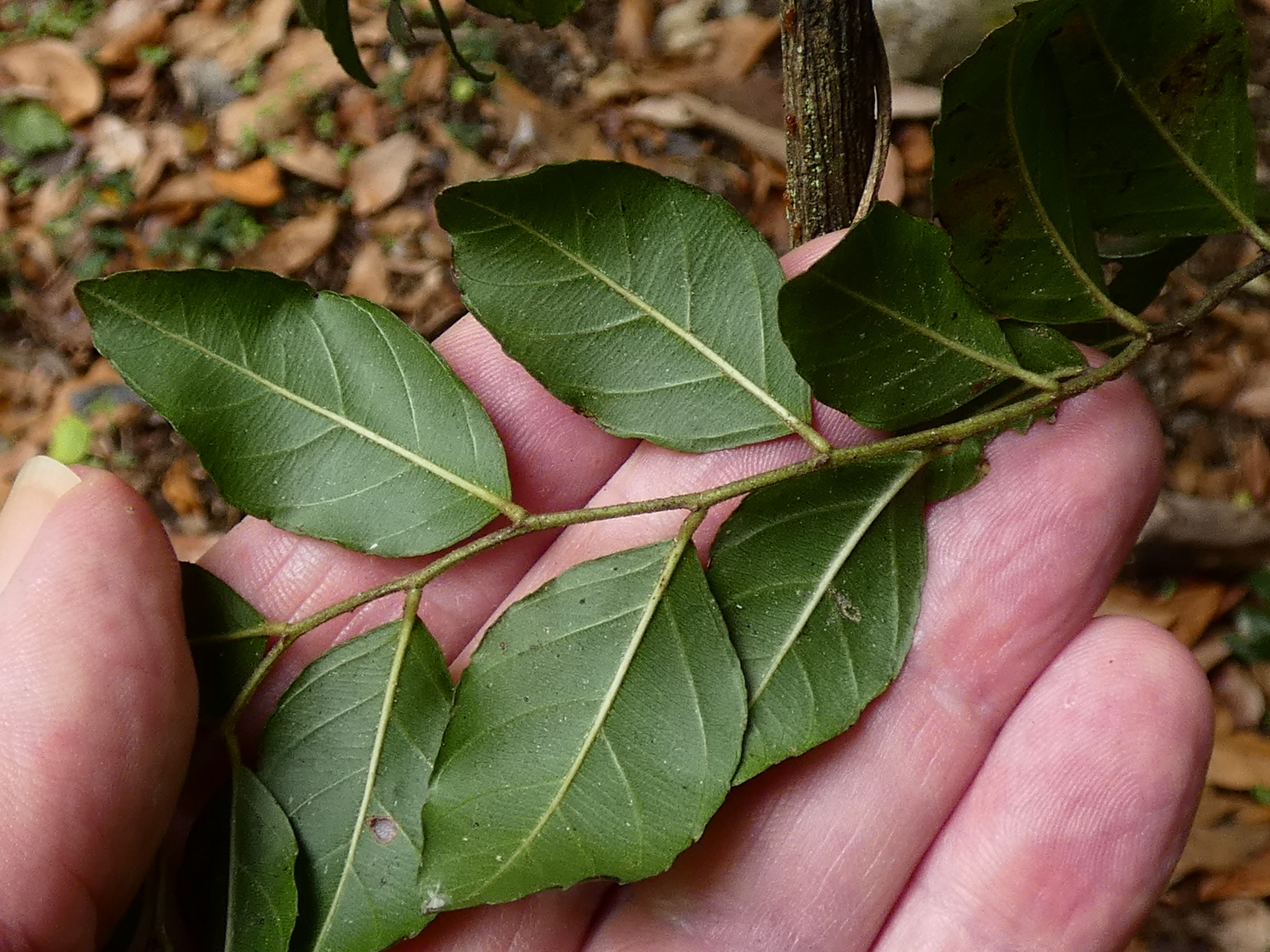
Underside of leaves

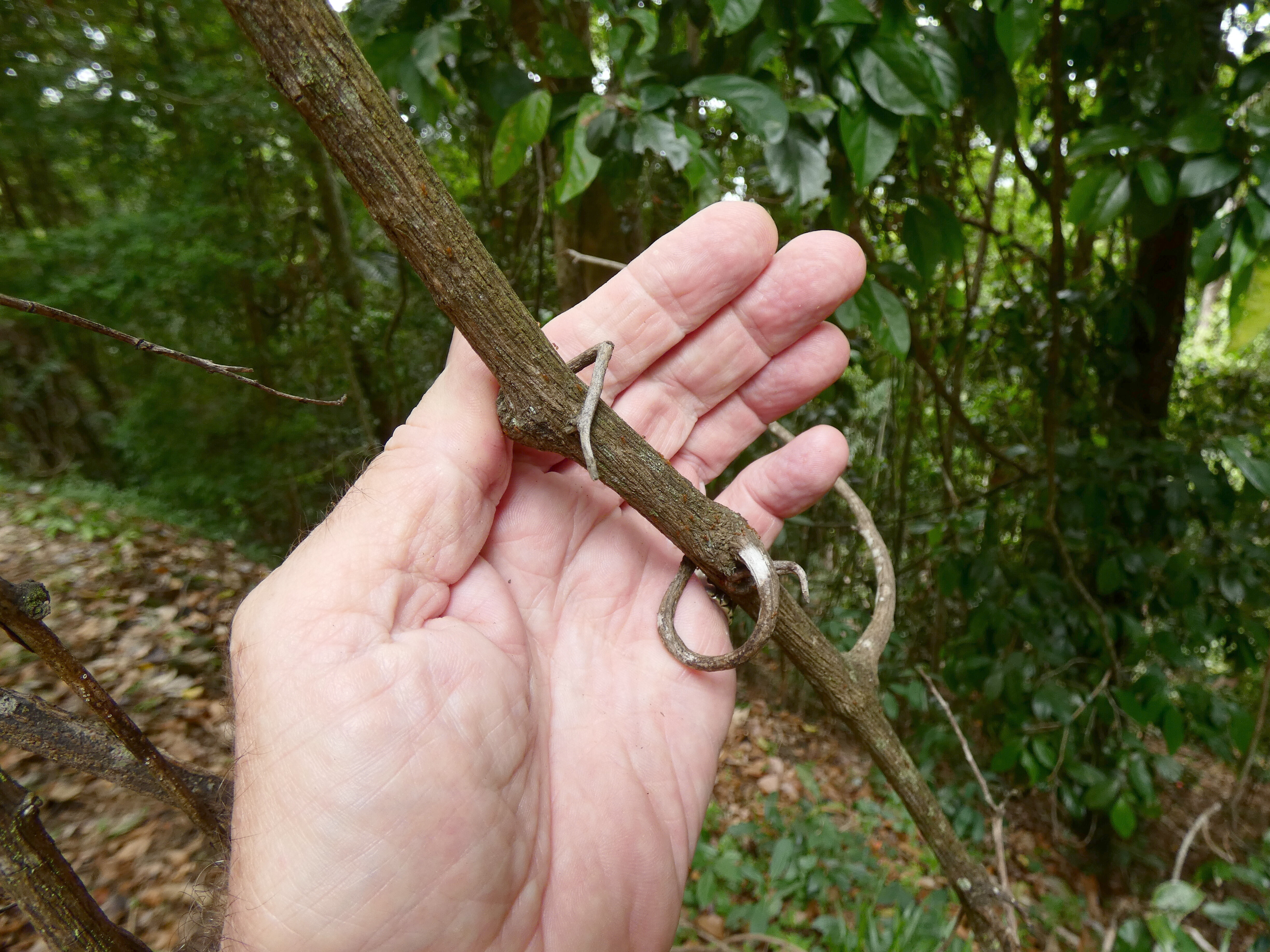
Vine stem and twining branches
