= Arrernte (area) =

Coordinates: 23°42′0″S 133°52′12″E

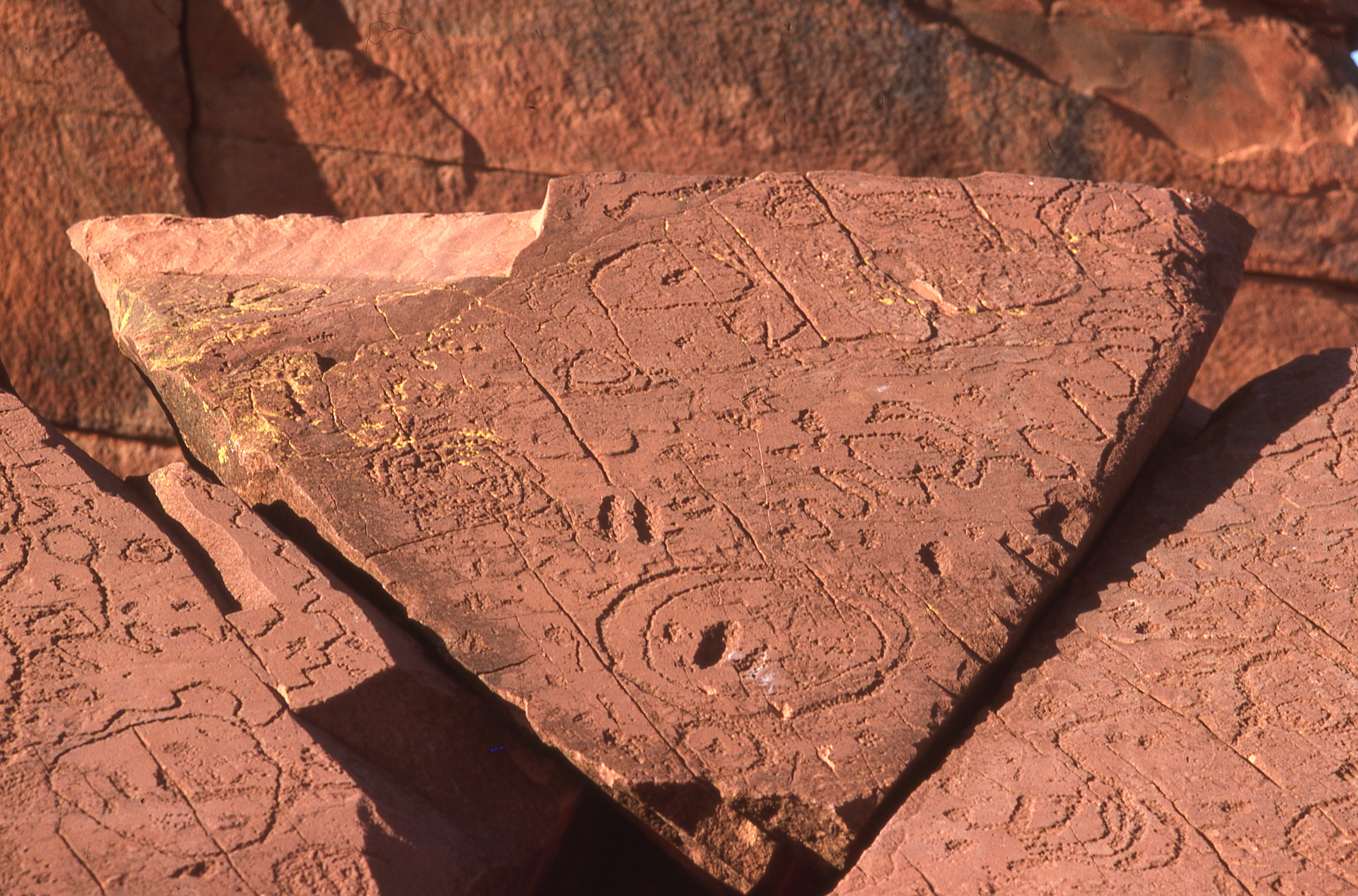
Rock carvings in Ewaninga Rock Carvings Conservation Reserve, part of the Arrernte territory

The Arrernte land is aboriginal land in central Australia. It is controlled by the Arrernte Council which in turn is controlled by Central Land Council from Alice Springs.

== Description ==
Arrernte is the traditional language of Alice Springs, which is the centre of Arrernte land.

Arrernte land claims run as far west as Mutitjulu and King's Canyon, and as far east as the western edge of the Simpson Desert. Arrernte does control a small amount of land north of Alice Springs, there are many communities on this land, including but not limited to Sandy Bore Outstation, Black Tank, Corkwood, Snake Well, Gillen Bore, Burt Creek, 7 Mile, and many more. The recognised Family's include but not limited include: Turner, Ferber, Lynch, Stephens, Gorey, McMillan, Rice, and many others intermarried families.
