= Sasunaga apiciplaga =

Scientific classification
- Domain: Eukaryota
- Kingdom: Animalia
- Phylum: Arthropoda
- Class: Insecta
- Order: Lepidoptera
- Superfamily: Noctuoidea
- Family: Noctuidae
- Genus: Sasunaga
- Species: S. apiciplaga

Binomial name
- Sasunaga apiciplaga Warren, 1912

Species of moth

Sasunaga apiciplaga is a moth of the family Noctuidae. It is found in the Northern Territory and Queensland, as well as Maluku in Indonesia.
