= Brownie Doolan =

Aboriginal tracker (1918–2011)

Brownie Doolan Perrurle (1918 – 2011) was an Aboriginal tracker who was known for being the last person to speak the Lower Arrernte language, the language becoming extinct when he died in 2011. Gavan Breen, an Australian linguist, was able to compile a dictionary of Lower Arrernte comprising about a thousand words by recording talks he had with Doolan.

Doolan's mother Fanny, father Paddy and grandmother, who lived south of Aputula, spoke the language. Doolan was uncertain of his date of birth, but a later search of the old native affairs branch records showed that he was born in 1918.

Doolan was a stockman on the Andado Station in 1945-6 (age shown as 23–25), with wife Edie (Note: It's possible that this is the same woman later called Biddy?) and two children. He later became a police tracker for both Finke and Kulgera police. Doolan and his wife Biddy are recorded in 1960s censuses of Finke, with Brownie recorded as a tracker, of the Purula group of Arrernte/Aranda people, born at New Crown station (not far south-west of Finke). Both sets of parents were deceased by this time. In 1963, young children Peter and Margaret were at home, with Sambo, Michael and Stanley apparently adults and elsewhere; Daisy the child of Biddy and a deceased father. (However, in 1965 Daisy is shown as daughter of Brownie.) Biddy is shown as of the Pananka group of Aranda people in 1965 and 1968, but Loritja in 1963 and 1966. Her birthplace was Hermannsburg (which is Western Arrernte country), and her occupation is shown as school cleaner in 1963. Brownie and Mick (Brownie's son Michael?) Doolan, referred to as the two longest-serving trackers, were also famous for the dogs that they owned.

Doolan retired in about 1981. He later did contract work on the Central Australia Railway that used to pass through Finke. He was regarded as an icon in the town, much loved and respected by many, and the subject of an obituary in the NT Police News journal after his death in 2011, aged 92.
