= Damian Miller (aviator) =

Australian pilot and pastoralist (1915–1990)

Ronald Nevill Damian Miller known almost exclusively as Damian Miller (10 February 1915 - 20 May 1990) was an Australian pilot and pastoralist who spent much of his life in Alice Springs. Miller helped found Connellan Airways as well as Argadargada and Hamilton Downs Stations.

== Early life ==
Miller was born in 1915 in Melbourne, Victoria, the son of Septimus and Helen Miller and he attended Xavier College as a young man where he became friends with Sam Calder whom he would remain friends with for the rest of his life. After he left college he made friends with Edward Connellan, another man who would become a huge part of his life and he introduced him to Calder.

When World War II broke out Miller and Calder immediately volunteered for the RAAF but first flew to Alice Springs to help Connellan establish Connellan Airways; which Miller helped finance (on a secured loan basis), with the assistance of his wealthy grandfather Henry Miller. Miller, with the other staff, helped build the Connellan hangar and construct the airstrips and flight paths.

== World War II ==
Miller was called up early in the war, initially as a pilot instructor and then as a pilot on a Catalina squadron based in the Top End. In this squadron Miller once flew 11 hours of an 18 hour flight on only one engine after the aircraft had been severely damaged by Japanese air-aircraft fire at Kavieng, Papua New Guinea. The navigational instruments had also being damaged and the crew had to jettison fuel and ammunition as they flew over enemy territory through heavy rain. For this event Miller was awarded a Distinguished Flying Cross for 'bravery in combat'.

== Life in the Northern Territory ==
Post-war Miller moved to Alice Springs to work again with Connellan, where he flew the Wyndham mail runs.

In 1947, on a trip to England to purchase two Rapide aircraft's, Miller met and married Anne Fletcher at Yeovil in Somerset and following their marriage the two flew the planes home. This was a difficult trip as fuel had to be left a aerodromes 88 km (55 mi) apart across Europe and Asia and the planes had no radios. They reached Alice Springs on 6 May 1948.

In 1951 Miller, alongside Milton Willick, established Argadargada Station 400 km (250 mi) north east of Alice Springs. They had a difficult time with the property, losing 1,300 head of cattle in 1953-54 to gidgee poisoning. In 1954 Calder joined the partnership and became the manager before they sold the station in 1964. Miller also bought a share of Hamilton Downs Station in 1952 and built a new homestead, he eventually acquired sole ownership in 1968. In 1972 Miller donated the ruins and site of the old Hamilton Downs homestead to the Apex Club of Central Australia, who turned it in to Hamilton Downs Youth Camp, which officially opened on 11 March 1978.

Miller died after a long illness in 1990 and is buried at the Alice Springs Garden Cemetery. He was survived by his wife and their four children; Helen, Andrew, Jacinta and Paul.

== Legacy ==
The Central Australian Aviation Museum has a Damian Miller Room.

Miller Road in Alice Springs is named for Miller.
