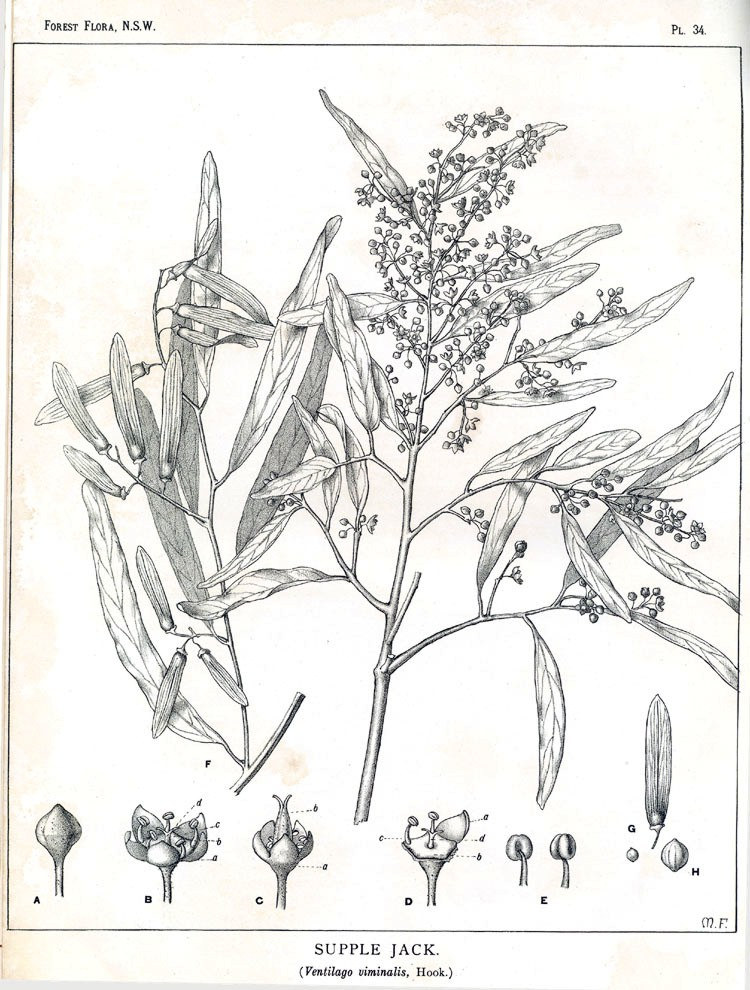
- Ventilago viminalis

Scientific classification
- Kingdom: Plantae
- Clade: Tracheophytes
- Clade: Angiosperms
- Clade: Eudicots
- Clade: Rosids
- Order: Rosales
- Family: Rhamnaceae
- Tribe: Ventilagineae
- Genus: Ventilago; Gaertn.

Species
- See text

Synonyms
- Apteron Kurz; Enrila Blanco; Kurzinda Kuntze

= Ventilago =

Genus of flowering plants

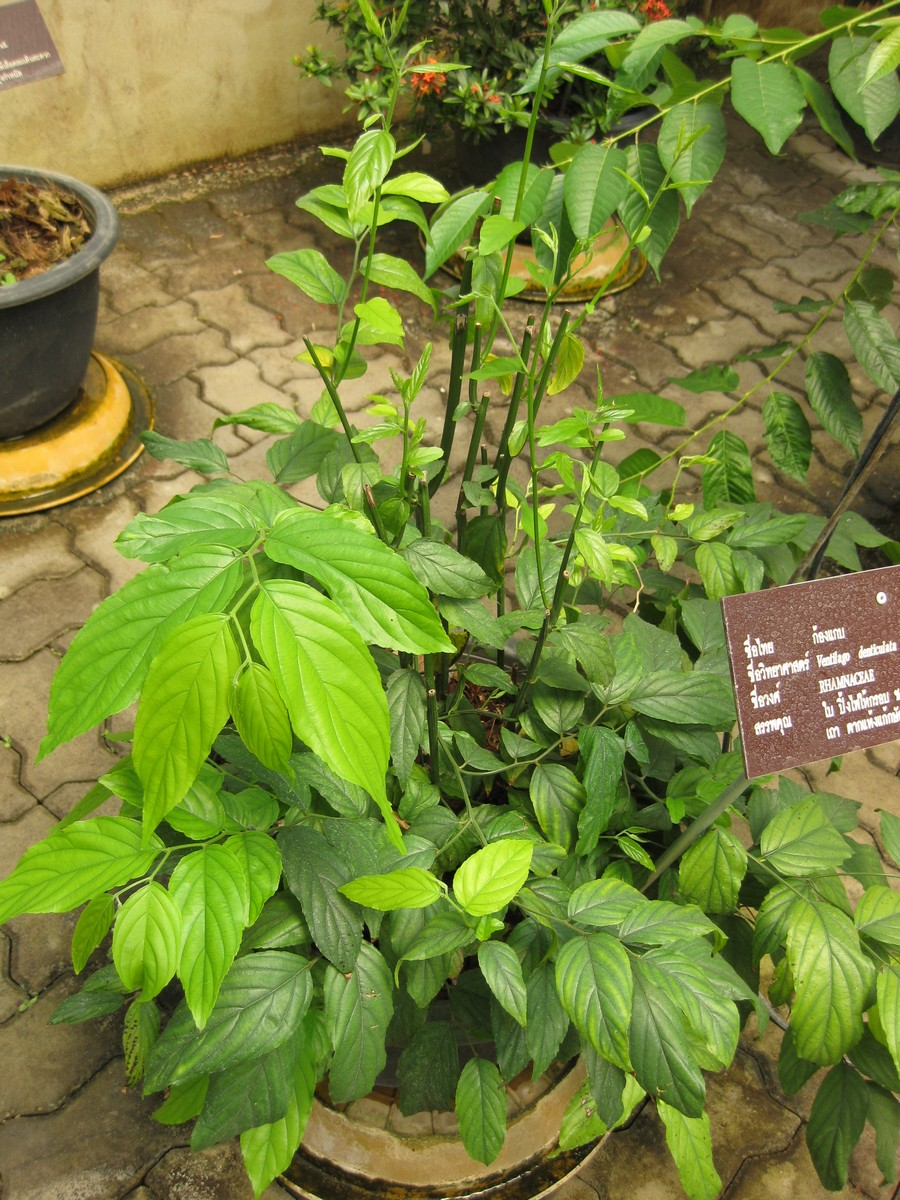
Ventilago denticulata

Ventilago is a genus of plants in the family Rhamnaceae. It includes about 40 species found in the tropics of South and SE Asia, Australasia, with one species each in Africa and Madagascar.

Plants in this genus are evergreen vines, scandent shrubs, or (rarely) small trees. Inflorescences emerge from the leaf axils and may consist of solitary flowers or glomerules. Petals are absent in some species, e.g. Ventilago ecorollata. The fruit is a single-seeded samara with a wing attached at the apex.

The roots of Ventilago vanuatuana—included in Ventilago neocaledonica before 2020—are used in Vanuatu to produce a crimson red dye (Apma: laba) which is used to pattern traditional textiles.

== Species ==
As of December 2025, Plants of the World Online accepts the following 40 species:

- Ventilago africana Exell
- Ventilago borneensis Ridl.
- Ventilago brunnea Merr.
- Ventilago buxoides Baill.
- Ventilago crenata Cahen & Utteridge
- Ventilago cristata Pierre
- Ventilago denticulata Willd.
- Ventilago dichotoma (Blanco) Merr.
- Ventilago diffusa (G.Don) Exell
- Ventilago ecorollata (F.Muell.) F.Muell.
- Ventilago elegans Hemsl.
- Ventilago ferruginea Cahen & Utteridge
- Ventilago flavovirens Cahen & Utteridge
- Ventilago gamblei Suess.
- Ventilago gladiata Pierre
- Ventilago goughii Gamble
- Ventilago harmandiana Pierre
- Ventilago inaequilateralis Merr. & Chun
- Ventilago kurzii Ridl.
- Ventilago lanceolata Merr.
- Ventilago leiocarpa Benth.
- Ventilago leptadenia Tul.
- Ventilago lucens Miq.
- Ventilago madraspatana Gaertn.
- Ventilago maingayi M.A.Lawson
- Ventilago malaccensis Ridl.
- Ventilago microcarpa K.Schum.
- Ventilago multinervia Merr.
- Ventilago neocaledonica Schltr.
- Ventilago nisidai Kaneh.
- Ventilago palawanensis Elmer
- Ventilago pauciflora Pit.
- Ventilago pseudocalyculata Guillaumin
- Ventilago pubiflora W.D.Francis
- Ventilago sororia Hance
- Ventilago tinctoria Cahen, Toussirot & Pillon
- Ventilago vanuatuana Cahen, Toussirot & Pillon
- Ventilago viminalis Hook.
- Ventilago vitiensis A.Gray
- Ventilago zhengdei G.S.Fan
