= Lower Arrernte language =

Extinct Australian Aboriginal language

Lower Arrernte
- Lower Aranda, Lower Southern Arrernte
- Alenjerntarrpe
- Native to: Australia
- Region: South-Eastern Northern Territory, northern South Australia
- Extinct: 2011, with the death of Brownie Doolan
- Revival: by 2020
- Language family: Pama–Nyungan: Arandic; Aranda; Lower Arrernte

Language codes
- ISO 639-3: axl
- Glottolog: lowe1436
- AIATSIS: C29
- ELP: Lower Southern Aranda

Lower Arrernte, also known as Lower Southern Arrernte, Lower Aranda, Lower Southern Aranda and Alenjerntarrpe, is an extinct Arandic language (but not of the Arrernte language group). Lower Arrernte was spoken in the Finke River area, near the Overland Telegraph Line station at Charlotte Waters, just north of the border between South Australia and the Northern Territory, and in the Dalhousie area in S.A. It had been extinct since the last speaker died in 2011, but there is now a language revival project under way.

== Extinction ==
By 2007 only one person was known to speak it fluently enough to hold a conversation: Brownie Doolan Perrurle (1918–2011), known as Brownie Doolan. Gavan Breen, an Australian linguist, was able to compile a dictionary of Lower Arrernte comprising about a thousand words by recording talks he had with Doolan.

== Language revival ==
As of 2020, Lower Southern Arrernte is one of 20 languages prioritised as part of the Priority Languages Support Project, being undertaken by First Languages Australia and funded by the Department of Communications and the Arts. The project aims to "identify and document critically-endangered languages — those languages for which little or no documentation exists, where no recordings have previously been made, but where there are living speakers".
