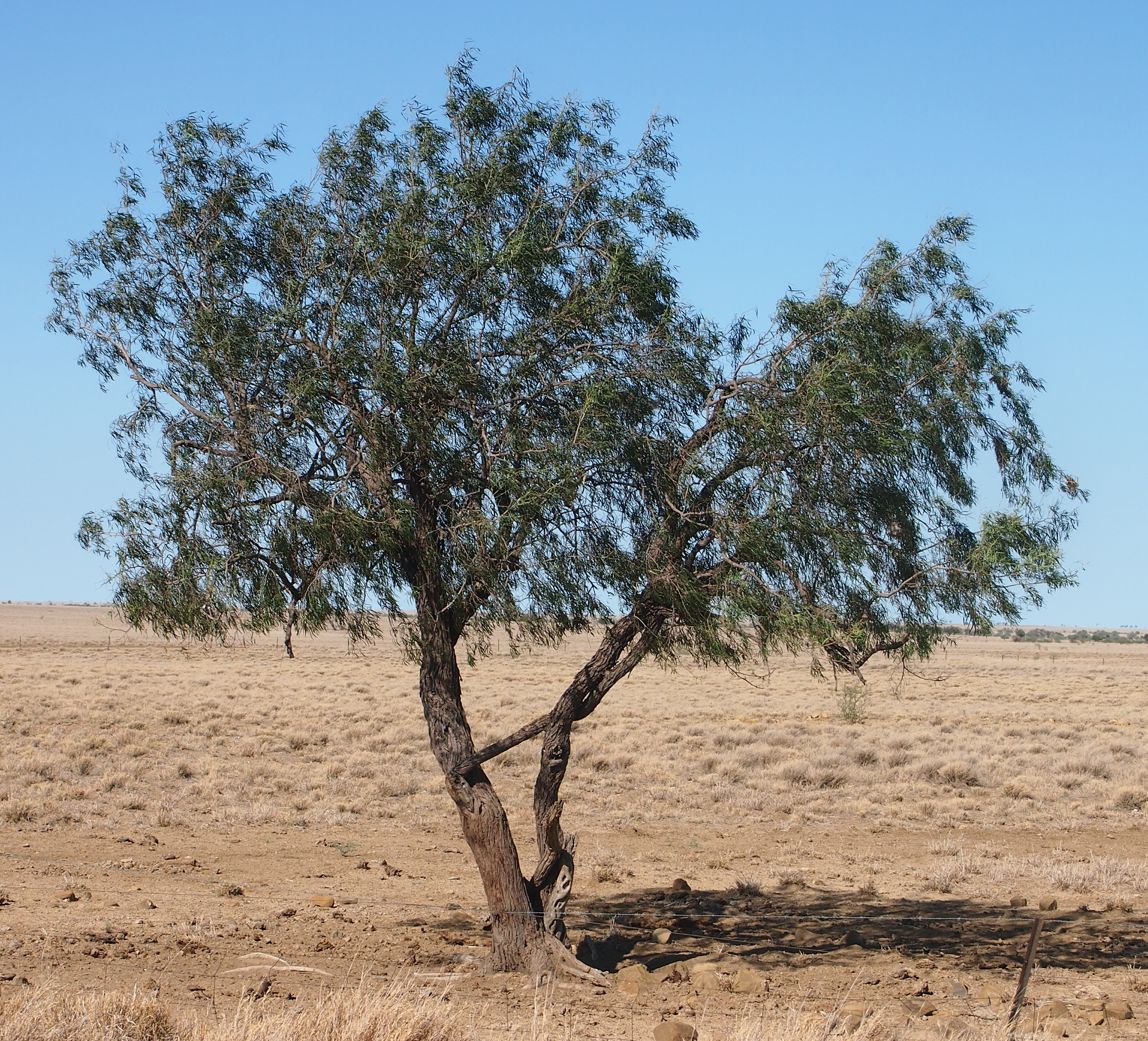

Conservation status
- Least Concern (IUCN 3.1)

Scientific classification
- Kingdom: Plantae
- Clade: Tracheophytes
- Clade: Angiosperms
- Clade: Eudicots
- Clade: Rosids
- Order: Rosales
- Family: Rhamnaceae
- Genus: Ventilago
- Species: V. viminalis

Binomial name
- Ventilago viminalis Hook.

= Ventilago viminalis =

Supplejack

Species of tree

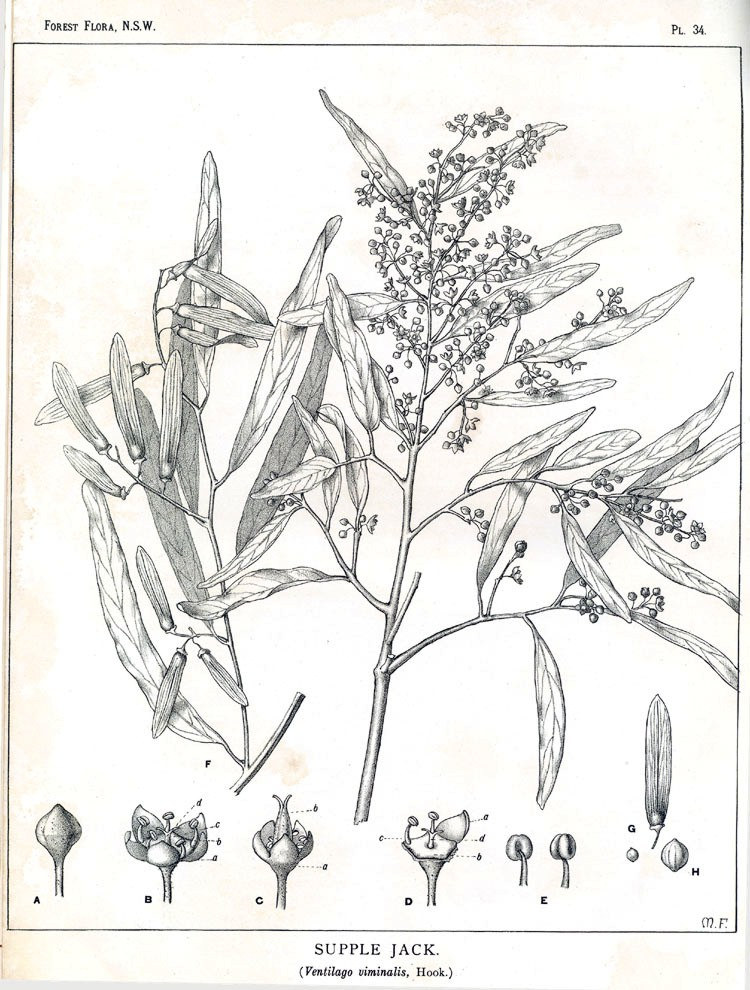
Ventilago viminalis (Margaret Flockton)

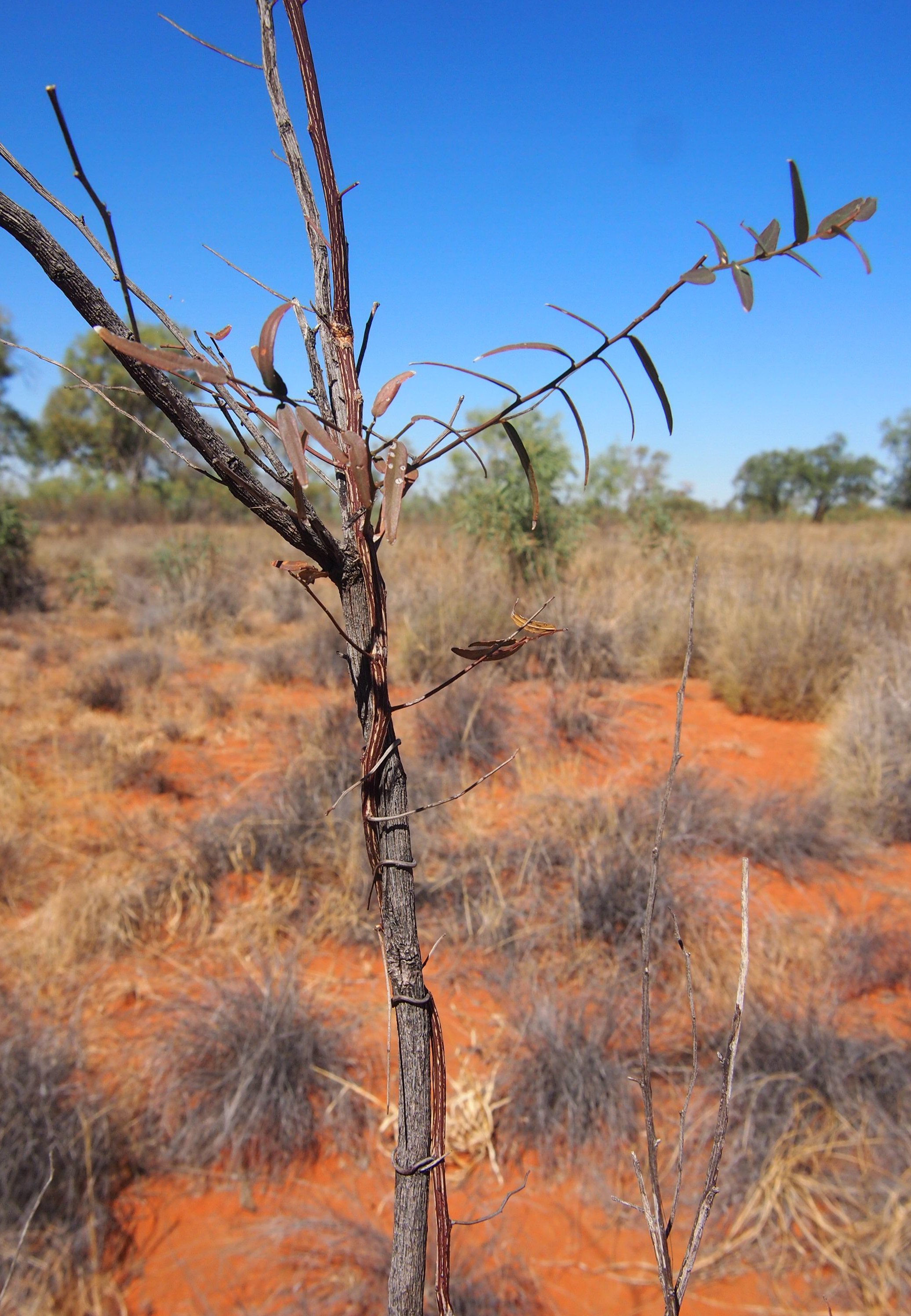
Ventilago viminalis seedling in vine phase of life cycle.

Ventilago viminalis, commonly known as supplejack, vine tree or whip vine, is a tree native to Northern and Central Australia from coastal regions of Queensland to the Northern Territory and Western Australia (with occurrences in New South Wales and South Australia).

== Description ==
The plant begins life as a scrambler, using other trees, shrubs and even grasses for support. As it ages the stem becomes increasingly woody and the plant eventually develops a growth form more typical of a tree. The tree can reach 7 metres in height and often has several trunks with pendulous branch extremities. The bark is dark and fissured. The leaves have petioles and are green and lanceolate. The flowers are small and greenish yellow. Flowering season varies depending on rainfall. The fruits are indehiscent and have a single prominent longitudinal wing.

== Taxonomy ==
It was first described by William Jackson Hooker in 1848. The species epithet, viminalis, is a Latin adjective describing the plant as having long flexible shoots suitable for basket work. It is a member of the Rhamnaceae family.

== Australian aboriginal uses and names ==
Aboriginal Australians eat the gum from this tree. They scrape it off as it comes through, twisting it onto a stick. It can be chewed like chewing gum. The supplejack in Arrernte is called Atnyerampwe, and the gum is Ngwarle atnyerampwe. In the Kimberley Ventilago viminalis is commonly called the 'medicine tree'. Local people cut chunks out of the bark or roots to boil up and make an infusion to treat a variety of skin ailments as well as bruises and rheumatism. Trees with large telltale oval or oblong scars in the bark are often found in the local bush.

The Walmajarri people of Paruku Indigenous Protected Area call this tree Walakarri,
