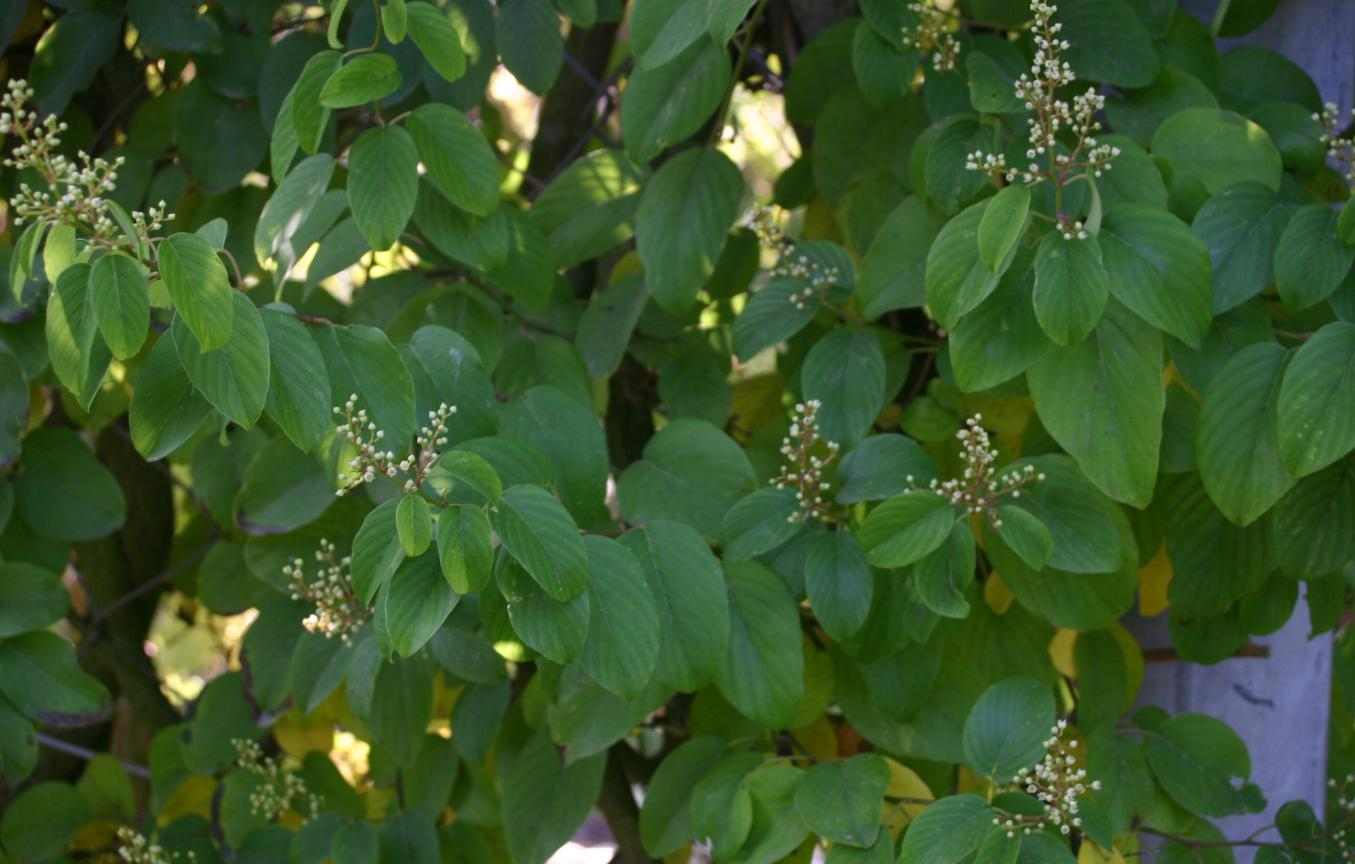
- Berchemia racemosa, foliage and inflorescences

Scientific classification
- Kingdom: Plantae
- Clade: Tracheophytes
- Clade: Angiosperms
- Clade: Eudicots
- Clade: Rosids
- Order: Rosales
- Family: Rhamnaceae
- Genus: Berchemia
- Species: B. racemosa

Binomial name
- Berchemia racemosa Siebold & Zucc.

= Berchemia racemosa =

Species of flowering plant

Berchemia racemosa, commonly known as paniculous supplejack, is a shrub in the genus Berchemia.

== Forms and varieties ==
- Berchemia racemosa f. pilosa Hatusima
- Berchemia racemosa f. stenosperma Hatusima
- Berchemia racemosa var. luxurians Hatusima
- Berchemia racemosa var. magna Makino
