= Kaytetye language =

Australian Aboriginal language

Kaytetye
- Kaititj, Gaididj, Kaiditj, Kaytej
- Native to: Australia
- Region: central Northern Territory
- Ethnicity: Kaytetye people
- Native speakers: 109 (2021 census)
- Language family: Pama–Nyungan: Arandic; Kaytetye
- Signed forms: Akitiri Sign Language

Language codes
- ISO 639-3: gbb
- Glottolog: kayt1238
- AIATSIS: C13
- ELP: Kaytetye
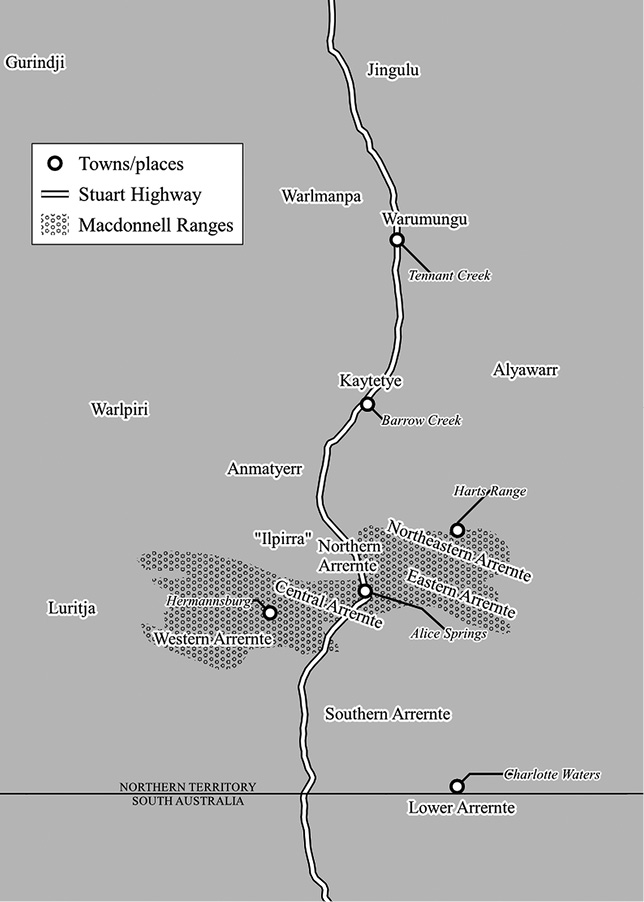
- Map showing languages in Central Australia

Kaytetye (also spelt Kaititj, Gaididj, Kaiditj, Kaytej) is an Australian Aboriginal language primarily spoken in the Northern Territory north of Alice Springs by the Kaytetye people, who live around Barrow Creek and Tennant Creek. It belongs to the Arandic subgroup of the Pama-Nyungan languages and is related to Alyawarra, which is one of the Upper Arrernte dialects. It has an unusual phonology and there are no known dialects.

The language is considered to be threatened; it is used for face-to-face communication within all generations, but it is losing users, with only 109 speakers of the language in the 2021 census.

The Kaytetye also have a well-developed sign language known as Akitiri or Eltye eltyarrenke.

== Phonology ==
Kaytetye is phonologically unusual in a number of ways. Words start with vowels and end with schwa; full CV(C) syllables only occur within a word, as in the word arrkwentyarte 'three' (schwa is spelled ⟨e⟩, unless initial, in which case it is not written and often not pronounced). Stress falls on the first full syllable. There are only two productive vowels, but numerous consonants, including pre-stopped and pre-palatalized consonants.

=== Consonants ===
Consonants occur plain and labialized.

		Peripheral		Coronal				
		Peripheral		Laminal		Apical		
		Bilabial	Velar	Palatal	Dental	Prepalatalized	Alveolar	Retroflex
Plosive		p pʷ	k kʷ	c cʷ	t̪ t̪ʷ	ʲt ʲtʷ	t tʷ	ʈ ʈʷ
Nasal	plain	m mʷ	ŋ ŋʷ	ɲ ɲʷ	n̪ n̪ʷ	ʲn ʲnʷ	n nʷ	ɳ ɳʷ
Nasal	prestopped	ᵖm ᵖmʷ	ᵏŋ ᵏŋʷ	ᶜɲ ᶜɲʷ	ᵗn̪ ᵗn̪ʷ	ʲᵗn ʲᵗnʷ	ᵗn ᵗnʷ	ᵗɳ ᵗɳʷ
Lateral				ʎ ʎʷ	l̪ l̪ʷ	ʲl ʲlʷ	l lʷ	ɭ ɭʷ
Approximant			ɰ w	j jʷ				ɻ ɻʷ
Tap							ɾ ɾʷ	

[w] is phonemically /ɰʷ/. In the orthography, /ɰ/ is written ⟨h⟩.

=== Vowels ===
	Front	Central	Back
High	i	ɨ ~ ə	(u)
Mid		ɨ ~ ə	
Low		a	

/u/ is marginal.

Two-vowel systems are unusual, but occur in closely related Arrernte as well as in some Northwest Caucasian languages. It seems that the vowel system derives from an earlier one with the typical Australian /i a u/, but that *u lost its roundedness to neighboring consonants, resulting in the labialized series of consonants, while *i lost its frontness (palatal-ness) to other consonants as well, resulting in some cases in the prepalatalized series.

== Grammar ==
Kin terms are obligatorily possessed, though with grammatically singular pronouns. There is a dyadic suffix as well:

Kaytetye kin inflections
	Elder brother	Mother
1	alkere-ye my/our brother	arrwengke my/our mother
2	ngk-alkere your brother	ngk-arrwengke your mother
3	kw-alkere his/her/their brother	kw-arrwengke his/her/their mother
dyadic	alkere-nhenge elder and younger brother	arrwengke-nhenge mother and child

Dual and plural pronouns distinguish clusivity as well as moiety (or 'section') and generation. That is, for a male speaker, different pronouns are used for I and my sibling, grandparent, grandchild (even generation, same moiety), I and my father, I and my brother's child (odd generation, same moiety), and I and my mother, spouse, sister's child (opposite moiety). This results in twelve pronouns for 'we':

Kaytetye pronouns for 'we'
Number	Clusivity	Even generation (same moiety)	Odd generation (same moiety)	Opposite moiety
Dual	inclusive	ayleme	aylake	aylanthe
Dual	exclusive	aylene	aylenake	aylenanthe
Plural	inclusive	aynangke	aynake	aynanthe
Plural	exclusive	aynenangke	aynenake	aynenanthe

That is, root ay-, dual suffix -la or plural -na, exclusive infix ⟨en⟩, an irregular nasal for even generation, and a suffix for same moiety -ke or opposite moiety -nthe.

Verbs include incorporated former verbs of motion that indicate direction and relative timing of someone, usually the subject of the verb. There are differences depending on whether the verb is transitive or intransitive:

Kaytetye 'associated motion' stems
Time	angke 'talk'	Gloss	kwathe 'drink'	Gloss
Prior motion (go/come and X)	angke-ye-ne-	'talk after going'	kwathe-ye-ne-	'drink after going'
Prior motion (go/come and X)	angke-ye-tnye-	'talk after coming'	kwathe-ye-tnye-	'drink after coming'
Prior motion (go/come and X)	angke-ya-lpe-	'talk after returning'	kwathe-ya-lpe-	'drink after returning'
Prior motion (go/come and X)	angke-ya-yte-	'talk after someone arrives'	kwathe-ya-yte-	'drink after someone arrives'
Subsequent motion (X and go/come)	angke-rra-yte-	'talk before leaving'	kwathe-la-yte-	'drink before leaving'
Subsequent motion (X and go/come)	angke-rra-lpe-	'talk before returning'	kwathe-la-lpe-	'drink before returning'
Concurrent motion (X while going/coming)	angke-yerna-lpe-	'talk while coming'	kwathe-yerna-lpe-	'drink while coming'
Concurrent motion (X while going/coming)	angke-rra-pe-	'talk while going along'	kwathe-rra-pe-yne-	'drink while going along'
Concurrent motion (X while going/coming)	angke-rra-ngke-rre-nye-	'talk continuously while going along'	kwathe-la-the-la-rre-	'drink continuously while going along'
Concurrent motion (X while going/coming)	angke-lpa-ngke-	'talk once when on the way'	kwathe-lpa-the-	'drink once when on the way'
Prior and subsequent	angke-nya-yne-	'go and talk and come back'	kwathe-nya-yne-	'go and drink and come back'

== People ==
- Erlikilyika (Jim Kite) learnt to speak Kaytetye when working on the Overland Telegraph Line, and worked as an interpreter for anthropologists and explorers Spencer and Gillen.
