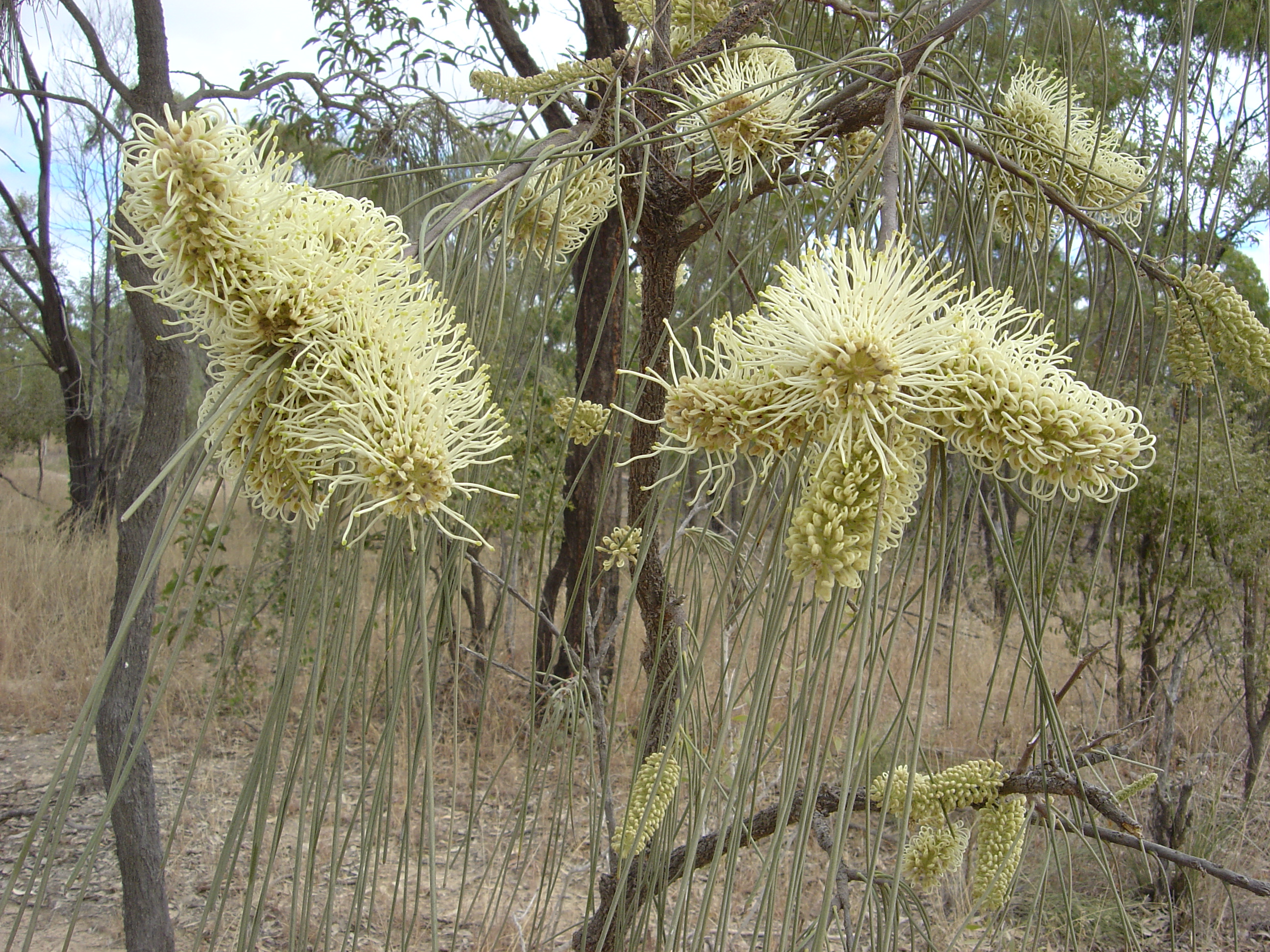
- Foliage and flowers

Scientific classification
- Kingdom: Plantae
- Clade: Tracheophytes
- Clade: Angiosperms
- Clade: Eudicots
- Order: Proteales
- Family: Proteaceae
- Genus: Hakea
- Species: H. chordophylla

Binomial name
- Hakea chordophylla F.Muell.
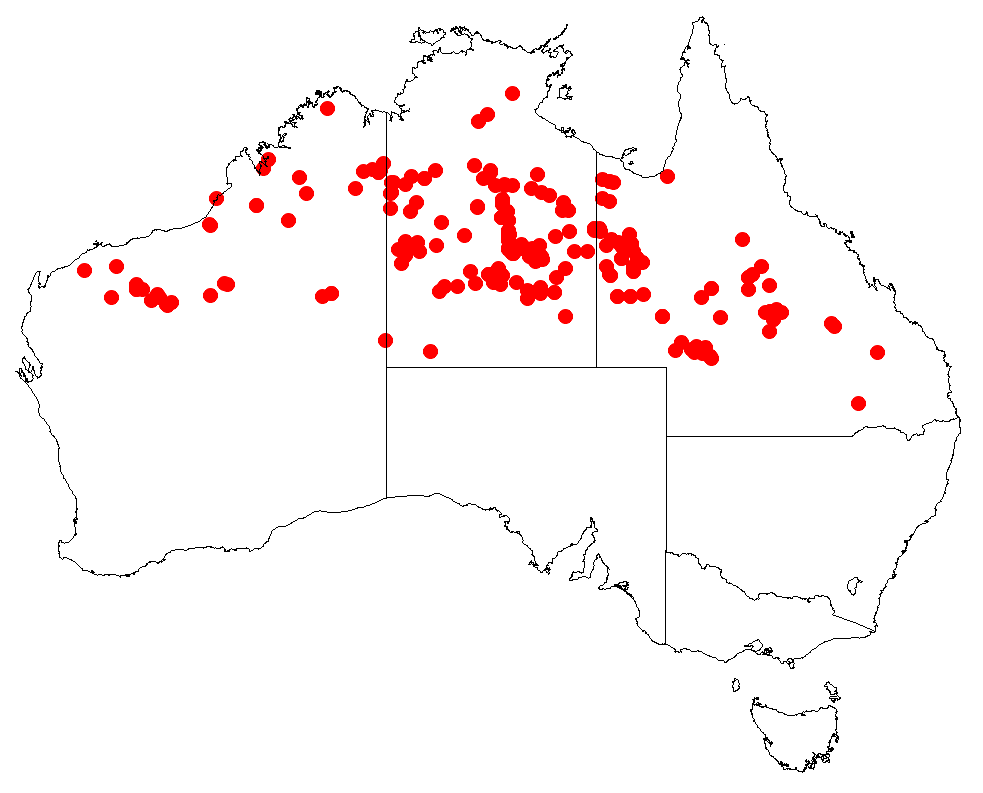
- Occurrence data from Australasian Virtual Herbarium

= Hakea chordophylla =

Species of shrub from central and northern Australia

Hakea chordophylla, commonly known as bootlace oak, bootlace tree, corkwood, or bull oak, is a species of shrub or small tree in the family Proteaceae found in central and northern Australia. Bears very showy golden yellow, pale green or cream nectar rich flowers in winter.

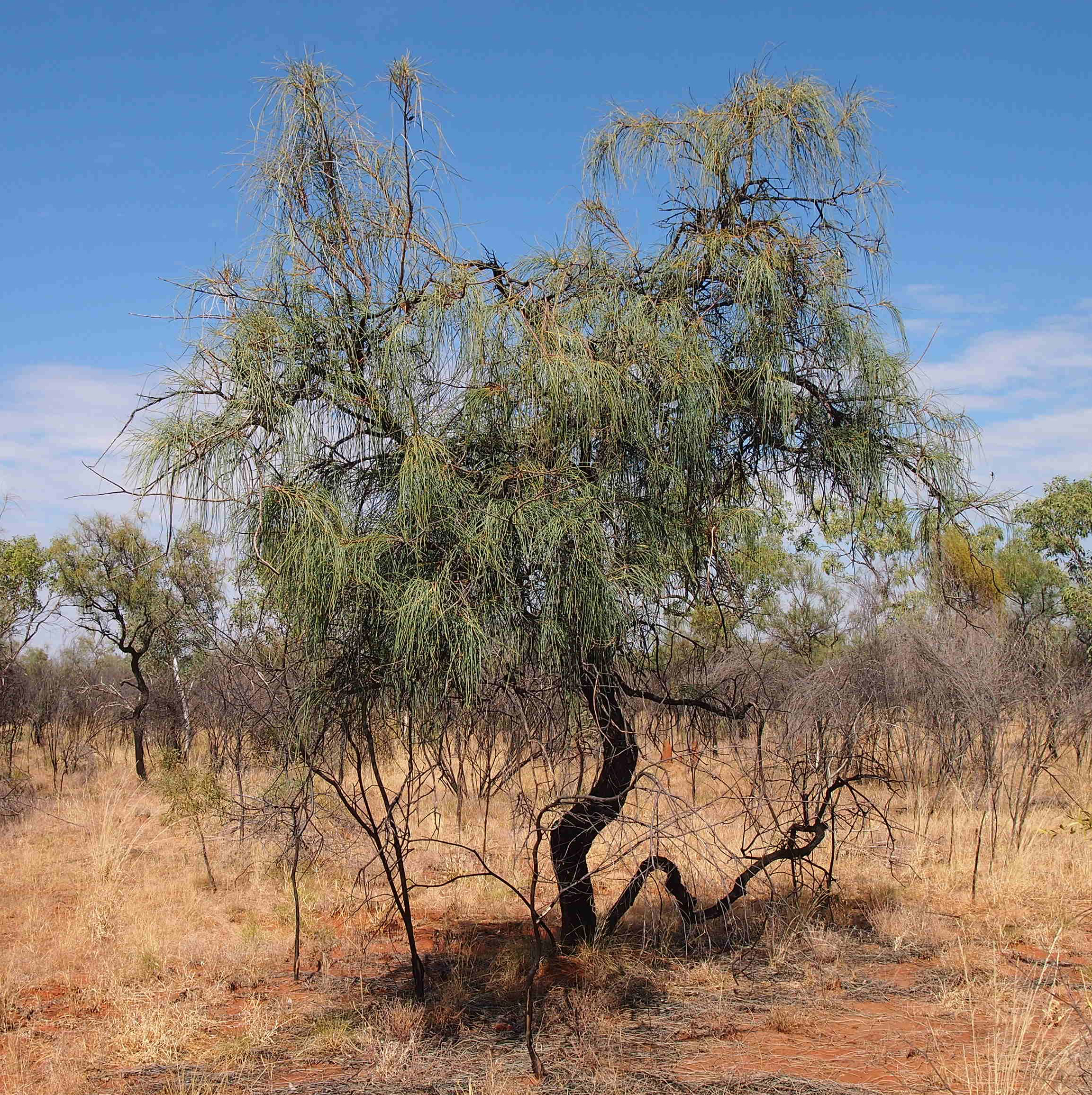
Habit

== Description ==
Hakea chordophylla is a lignotuberous gnarled shrub or small tree 2 to 6 metres (7 to 20 ft) high with an open habit and slightly hanging branches. The trunk has thick corklike bark with many furrows and often contorted smaller branches. The long needle-like leaves are tough and thick from 22 to 42 cm (9–16 in) long and 1.6 to 2.9 mm wide. The inflorescence has from 35 to 70 individual small flowers in racemes 7–13 cm (3–5 in) long in various shades of yellow to green. The racemes are held on a smooth short stem 70–130 mm (3–5 in) long and usually bluish-green with a powdery film. On occasion with dense upright or sparse hairs. The pedicel is 5–12 mm (0.2–0.5 in) long. The cream, green-yellow to bright yellow perianth is 6–9 mm (0.2–0.4 in) long and recurved in bud. The style may be straight or curved and 21–29 mm (0.8–1 in) long. Large smooth fruit are oblong to egg shaped, 2.6–4 cm (1–1.6 in) long and 13–20 mm (0.5–0.8 in) wide tapering to a long obscure to prominent curving beak 1/3–1/2 length of fruit. Flowers from June to August.

== Taxonomy and naming ==
The species was first formally described by Victorian Government Botanist Ferdinand von Mueller in 1857, from plant material collected at Sturt Creek in the Northern Territory. The description was published in Hooker's Journal of Botany and Kew Garden Miscellany. Its specific epithet (chordophylla) is derived from Ancient Greek chorde meaning "gut", "string of a musical instrument", "twine" or "rope" and phyllon meaning "leaf". It belongs to a group of related species known as the corkbarks, or lorea group, within the genus Hakea, most of which are found across Australia's arid interior.

== Distribution and habitat ==
Hakea chordophylla ranges across the interior of central and northern Australia, from western Queensland through to northern Western Australia, to south of Karratha. A widespread species growing in spinifex grassland, woodland and scrubland on stony or red-brown sandy soil sometimes in stony laterite.

== Use in horticulture ==
This hakea is a slow growing but attractive plant in cultivation, its leaves and bark a feature. Full sun and good drainage are helpful.
