= Argadargada Station =

Pastoral lease in the Northern Territory

Coordinates: 21°41′12″S 136°39′20″E

Location in the Northern Territory

Argadargada Station is a pastoral lease that operates as a cattle station in the Northern Territory of Australia.

== Location ==
It is situated about 140 kilometres (87 mi) south of Alpurrurulam and 480 kilometres (298 mi) north east of Alice Springs. The property shares a boundary with Annitowa and Ooratippra to the west, Lucy Creek and Manners Creek Station to the south, Lake Nash and Georgina Downs to the east and the Atnetye Aboriginal Land Trust to the south. The property is bisected by the Sandover Highway.

== Description ==
The 5,139 km^{2} (1,984 sq mi) property has a mix of terrain including open flat plains of Mitchell grass, buffel and Flinders grass over massive portions, and a mix of slightly undulating country with other sections of break-away country to the southern parts of the leasehold. Vegetation found within the boundaries includes mulga, bloodwood, gidyea, coolabah, ghost gum with an area of soft spinifex. The Sandover River passes through the property, providing flood-out country. In 2010 Argadargada was stocked with around 6,000 head cattle, mostly Charbray, Charolais and Bos Indicus breeds.

== History ==
The traditional owners of the area are the Yaroinga people, who inhabited around 11,900 square miles (31,000 km^{2}) of country straddling both the Northern Territory and Queensland, including Argadargada toward the western edge of their range.

Bores were sunk in the area in 1918 a few miles west of the Argadargada waterhole.

The station was established in 1951 by Damian Miller and Milton Willick, who had a difficult time with the property, losing 1,300 head of cattle in 1953–54 to gidgee poisoning. In 1954 Calder joined the partnership and became the manager before they sold the station in 1964. The property occupied an area of 1,600 sq mi (4,100 km^{2}) when it was first taken up, and construction of the homestead began in or after 1952. Milton and Phyllis Willick lived in tents until all materials arrived.

The lessee of the station in 1998 was Dick Rogers when the property was 5,051 km^{2} (1,950 sq mi) in size and the land resources were mapped and surveyed with 35 land units identified and described.

The Broad family bought the property in 2003 for A$3 million.

In 2010, Peter Hughes of the Georgina Pastoral Company acquired the property for A$5 million from the Broad family. The company also own the adjoining property Lake Nash Station.

The Rushton family moved to Argadargada in 2017 to manage the property for the Georgina Pastoral Company.

== See also ==
- List of ranches and stations
