= Headingly Station =

Pastoral lease in Queensland

Coordinates: 21.32354°S 138.28987°E

Location in Queensland

Headingly Station often just referred to as Headingly is a pastoral lease that operates as a cattle station. It is located about 156 kilometres (97 mi) south of Camooweal and 133 kilometres (83 mi) west of Dajarra in Queensland.

The property occupies an area of 10,032 square kilometres (3,873 sq mi) of Queensland's Gulf country and is able to carry a herd of approximately 40,000 Santa Gertrudis cattle. It is currently owned by the Australian Agricultural Company. The station is composed of black soil downs country with some timbered area scattered throughout along the Georgina River, ample feed is available to the stock in the form of Mitchell and Flinders grasses. It consists of three leases that operate as one entity, the leases being Headingly, Wolgra and Carandotta.

== History ==
In 1881 the property was owned by Messrs Milsom and de Stage when it took delivery of 1,800 Enniskillen cattle.

In 1904, 1,400 head of cattle were removed from the station to restock Durham Downs Station further south in the Channel Country. Sidney Kidman acquired the property in 1905.

The station had been abandoned some time prior to 1908 but was taken up again in that year by Messrs Philip, Leahy and Co. who planned to stock the property with 5,000 cattle. Robert Philip sold the station in 1911, at this point the station had an area of 1,200 square miles (3,108 km^{2}) and was stocked with 3,000 cattle and 120 horses. The purchasers were Messrs Barton and Gilders. The property was described as excellent sheep country and would be under sheep when the railway goes there.

In 1953 the property was owned by the Peel River Land and mineral Company which took 200 bulls and transferred them by road train to Auvergne Station in the Kimberley region of Western Australia.

== See also ==
- List of ranches and stations
- List of the largest stations in Australia
