= Warburton, Queensland =

Warburton
- Suburb
- Interactive map of Warburton
- Coordinates: 22.4615°S 140.9170°E
- Country: Australia
- State: Queensland
- LGA: Shire of Boulia
- Location: 163 km (101 mi) SW of Boulia; 258 km (160 mi) W of Winton; 1,123 km (698 mi) WNW of Rockhampton; 1,614 km (1,003 mi) NW of Brisbane

Government
  - State electorate: Gregory
  - Federal division: Kennedy

Area
  - Total: 2,656.1 km^{2} (1,025.5 sq mi)

Population
  - Total: 0 (2021 census)
  - Density: 0.00000/km^{2} (0.0000/sq mi)
- Time zone: UTC+10:00 (AEST)
- Postcode: 4823
Suburbs around Warburton
Selwyn	Selwyn	Middleton
Warenda	Warburton	Middleton
Min Min	Min Min	Middleton

Warburton is an outback locality in the Shire of Boulia, Queensland, Australia. In the 2021 census, Warburton had "no people or a very low population".

== Geography ==
Warburton is in the Channel Country. All watercourses in this area are part of the Lake Eyre drainage basin, and most will dry up before their water reaches Lake Eyre.

The predominant land use is grazing on native vegetation.

== Demographics ==
In the 2016 census, Warburton had "no people or a very low population".

In the 2021 census, Warburton had "no people or a very low population".

== Education ==
There are no schools in Warburton. The nearest government primary school is in Boulia but might be infeasible for a daily commute. The nearest government secondary schools are in Winton and Mount Isa and are all too far for a daily commute. The Spinifex State College in Mount Isa offers boarding facilities. Other alternatives would be distance education on other boarding schools.
