= Boulia Stone House =

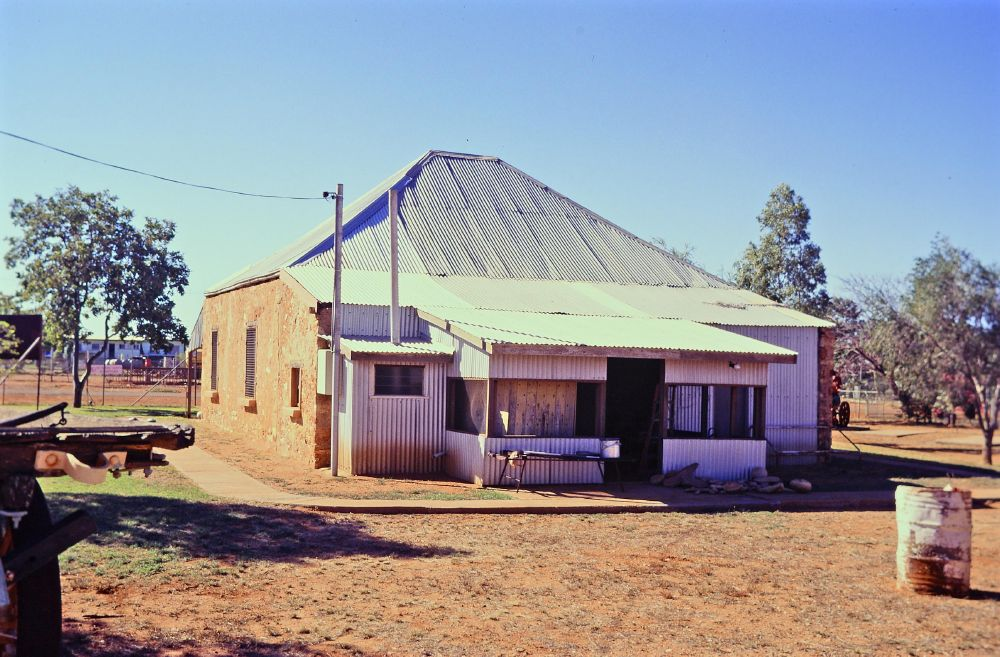
- Boulia Stone House, 1996

- Location within Queensland Location within Australia
- 22.9136°S 139.9078°E
- Location: Pituri Street, Boulia, Shire of Boulia, Queensland, Australia

History
- Design period: 1870s–1890s (late 19th century)
- Built: 1880s–1890s

Queensland Heritage Register
- Official name: Boulia Stone House
- Type: state heritage (built)
- Designated: 21 October 1992
- Reference no.: 600039
- Significant period: 1880s–1890s (fabric & historical)
- Significant components: kitchen/kitchen house, residential accommodation – main house, basement / sub–floor

Boulia Stone House is a heritage-listed detached house at Pituri Street, Boulia, Shire of Boulia, Queensland, Australia. It forms part of the site of the Boulia Heritage Complex. It was built circa 1881 to 1885, by stonemasons from Armidale. It was added to the Queensland Heritage Register on 21 October 1992. It is local tradition that the house was constructed as a home for James Edward Jones and his family. Jones became a storekeeper in the business "Burnell and Jones, Merchants and Storekeepers". The last owner of the house was Mabel Sarah Jones, who lived there until 1977, when ownership of the house was transferred to the Boulia Shire Council for restoration.

== Historical Context ==
By the mid 1870s settlement had spread throughout north and west Queensland. Although wool and sheep prices improved in the early 1870s other problems, such as isolation, high carriage rates, shortage of labour and distances from markets remained serious. However, by 1873 capital for improvements became available from southern investors which led to a greater consolidation of the pastoral industry particularly in Western Queensland.

By 1877 a small settlement had been established on the bank of the Burke River. A community of tents sprang up around a store established by Ernest Henry, probably in the vicinity of a former carriers camp on the Boulia Waterhole. By 1879 a town reserve had been proclaimed. This reserve, of 1,280 acres (520 ha), was resumed from the Bulla Bulla No.2 and No.4 Runs.

The town developed slowly although a mail run to Cloncurry started fairly quickly. The town was surveyed in 1882 by Government Surveyor Hartnell and the first land sales took place in 1883. Government facilities were established soon after. In 1883 a clerk of petty sessions was appointed and a telegraph station constructed in 1884.

The introduction of the Crown Land Act 1884 brought some changes to the small community. Part of the role of the 1884 Land Act was to provide for resumptions from pastoral holdings and to make "Agricultural and Grazing Farm Selection" a basic feature of permanent land settlement. While pastoralists in the western districts were not subject to this act they could apply to have their leases consolidated. Many pastoralists welcomed the idea of consolidation because the new settlers would provide a stable source of labour.

By 1891 Boulia had developed into a substantial community. In the Queensland Post Office Directories it was described as a pastoral town on the banks of the Burke River with a population of 150. There was a police magistrate, clerk of petty sessions, one sergeant of police, three constables and a tracker, post and telegraph office, a line repairer, two hotels, (The Australian and the Royal), a saddler and three storekeepers. By 1893 a school and progress association had been established.

The land on which the Stone House was constructed was purchased by Henry Sanders Shaw in March 1884. James Edward Jones, owner of the land for twenty years, purchased the site in 1897. The land was sold in 1917 to William Thomas Cobley Lilley and repurchased by James Edward Jones' family in 1939. The property remained in the hands of the Jones family until 1978 when the Shire of Boulia purchased it.

Three stonemasons, from Armidale, New South Wales, were employed to work on the building which apparently took four years to construct. The stone is believed to have been quarried from nearby Limestone Ridge, while the roof framing timbers were cut at a local saw pit, and the iron roof sheeting carried by rail to Hughenden then by dray to Boulia. The house was reputedly constructed without nails.

Interestingly, James Jones did not purchase the property until 1897, and, although he may have leased the land from Henry Shaw, there is no record of a lease on the titles information. It is known, however, that Jones took out a mortgage of £230 eight months after purchasing the property in January 1897.

Burnell and Jones, Merchants, appear in the Queensland Post Office Directories for Boulia in 1889. They continued as storekeepers in a partnership until the 1894–95 issue of the Directories after which only JE Jones is identified as a storekeeper. James Jones remained a storekeeper until 1913 when he is identified as a butcher. From 1920 to 1933 he was a gardener in Boulia.

The purchase of the block on the corner of Pituri and Hamilton Streets and the dissolution of the partnership with Burnell coincide with James Jones taking a mortgage on the property. It is possible that he constructed the house at that time. A further possibility is that the building was constructed as a store, by James Jones, with two entrances and a cellar for the storage of perishable goods.

Conservation work on the building was funded by a National Trust grant in 1976–77. The work was planned by National Trust architects and the plaster and masonry repairs were carried out by Brisbane plasterer Gino Sandrin.

After repair works were completed the building was converted to a museum and opened in the mid 1980s. In 1987 Boulia Historical Society was formed to assist with the running of the museum. In February 1994 the roof was damaged in a severe storm.

== Description ==
Boulia is a small township in far western Queensland, some 300 kilometres (190 mi) south of Mount Isa, with a population of about three hundred. The Stone House is situated on the corner of Pituri and Hamilton Streets, one block from Herbert Street, the main street of Boulia.

Although the majority of the surviving buildings of the town date from the 1930s or later, there are some remaining early timber structures, such as the core of the Post Office (1885). The only other evidence of stone construction nearby is the ruins of the Native Police Barracks some 25 kilometres (16 mi) from the town.

The external walls of the house are of local sandstone and limestone with lime mortar weathered by the red sand. The stonework is laid as random rubble to courses, and squared at edges and openings.

The cottage has a core of four stone rooms, with a timber kitchen and enclosed verandah extending to the rear between stone blade walls. The hipped corrugated iron roof features ridge cappings of corrugated sheet beaten flat. There is an open verandah to the front of the house, paved in stone similar to the walls.

Entry to the house is by a pair of glazed French doors which open onto the front verandah. There is a matching opening where a second pair of doors apparently once were. The windows to the house are double hung, with some sashes missing and an assortment of pane arrangements. Other doors are low-waisted four panel doors. The joints of the roof framing are bolted, and the joints of the window frames are pegged.

The interior walls have been plastered. There is presently no ceiling, exposing the timber roof framing to view. The timber top plates show markings of being pit sawn. The front two rooms and the rear verandah have concrete floors, and the other rooms timber. Through a timber trapdoor to the rear of the house, steps lead down to a basement room. It has a low head height, exposed stone walls and an earth floor.

The house presently contains a wide variety of museum artefacts and display cases, demonstrating aspects of early western lifestyle.

The grounds are partly grassed, and have some small trees. To the rear of the site are sheds containing other museum functions. The site is presently enclosed with a high wire mesh fence. At the front of the site is a large sign introducing the museum, and giving background information on the Stone House.

== Heritage listing ==
Boulia Stone House was listed on the Queensland Heritage Register on 21 October 1992 having satisfied the following criteria.

The place is important in demonstrating the evolution or pattern of Queensland's history.

Built in the mid 1880s, the house reflects the growth of Boulia and district after the consolidation of properties under the Crown Land Act 1884, is illustrative of the boom in sheep and wool production after the drought, and is evidence of the role of Boulia as a commercial centre for the district since that time.

Reputedly taking four years to build, it is an example of the utilisation of local materials for construction in remote areas, and is part of the late nineteenth century stone building tradition of central Australia which stretched into western Queensland.

The place demonstrates rare, uncommon or endangered aspects of Queensland's cultural heritage.

The Stone House is recognised as one of Boulia's oldest surviving buildings, and is also the only stone building extant in the township. It is greatly valued by the local community as one of their few identified historic places. Because of the role they the house has played in the commercial and public life of the town, this value is demonstrated by its purchase by the local Council, and its establishment as the local museum.

The place is important because of its aesthetic significance.

The Stone House is recognised for its aesthetic qualities, and its contribution to the character of the Boulia townscape. Much of the early building fabric still exists, and the external stone walls in particular reflect the colours and textures of the region.

The place has a special association with the life or work of a particular person, group or organisation of importance in Queensland's history.

Before being bought by the Boulia Shire Council, the house remained in the Jones family for at least 70 of its 90 years, and members of that family still live in the area.
