= Min Min, Queensland =

Min Min
- Suburb
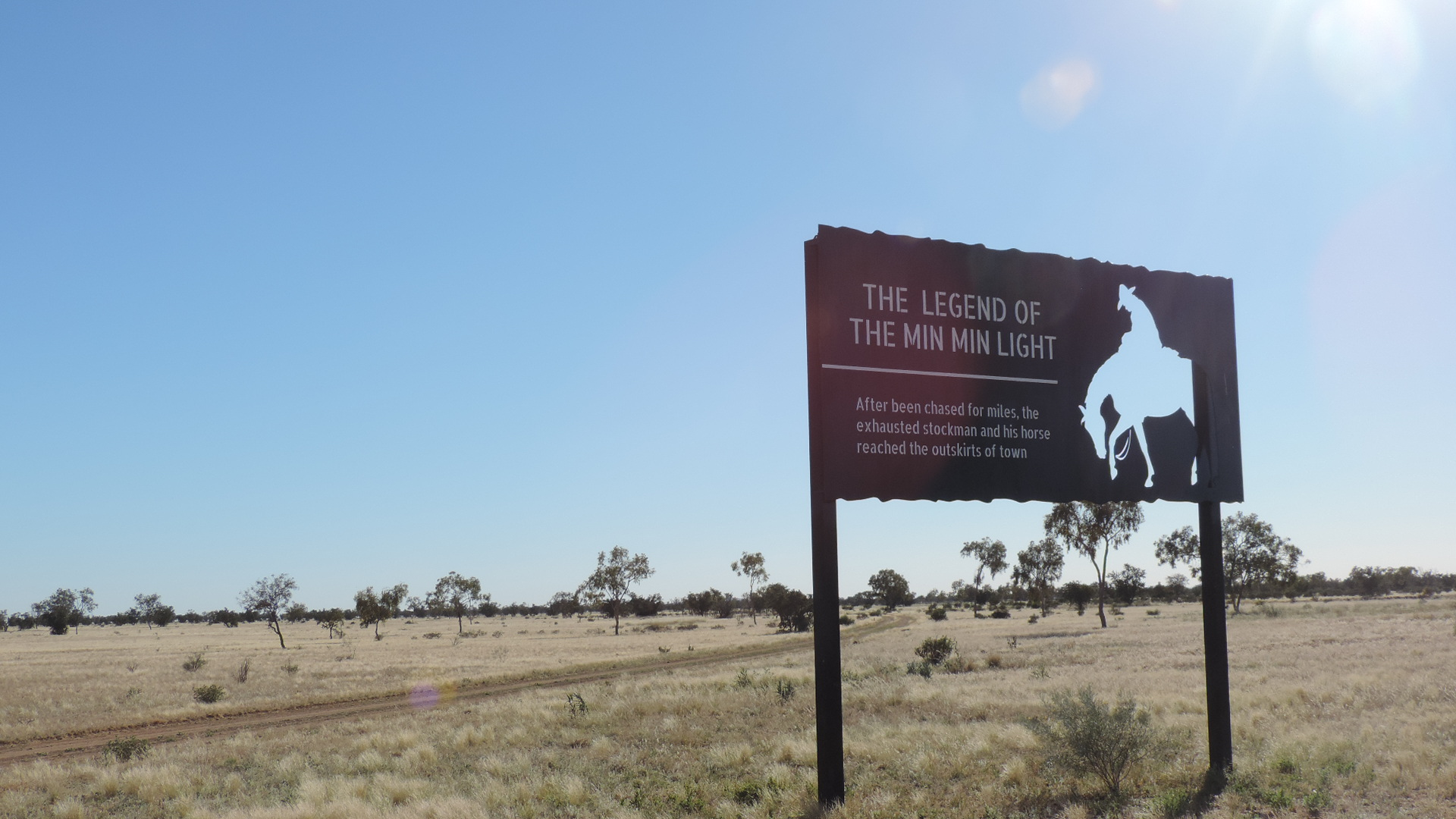
- Site of the Min Min Hotel, famous for its connection with the Min Min lights, 2019

- Interactive map of Min Min
- Coordinates: 22.9165°S 140.6564°E
- Country: Australia
- State: Queensland
- LGA: Shire of Boulia
- Location: 102 km (63 mi) E of Boulia; 273 km (170 mi) WSW of Winton; 405 km (252 mi) SSE of Mount Isa; 1,630 km (1,010 mi) NW of Brisbane

Government
  - State electorate: Gregory
  - Federal division: Kennedy

Area
  - Total: 3,721.3 km^{2} (1,436.8 sq mi)

Population
  - Total: 0 (2021 census)
  - Density: 0.00000/km^{2} (0.0000/sq mi)
- Time zone: UTC+10:00 (AEST)
- Postcode: 4829
Suburbs around Min Min
Warenda	Warenda	Warburton
Wills	Min Min	Middleton
Wills	Diamantina Lakes	Middleton

Min Min is an uninhabited outback locality in the Shire of Boulia, Queensland, Australia. The locality is most notable for the Min Min light, an unexplained aerial phenomenon reported throughout Australia's outback that was first observed by Europeans at Min Min (the phenomenon was known to Indigenous people prior to European settlement). The settlement is now a ghost town. In the 2021 census, Min Min had "no people or a very low population".

== Geography ==
Min Min is in the Channel Country. All watercourses in this area are part of the Lake Eyre drainage basin, and most will dry up before their water reaches Lake Eyre.

The predominant land use is grazing on native vegetation.

== History ==
The town is most famous for being the source for the name of the aerial phenomenon the Min Min light. One of the earliest recorded European encounters with the light comes from a stockman who lived in Min Min in 1918.

== Demographics ==
In the 2016 census, Min Min had "no people or a very low population".

In the 2021 census, Min Min had "no people or a very low population".

== Education ==
There are no schools in Min Min. The nearest government primary school is in Boulia. The nearest government secondary schools are in Mount Isa and Winton. All of these schools are too distant for a daily commute. The Spinifex State College in Mount Isa offers boarding facilities. Other boarding schools or distance education would be alternatives.

== See also ==
- List of reduplicated Australian place names
