= Lakes Muncoonie, Mumbleberry and Torquinie Important Bird Area =

Lake in Australia

Coordinates: 24°52′03″S 138°42′01″E

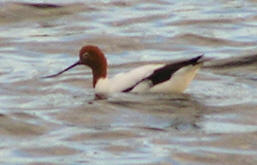
The lakes are an important area for red-necked avocets

The Lakes Muncoonie, Mumbleberry and Torquinie Important Bird Area is a 2013 km^{2} tract of land in the Channel Country of western Queensland, Australia.

== Description ==
The IBA consists of Lakes Muncoonie, Mumbleberry and Torquinie, with the associated swampy floodplain of Mulligan River and Eyre Creek, on grey clay soils. It lies about 80 km west of the small town of Bedourie and is bordered on the west by the longitudinal sand-dunes of the Simpson Desert. Mumbleberry and Torquinie are ephemeral lakes that become inundated in most years; their waters are fresh when first flooded, but increasingly saline as they dry out. The Muncoonie Lakes system comprises an extensive area of floodplains, swamps, permanent waterholes, anastomosing channels and dry lakes.

== Birds ==
The site has been identified by BirdLife International as an Important Bird Area (IBA) because it supports large numbers of waterbirds, the lakes regularly holding over 1% of the world populations of freckled and pink-eared ducks, red-necked avocets, grey teals and sharp-tailed sandpipers. The floodplains have once been systematically surveyed when flooded (in 2001), when they probably contained over a million waterbirds. The IBA also supports a population of Eyrean grasswrens.
