= Warenda, Queensland =

Warenda
- Suburb
- Interactive map of Warenda
- Coordinates: 22.4740°S 140.2720°E
- Country: Australia
- State: Queensland
- LGA: Shire of Boulia
- Location: 126 km (78 mi) NE of Boulia; 334 km (208 mi) W of Winton; 341 km (212 mi) SSE of Mount Isa; 1,199 km (745 mi) W of Rockhampton; 1,691 km (1,051 mi) NW of Brisbane

Government
  - State electorate: Gregory
  - Federal division: Kennedy

Area
  - Total: 3,320.6 km^{2} (1,282.1 sq mi)

Population
  - Total: 0 (2021 census)
  - Density: 0.00000/km^{2} (0.0000/sq mi)
- Time zone: UTC+10:00 (AEST)
- Postcode: 4829
Suburbs around Warenda
Buckingham	Selwyn	Selwyn
Georgina	Warenda	Warburton
Wills	Min Min	Min Min

Warenda is an outback locality in the Shire of Boulia, Queensland, Australia. In the 2021 census, Warenda had "no people or a very low population".

== Geography ==
Warenda is in the Channel Country. All watercourses in this area are part of the Lake Eyre drainage basin, and most will dry up before their water reaches Lake Eyre.

Warenda has the following mountains and passes (from north to south):

- Brighton Gap (22.3827°S 140.4175°E)
- Momedah Gap (22.4938°S 140.4033°E)
- Mount Unbunmaroo (22.5308°S 140.2822°E), rising to 387 metres (1,270 ft) above sea level
- Mount Ninmaroo (22.6198°S 140.3058°E), 312 metres (1,024 ft)

The predominant land use is grazing on native vegetation.

== Demographics ==
In the 2016 census, Warenda had "no people or a very low population".

In the 2021 census, Warenda had "no people or a very low population".

== Education ==
There are no schools in Warenda. The nearest government primary schools are in Boulia and Dajarra but might be infeasible for a daily commute. The nearest government secondary schools are in Winton and Mount Isa and are all too far for a daily commute. The Spinifex State College in Mount Isa offers boarding facilities. Other boarding schools or distance education would be options.
