= Georgina River =

River in Queensland, Australia

Coordinates: 23°30′S 139°47′E

Georgina
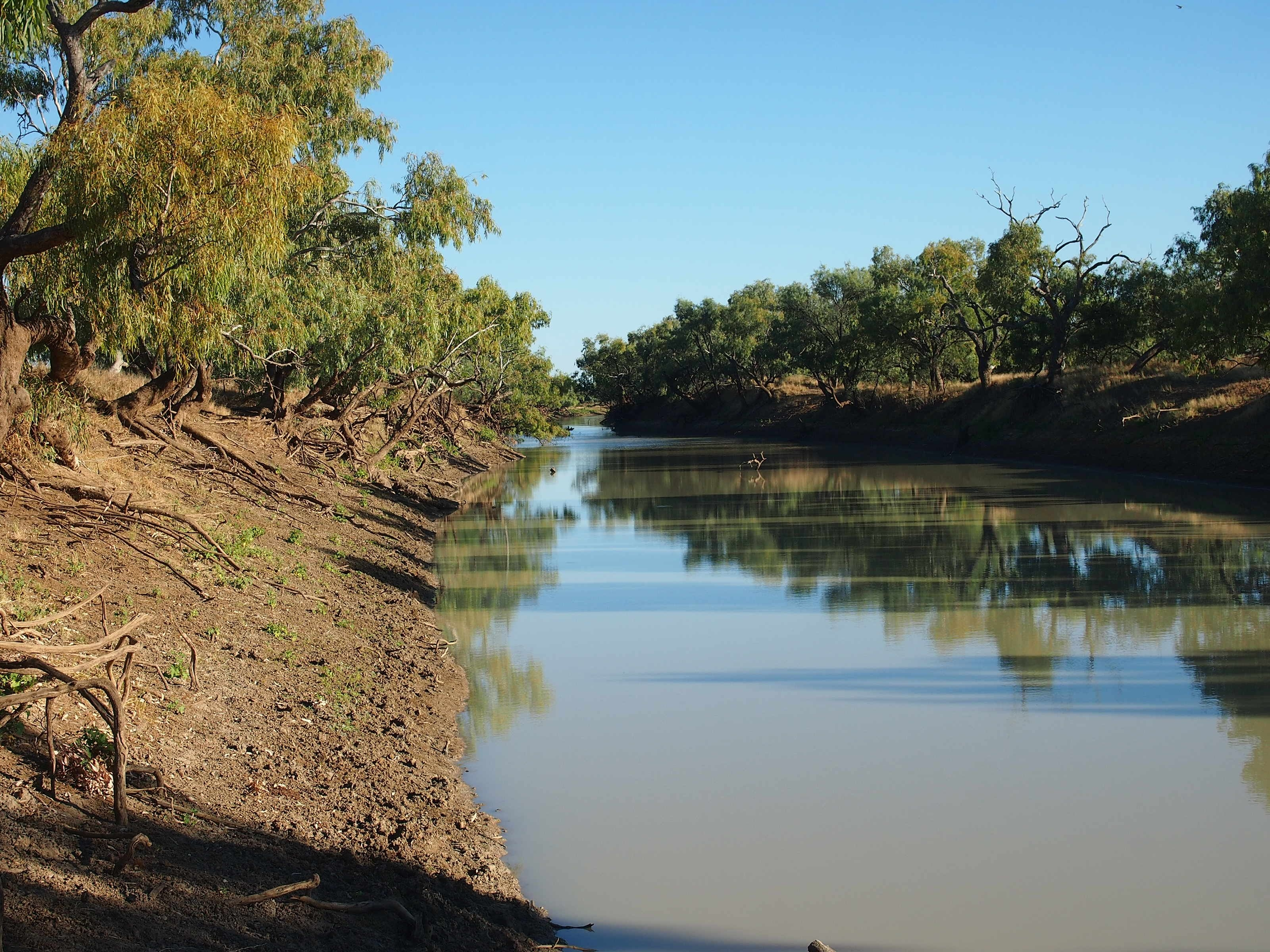

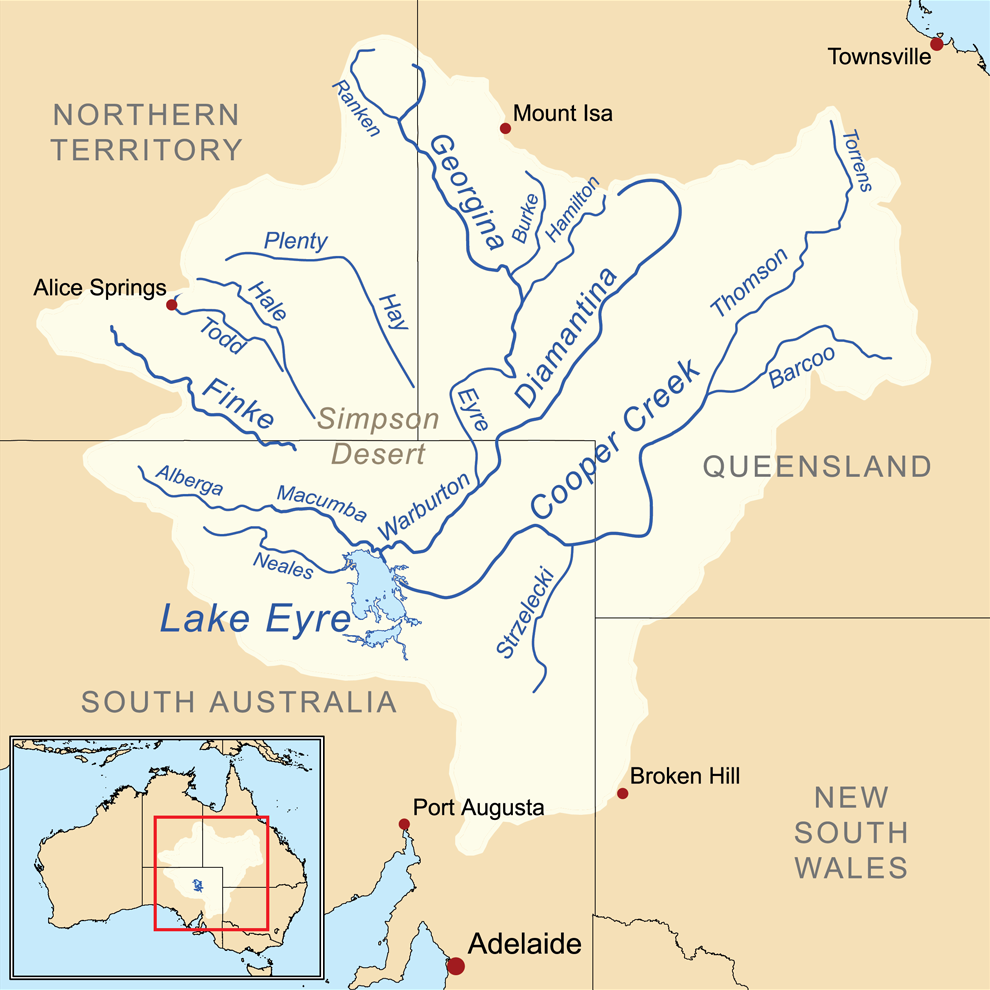
- Map of the Lake Eyre Basin showing Georgina River
- Etymology: Georgina, the daughter of Arthur Kennedy

Location
- Country: Australia
- State/territory: Queensland, Northern Territory
- Region: Central West Queensland, Central Australia
- City: Boulia

Physical characteristics
- Source: Barkly Tableland
  - location: north of Camooweal
- Mouth: confluence with the Eyre Creek
  - elevation: 97 m (318 ft)
- Length: 1,130 km (700 mi)
- Basin size: 232,000 km^{2} (90,000 sq mi)
- Discharge
  - average: 22 m^{3}/s (780 cu ft/s)
  - minimum: 0 m^{3}/s (0 cu ft/s)
  - maximum: 200 m^{3}/s (7,100 cu ft/s)

Basin features
- River system: Lake Eyre basin
- Tributaries
  - left: Buckley River, Templeton River, Burke River, Hamilton River
  - right: Herbert River (NT), Ranken River, Sandover River

The Georgina River is the north-westernmost of the three major rivers of the Channel Country in Central West Queensland, that also flows through a portion of the Northern Territory, in central Australia. Part of the Lake Eyre basin, the Georgina flows in extremely wet years into Lake Eyre.

The river is named in honour of Georgina Mildred Kennedy, the daughter of Queensland governor Arthur Kennedy. The river was originally called the Herbert River before being given its current name in 1890 to avoid confusion with the other river in Queensland that bears that name.

== Geography ==
With its headwaters rising in the Barkly Tableland, north of Camooweal in Queensland, and in the extreme east of the Northern Territory beyond Tennant Creek and to the south draining the northern slopes of the Macdonnell Ranges, the Georgina is formed from several smaller streams over a wide area of north-western Queensland and the eastern Northern Territory. From source to mouth, the Georgina is joined by more than 35 tributaries including the Buckley, Templeton, Burke, Hamilton, Herbert, Ranken, and Sandover rivers; and flows through 26 billabongs. As the Georgina flows south into the Channel Country, it reaches a confluence with Eyre Creek that, in times of peak flow, empties into the Warburton River and ultimately into Lake Eyre.

The basin of the Georgina totals around 232,000 square kilometres (90,000 mi^{2}), or about the same size as the Australian state of Victoria. Because it is so arid, however, its mean annual flow is only about 0.7 km^{3} (570,000 acre⋅ft). There is such extreme variation that — although streamgauging records are too poor to prove it conclusively — meteorological records leave no doubt that there have been many years of zero runoff in the entire basin (1905, 1928 and 1961 would without doubt fit into this category), whilst in very wet years such as 1974, 1977 and 2000, runoff can be as high as 6.28 km^{3} (5,090,000 acre⋅ft) or more.

Although a small part of the Macdonnell Ranges drains into the Georgina, most of the catchment is a flat as the Diamantina, though low ranges are very prominent in the north-west of the basin. This western part of the basin has sandy soils that are too infertile to provide nutritious fodder for cattle or sheep and a large proportion is an Aboriginal reserve. The eastern part of the Georgina catchment near Boulia is very similar to the Diamantina and Cooper basins, being grassy plains with heavy cracking clay soils that are quite fertile and provide very good feed in wet years for livestock. The Lake Machattie Area is an important breeding site for waterbirds.

== Climate ==
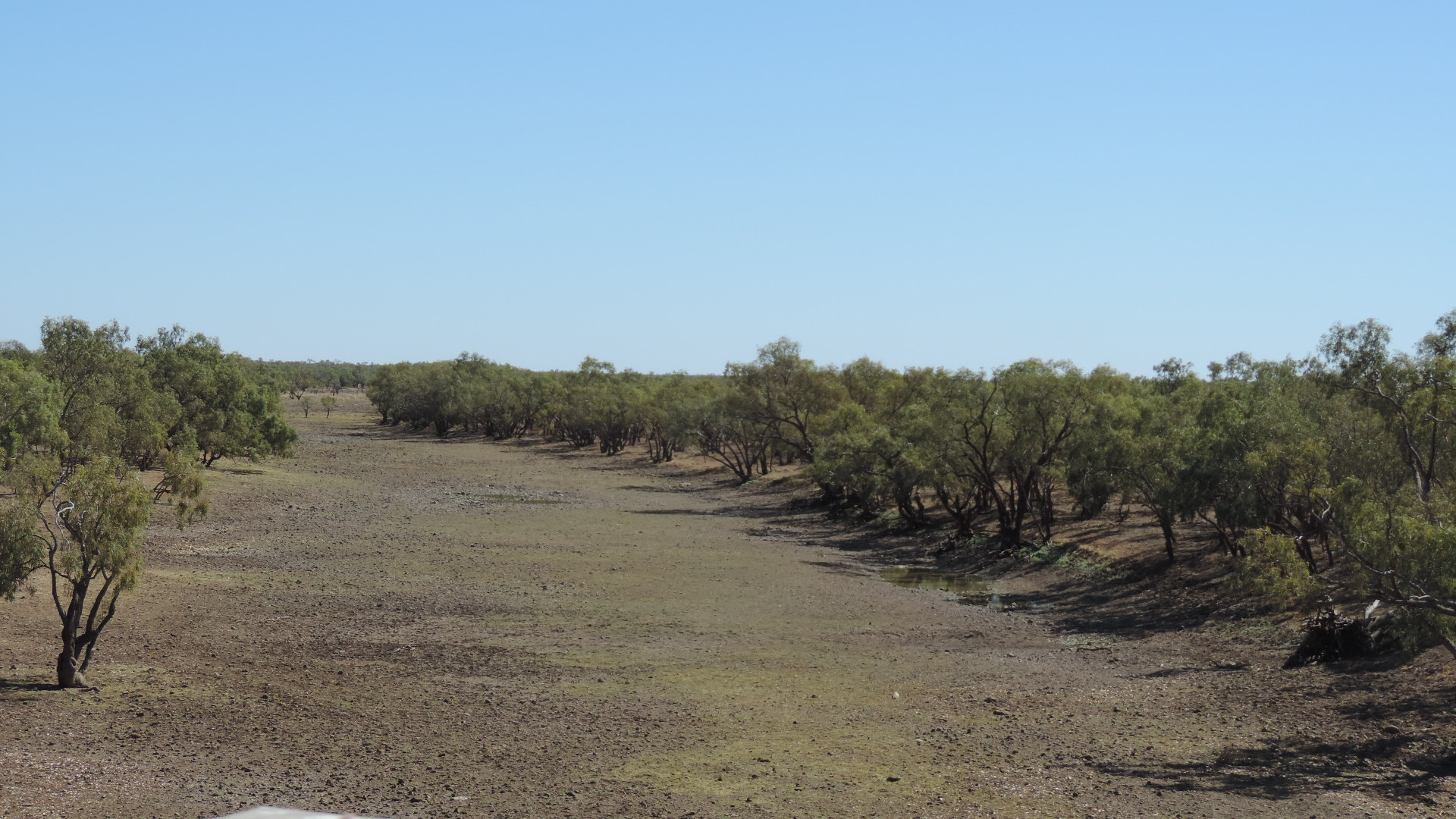
Looking north up the dry river bed from the Georgina River Bridge at Camooweal, July 2019

Climatically, the Georgina catchment tends to be somewhat drier than the Diamantina or Cooper, with average annual rainfall ranging from around 400 millimetres (16 in) north of Camooweal to around 225 millimetres (8.9 in) at Bedourie.

Extremely dry years can give the entire basin less than 100 millimetres (3.9 in) whilst in 1974, 1977 and 2000 many areas had over 800 millimetres (31 in) and some as much as 1,000 millimetres (39 in). Almost all of this rain falls in the summer, and it is quite normal for the period from May to September to not record any measurable falls at all. In extremely wet summer months such as January 1974 or March 1950, most of the catchment can receive as much as 350 millimetres (14 in) in a month or 150 millimetres (5.9 in) in a day or two. Temperatures are generally hot, with most areas having maxima of over 30 °C (86 °F) on over 225 days per year. Frosts are rare but have been reported on occasions in all areas of the basin – however even in June and July maxima are around 25 °C (77 °F).

== Flooding ==
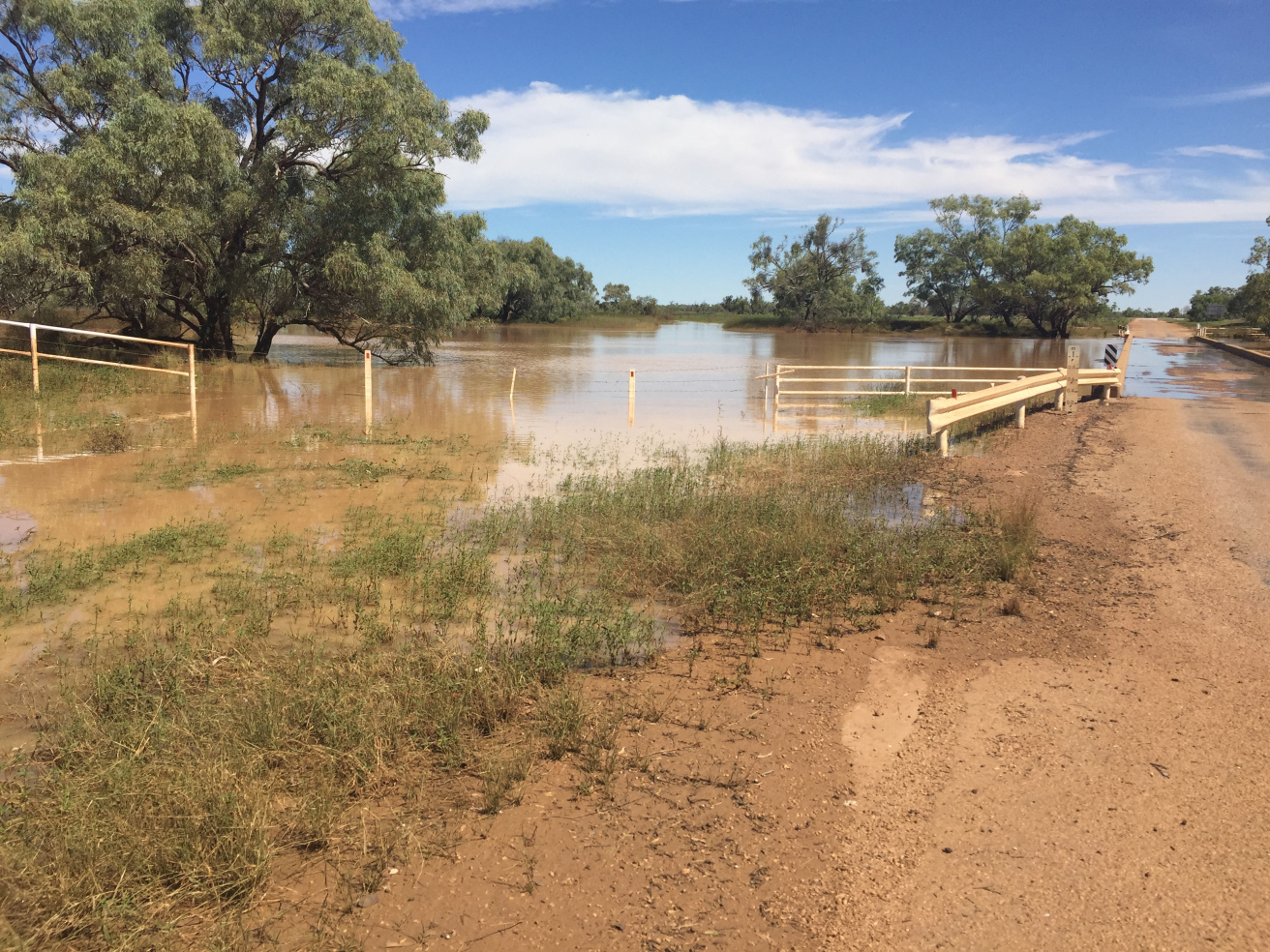
Flooding near Bedourie, 2016

During severe floods the river can be as wide as 15 to 20 kilometres (9.3 to 12.4 mi) in the upper reaches and in the lower reaches from 25 to 30 kilometres (16 to 19 mi) wide. Inundation can last for months at a time, which can disrupt road and rail transport in the area. The highest recorded flood occurred in January 1974.

Flooding occurred at Glenormiston Station in 1885 when somewhere between 12 inches (305 mm) and 17 inches (432 mm) of rain fell over the course of a month. The Georgina River and the Diamatina Rivers both were flooded and the Sandringham station was submerged.

The upper watershed in the Northern Territory were subjected to severe flooding in 1901 when Lake Nash Station experienced over 10 inches (254 mm) of rain in a single day, with the Georgina River running at almost record high levels. The surrounding areas received over 4 inches (102 mm) of rain in 1953 resulting in the River rising over 23 feet (7 m), the highest level in over 36 years.

The lower reaches flooded in 1950 and again in 1953 following heavy rain events further north. The 1953 flood was 6 inches (152 mm) higher at Glengyle Station compared to the 1950 event. The Diamantina River was also in flood and the waters were expected to make it to Lake Eyre.

Moderate flooding was experienced along the river, including Glenormiston Station, in 2010 following heavy rains locally and further north in the Georgina catchment.

Although it is the driest of the three main rivers of the Lake Eyre Basin, there is evidence that the Georgina has, in the past, actually reached the lake more frequently than either the Diamantina or Cooper. Some wave built shingle terraces suggest that during the Medieval Warm Period Lake Eyre held permanent water. Large increases since the late 1960s in rainfall over the Northern Territory and pastoral areas of South and Western Australia that have not been duplicated over Queensland do suggest an enhanced greenhouse effect in the Medieval Warm Period may have caused the Georgina to regularly fill Lake Eyre. However, far too little evidence exists for any certainty of this.

== Georgina River Bridge at Camooweal ==
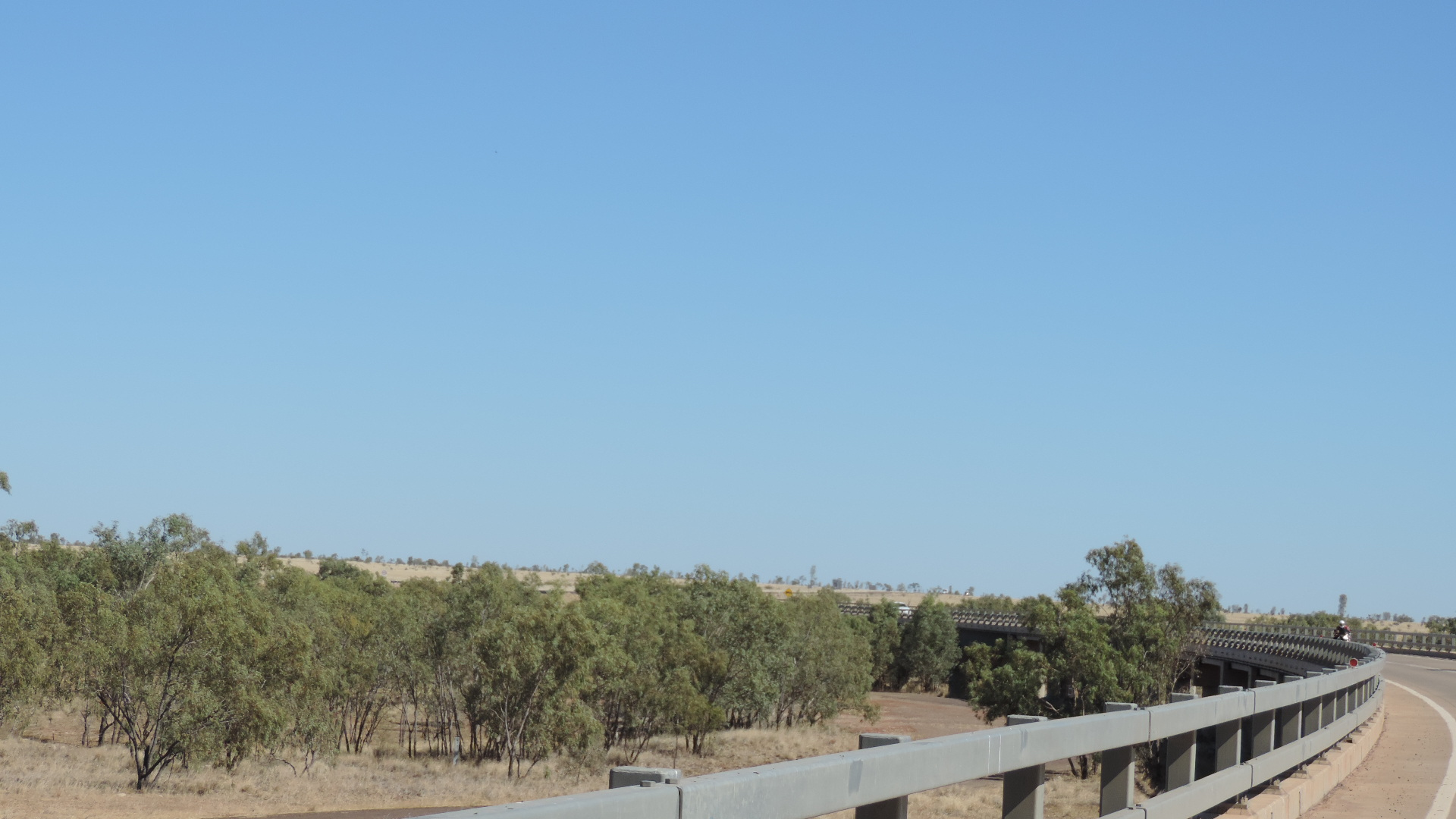
Driving across the Georgina River Bridge from Camooweal looking south at the dry river bed, 2019

Given the economic importance of transport on the Barkly Highway (the only sealed road between Queensland and the Northern Territory), a longstanding problem was the flooding of the Georgina River immediately west of Camooweal in Queensland. As the water levels in the Georgina River vary enormously from being completely dry to flooding, the Barkly Highway bridge over the Georgina River was often unusable for many days due to flooding, with road trains and other heavy vehicles having to wait weeks before it was safe to cross. To alleviate these problems, the Georgina River Bridge was officially opened on 20 December 2002 by Senator Ron Boswell and Steve Breadhauer, Minister for Transport in the Queensland Government. It replaced the previous bridge which was approximately 50 metres (160 ft) south, and is both higher and longer so traffic on the highway can continue to cross during floods. The bridge is 417 metres (1,368 ft) long and is accompanied by a 5.6-kilometre (3.5 mi) highway deviation west from Camooweal. The bridge uses an unusual arch design to avoid placing pylons into the river bed which is culturally significant to the local Dugalunji people, who call the new bridge Ilaga Thuwani meaning The Camping Ground of the Rainbow Serpent.

== See also ==
- List of rivers of Australia § Northern Territory
- List of rivers of Australia § Queensland
