= Wills, Queensland =

Wills
- Suburb
- Interactive map of Wills
- Coordinates: 23.0376°S 140.0189°E
- Country: Australia
- State: Queensland
- LGA: Shire of Boulia
- Location: 319 km (198 mi) S of Mount Isa; 347 km (216 mi) W of Winton; 1,212 km (753 mi) W of Rockhampton; 1,226 km (762 mi) NW of Roma; 1,703 km (1,058 mi) NW of Brisbane

Government
  - State electorate: Gregory
  - Federal division: Kennedy

Area
  - Total: 7,256.0 km^{2} (2,801.6 sq mi)

Population
  - Total: 31 (2021 census)
  - Density: 0.00427/km^{2} (0.01107/sq mi)
- Time zone: UTC+10:00 (AEST)
- Postcode: 4829
Suburbs around Wills
Georgina	Warenda	Warenda
Amaroo	Wills	Min Min
Amaroo	Bedourie	Diamantina Lakes

Wills is an outback locality in the Shire of Boulia, Queensland, Australia. In the 2021 census, Wills had a population of 31 people.

== Geography ==
Wills is in the Channel Country. All watercourses in this area are part of the Lake Eyre drainage basin, and most will dry up before their water reaches Lake Eyre.

The predominant land use is grazing on native vegetation.

The locality of Boulia is an "island" within Wills, which is contrary to the locality boundary principles of the Queensland Government.

== Demographics ==
In the 2016 census, Wills had a population of 14 people.

In the 2021 census, Wills had a population of 31 people.

== Education ==
There are no schools in Wills. The nearest government primary school is Boulia State School in Boulia, but some parts of Wills are distant for a daily commute The nearest government secondary schools are in Winton and Mount Isa which are both too far for a daily commute. The Spinifex State College in Mount Isa offers boarding facilities. The alternatives are distance education and boarding school.
