= Lake Machattie Area =

Coordinates: 24°49′25″S 139°33′52″E

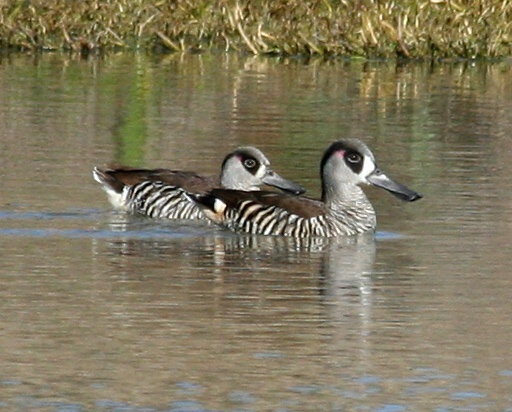
The IBA is an important area for pink-eared ducks

The Lake Machattie Area is a 909 km^{2} tract of land comprising Lakes Machattie, Mipia and Koolivoo, with the surrounding Georgina River and Eyre Creek floodplains, in the arid Channel Country of western Queensland, Australia. The area is important as a breeding site for waterbirds.

== Description ==
The floodplains are seasonally flooded and contain several freshwater lakes which continue to hold water well after the floods have receded. Lakes Mipia and Koolivoo are inundated annually, with Mipia often retaining water until the following flood season, but Koolivoo usually dries up by early summer. Lake Machattie is flooded about once in three years. The three lakes are fresh when filled by floods but become increasingly saline as they dry out. The floodplains are characterised by anastomosing channels and waterholes lined with open coolibah woodland, surrounded by grasslands, forblands, samphire and lignum. Average annual rainfall is 168 mm.

== Birds ==
The site has been identified by BirdLife International as an Important Bird Area (IBA) because it has supported over 300,000 waterbirds, including over 1% of the world populations of freckled and pink-eared ducks, Australian pelicans, straw-necked ibises, royal spoonbills, little black cormorants, red-necked avocets and sharp-tailed sandpipers. It also supports Australian bustards and grey grasswrens. Large numbers of Australian pratincoles, black-tailed godwits and flock bronzewings have been recorded.
