= Eyre Creek (Lake Eyre basin) =

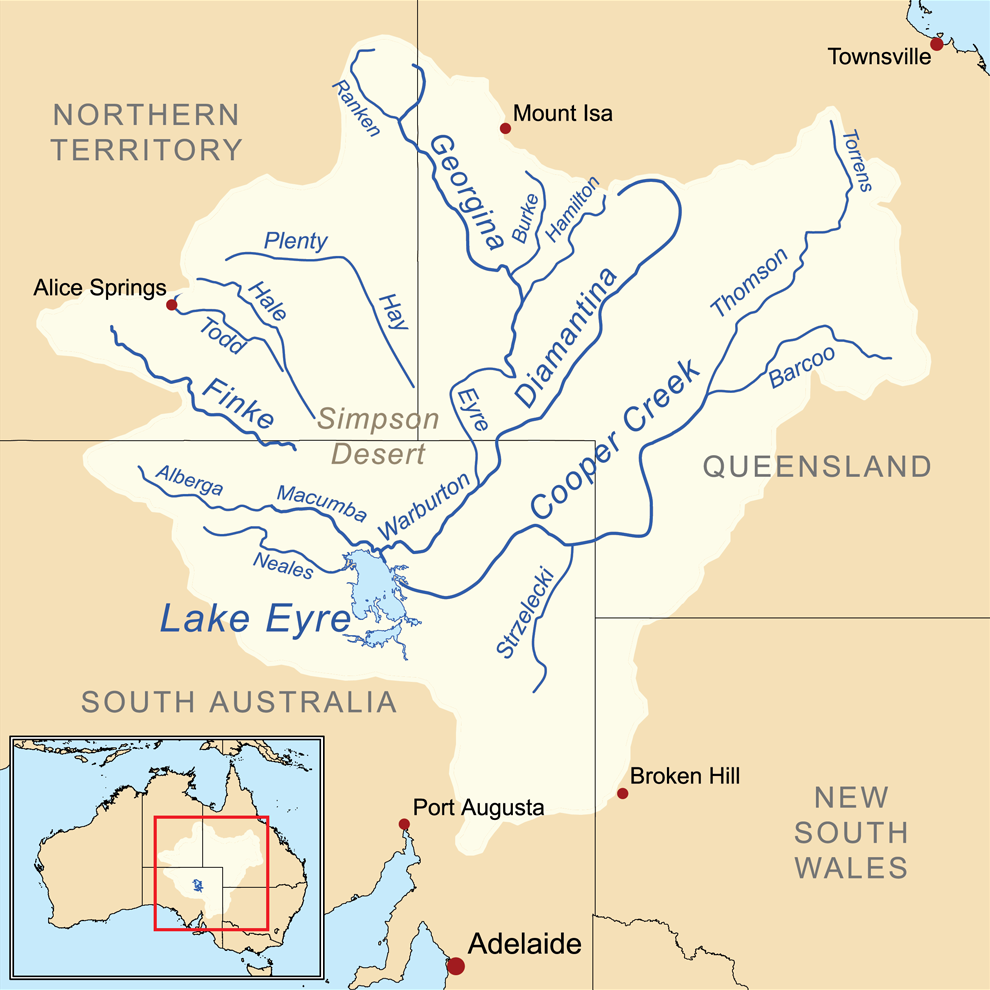
- Lake Eyre drainage basin including the major rivers

Location
- State: Queensland
- State: South Australia

Physical characteristics
- Source: Confluence of the Georgina River and the Burke River
  - location: Marion Downs Station
- Mouth: Warburton River at the confluence of Eyre Creek and the Diamantina River
  - coordinates: 26°40′47″S 138°59′16″E

Basin features
- River system: Lake Eyre Basin
- Tributaries
  - left: Hamilton River

Eyre Creek is a tributary of the Warburton River. It flows from the western southwest corner of Queensland into the northeastern corner of South Australia.

Eyre Creek is fed by the Georgina River and Burke River in the vicinity of Marion Downs Station. The confluence of Eyre Creek and the Diamantina River is the source of the Warburton River.
