= Burke River (Queensland) =

Coordinates: 22°48′47.14″S 140°01′06.18″E

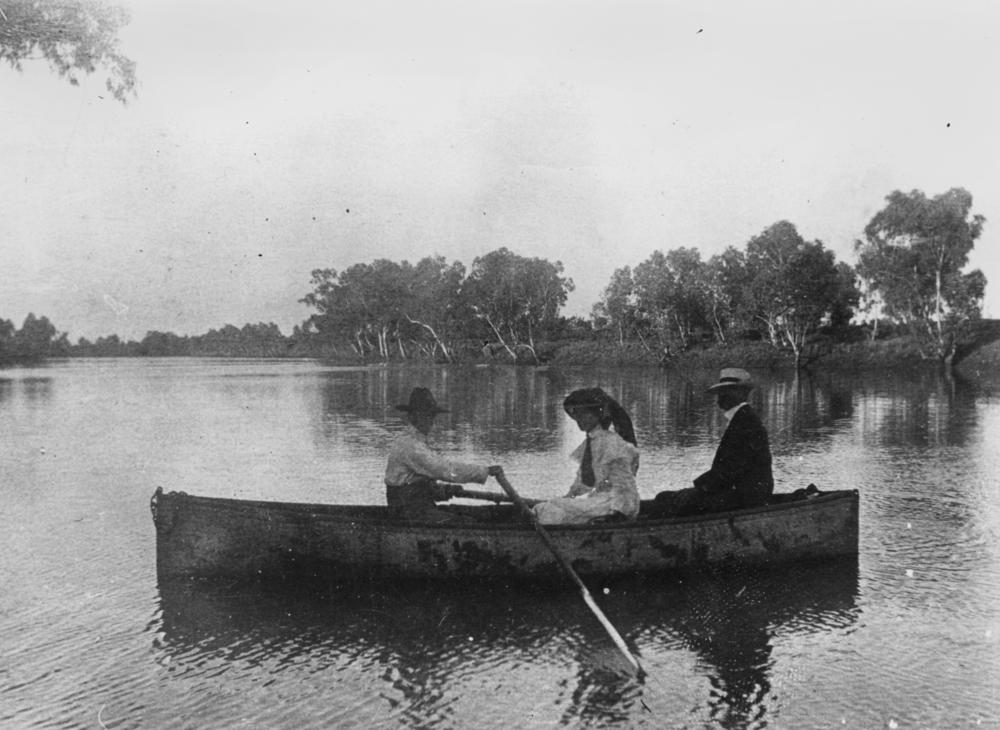
- Boating on the Bourke River at Boulia, Queensland, ca.1906

Location
- Country: Australia
- State: Queensland
- Region: Central West Queensland
- City: Boulia

Physical characteristics
- Source: Standish Ranges
- Mouth: confluence with Eyre Creek

Basin features
- River system: Georgina River, Lake Eyre basin

The Burke River is an ephemeral river in Central West Queensland, Australia. The river was named in memory of Robert O'Hara Burke of the Burke and Wills expedition.

The Burke River rises in the Standish Range north of Boulia. It flows south through Boulia towards the Simpson Desert in the Lake Eyre Basin. The river flows into the Georgina River. The Hamilton River is the second major Queensland river that flows into the Georgina downstream from the confluence with the Burke.

Yulluna (also known as Yalarnga, Yalarrnga, Jalanga, Jalannga, Wonganja, Gunggalida, Jokula) is an Australian Aboriginal language. The Yulluna language region includes the local government boundaries of the Shire of Cloncurry and other areas near the Gulf of Carpentaria including the area around the Burke River.

== Gallery ==
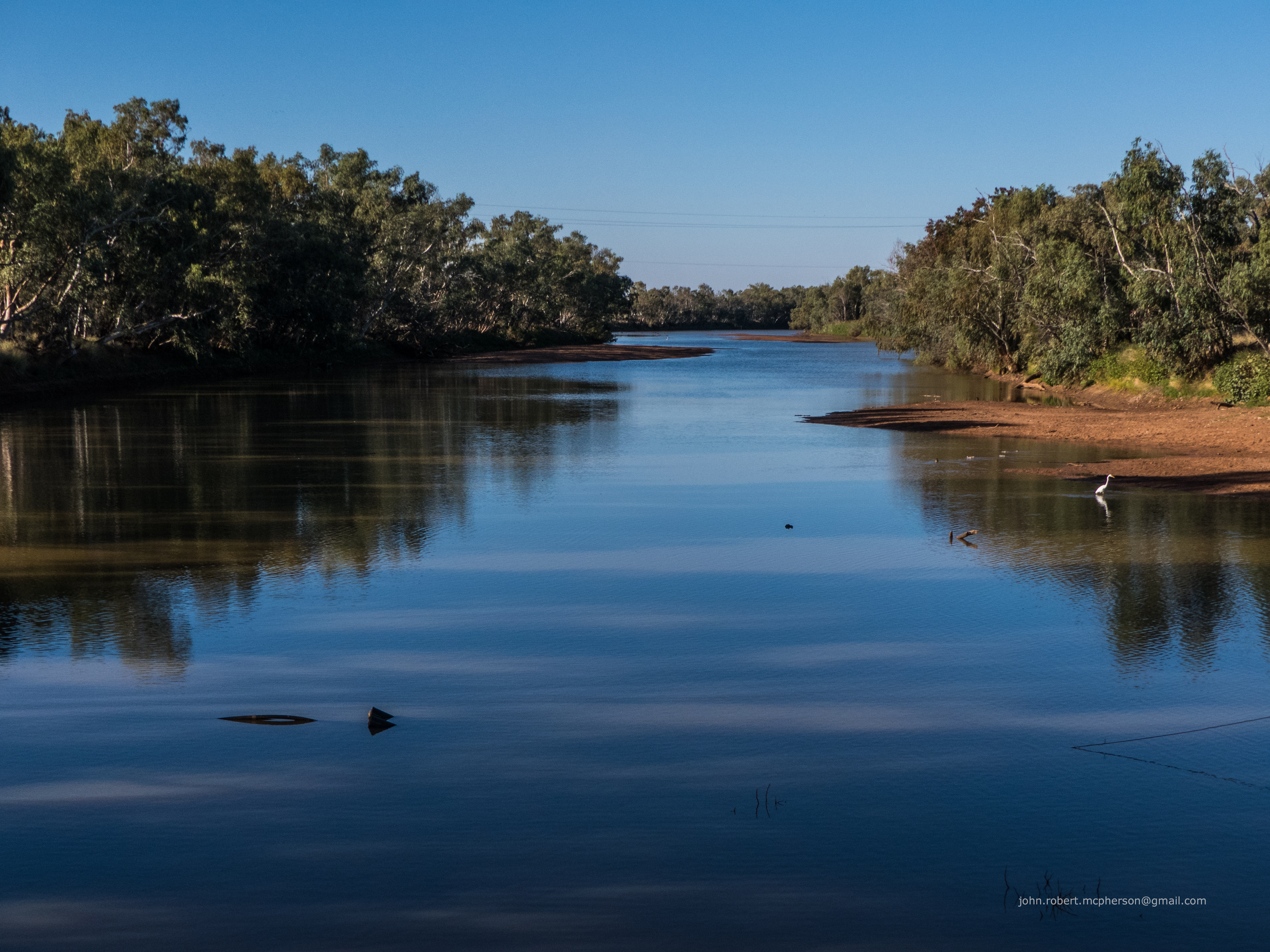
Permanent waterhole at the Robert O'Hara Burke Bridge, Boulia.

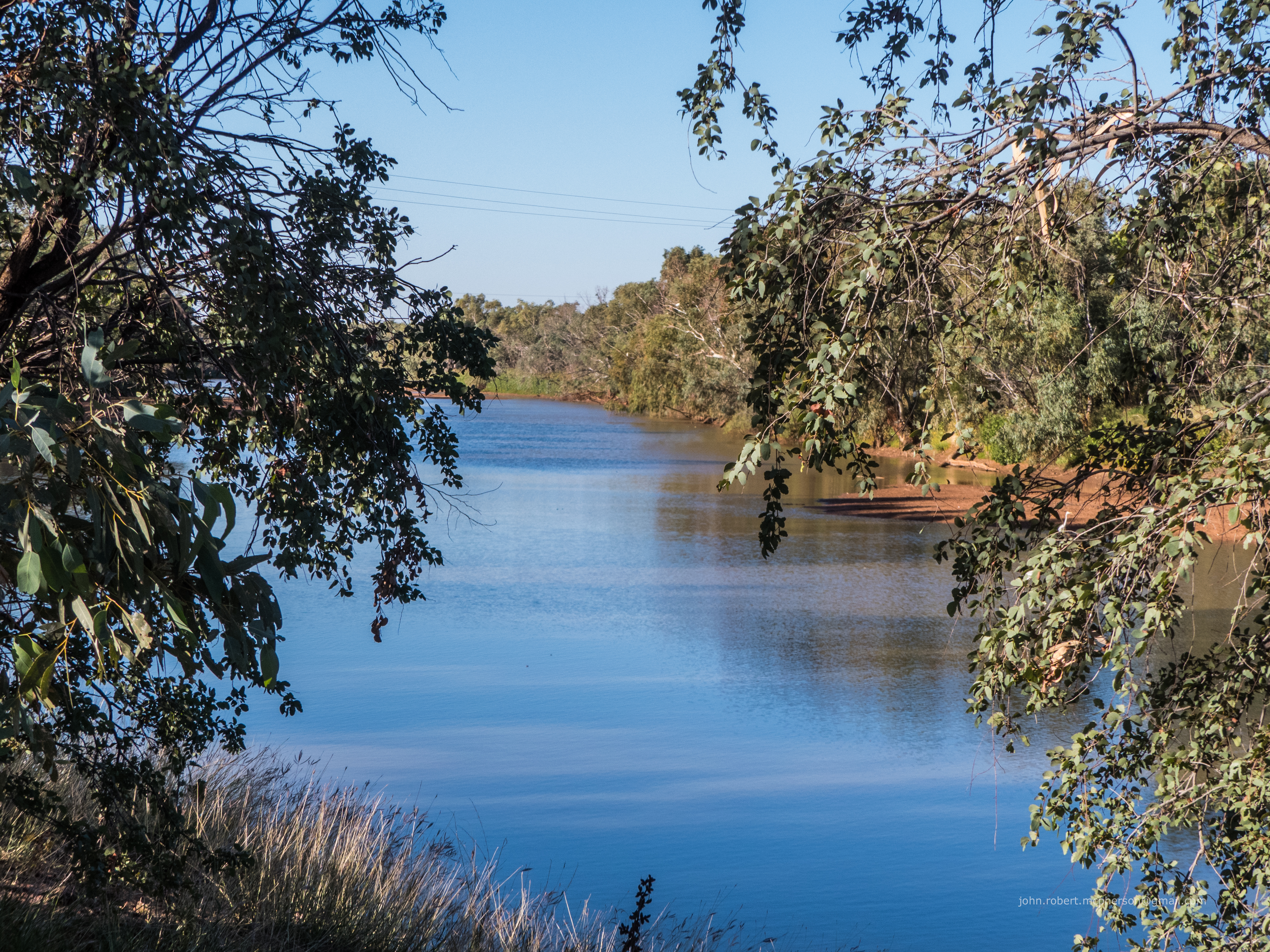
Permanent waterhole at the Robert O'Hara Burke Bridge, Boulia.

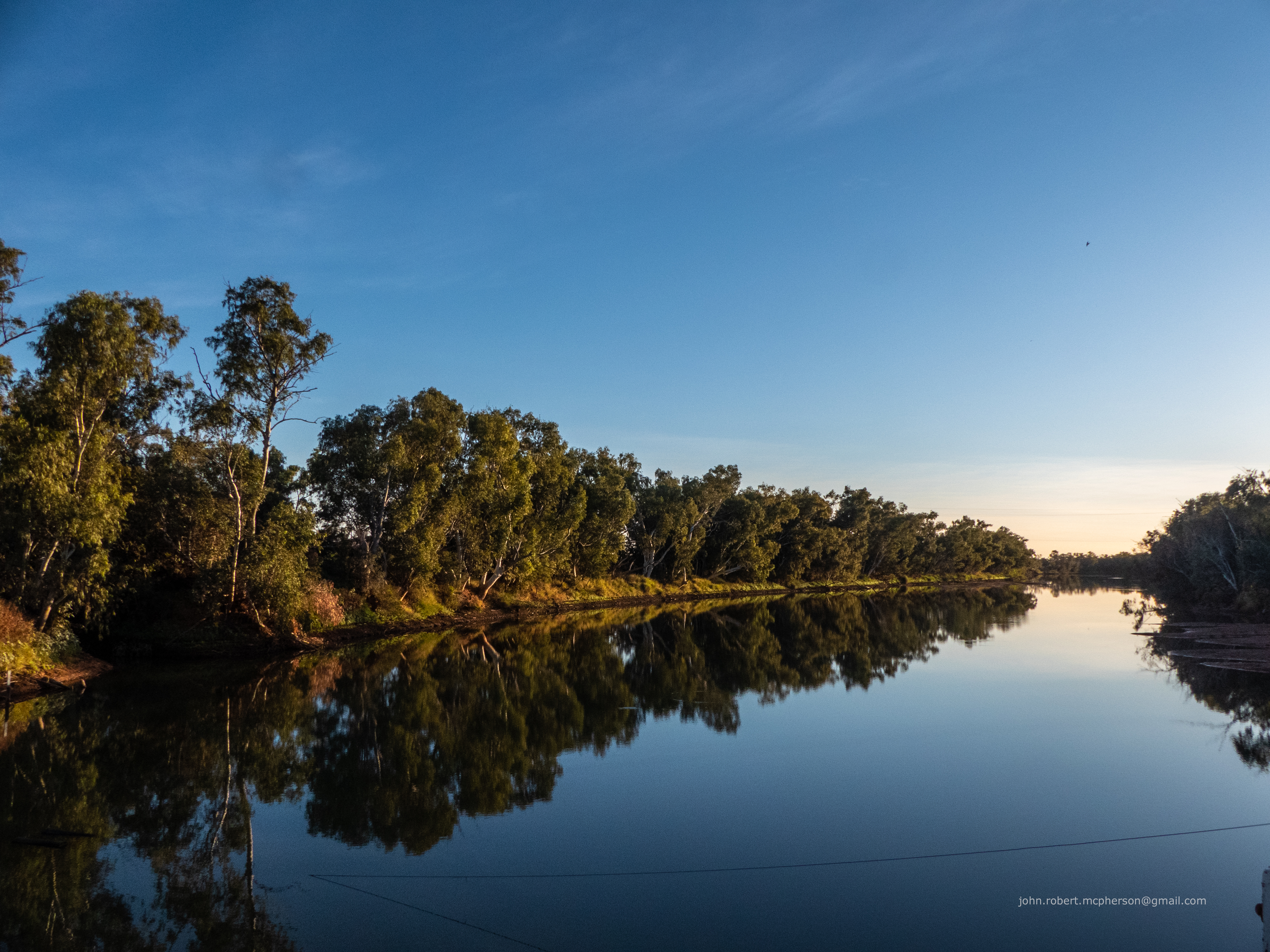
Eucalyptus camaldulensis lining the banks of the Burke River, Boulia.

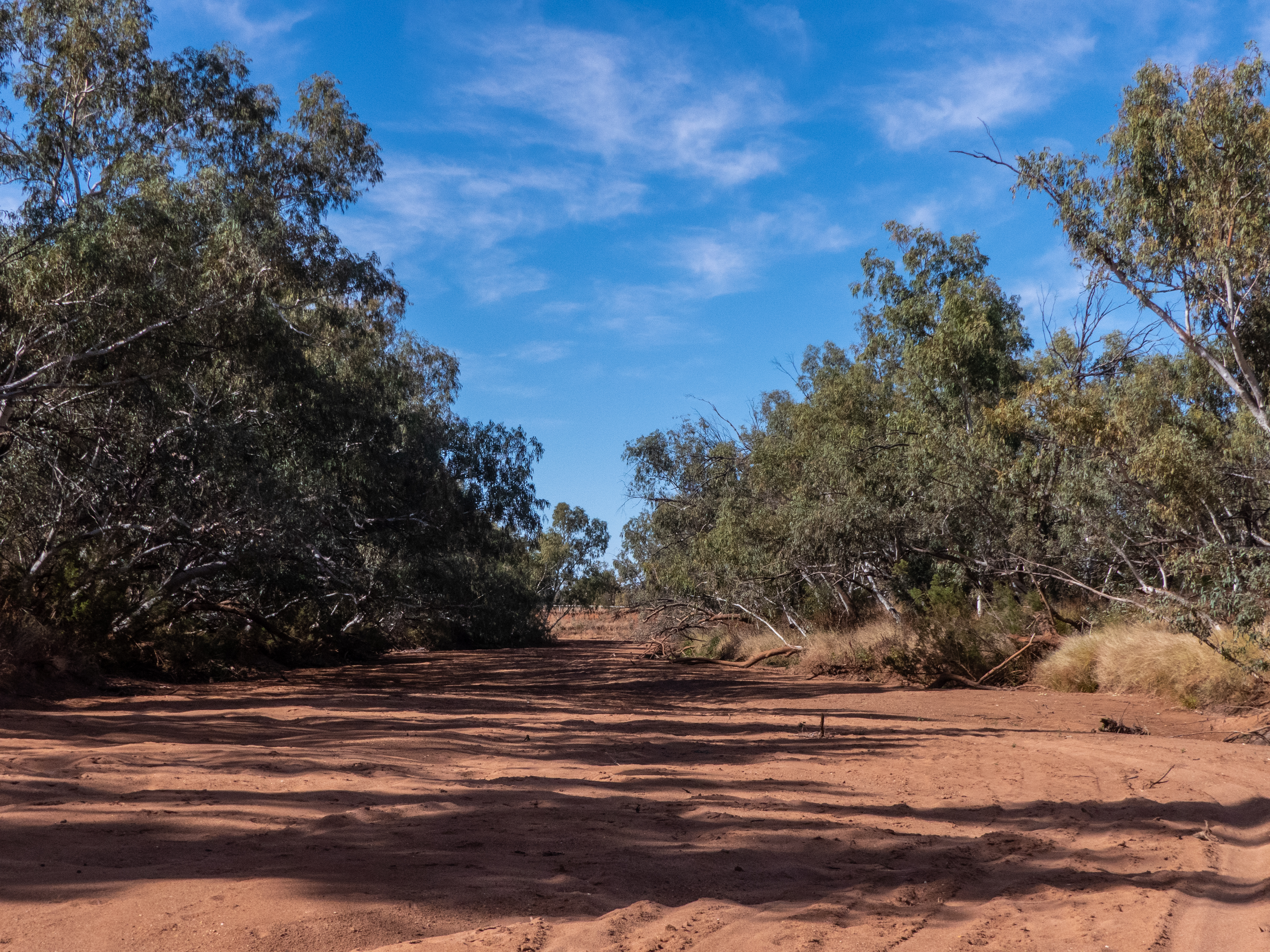
Dry reach of the Burke River near Three Mile camping ground, Boulia.

== See also ==
- List of rivers of Australia
