= Bulloo =

Bulloo may refer to:

Australia

- Bulloo River in South-West Queensland
  - Bulloo-Bancannia drainage basin in Queensland and New South Wales
- Shire of Bulloo, a local government area in Queensland
  - Bulloo Downs, Queensland, a locality in the Shire of Bulloo
- Bulloo Downs Station, a pastoral property in South-West Queensland
- Bulloo Downs Station (Western Australia), a pastoral property in Western Australia
- Electoral district of Bulloo, an electoral district in South-West Queensland
