= Bulloo Developmental Road =

Road in Queensland, Australia

Bulloo Developmental Road Queensland
- Bulloo Developmental Road (green on black)

General information
- Type: Rural road
- Length: 361 km (224 mi)

Major junctions
- East end: A71 Mitchell Highway, Cunnamulla
- West end: Cooper Developmental Road, Durham

Location(s)
- Major settlements: Eulo, Lake Bindegolly National Park, Thargomindah

The Bulloo Developmental Road is an outback road in Queensland, Australia. It is part of the Adventure Way, a route from Brisbane to Adelaide via the Australian outback.

It commences at Cunnamulla and travels approximately west for 361 kilometres (224 mi) until it meets the Cooper Developmental Road at 27.3587°S 142.5718°E.

== Updates ==
=== Widen and seal ===
A project to widen and seal sections of the road, at a cost of $4.5 million, was due to commence in October 2021.

== Locations on the route ==
From east to west:

- Cunnamulla (0 kilometres (0 mi)
- Eulo (67 kilometres (42 mi))
- Lake Bindegolly National Park in Dynevor (153 kilometres (95 mi))
- Thargomindah (197 kilometres (122 mi))

== Major intersections ==
LGA	Location	km	mi	Destinations	Notes
Paroo	Cunnamulla	0	0.0	Mitchell Highway (State Route A71) north – Charleville / east (via Balonne Highway (State Route 49)) St George / south – Bourke	Eastern end of Bulloo Developmental Road. The road proceeds west through Cunnamulla via Emma, Wicks, and Louise Streets.
Warrego River		2.3	1.4	Darby Land Bridge	
Paroo River		70.5	43.8	Bridge	
Paroo	Eulo	73.5	45.7	Hungerford Road – south – Hungerford	
Lake Bindegolly		155	96	Bridge	
Bulloo	Dynevor–Norley boundary	191	119	Quilpie Thargomindah Road – north – Quilpie	Eastern concurrency terminus with the Dowling Track, a series of roads that follows the historic stock route from Bourke to Quilpie via Hungerford and Thargomindah
Bulloo	Dynevor–Thargomindah boundary	196	122	Thargomindah Hungerford Road – south – Hungerford	Western concurrency terminus with the Dowling Track
Wilson River		316	196	Bridge	
Bulloo	Nockatunga	320	200	Warry Gate Road – south – Noccundra, Tibooburra, and Broken Hill	
Bulloo	Nockatunga	327	203	Adventure Way (Innamincka Road) – west – Innamincka	
Bulloo	Durham	361	224	Cooper Developmental Road – east – Quilpie / Woomanooka Road – west – Tanbar	Western end of Bulloo Developmental Road
1.000 mi = 1.609 km; 1.000 km = 0.621 mi: Concurrency terminus

== See also ==
Vincent James Dowling
