= Noccundra Hotel =

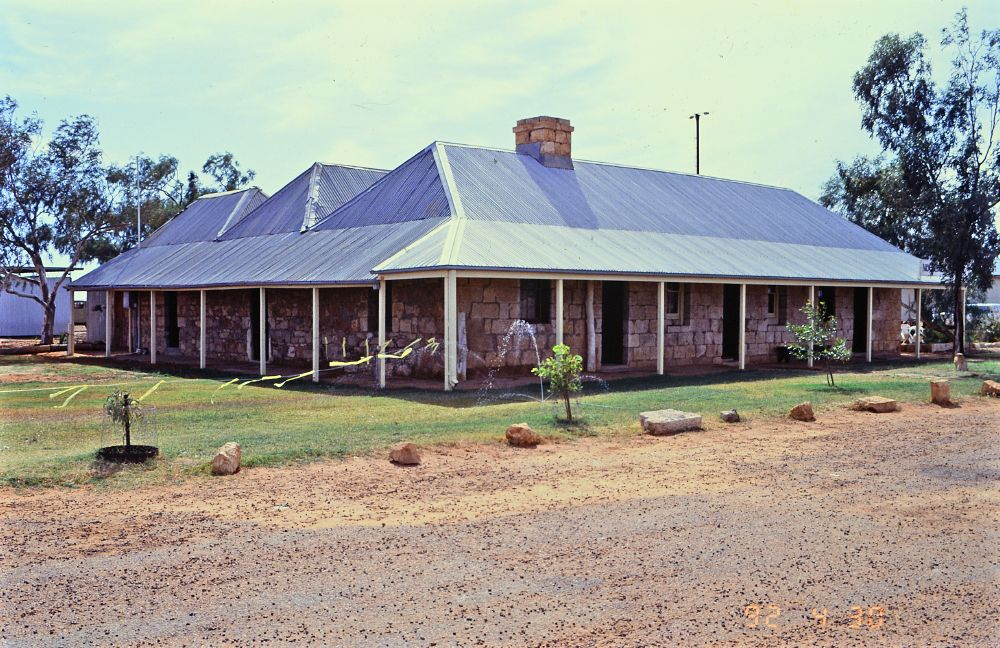
- Noccundra Hotel, 1992

- Location within Queensland
- 27.817°S 142.587°E
- Location: Wilson Street, Noccundra, Nockatunga, Shire of Bulloo, Queensland, Australia

History
- Design period: 1870s–1890s (late 19th century)
- Built: 1880s–1930s

Queensland Heritage Register
- Official name: Noccundra Hotel
- Type: state heritage (built, archaeological)
- Designated: 21 October 1992
- Reference no.: 600361
- Significant period: 1880s–1930s (fabric); 1880s–ongoing (historical use)
- Significant components: shed/s, kitchen/kitchen house

Noccundra Hotel is a heritage-listed hotel at Wilson Street, Noccundra in Nockatunga, Shire of Bulloo, Queensland, Australia. It was built from 1880s to 1930s. It was added to the Queensland Heritage Register on 21 October 1992.

== History ==
The Noccundra Hotel lies approximately 80 kilometres (50 mi) west of Thargomindah on the eastern edge of the Sturt Stony Desert. A hotel was established on this site in the nineteenth century, adjacent to Noccundra Waterhole, on the Wilson River and on the stock and trading routes from South Australia and New South Wales.

The expedition of Burke and Wills through far southwest Queensland in 1860 paved the way for pastoral settlement of the area, with Bulloo Downs Station being the first run to be taken up in 1864. A small township was established on the Bulloo River to service the pastoral properties in the district, and on 31 December 1874 the Thargomindah Town Reserve was proclaimed and soon other small settlements in the area were trading through it. In 1880 Bulloo Division was gazetted, with headquarters at Thargomindah. Bulloo Division had an area of 45,000 square miles, extending north to Windorah and east to Adavale and Toompine.

John Dynan took up Nockatunga Station in the late 1860s and J B Hughes acquired it in 1872. The Noccundra Hotel may have been set up in order to serve this run and the earliest records for the station show amounts paid to the Noccundra hotel. The current building is said locally to have replaced an earlier one, which may have dated from the establishment of Nockatunga, although the first license was granted to James Gardiner (or Gardner) in 1886 and this may have related to a new building. A town reserve was created in 1885 and the future township site of Noccundra was surveyed by James Hood in mid-1889, at which time the only structures there were a hotel with an associated bathhouse, stable and yards on allotments 2 and 3 of section 1 and a store to the west of the hotel owned by James McColl. The two men concerned purchased the blocks from which their businesses were operating at the first land sales in January 1890. These two establishments were well placed, being near a waterhole at the intersection of the stock and trading routes to Innamincka in South Australia and Tibooburra in New South Wales. Trade would have come from teamsters, travellers and staff at Nockatunga at a time when stations had a large workforce and transport to distant towns was impracticable.

The hotel is said to have been constructed of stone from Mount Poole quarry about 200 kilometres (120 mi) away in New South Wales. It is in a style similar to surviving buildings in Birdsville and Boulia which relates more to South Australia than Queensland, a reminder that south west Queensland in this era had better access to, and more trade with, these colonies than it had with Brisbane far to the east. McColl's store was also of stone and was a rectangular structure with several rooms. Photographs from the 1970s when substantial sections of it remained, show that it had coursed stonework and well-detailed windows with stone sills.

The township of Noccundra was first listed in the Queensland Post Office Directory in 1892, at which time William Hogan was the publican of the Noccundra Hotel, having taken over from Gardiner in 1890. In 1894, the license reverted briefly to Gardiner before it passed to Martha Hogan, who was probably William's widow. By this time the town had a constable, though the names in the Post Office Directory suggest that the township was mainly a supply depot and receiving office for several pastoral stations in the vicinity. The publican in 1899 was H L Barber who was soon succeeded as licensee by Catherine Costello who ran the hotel until 1913. McColl continued to operate the store until he died in 1902, after which T.J. Costello became store manager and postmaster. The store was sold to P.J. Leahy & Co Ltd in 1904.

William Richards was the next licensee but in 1916 Henry Hughes purchased both the store and hotel, hiring Samuel Milne to run the store. In the 1920s the tiny township gained a saddler and the Noccundra Hotel was extended by the addition of a kitchen/dining room of corrugated iron sheeting on a timber frame, possibly in the 1930s. However, by 1933 the store had closed and Noccundra was no longer listed in the post office directories. It may be that increased access to motor transport and the growth of Thargomindah as a local centre contributed to the failure of Noccundra to develop as a township. The police station closed in 1959.

Although the township failed, the hotel continued to be important in the area. Situated in a remote area between supply centres the hotel remained a link in outback communications, a service point for travellers and as a focus for community events. It has served as a venue for monthly medical and dental clinics by the Royal Flying Doctor Service (RFDS) and for meetings of a social and racing club that raised funds for the RFDS. It is also a landmark place for tourists. In 1977 the National Trust listed the hotel and photographs taken at that time show the store building to the west of the hotel still had large sections of three walls standing with a lean to addition of corrugated iron on the eastern side. This building was used at one time as a bar for the hotel, allowing the hotel proper to be used for meals and accommodation.

The front and side verandahs of the hotel were almost completely replaced in 1985 and it was sold in 1990 as part of Nockatunga Station. Some refurbishment was carried out in 1991 and again in the late 1990s.

The visible remains of the store have now dwindled to a part of the eastern wall and some footings that have been preserved as part of a garden feature. This area is now lawn and dilutes to some extent the visual starkness of the building in the landscape.

== Description ==
Noccundra is roughly equidistant from the borders of South Australia and New South Wales and is on the road from Thargomindah to the east. The hotel consists of a group of stone and corrugated iron buildings that stand out in their isolation against the flat gibber plain and are seen for a considerable distance when approaching by car.

The main part of the hotel comprises two parallel and linked single storey structures built of coursed sandstone blocks. A smaller stone structure containing a bathroom and laundry is linked at right angles to the northwest corner. All have separate hipped roofs clad in corrugated iron. A corrugated iron awning supported on a timber frame and posts runs along the south and west elevations of the hotel and shades a concrete pathway. At the rear a similar awning runs from the laundry across the width of the building.

The interior of the hotel has ripple iron ceilings. It has a stone double fireplace set between two of the rooms. Internal walls are rendered and painted. There are sash windows in timber frames and some doors now have metal frames.

To the rear of the hotel is a detached kitchen and dining room. This is a gable-roofed building constructed of corrugated iron sheeting over a timber frame with an extension of the same materials to the north. Other small corrugated iron structures are in the grounds.

== Heritage listing ==
Noccundra Hotel was listed on the Queensland Heritage Register on 21 October 1992 having satisfied the following criteria.

The place is important in demonstrating the evolution or pattern of Queensland's history.

The Noccundra Hotel in far southwest Queensland survives as an important link with the establishment of pastoral settlement in this area. As an inn operating in conjunction with a store to serve travellers and surrounding pastoral stations, it illustrates the way in which remote areas were serviced and how many service towns began. While some went on to become important regional centres others, such as Noccundra, failed to develop due to a variety of causes as circumstances changed. The hotel now remains as an indicator of this failed township but retains its role as a way station for travellers.

The place demonstrates rare, uncommon or endangered aspects of Queensland's cultural heritage.

The Noccundra Hotel is a rare surviving late 19th century outback hotel, and has the potential, through physical investigation and documentary research, to reveal important information about the design, form and function of far western Queensland hotel complexes of this period, and about the people who erected such buildings.

The place has potential to yield information that will contribute to an understanding of Queensland's history.

The Noccundra Hotel is a rare surviving late 19th century outback hotel, and has the potential, through physical investigation and documentary research, to reveal important information about the design, form and function of far western Queensland hotel complexes of this period, and about the people who erected such buildings.

The place is important in demonstrating the principal characteristics of a particular class of cultural places.

Although some changes have taken place, the Noccundra Hotel is important in illustrating the principal characteristics of a vernacular style of masonry construction that spread throughout central Australia, across South Australia, the Northern Territory and Queensland in the late 19th century, efficiently controlling the extremes of temperature in the hot, arid interior of the continent, and compensating for the lack of locally available timber.

The place is important because of its aesthetic significance.

The Noccundra Hotel has aesthetic appeal, derived partly from its form and materials and partly from its setting as an isolated vernacular structure in a broad, open plain.

The place has a strong or special association with a particular community or cultural group for social, cultural or spiritual reasons.

The Noccundra Hotel is important for its long connection with the community of the surrounding area as a venue for many social events.
