= Dynevor, Queensland =

Dynevor Queensland
- Coordinates: 28.2094°S 144.1983°E
- Population: 21 (2016 census)
  - Density: 0.00365/km^{2} (0.00944/sq mi)
- Postcode(s): 4492
- Area: 5,758.9 km^{2} (2,223.5 sq mi)
- Time zone: AEST (UTC+10:00)
- Location: 85.9 km (53 mi) SE of Thargomindah; 179 km (111 mi) W of Cunnamulla; 472 km (293 mi) W of St George; 839 km (521 mi) W of Toowoomba; 969 km (602 mi) W of Brisbane
- LGA(s): Shire of Bulloo
- State electorate(s): Warrego
- Federal division(s): Maranoa
Suburbs around Dynevor:
Thargomindah	Norley	Yowah
Bullawarra	Dynevor	Eulo
Buloo Downs	Hungerford	Hungerford

Dynevor is a former locality in the Shire of Bulloo, Queensland, Australia. In the 2016 census, Dynevor had a population of 21 people.

On 17 April 2020, the Queensland Government reorganised the nine localities in the Shire of Bulloo, resulting in six localities. This included discontinuing Dynevor, incorporating its land into an enlarged locality of Thargomindah.

== Geography ==
Dynevor was in the Channel Country. It was arid land, mostly flat and approximately 150 metres above sea level. Although there was a network of mostly unnamed creeks through the locality, these were usually dry creek beds. An area of higher land (about 200 metres above sea level) ran north to south through the locality, resulting in the creeks in the west of the locality forming part of the Bulloo River drainage basin and in the east of the locality forming part of the Paroo River drainage basin.

The land was predominantly leased for pastoral purposes, the northern part of the locality being the Dynevor Downs pastoral lease (and presumably the source of the locality name). The north-west part of the locality contained the entire Lake Bindegolly National Park while a portion of the Currawinya National Park could be found in the north-east although the bulk of that national park was in adjacent Hungerford.

The Cunnamulla Road (also known as the Bulloo Developmental Road and the Adventure Way) from Thargomindah to Cunnamulla passed from west to east through the northern part of the locality. The Hungerford Road from Thargomindah to Hungerford passed from north to south through the western part of the locality.

There was no town in the locality but the town of Thargomindah was only 1 km from the locality's north-west boundary and the town of Yowah was 4 km from the locality's north-east boundary. The Dynevor Downs Homestead is located on the Cunnamulla Road (28.0960°S 144.3648°E) and has the Dynevor Downs Airport (ICAO: YDNV) with three runways (north-south, east-west, and NE-SW), the longest being 1050 metres, the others being about 800 metres.

== History ==
Margany (also known as Marganj, Mardigan, Marukanji, Maranganji) is an Australian Aboriginal language spoken by the Margany people. The Margany language region includes the landscape within the local government boundaries of the Quilpie Shire, taking in Quilpie, Cheepie and Beechal extending towards Eulo and Thargomindah, as well as the properties of Dynevor Downs and Ardoch.

In the 2016 census, Dynevor had a population of 21 people.
