= Bullawarra =

- Suburb
- Coordinates: 27.9922°S 143.3322°E
- Country: Australia
- State: Queensland
- LGA: Shire of Bulloo
- Location: 34.1 km (21.2 mi) WSW of Thargomindah; 232 km (144 mi) W of Cunnamulla; 525 km (326 mi) W of St George; 892 km (554 mi) W of Toowoomba; 1,022 km (635 mi) W of Brisbane

Government
  - State electorate: Warrego
  - Federal division: Maranoa

Area
  - Total: 5,088.4 km^{2} (1,964.6 sq mi)

Population
  - Total: 5 (2016 census)
  - Density: 0.00098/km^{2} (0.00254/sq mi)
- Time zone: UTC+10:00 (AEST)
- Postcode: 4492
Suburbs around Bullawarra
Nockatunga	Nockatunga	Norley
Nockatunga	Bullawarra	Dynevor
Bulloo Downs	Bulloo Downs	Bulloo Downs

Bullawarra is a former locality in the Shire of Bulloo, Queensland, Australia. In the 2016 census, Bullawarra had a population of 5 people.

On 17 April 2020, the Queensland Government reorganised the nine localities in the Shire of Bulloo, resulting in six localities. This included discontinuing the locality of Bullawarra by absorbing most of its land into Thargomindah except for a small portion in the south of Bullawarra which was absorbed into Bulloo Downs.

== Geography ==
The Bundeena Road passed east to west through the north of the locality. The Bulloo River flowed through the locality from east to south.

Bullawarra was part of the Channel Country where the rivers are mostly dry riverbeds except for seasonal flooding. The land was principally used for low density cattle grazing.

Lake Bullawarra was the east of the locality (27.8898°S 143.5993°E) and is a nationally important wetland. It is a habitat for a vulnerable species, the Major Mitchell's cockatoo.

== History ==
In the 2016 census, Bullawarra had a population of 5 people.

On 17 April 2020 the Queensland Government reorganised the nine localities in the Shire of Bulloo, resulting in six localities. This included discontinuing the locality of Bullawarra by absorbing most of its land into Thargomindah except for a small portion in the south of Bullawarra which was absorbed into Bulloo Downs.

== Education ==
There were no schools in Bullawarra. The nearest government primary school was Thargomindah State School and the nearest government secondary school was Cunnamulla P-12 State School.
