= Dr Ludwig Becker's Grave =

- Location within Queensland
- 28.321°S 143.1241°E
- Location: Molesworth Station, by the Bulloo River, Bullo Downs, Shire of Bulloo, Queensland, Australia

History
- Design period: 1840s–1860s (mid-19th century)
- Built: April 1861

Queensland Heritage Register
- Official name: Dr Ludwig Becker's Grave
- Type: state heritage (built)
- Designated: 5 August 1994
- Reference no.: 601359
- Significant period: 1860s (historical, fabric); 1860s– (social)
- Significant components: burial/grave, grave surrounds/railings, plaque

Dr Ludwig Becker's Grave is a heritage-listed grave at Molesworth Station, by the Bulloo River, Bulloo Downs, Shire of Bulloo, Queensland, Australia. He was buried in 1861. It was added to the Queensland Heritage Register on 5 August 1994.

== History ==
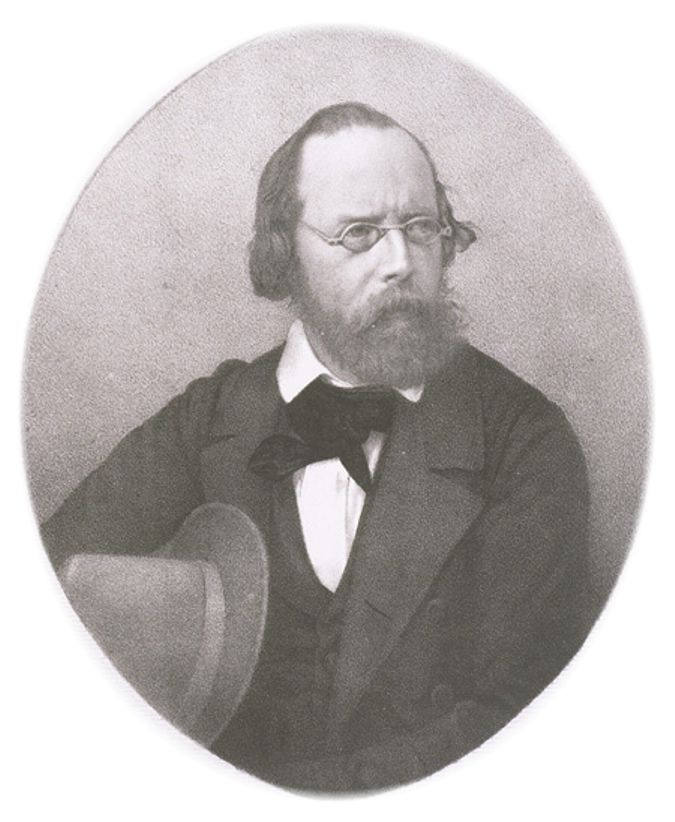
Ludwig Becker, an 1861 memorial lithograph by fellow German Club member, Frederick Schonfeld

Doctor Ludwig Becker, a member of the Burke and Wills expedition, died en route on 29 April 1861. His grave, together with those of William Purcell and Charles Stone, is located on a stock route along the western bank of Kooliatto Waterhole on the Bulloo River.

Becker was born at Darmstadt, Germany in 1808. He achieved a Doctorate of Philosophy and left Germany for political reasons during the 1848 revolution. After some time in Rio de Janeiro he arrived at Launceston, Tasmania in 1851. He was described by Lady Denison as:

one of those universal geniuses who can do anything...a very good naturalist, geologist...draws and plays and sings, conjures and ventriloquises and imitates the notes of birds so accurately

In 1852–54, while gold digging in Bendigo, Victoria, Becker made meteorological observations and produced sketches which he exhibited in Melbourne in April 1854. He became a council member of the Victorian Society of Fine Arts in 1856 and of the Philosophical Institute of Victoria in 1859, and was a leading member of the German Club. He corresponded with ornithologist and zoologist John Gould, known as the father of bird study in Australia, on the lyrebird, and was one of the first to try to raise a lyrebird chick and sent sketches of the egg to ornithologists in Germany and France.

His scientific knowledge and artistic ability qualified him for selection as a member of the Victorian Exploring Expedition in 1860–61, which has since become known as the Burke and Wills expedition. It was organised by the Philosophical Institute which in 1860 became the Royal Society of Victoria.

The Burke and Wills expedition was led by Robert O'Hara Burke, who was a superintendent of police in the Castlemaine district when, in 1860, he was given leave to take command of the exploring expedition to cross the continent from south to north.

The objectives of the expedition were hazy and its route, from Cooper's Creek to the Gulf of Carpentaria, was decided less than a month before it set out. Burke's instructions, sent after him because they were not ready at the time, were incoherent. The real object of the expedition appears to have been to snatch from the South Australian explorer, John McDouall Stuart, the honour of making the first south–north crossing of the continent. Sir Henry Barkly, Governor of Victoria 1856–1863, described it as the glorious race across the continent between the expeditions fitted out in this and the adjacent colony of South Australia.

The Burke and Wills expedition was the most expensive in the history of Australian exploration. It cost over £60,000 and seven lives. Burke was the first Australian explorer to be provided with camels, over two dozen of them, imported complete with cameleers. There were horses and wagons, food for two years and lavish equipment. The party consisted of three officers; Burke, George James Landells the camelmaster, and William John Wills surveyor and meteorologist; German scientific officers Ludwig Becker artist, naturalist and geologist, and Herman Beckler medical officer and botanist; a foreman, nine assistants and the camel-drivers.

The expedition left Melbourne on 20 August 1860 and made progress through the settled districts to Swan Hill and Balranald and reached Menindee on the Darling River at the beginning of October. Burke was in haste and left much of his provisions at Balranald and more at Menindee.

Becker, as artist, naturalist and geologist on a salary of £300, received lengthy instructions from Doctor John Macadam, honorary secretary of the Exploration Committee, which stipulated that he should collect specimens, keep a diary and produce daily maps with illustrations and sections. He sent his first dispatches from Swan Hill, and from Menindie sent a number of specimens. He became despondent when these were not acknowledged.

Burke became impatient with the lost time in making scientific investigations and ordered that Becker and Beckler give up their investigations and work like the rest of the men and walk instead of ride. In a report to the Exploration Committee, Landells wrote that Burke requested him not to allow Becker to ride and had observed that if Becker accompanied the expedition, and got through, people would say that it would not be difficult to cross to the Gulf of Carpentaria, and that he was to be walked until he gave in. At one stage Becker did not eat for three days and became faint. He had to wait until everyone was asleep to do his writing and sketching.

After quarrelling with Burke, Landells resigned at Menindee and Burke promoted Wills to second in command, replacing him as third officer by a local man, William Wright, who proved incompetent and unreliable.

Burke's orders were that his base camp was to be at Cooper's Creek; instead, he divided his party, transport and provisions, dashing on to Cooper's Creek with an advance party and ordering Wright to follow with as little delay as possible. However, Wright waited in Menindee for three months - by which time Burke had travelled to the Gulf of Carpentaria and back - before transporting the vital reserve transport and provisions the 400 miles (640 km) to Cooper's Creek.

Becker was with Wright's party in Menindee, and frustrated due to the lack of communication from the Exploration Committee he no longer wrote his daily reports and concentrated instead on sketching. He became aware of the possible failure of the expedition, but his letter to the committee about the delays was ignored.

Art work "Border of the Mud-Desert near Desolation Camp" at Rat Point, by Ludwig Becker, 1861

Wright's party moved north at the end of January 1861, and reached Torowoto, about halfway from Menindee to Cooper's Creek on 12 February. By this time Becker and others were suffering from scurvy and the effects of bad water. At their camp at Rat Point, Becker and William Purcell, the cook, were very ill. Wright moved on to try to reach Cooper's Creek, but only made it to Bulloo and returned. Beckler remained with the sick members, and on 8 April wrote to his brother of Becker's illness and the unlikelihood of his recovery, stating that "I shall have to bury him here, and then what an outcry there will be for me in Melbourne!" Wright wanted to send the sick men back to Menindee, but Beckler told him that they could not make a single day's journey. Wright then ordered the party on to Bulloo, which they reached on 21 April. Wright's party never continued onto Cooper's Creek.

Meanwhile, Burke, impatient for Wright's arrival at Cooper's Creek, selected Wills, King and Gray to accompany him to the gulf and left four men under the command of William Brahe, one of the assistants, at camp LXV at Cooper's Creek. Burke decided to explore on foot and took provisions for twelve weeks and six camels and a horse as pack animals. It took four months to complete the 1,500 miles (2,400 km), and Gray died before they returned to camp LXV at Cooper's Creek. When Burke's party reached camp LXV on 21 April 1861, spent, starving and in rags, they found it deserted. Brahe's party, having given up hope of seeing Burke and Wills, had left that day for Menindee with six camels, twelve horses, all the clothes and most of the food. Burke decided that as they were in bad shape and had only two camels, they would not be able to catch Brahe's party and would not survive the 400-mile (640 km) journey. He decided to make for Mount Hopeless, a 150-mile (240 km) journey away, leaving a message of their intentions at camp LXV.

Bulla or Koorliatto : view from the camp up and down the Creek, by Hermann Beckler, 1861 - this is the camp where Becker, Stone & Purcell died and were buried

Brahe's party arrived at Wright's camp at Bulloo on 28 April. The natives were hostile, and had attacked the camp on 27 April. During this period, Becker was mostly unconscious and died on 29 April, and was buried near the graves of William Purcell and Charles Stone who had died a few days earlier. The Royal Commission to enquire into the causes of the deaths of Burke and Wills also found, from Dr Beckler's evidence, that Dr Becker died of dysentery and the exhaustion consequent upon it; of course with some peculiar symptoms, which were principally owing to the affection of scurvy. After his burial, Becker's clothes, bedding and tent were burned and his other effects were placed in a pack for conveyance to Melbourne.

Brahe decided to return to camp LXV at Cooper's Creek, to wait for Burke and Wills, which he reached fifteen days after he had left it. He did not find Burke's message and left again for Menindee for good. Burke, Wills and King, heading for Mount Hopeless, were too weak to get far. Only King survived, by living with the Aboriginals and sharing their food after Burke and Wills had died, and was rescued by Alfred William Howitt's search party from Melbourne in September 1861.

A royal commission appointed to inquire into the deaths of Burke and Wills censured Burke for having dividing his party at Menindee; and for entrusting Wright, of whom he knew little, with an important command; and for having shown more zeal than prudence in leaving Cooper's Creek before the arrival of Wright; and for undertaking the journey to the gulf with inadequate provisions.

Burke kept no journal: there was no time for scientific observation, and Burke's route was only practicable in unusual weather. Burke won the race to the north, but John McDouall Stuart found the all-weather route. Solid gains in geographical knowledge were made by the explorers Howitt, John McKinlay and William Landsborough who led parties in search of him.

Becker had made meteorological observations daily until a month before he died. His death was lamented in newspapers and journals, both in the Australian Colonies and in Germany, and he was mourned by colleagues at the Royal Society. Governor Barkly paid tribute to one of the earliest and most indefatigable contributors:

...the name of Ludwig Becker will...rank with those of Cunningham, Kennedy and Leichhardt and the rest of that noble band who have sacrificed their lives in the cause of science

The City of Ballarat commemorated the expedition with a clock tower in 1863 referring to the deaths of The Victorian Explorers Burke, Wills, Gray and Becker. The small Queensland parish of Becker perpetuates his name and some timber posts mark his grave.

This expedition paved the way for settlement in the area, with the first recorded settlement being Bulloo Downs Station taken up by Jones, Sullivan and Molesworth Green in 1864.

== Description ==
Dr Ludwig Becker's grave, with the graves of William Purcell and Charles Stone, is located on a stock route along the western bank of Kooliatto Waterhole on the Bulloo River near Molesworth Station southwest of Thargomindah.

The gravesite, marked by a plinth with a plaque and three timber posts, is surrounded by a low metal fence.

== Heritage listing ==
Dr Ludwig Becker's Grave was listed on the Queensland Heritage Register on 5 August 1994 having satisfied the following criteria.

The place is important in demonstrating the evolution or pattern of Queensland's history.

Dr Ludwig Becker, artist, explorer and naturalist, has been described as very dedicated to science and art. He was an integral member of the Australian exploring expeditions.

The place has a special association with the life or work of a particular person, group or organisation of importance in Queensland's history.

His grave and its location are both a memorial to his life and to the Burke and Wills Expedition.
