= Bulloo Downs =

Bulloo Downs may refer to:

- Bulloo Downs, Queensland, a locality in the Shire of Bulloo, Queensland, Australia
- Bulloo Downs Station, a pastoral station in Queensland, Australia
- Bulloo Downs Station (Western Australia), a pastoral station in Western Australia
