= Ludwig Becker (explorer) =

German artist, explorer and naturalist (1808–1861)

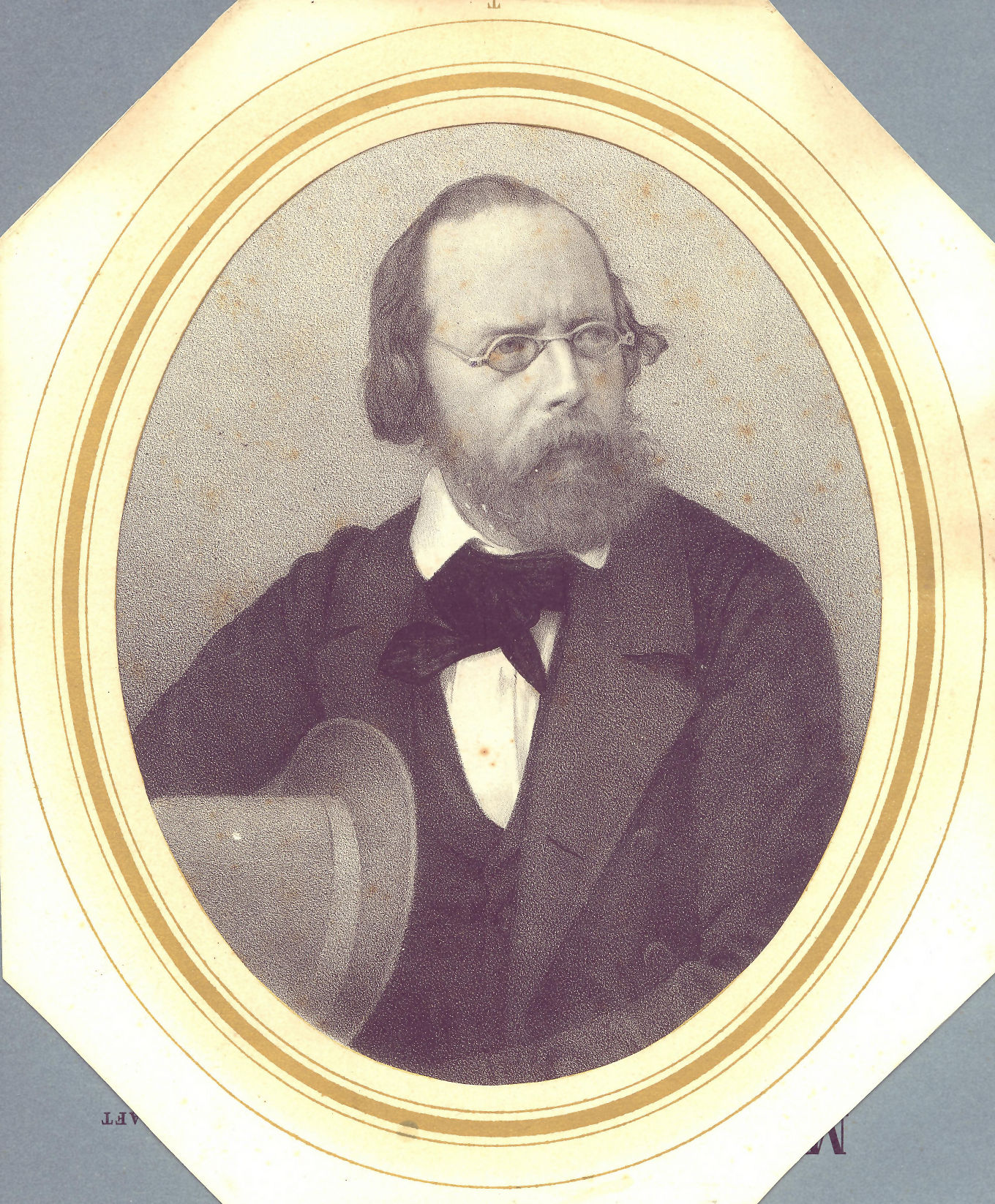
Ludwig Becker, by Frederick Schoenfeld

Ludwig Phillip Heinrich Becker (5 or 9 September 1808 – 27 April 1861) was a German artist, explorer and naturalist. He was born in Rödelheim near Frankfurt am Main. He moved to Australia in 1850, and was a member of the ill-fated Burke and Wills expedition. He died at the expedition's camp on the western bank of Koorliatto Waterhole, Bulloo River in 1861.

== Early years ==
Becker was born at Rödelheim near Frankfurt am Main, Germany, in 1808 to Ernst Friedrich Becker (1750–1826) and Amöne Eleonore Weber (1782–1819). Becker was the eldest of five children from this marriage. After his mother's death, Becker's father married Johanette Christiane Weber, a younger sister of his first wife. They had three more children.

Becker left Germany in 1850. As was common practice at the time, he was referred to as Dr. Becker, but had not studied at a university.

== Australia ==
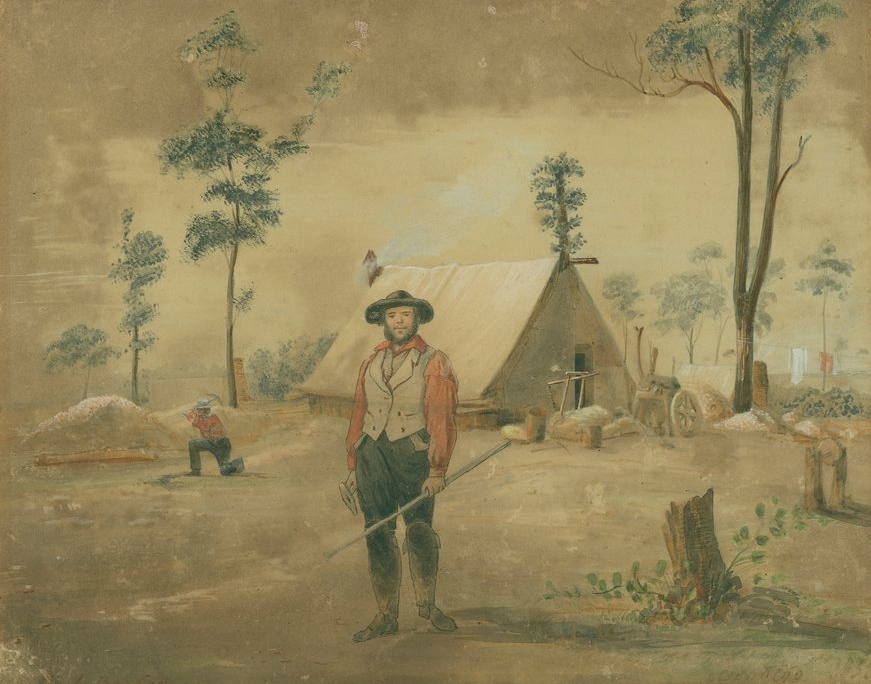
Bendigo by Ludwig Becker, 1853 watercolour

After some time in England he travelled from Liverpool in November 1850 on the ship Hannah via Pernambuco, Brazil, and arrived in Launceston, Van Diemen's Land, in early 1851. He was described by Lady Denison as "one of those universal geniuses who can do anything ... a very good naturalist, geologist ... draws and plays and sings, conjures and ventriloquises and imitates the notes of birds so accurately". From 1852 until 1854, while mining for gold in Bendigo, Becker made meteorological observations and produced sketches which he exhibited in Melbourne in April 1854. He became a council member of the Victorian Society of Fine Arts in 1856 and of the Philosophical Institute of Victoria in 1859, and was a leading member of the German Club. He corresponded with ornithologist and zoologist John Gould, known as the father of bird study in Australia, on the lyrebird, and was one of the first to try to raise a lyrebird chick and sent sketches of the egg to ornithologists in Germany and France.

He illustrated botanical works for Ferdinand von Mueller including Fragmenta phytographiae Australiae (1858–82) and The Plants Indigenous to the Colony of Victoria (1860–65).

== Burke and Wills expedition ==
His scientific knowledge and artistic ability qualified him for selection as a member of the Victorian Exploring Expedition in 1860–61, which has since become known as the Burke and Wills expedition.

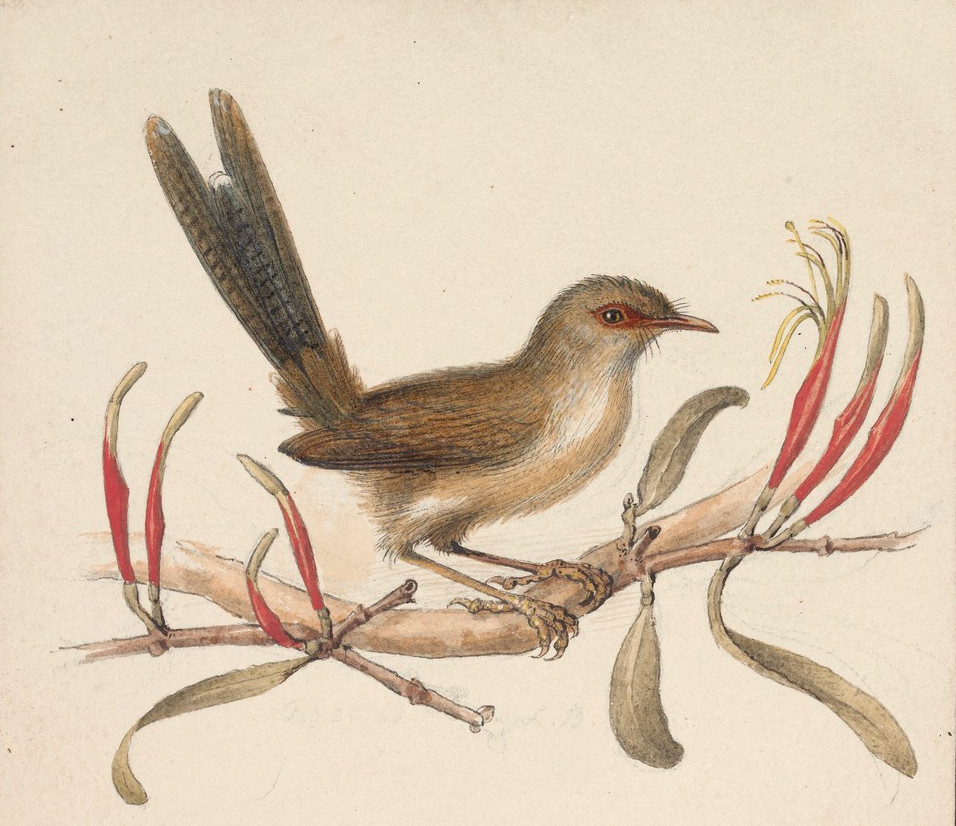
Purple backed wren or fly catcher. (Detail)

Becker, as artist, naturalist and geologist on a salary of £300, received lengthy instructions from Doctor John Macadam, honorary secretary of the Exploration Committee, which stipulated that he should collect specimens, keep a diary and produce daily maps with illustrations and sections. He sent his first dispatches from Swan Hill, and from Menindee sent a number of specimens. He became despondent when these were not acknowledged.

Burke became impatient with the time lost in making scientific investigations and ordered Becker to cease his investigations and work like the rest of the men and walk instead of ride. In a report to the Exploration Committee, George James Landells, Burke's second-in-command, wrote that Burke requested him not to allow Becker to ride and had observed that if Becker accompanied the expedition, and got through, people would say that it would not be difficult to cross to the Gulf of Carpentaria, and that he was to be walked until he gave in. At one stage Becker did not eat for three days and became faint. He had to wait until everyone was asleep to do his writing and sketching.

Frustrated by the lack of communication from the Exploration Committee, Becker no longer wrote his daily reports and concentrated instead on sketching. He became aware of the possible failure of the expedition, but his letter to the committee about the delays was ignored.

By February 1861, Becker and others were suffering from scurvy and the effects of bad water. Towards the end of April, Becker became unconscious and died on 27 April. He was buried near the graves of William Purcell and Charles Stone who had died a few days earlier. The Commission of Enquiry into the causes of the deaths of Burke and Wills also found from the expedition's surgeon, Dr Hermann Beckler's evidence, that Becker died of dysentery and the exhaustion consequent upon it; of course with some peculiar symptoms, which were principally owing to the scurvy. After his burial, Becker's clothes, bedding and tent were burned and his other effects were placed in a pack for conveyance to Melbourne.

Becker had made meteorological observations daily until a month before he died. His death was lamented in newspapers and journals both in the Australian colonies and in Germany, and he was mourned by colleagues at the Royal Society. Governor Barkly paid tribute to "one of the earliest and most indefatigable contributors ... the name of Ludwig Becker will ... rank with those of Cunningham, Kennedy and Leichhardt and the rest of that noble band who have sacrificed their lives in the cause of science." The City of Ballarat commemorated the expedition with a clock tower in 1863 referring to the deaths of "The Victorian Explorers Burke, Wills, Gray and Becker". The small Queensland parish of Becker in Bulloo Downs perpetuates his name and some timber posts mark his grave.

== Legacy ==
This expedition paved the way for settlement in the area, with the first recorded settlement being Bulloo Downs taken up by Jones, Sullivan and Molesworth Green in 1864.

Dr Ludwig Becker's Grave is listed on the Queensland Heritage Register.
