= Cameron Corner =

Cameron Corner is the geodetic point at which the Australian states of Queensland, New South Wales and South Australia meet.

- Cameron Corner, Queensland, the locality immediately north-east of the geodetic point
- Cameron Corner Survey Marker, the heritage-listed survey mark at the geodetic point
