= Norley, Queensland =

Norley Queensland
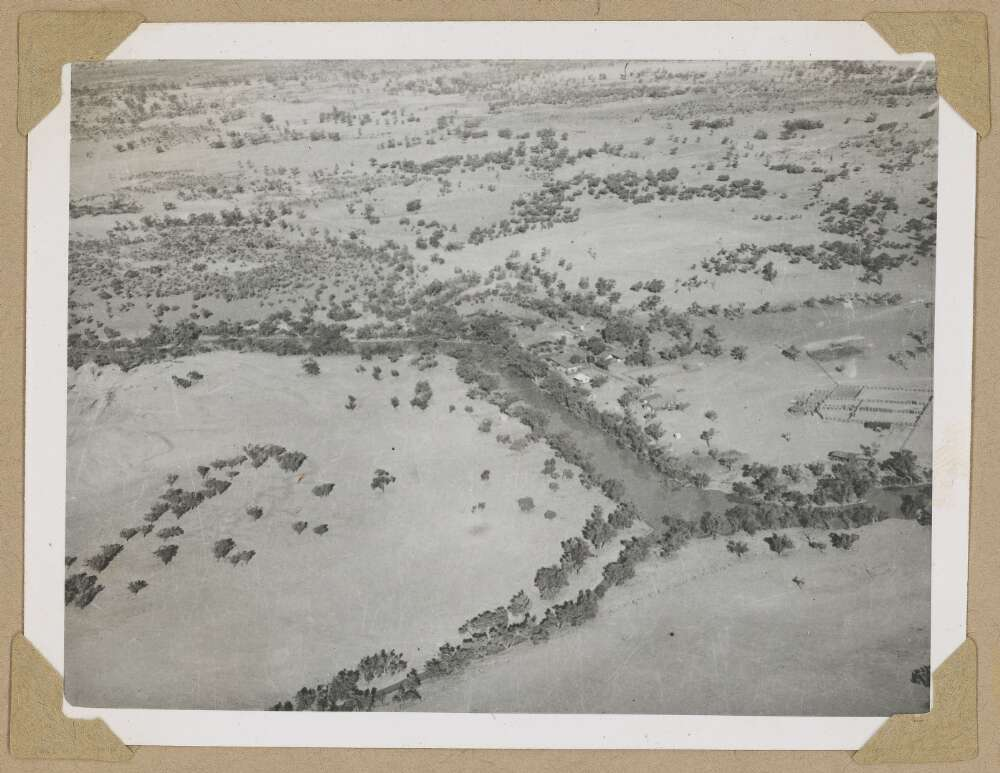
- Aerial view of Norley Station, June 1946

- Coordinates: 27.6865°S 143.7523°E
- Population: 0 (2016 census)
  - Density: 0.00000/km^{2} (0.00000/sq mi)
- Postcode(s): 4492
- Area: 4,449.0 km^{2} (1,717.8 sq mi)
- Time zone: AEST (UTC+10:00)
- Location: 47.9 km (30 mi) S of Thargomindah; 245 km (152 mi) WNW of Cunnamulla; 538 km (334 mi) W of St George; 904 km (562 mi) W of Toowoomba; 1,035 km (643 mi) W of Brisbane
- LGA(s): Shire of Bulloo
- State electorate(s): Warrego
- Federal division(s): Maranoa
Suburbs around Norley:
Eromanga	Quilpie	Quilpie
Nockatunga	Norley	Yowah
Bullawarra	Thargomindah	Dynevor

Norley is a former locality in the Shire of Bulloo, Queensland, Australia. In the 2016 census, Norley had "no people or a very low population".

On 17 April 2020, the Queensland Government reorganised the nine localities in the Shire, resulting in six localities. This included the discontinuation of Norley, absorbing all of its land into an enlarged Thargomindah.

== Geography ==
Norley was part of the Channel Country, a network of interconnecting creeks and rivers that are normally dry except during seasonal flooding. The land was used for low density cattle grazing.

The Bundeena Road entered the locality from the west and exited to the south to neighbouring Thargomindah. The Quilpie Thargomindah Road entered the locality from the north-east and exited to the south to Thargomindah.

== History ==
The locality of Norley took its name from its county and parish of the same name. The county name takes its name in turn from the Norley pastoral station.

In the 2016 census, Norley had "no people or a very low population".

On 17 April 2020, the Queensland Government reorganised the nine localities in the Shire, resulting in six localities. This included the discontinuation of Norley, absorbing all of its land into an enlarged Thargomindah.
