= IOR =

IOR may refer to:

== Organisations ==
- Independent Order of Rechabites, promoting alcohol abstinence
- I.O.R. (Întreprinderea Optică Română), optics company of Romania
- IOR (formerly Inland Oil Refiners), owner of the Eromanga Refinery in Australia
- Institute for the Works of Religion, a Vatican financial institution
- Institute of Refrigeration, a UK scientific charity and membership organisation

== Science and technology ==
- Inclusive or, in logic
- Index of refraction, in optics
- Inhibition of return, a phenomenon in visual perception
- Interoperable Object Reference, a reference to a CORBA or RMI-IIOP object

== Other uses ==
- Importer of record, in import and export
- India Office Records, of the former administration of India
- International Offshore Rule, an early handicapping system for yacht racing
- Istituto per le Opere di Religione (Institute for Religious Works), the "Vatican Bank"
- Inishmore Aerodrome (IATA airport code), Ireland

== See also ==
- Indian Ocean Rim Association (IORA)
