= Cameron Corner, Queensland =

Cameron Corner
- Suburb
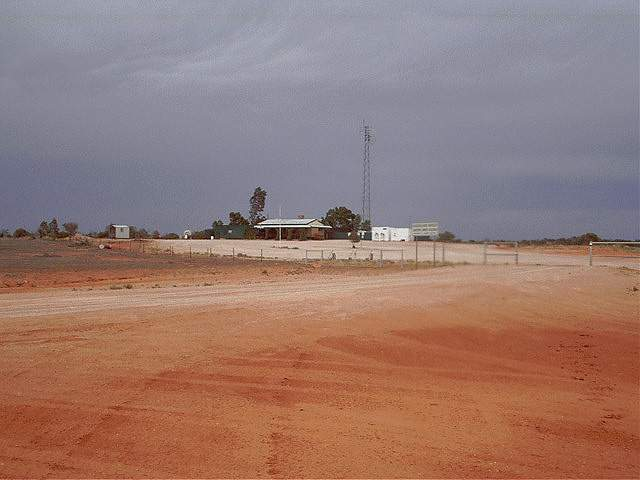
- Cameron Corner, 2001

- Interactive map of Cameron Corner
- Coordinates: 28.5154°S 141.5292°E
- Country: Australia
- State: Queensland
- LGA: Bulloo Shire
- Location: 361 km (224 mi) WSW of Thargomindah; 536 km (333 mi) N of Broken Hill; 886 km (551 mi) E of Coober Pedy; 1,051 km (653 mi) NNE of Adelaide; 1,326 km (824 mi) W of Brisbane

Government
  - State electorate: Warrego
  - Federal division: Maranoa

Area
  - Total: 12,866.0 km^{2} (4,967.6 sq mi)
- Elevation: 112 m (367 ft)

Population
  - Total: 19 (2021 census)
  - Density: 0.00148/km^{2} (0.00382/sq mi)
- Time zone: UTC+10:00 (AEST)
- Postcode: 4492
- County: Carruthers
Suburbs around Cameron Corner
Innamincka (SA)	Durham	Noccundra
Bollards Lagoon (SA)	Cameron Corner	Bulloo Downs
Bollards Lagoon (SA)	Tibooburra (NSW)	Tibooburra (NSW)

Cameron Corner is the point in the outback of eastern Australia where the boundary lines of the states of Queensland, South Australia, and New South Wales meet. It is also the name of an outback locality in the Shire of Bulloo, Queensland, which lies north-east of the "corner" with the Queensland border with New South Wales to the south and the Queensland border with South Australia to the west. In the 2021 census, Cameron Corner had a population of 19 people.

== Geography ==
Cameron Corner is located about 1,400 kilometres (870 mi) west-southwest of Brisbane, Queensland and is the point in the outback of eastern Australia where the boundary lines of the states of Queensland, South Australia, and New South Wales meet (the area immediately to the north and east of the intersection of the state boundaries). The noted Dingo Fence passes through Cameron Corner along the New South Wales border.

The locality of Cameron Corner has the following mountains (from north to south):

- Mount Intrepid (28.7407°S 142.1026°E) 205 metres (673 ft)
- Mount Morris (28.8064°S 142.0623°E) 202 metres (663 ft)
- Mount Bygrave (28.9528°S 142.0546°E) 243 metres (797 ft)

== History ==
Australia map with named state corners

This general area, which includes Sturt Stony Desert in the Lake Eyre Basin, was first explored by Captain Charles Sturt, who in 1844 went in search of a supposed inland sea in the centre of Australia.

The corner and locality are named for the surveyor, John Brewer Cameron, from the New South Wales Lands Department, who spent two years during 1880–1882 marking the border between New South Wales and Queensland. Cameron erected a post there in September 1880 to mark its intersection with the border of South Australia. He placed a wooden marker every 1 mile (1.6 km) eastwards along the interstate boundary.

On 28 January 1919, the Queensland Government placed restrictions on the border crossing at Wompah Gate (29.00000°S 142.17378°E) to prevent the spread of the Spanish flu into Queensland, which were enforced by the Queensland Police. A medical screening process was used to determine if Queensland residents could safely return to the state.

On 17 April 2020, the Queensland Government reorganised the nine localities in the Shire of Bulloo, resulting in six localities. It included Cameron Corner gaining a small portion of land from the west of the locality of Bulloo Downs. It increased the area of the locality of Cameron Corner from 12,866.0 square kilometres (4,967.6 sq mi) to 14,554.8 square kilometres (5,619.6 sq mi).

== Demographics ==
In the 2016 census, Cameron Corner had "no people or a very low population".

In the 2021 census, Cameron Corner had a population of 19 people.

== Heritage listings ==
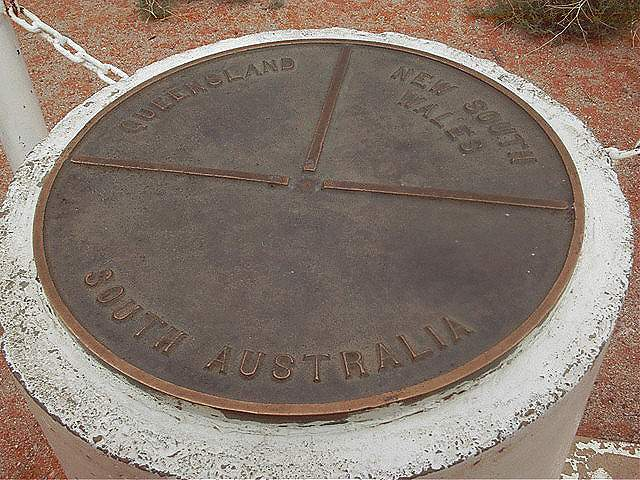
Cameron Corner Marker: Queensland, New South Wales and South Australia

The Cameron Corner Survey Marker (28.9991°S 140.9993°E) marks the corner and was listed on the Queensland Heritage Register in 2012.

== Dingo Fence ==
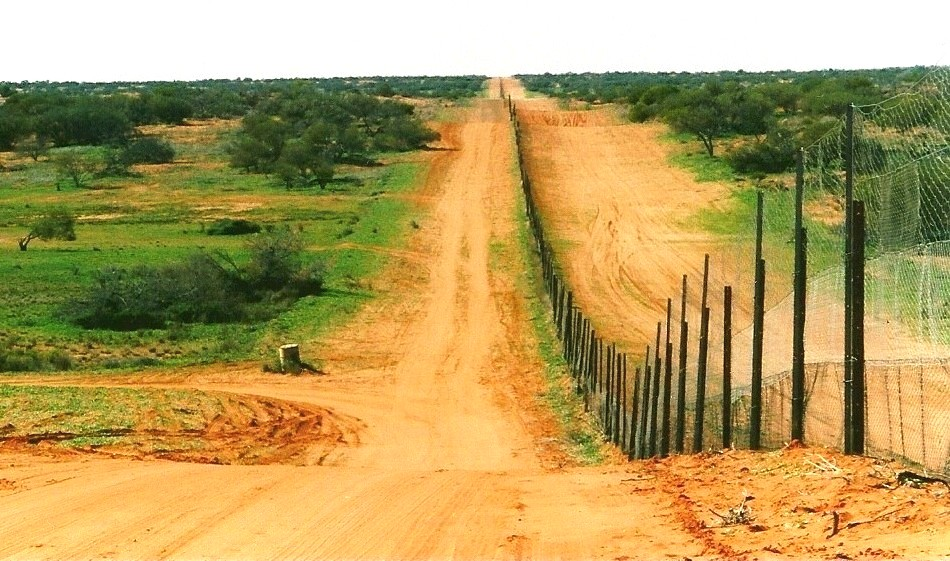
Dingo Fence on the 29th parallel of latitude. Sturt National Park (right of fence) – looking east from Cameron Corner after a heavy rainfall

The 2,500 km (1,553 mi) section of the Dingo Fence in Queensland is also known as the Great Barrier Fence or Wild Dog Barrier Fence 11. It is administered by the Department of Agriculture and Fisheries. The Wild Dog Barrier Fence staff consists of 23 employees, including two-person teams that patrol a 300 km (186 mi) section of the fence once every week. There are depots at Quilpie and Roma.

The Queensland Border Fence stretches for 394 km (245 mi) westwards along the border with New South Wales, into the Strzelecki Desert. The fence passes the point where the three states of Queensland, New South Wales and South Australia meet (Cameron Corner). At this point, it connects with the South Australian Border Fence, which runs for 257 km (160 mi) southwards along the border with New South Wales. It then joins a section known as the Dog Fence in South Australia, which is 2,225 km (1,383 mi) long.

== Homesteads ==
There are a number of homesteads in the locality, including (from north to south):

- Orientos (28.0720°S 141.5315°E)
- Tennappera (28.0796°S 141.8711°E)
- Epsilon (28.2974°S 141.2067°E)
- Santos (28.3298°S 141.5096°E)
- Naryilco (28.5603°S 141.9143°E)
- Omicron (28.7701°S 141.2411°E)

== Events ==
Cameron Corner in the intersection of Australian time zones during daylight-saving

New Year's Eve is celebrated three times each year in Cameron Corner (also in Poeppel Corner and Surveyor Generals Corner), because the three states that meet at the corner are in three time zones.

== Facilities ==
The Cameron Corner Store was established in 1990 by a Vietnam War veteran, Sandy Nall, and his wife Cathrine. As of 2014, the store was operated by the sole permanent residents of Cameron Corner, Fenn and Cheryl Miller. The store reportedly has a Queensland liquor licence, a New South Wales postal code and a South Australian telephone number.

The locality also features a desert golf course.

== Education ==
There are no schools in Cameron Corner nor nearby. The alternatives are distance education and boarding school.

Corners in Australia
Name	Surveyor Generals	Poeppel	Haddon	Cameron	MacCabe
States	WA/NT/SA	NT/SA/Qld	SA/Qld	SA/Qld/NSW	SA/Vic/NSW
