= Vincent James Dowling =

Anglo-Australian pastoralist and explorer

- Vincent J. Dowling, Esquire. c1888
- Born: January 11, 1835; Sydney, Colony of New South Wales
- Died: November 5, 1903 (aged 68); Singleton, New South Wales

Vincent James Dowling (11 January 1835 – 5 November 1903) was an Australian explorer and pastoralist.

== Early life ==
Dowling was born in Sydney in 1835 to the solicitor Willoughby James Dowling and his wife Lilias Dickson. Lilias was the daughter of John Dickson, the Scottish engineer who first brought the steam engine to Australia. Vincent's grand uncle was Sir James Dowling, the Chief Justice of New South Wales. He was educated for a short while in Ashfield, and then in England. His father committed suicide when he was fourteen years old. Dowling had notable land-owning family contacts in the Williams River district, in particular at Canningalla near Dungog. As a young man, he moved to this region and soon after become a pastoralist, holding land at Aberbaldie near Walcha in the New England district for around 3 years. He made long droving trips, leading sheep and cattle to the markets in Victoria in elsewhere.

== Pastoralist ==
In 1859 he established a station at Fort Bourke (now known as Bourke) on the Darling River, starting with 1200 Hereford cattle. A year later he became a Justice of the Peace in NSW (Mudgee, Bourke, Sofala and Bathurst) then Queensland. Around this time, Dowling began exploring in south west Queensland, tracing the Paroo and the Bulloo Rivers to their sources, and in 1861, established Caiwarroo and Eulo stations. These were followed by more stations on the Cuttaburra and Warrego, and Birrawarra and Yantabulla in NSW. In a partnership with George Cox, with himself as the active manager, they leased over 3367 square kilometres of land in the Warrego district. These stations were stocked with Hereford cattle, which Dowling considered superior to the more common Shorthorn breed. According to historian Timothy Bottoms (2013), in 1865, John (Jack) Dowling, was killed on his brother's station at Thargomindah by his Aboriginal servant Pimpilly in revenge for Dowling giving him a beating. Dowling's brother, Vincent, led a posse of settlers including EO Hobkirk in search of Pimpilly. The posse found a large group of Kullilli camped at Thouringowa Waterhole on the eastern side of the Bulloo River and although they said that Pimpillly was not with them, according to Kullilli descendant Hazel McKellar (1984, p 57), the posse 'chased them towards the Grey Range, shooting them down as they ran. According to Hobkirk, Later in the day the posse went to another Camp, about 20 miles [32 km] down the river and shot about the same number (Hobkirk cited in Bottoms, 2013, p 63). Hazel McKellar (1984, p 57) says the posse was led by the native police and that overall about 300 were killed.https://c21ch.newcastle.edu.au/colonialmassacres/detail.php?r=675

Vincent Dowling is also credited with establishing a pastoral lease called Thargomindah, and this was to become the town of Thargomindah, which he sold in 1874. At the time of its sale, Thargomindah covered a massive 129 km of Bulloo River frontage and 2590 square km of mulga ridges and salt bush plains.

Dowling married Frances Emily Breillat in Sydney in 1877. They raised four sons and three daughters. One of the daughters, Ruth (who married to become Ruth Fairfax) later becoming known for establishing the Australian Country Women's Association. His wife returned to western Queensland with him, and was possibly the first white woman to live in this region.

By 1875, the partnership of Dowling and Cox had finished in Queensland and Dowling moved to Rylstone, where he established a merino stud, along with breeding Hereford cattle and horses. In 1880 he purchased Gummin Gumin in the Warrumbungles, and in the same year Walla Walla, near Gilgandra, Connemara (near Cooper Creek in Queensland) and Pillicawarrina on the Macquarie River near Quambone. From the 1890s to the end of his life, the economics of the time, and drought, saw his finances take a beating, along with complicated court costs over selections on Pillacawarrina.

During his life, Dowling was involved in many high level societies and associations. He was a member of the Bathurst Anglican Synod, vice president of the Royal Agricultural Society of NSW, the Australian Jockey Club and the Stockowners Association, as well as councillor for the Tax Payers Union. He died in 1903 and is buried at the Mudgee Anglican cemetery.

== Legacy ==
In the rural town of Thargomindah, there is a statue bust of Dowling
