= Durham, Queensland =

Durham
- Suburb
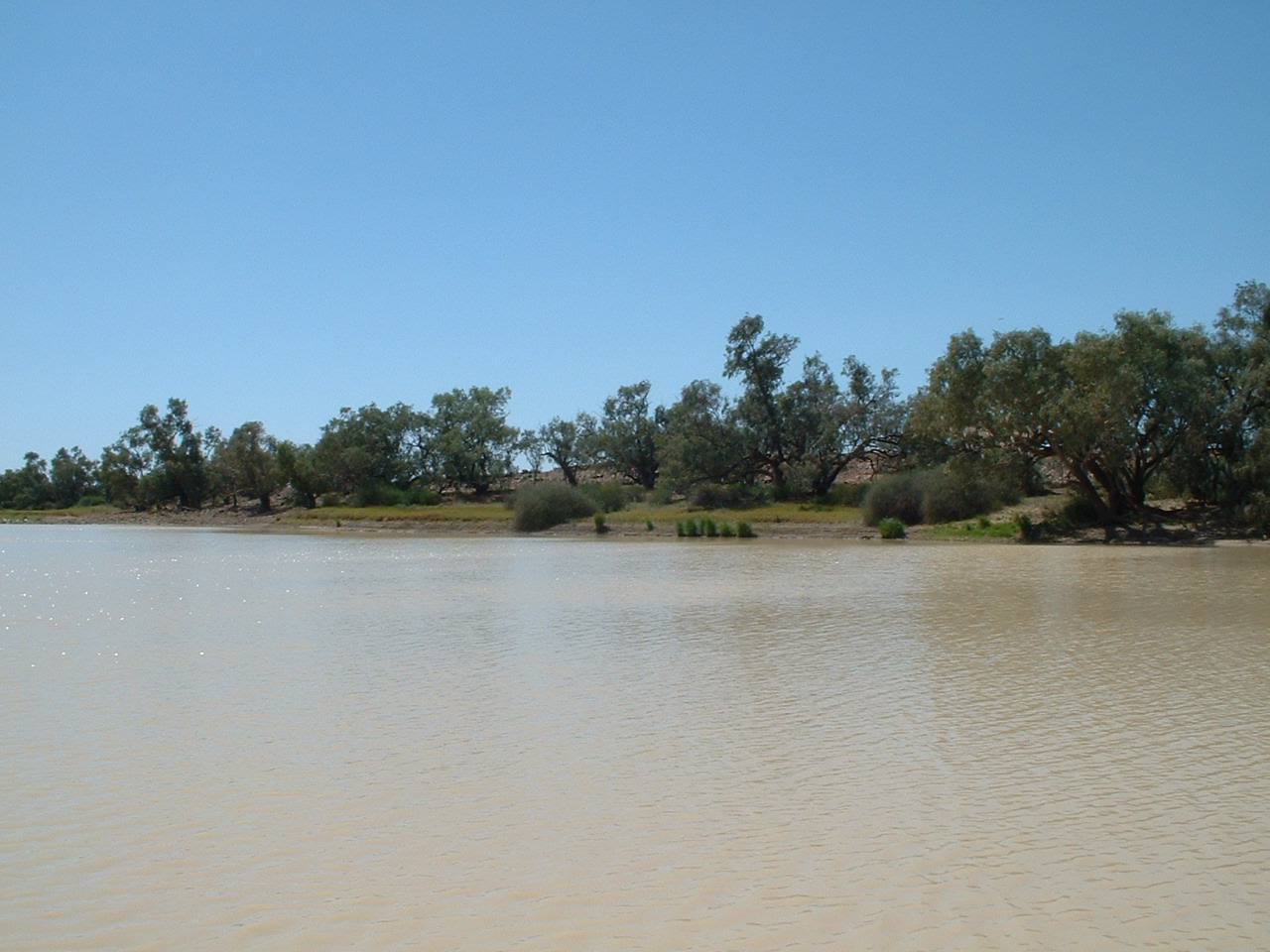
- Bullah Bullah waterhole, 2008

- Interactive map of Durham
- Coordinates: 27.2586°S 141.7930°E
- Country: Australia
- State: Queensland
- City: Bulloo Shire
- LGA: Bulloo Shire
- Location: 242 km (150 mi) WNW of Thargomindah; 438 km (272 mi) WNW of Cunnamulla; 732 km (455 mi) W of St George; 1,228 km (763 mi) W of Brisbane

Government
  - State electorate: Warrego
  - Federal division: Maranoa

Area
  - Total: 18,789.4 km^{2} (7,254.6 sq mi)

Population
  - Total: 31 (2021 census)
  - Density: 0.001650/km^{2} (0.00427/sq mi)
- Time zone: UTC+10:00 (AEST)
- Postcode: 4492
Suburbs around Durham
South Australia	Tanbar	Eromanga
South Australia	Durham	Eromanga
South Australia	Cameron Corner	Noccundra

Durham is a rural locality in the Shire of Bulloo, Queensland, Australia. It is on the Queensland border with South Australia. In the 2021 census, Durham had a population of 31 people.

== Geography ==
Cooper Creek (an Intermittent braided river) enters the locality from the north (Tanbar / Eromanga) and flows south through the locality, exiting to the south (Cameron Corner / Noccundra).

Three major outback roads pass through Durham:

- Adventure Way to South Australia
- Bullo Developmental Road to Cunnamulla
- Cooper Developmental Road to Quilpie

The land use is grazing on native vegetation.

== History ==
The area is the traditional lands of the Yandruwandha people.

The Burke and Wills expedition passed through Durham.

== Demographics ==
In the 2016 census, Durham had a population of 36 people.

In the 2021 census, Durham had a population of 31 people.

== Heritage listings ==
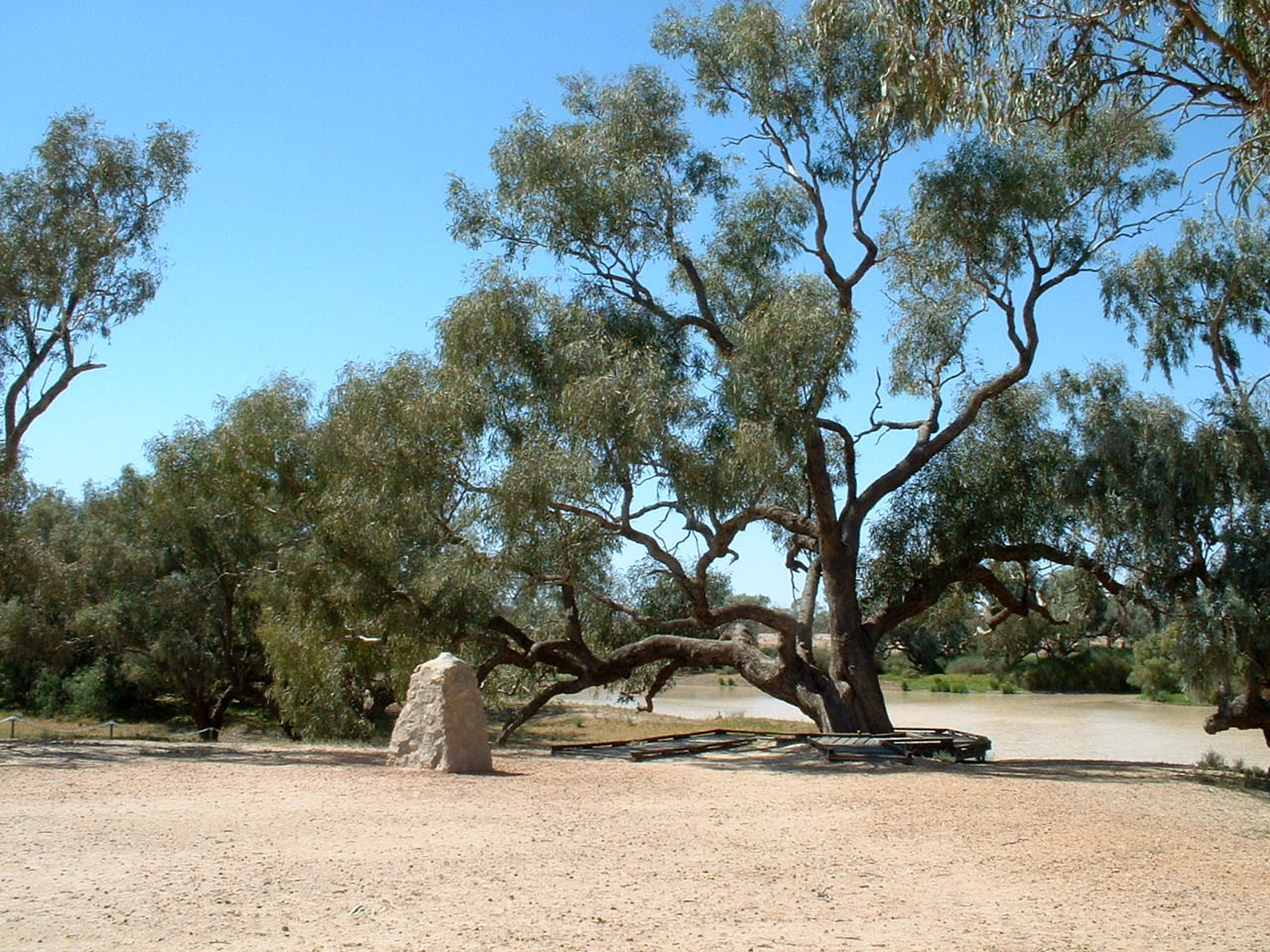
Burke and Wills dig tree, 2008

The heritage-listed Burke and Wills Dig Tree is located beside the Bullah Bullah Waterhole at the Nappa Merrie pastoral station (27.6216°S 141.0734°E).

== Education ==
There are no schools in Durham and none nearby. Distance education and boarding school are the alternatives.

== Economy ==
There are a number of homesteads in the locality:

- Durham Downs (27.0789°S 141.9075°E)
- Joes Outstation (26.9300°S 141.7920°E)
- Kihee (27.3880°S 142.6203°E)
- Nappa Merrie (27.5962°S 141.1068°E)
- New Bundeena Outstation (27.3800°S 142.5935°E)
- St Anne's Cottage (27.4363°S 141.2940°E)
- Woomanooka (27.2509°S 142.1295°E)

== See also ==
- Durham Downs Station
