= Bancannia Lake =

- Location within New South Wales
- Location: Far West New South Wales
- Coordinates: 30°48′S 141°52′E
- Type: Endorheic lake

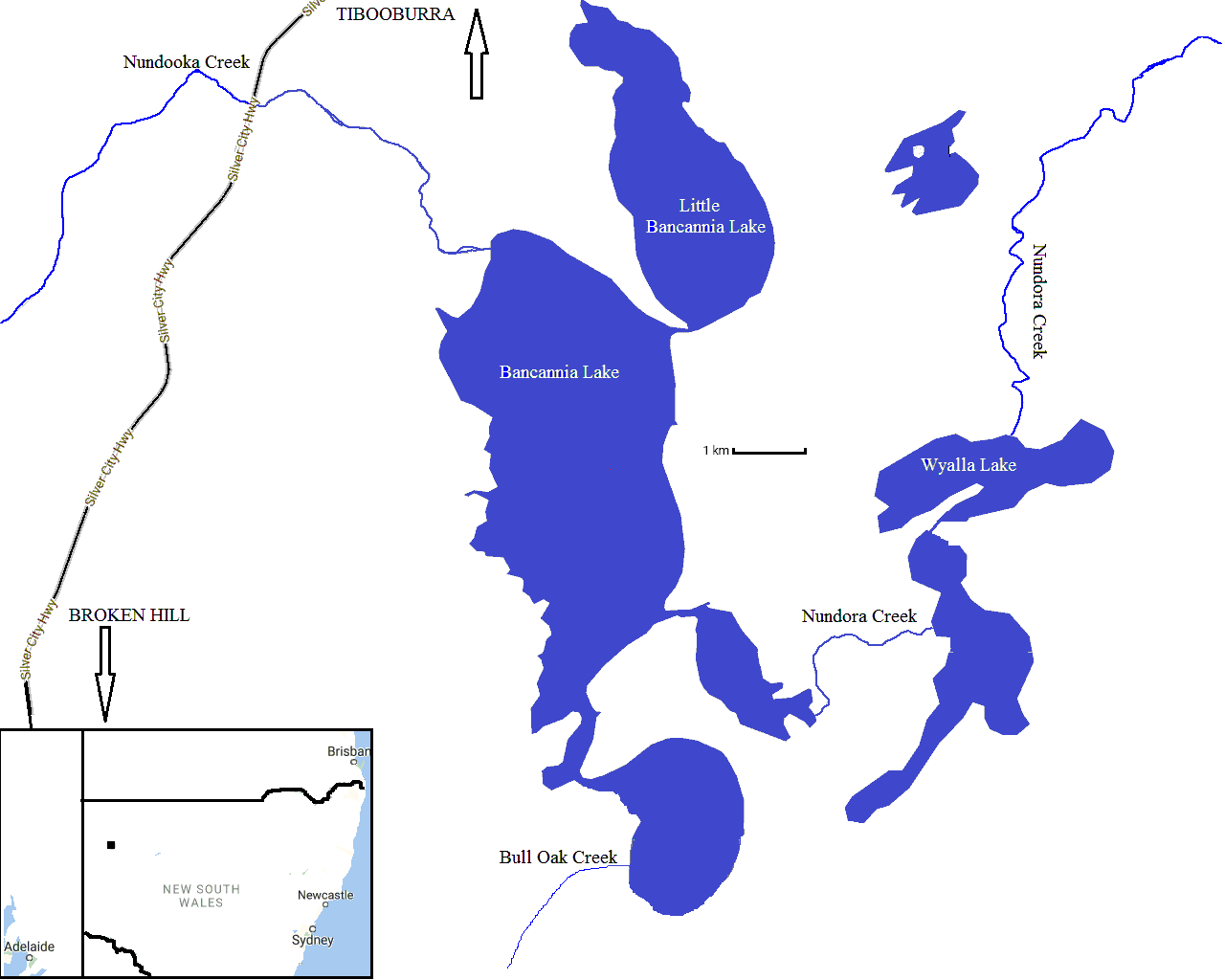
Map of Buncannia Lake, New South Wales

Bancannia Lake is an Endorheic lake in the Bulloo-Bancannia drainage basin of Far West New South Wales.
