= Frederick Schoenfeld =

Swiss-born Australian artist, printmaker, lithographer and art teacher

Fritz Schoenfeld
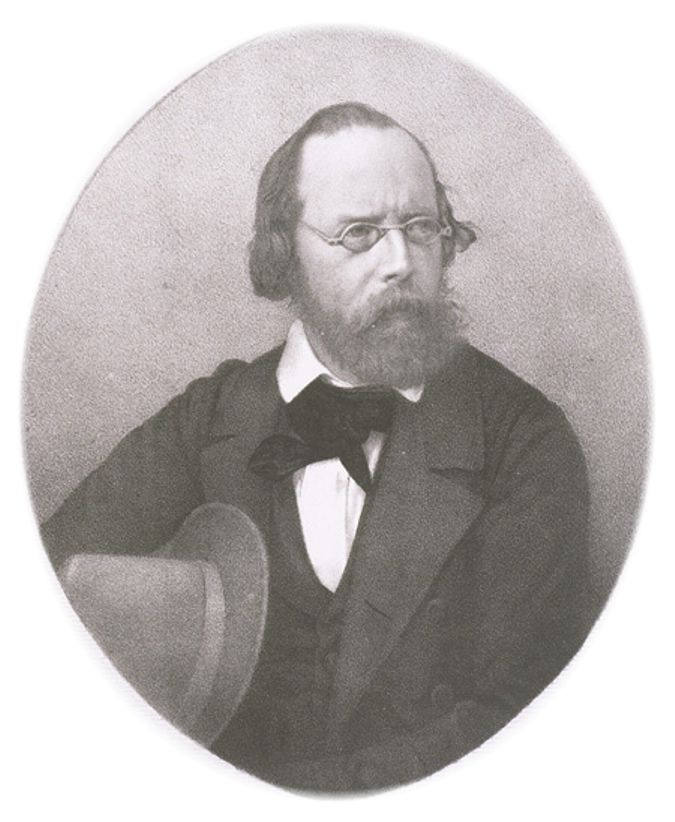
- 1861
- Born: Frederick Schoenfeld; 1810; Switzerland
- Died: April 21, 1868; Richmond, Victoria, Australia
- Notable work: Fragmenta phytographiae Australiae, The Plants Indigenous to the Colony of Victoria, Analytical Drawings of Australian Mosses

Frederick Schoenfeld aka Fritz Schoenfeld (1810, Switzerland – 21 April 1868, Richmond, Victoria), was a Swiss-born Australian artist, printmaker, lithographer and art teacher. He is noted for providing the illustrations for the 6 volumes (1859–68) of Fragmenta phytographiae Australiae by Ferdinand von Mueller, then director of the National Herbarium of Victoria, and for The Plants Indigenous to the Colony of Victoria (1860–65) and Analytical Drawings of Australian Mosses (1864).

Schoenfeld arrived in Australia on 8 May 1858 on board the Scottish Chief, and worked in Melbourne as a freelance artist, lithographer and drawing master. He was employed over the period 1859 until 1862 by Frederick McCoy, director of the National Museum of Victoria in Melbourne, to draw and lithograph plates for McCoy's books, Prodromus of the Palaeontology of Victoria and Prodromus of the Zoology of Victoria, both published in the 1870s.

In the 1860s Schoenfeld gave drawing classes at the "Melbourner Deutscher Turnverein", but when the club’s premises were destroyed by a fire in December 1866 he was left with no regular income. He became depressed about his straitened circumstances and after an unsuccessful first attempt at suicide, drowned himself in a water-filled quarry at Richmond. He was survived by his wife Philippine, née Phen.

== Gallery ==
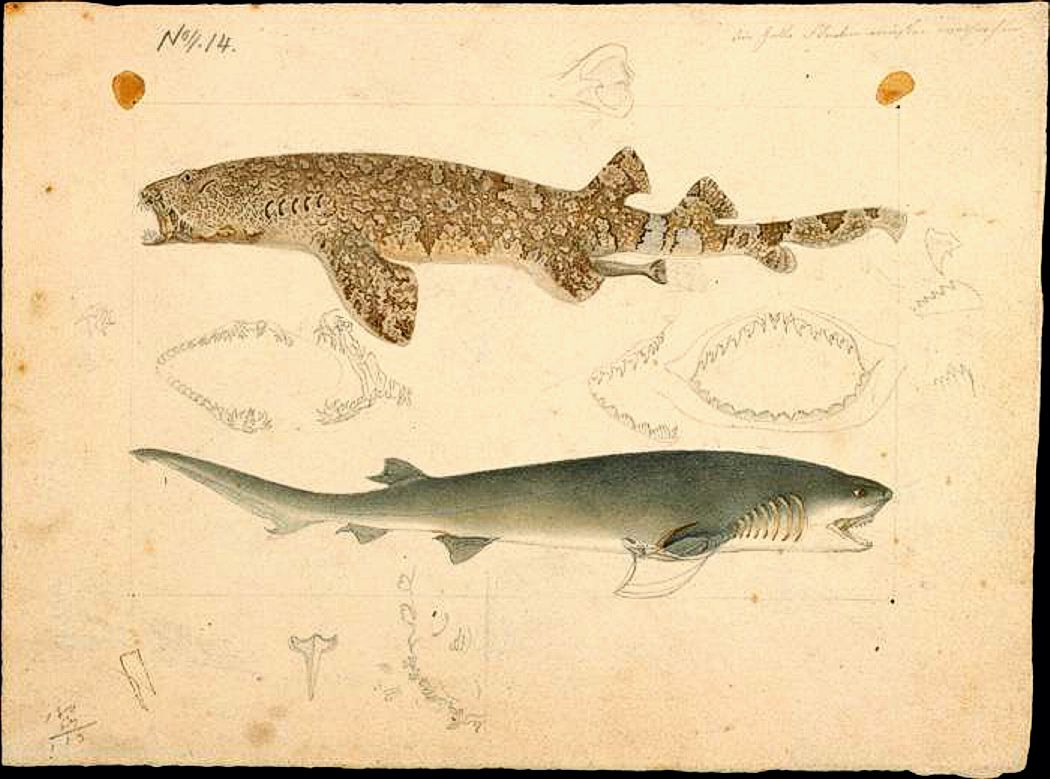
Banded wobbegong and broadnose sevengill shark

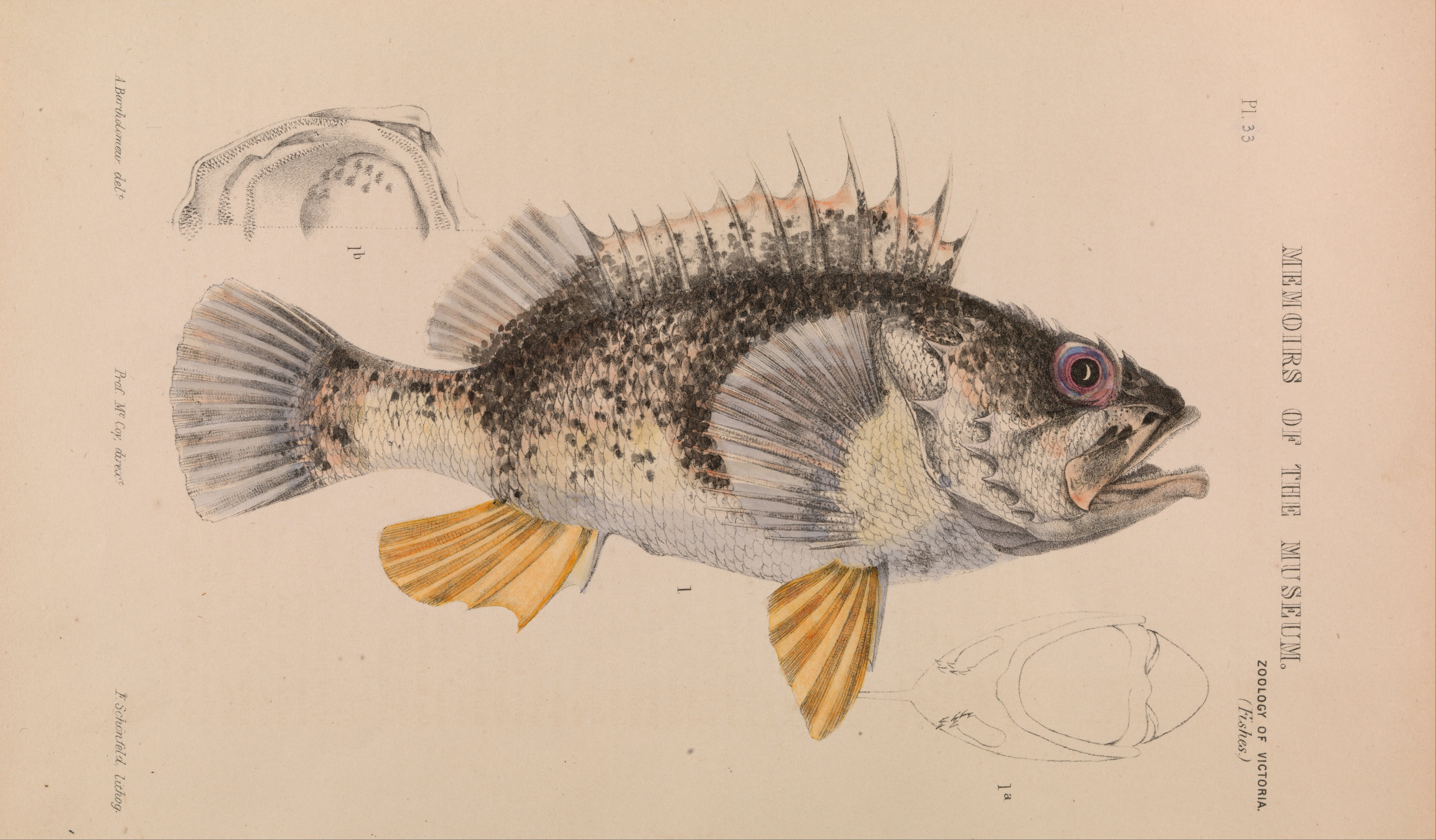
Ocean perch

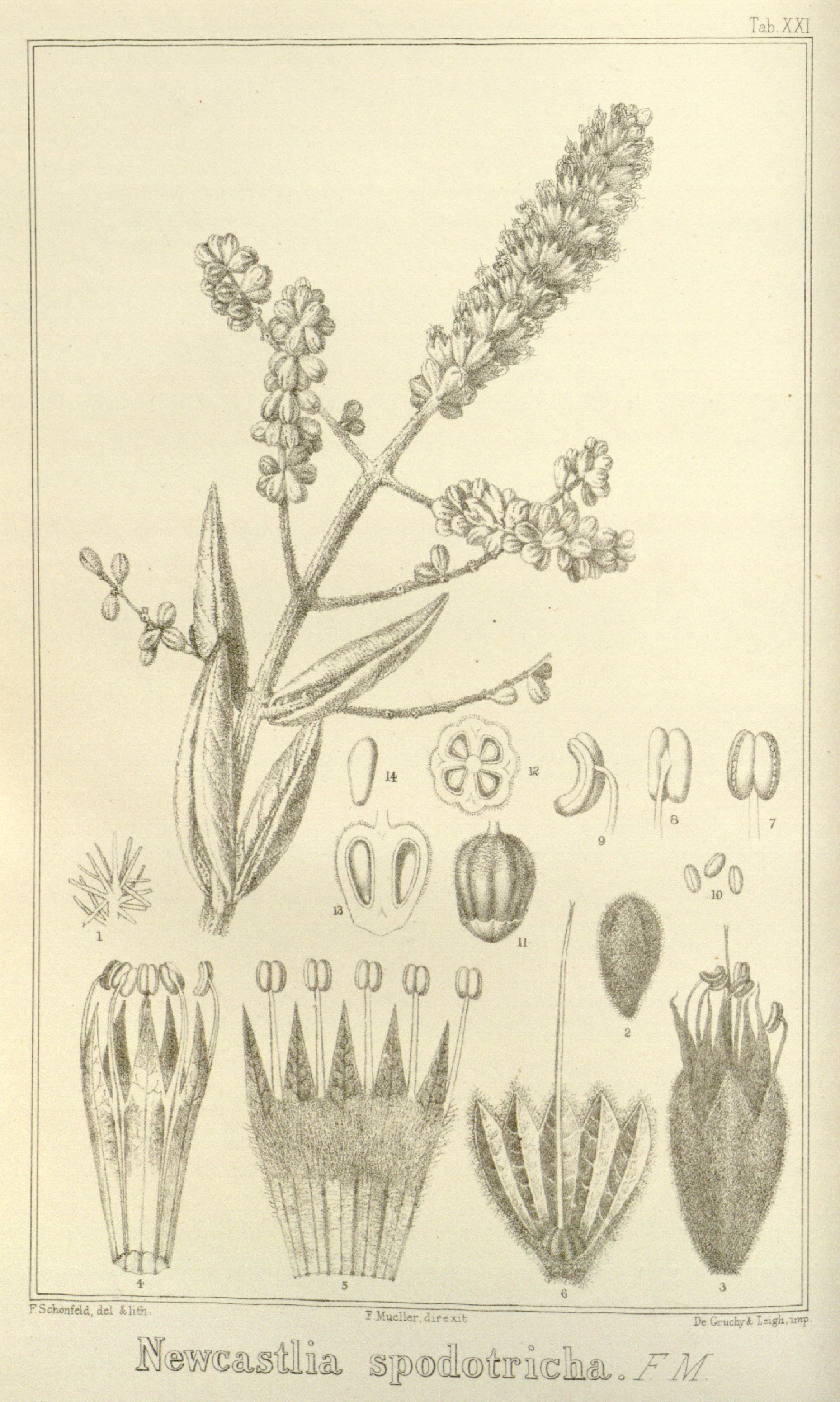
Newcastelia spodiotricha

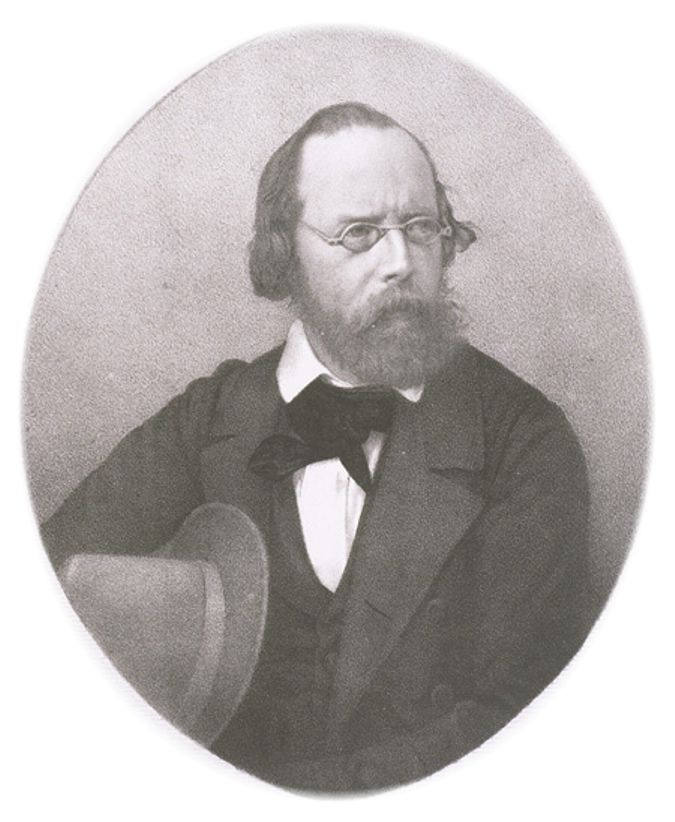
Portrait of Ludwig Becker
