= Bulloo-Bancannia drainage basin =

The Bulloo-Bancannia drainage basin or Cooper Creek–Bulloo River Basin is a Level 2 drainage basin that covers part of western Queensland and New South Wales. It was recognised by the Bureau of Meteorology and CSIRO as a subdivision of the Lake Eyre basin in the 2012 Australian Water Resources Assessment.

The basin is relatively arid and is dominated by Acacia shrublands, but is sufficiently productive to be used for sheep and cattle grazing. Rainfall is extremely variable, and averages around 240 mm per annum. Despite this, the region is home to hundreds of identified species of native vertebrates. During dry years, wildlife depend on scattered waterholes. At least eight species of fish have been observed within this drainage division, all of which are also found in the Lake Eyre sub-basin.

The Bulloo-Bancannia basin is Australia's second largest endorheic basin, with an area of 98 820 km².

It may be divided into two separate drainage basins: the Bulloo basin in the north (75 528 km²) and the Bancannia basin in the south (23 292 km²).

In times of rainfall, an ephemeral saline lake (Lake Bancannia) exists within Bancannia basin. The Bulloo basin contains the Bulloo River.

4% of this drainage division is protected as nature conservation areas. The division contains several large national parks.

Some of the towns within this drainage basin include Quilpie and Thargomindah.
