= Thargomindah =

- Town
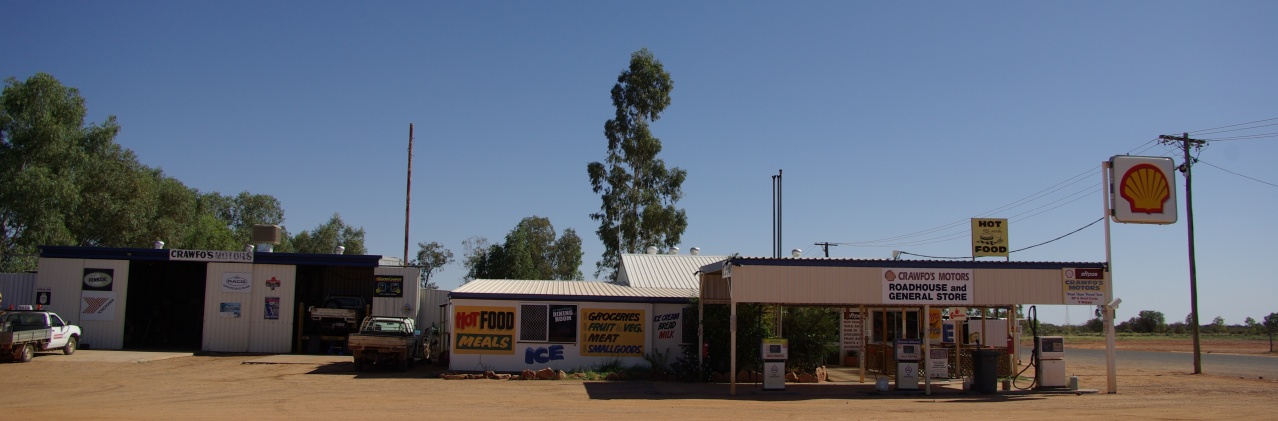
- Outback roadhouse of Thargomindah

- Interactive map of Thargomindah
- Coordinates: 27.9922°S 143.8197°E
- Country: Australia
- State: Queensland
- LGA: Shire of Bulloo
- Location: 197 km (122 mi) W of Cunnamulla; 490 km (300 mi) W of St George; 857 km (533 mi) W of Toowoomba; 987 km (613 mi) W of Brisbane
- Established: 1860s

Government
  - State electorate: Warrego
  - Federal division: Maranoa

Area
  - Total: 15,213 km^{2} (5,874 sq mi)
- Elevation: 130 m (430 ft)

Population
  - Total: 243 (2021 census)
  - Density: 0.01597/km^{2} (0.04137/sq mi)
- Time zone: UTC+10:00 (AEST)
- Postcode: 4492
- County: Wellington
- Mean max temp: 29.5 °C (85.1 °F)
- Mean min temp: 16.1 °C (61.0 °F)
- Annual rainfall: 300.4 mm (11.83 in)
Localities around Thargomindah
Eromanga	Eromanga	Quilpie
Noccundra	Thargomindah	Yowah
Bulloo Downs	Hungerford	Eulo

Thargomindah /ˈθɑːrɡoʊmɪndə/ (frequently shortened to Thargo) is a rural town and locality in the Shire of Bulloo, Queensland, Australia. The town of Thargomindah is the administrative centre for the Shire of Bulloo. In the 2021 census, the locality of Thargomindah had a population of 243.

On 17 April 2020, the Queensland Government decided to reorganise the nine localities in the Shire of Bulloo, resulting in six localities. Thargomindah, previously being 43.0 square kilometres (16.6 sq mi) of the area immediately surrounding the town of Thargomindah, was enlarged through the incorporation of all of Bullawarra (except for a small portion in the south of Bullawarra which was absorbed into Bulloo Downs), all of Dynevor and all of Norley, creating a locality of 15,213 square kilometres (5,874 sq mi).

== Geography ==
Thargominah is located in South West Queensland on the Adventure Way, approximately 1,000 kilometres (620 mi) west of the state capital, Brisbane, and 200 kilometres (120 mi) west of the town of Cunnamulla.

The town of Thargomindah is the administrative centre for the Shire of Bulloo. It lies on the Bulloo River in the centre of the locality.

Five main roads radiate from the town:

- the Bundeena Road goes west to Noccundra
- the Quilpie Road goes north-east to Quilpie
- the Cunnamulla Road (also known as the Bulloo Developmental Road and the Adventure Way) goes east to Yowah and Eulo and beyond to Cunnamulla
- the Hungerford Road goes south to Hungerford
- the Bulloo Downs Road goes south-west to Bulloo Downs

Thargomindah is part of the Channel Country where the rivers are mostly dry riverbeds except for seasonal flooding. The locality contributes to three major drainage basins:

- in the south-east, creeks flow into the Paroo River system in the Murray-Darling basin
- in the centre, creeks flow into the Bulloo River system in the Bulloo-Bancannia drainage basin
- in the north-west, creeks flow into Wilson River system in the Lake Eyre basin

The Bulloo River flows through the locality from the north-east (Quilpie) through the town and exits the locality to the south-west (Bulloo Downs).

The land is principally used for low density cattle grazing. The Dynevor Downs homestead is located on the Cunnamulla Road (28.0911°S 144.3585°E).

Lake Bindegolly National Park is located in the east of the locality (28.0086°S 144.1939°E). A portion of the Currawinya National Park is on the south-eastern boundary of the locality (28.2041°S 144.5293°E), although the bulk of that national park was in adjacent Hungerford.

Lake Bullawarra is in the northwest of the locality (27.8898°S 143.5993°E) approximately 25 kilometres (16 mi) NW of the town and is a nationally important wetland. It is a habitat for a vulnerable species, the Major Mitchell's cockatoo.

== History ==
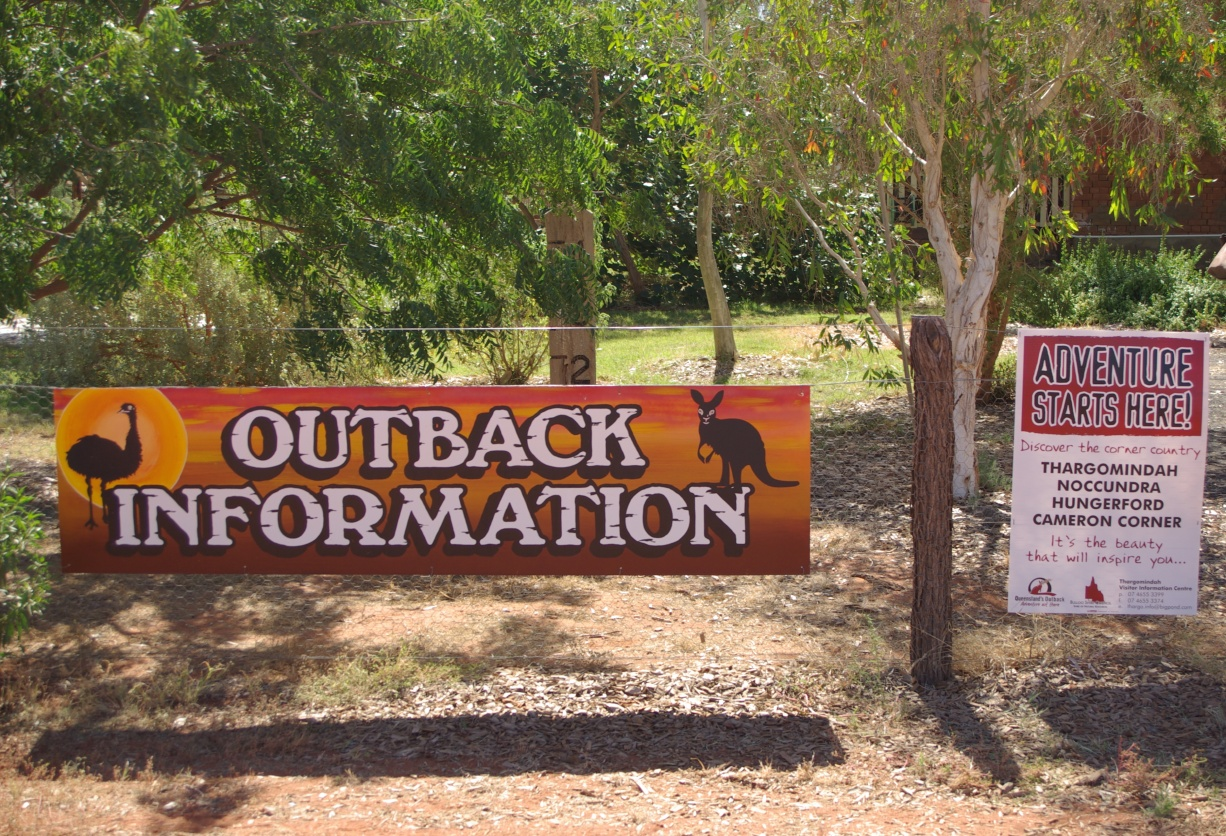
Tourist information

Thargomindah lies on the traditional lands of the Kalali people who seemed to have had a close association with the Wongkumara, Margany and Badjiri peoples from neighbouring regions along the Bulloo and Wilson Rivers. The Margany language (also known as Maranganji), the Badjiri language and the Kalali language (Galali) are now mostly extinct, although some revitalisation projects have been commenced.

The Thargomindah area was first explored by the British in the early 1860s by colonist Vincent James Dowling, who established the Thargomindah pastoral property in 1865 with his brother John Dowling. Violence with the Aboriginal people soon ensued and John Dowling was killed. In retribution, Vincent Dowling and a Native Police detachment under Sub-Inspector James Gilmour from the Yowah barracks pursued the Kalali. These forces massacred a large number of Kalali people near the Thuringowa waterhole. A recent publication disputes these accounts of the massacre.

After the massacre, a new Native Police barracks called the Bulloo Barracks was established on Dowling's property at a crossing of the Bulloo River. From the 1870s, the town of Thargomindah developed around these barracks. Thargomindah is an Aboriginal word meaning echidna.

A post office was established in 1870 and a telegraph line connected the town to Cunnamulla in 1881.

Thargomindah Provisional School opened on 1 April 1884. In 1892 it became Thargomindah State School.

The 1890s saw the town prosper as the service and administrative centre of a pastoral district. An extension of the Western railway line to the town was planned for many years; however it never eventuated. The railway did reach Cunnamulla in 1898 and Quilpie in 1917.

Thargomindah was one of the first towns in Australia to produce hydroelectric power from 1898 until 1951. The old bore into the Great Artesian Basin was a source of energy when electric street lights were lit and coupled to a turbine driven by the bore's natural water pressure. The generator was taken from a unit powered by a steam engine and purchased by the Bulloo Divisional Board becoming the first municipality owned power plant in Queensland. After that power was supplied by diesel generators until 1988, when the town was connected to the state power grid via Cunnamulla. The power station is still operating with a daily opening to the public.

St Edmund's Anglican Church at 60 Dowling Street (27.9963°S 143.8229°E) was dedicated on 22 October 1960 by Archbishop Reginald Halse. Its closure on 28 May 2003 was approved by Venerable Gary Frederick Harch, Archdeacon of the West. It is now used as a private home.

On 17 April 2020 the Queensland Government decided to reorganise the nine localities in the Shire of Bulloo, resulting in six localities. Thargomindah, previously being 43.0 square kilometres (16.6 sq mi) of the area immediately surrounding the town of Thargomindah, was enlarged through the incorporation of all of Bullawarra (except for a small portion in the south of Bullawarra which was absorbed into Bulloo Downs), all of Dynevor and all of Norley, creating a locality of 15,213 square kilometres (5,874 sq mi).

== Demographics ==
In the 2021 census, the locality of Thargomindah had a population of 243.

In the 2016 census, the locality of Thargomindah had a population of 270.

In the 2011 census, the locality of Thargomindah had a population of 206.

In the 2006 census, the town of Thargomindah had a population of 203.

== Heritage listings ==
Thargomindah has a number of nearby heritage-listed sites, including:

- Dr Ludwig Becker's Grave, Bulloo River, Bulloo Downs
- Burke and Wills Dig Tree at Nappa Merrie Station, Durham
- Noccundra Hotel, Wilson Street, Noccundra

== Facilities ==
An information centre is located at 37 Dowling Street, Thargomindah. The building is a renovation of a children's hostel which was built in early 1960, it then became a block of flats and ended up being an empty run-down building until converted to a very modern facility containing the Visitor Information Centre, Library and Coffee Shop. The hostel was used for children who lived in remote properties where they would board at the hostel during the week, returning home on the weekends to their families.

The Information Centre contains brochures, pamphlets and maps on the South West Queensland corner and surrounding areas. It is the first place where people stop when they visit Thargomindah to get the latest road conditions, directions, places to stay, things to see and do and the latest information on events.

Bulloo Shire Council operates Thargomindah Library at Shire Office, Dowling Street, Thargomindah.

== Education ==
Thargomindah State School is a government primary (Early Childhood to Year 6) school for boys and girls at 1 Dowling Street (27.9952°S 143.8267°E). In 2018, the school had an enrolment of 24 students with 3 teachers and 5 non-teaching staff (3 full-time equivalent).

There are no nearby secondary schools. The options are distance education and boarding school.

== Water ==
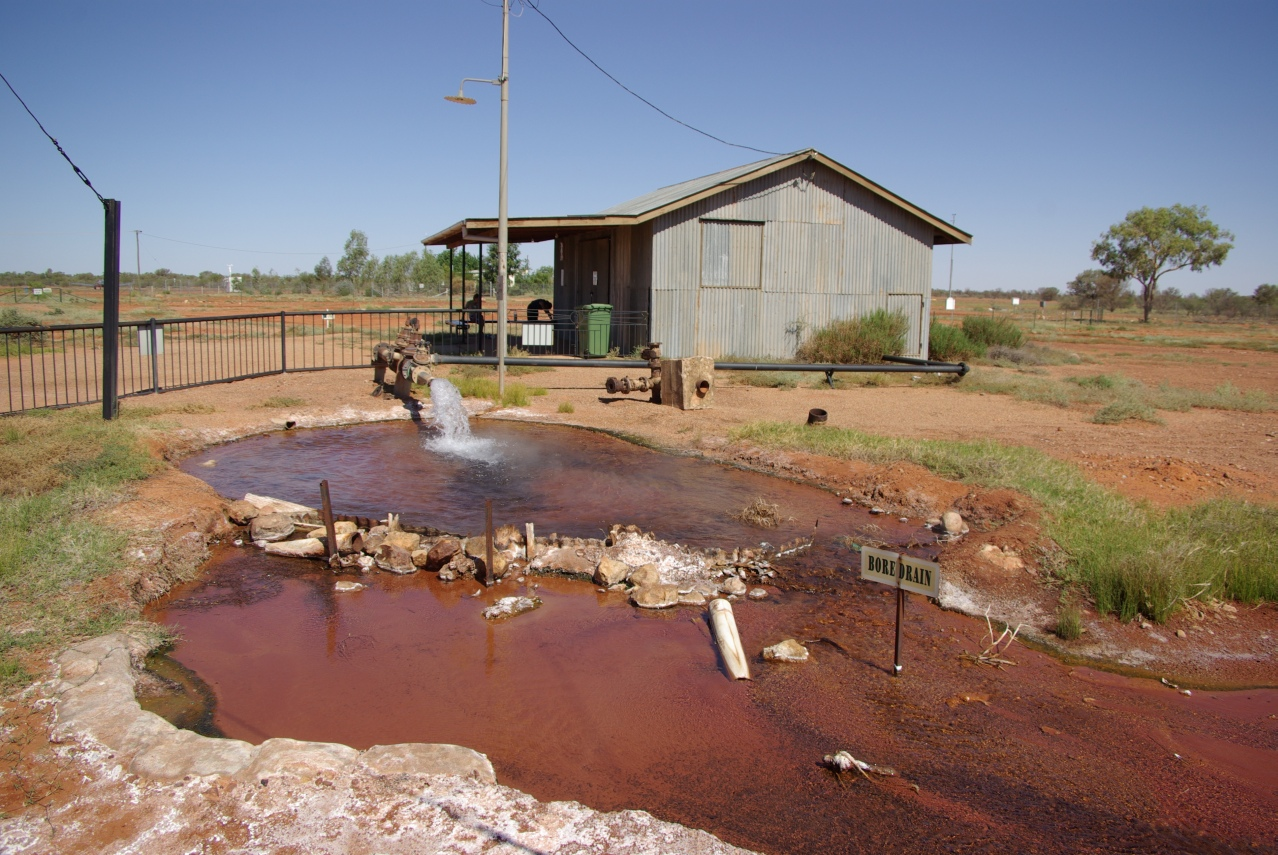
Hot water bore hole into the Great Artesian Basin

Thargomindah has a pressurised hot spring from a bore into the Great Artesian Basin and has produced hydroelectric power from the basin in the past. After 2 years of drilling, a good supply of water was found in 1893. The temperature was 86 °C (187 °F). In 1924, it was recorded that the bore had a daily output of 2,500 cubic metres (88,000 ft^{3}) and today of 1,300 cubic metres (46,000 ft^{3}) at 84 °C (183 °F). There is a plentiful water supply for the population and the arid area available for irrigation in front and backyards and public warm showers are provided.

== Transport ==
Thargomindah Airport is located to the north of the town on Kerr Street (27.9872°S 143.8156°E). It is operated by the Bulloo Shire Council and there are 2 scheduled flights from Brisbane each week on Regional Express Airlines. There is a sealed runway 1,463-metre (4,800 ft) long and an unsealed runway 846 metres (2,776 ft) long. It was completely rebuilt in 2018.

The Dynevor Downs Airport (ICAO: YDNV) is located immediately to the east of the Dynevor Downs Homestead (28.0912°S 144.3695°E) with three unsealed runways (north–south, east–west, and NE–SW), the longest being 1,050 metres (3,440 ft), the others being about 800 metres (2,600 ft).

== Climate ==
Thargomindah has a hot semi-arid climate (Köppen BSh), very closely bordering on a hot arid climate (BWh), which is found in the western part of the shire. Summers are sweltering and generally dry except when monsoonal incursions into the continent bring heavy rain, whilst winters are warm and dry with cool to cold mornings.

Climate data for Thargomindah
Month	Jan	Feb	Mar	Apr	May	Jun	Jul	Aug	Sep	Oct	Nov	Dec	Year
Record high °C (°F)	48.8 (119.8)	47.2 (117.0)	43.8 (110.8)	38.9 (102.0)	32.9 (91.2)	30.4 (86.7)	32.5 (90.5)	38.1 (100.6)	42.5 (108.5)	42.8 (109.0)	46.2 (115.2)	47.2 (117.0)	48.8 (119.8)
Mean daily maximum °C (°F)	38.8 (101.8)	36.8 (98.2)	34.1 (93.4)	29.6 (85.3)	23.9 (75.0)	20.1 (68.2)	20.2 (68.4)	23.0 (73.4)	27.7 (81.9)	31.5 (88.7)	34.4 (93.9)	37.0 (98.6)	29.8 (85.6)
Mean daily minimum °C (°F)	25.8 (78.4)	24.4 (75.9)	21.8 (71.2)	16.8 (62.2)	11.0 (51.8)	7.9 (46.2)	6.8 (44.2)	8.4 (47.1)	12.8 (55.0)	16.9 (62.4)	20.7 (69.3)	23.6 (74.5)	16.4 (61.5)
Record low °C (°F)	17.2 (63.0)	12.3 (54.1)	9.4 (48.9)	6.5 (43.7)	1.0 (33.8)	−0.8 (30.6)	−0.9 (30.4)	0.1 (32.2)	4.4 (39.9)	6.2 (43.2)	9.7 (49.5)	13.7 (56.7)	−0.9 (30.4)
Average rainfall mm (inches)	32.6 (1.28)	42.8 (1.69)	39.0 (1.54)	13.1 (0.52)	17.1 (0.67)	17.5 (0.69)	14.3 (0.56)	9.9 (0.39)	12.5 (0.49)	17.4 (0.69)	31.5 (1.24)	27.1 (1.07)	275.2 (10.83)
Average rainy days (≥ 0.2 mm)	4.2	3.7	4.0	1.6	2.6	4.0	3.6	2.0	2.8	3.4	4.9	4.2	41
