= Eromanga Refinery =

Oil refinery in Queensland, Australia

- Location within Queensland
- Location: Eromanga, Queensland, Australia; 26.668°S 143.273°E

Refinery details
- Owner: IOR
- Opened: 1986
- Capacity: 1,250 barrels per day (199 m^{3}/d)

Eromanga Refinery is a small, specialist oil refinery near Eromanga in South West Queensland, Australia. Eromanga is the largest oil producing area in mainland Australia. The refinery is approximately 1,000 kilometres (620 mi) west of Brisbane, and almost as far from any coastline.

The refinery has been owned and operated by IOR since 1986. The primary product is low-particulate diesel, aimed particularly at the mining and outback transport industry.

The company produces diesel and provides full supply chain service including transport and wholesale and retail sale to the transport and aviation industries. It processes 1,250 barrels of oil per day, drawn from nearby oil fields.

The name IOR is derived from the original company name of Inland Oil Refiners.

At the retail end of the supply chain, the company has over 70 diesel stops using remote sensing to ensure supply at unstaffed depots.

== See also ==
- List of oil refineries
