= Eromanga, Queensland =

Eromanga
- Town
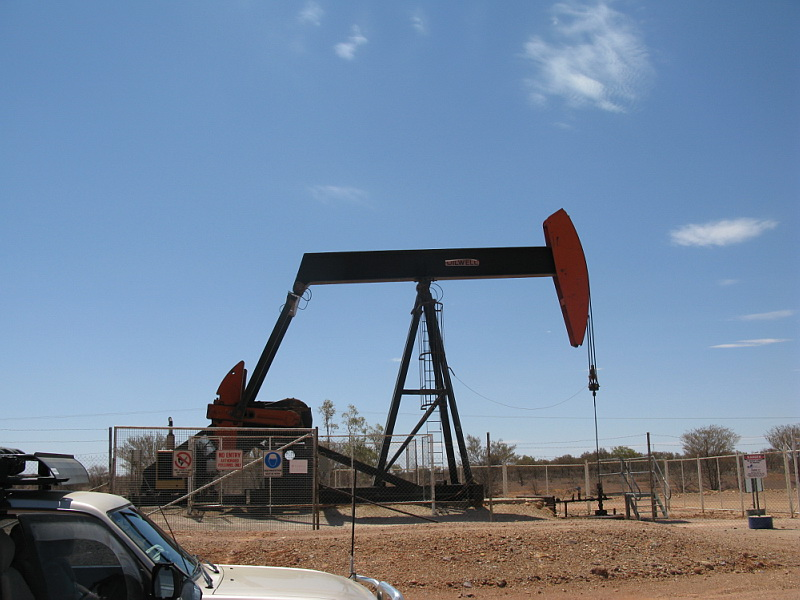
- Oil pumpjack near Eromanga

- Interactive map of Eromanga
- Coordinates: 26.6680°S 143.2686°E
- Country: Australia
- State: Queensland
- LGA: Shire of Quilpie
- Location: 106 km (66 mi) W of Quilpie; 317 km (197 mi) W of Charleville; 584 km (363 mi) W of Roma; 1,062 km (660 mi) WNW of Brisbane

Government
  - State electorate: Warrego
  - Federal division: Maranoa

Area
  - Total: 28,252.0 km^{2} (10,908.2 sq mi)

Population
  - Total: 98 (2021 census)
  - Density: 0.003469/km^{2} (0.00898/sq mi)
- Time zone: UTC+10:00 (AEST)
- Postcode: 4480
- County: Gordon
Localities around Eromanga
Windorah	Jundah	Adavale
Tanbar	Eromanga	Quilpie
Durham	Noccundra	Thargomindah

Eromanga is an outback town and locality in the Shire of Quilpie, Queensland, Australia. In the 2021 census, the locality of Eromanga had a population of 98 people.

== Geography ==
The town lies on the edge of what is called the Eromanga Inland Sea, which existed in the Early Cretaceous. The Eromanga region has abundant oil wells and opal mines. Dinosaur fossils, including Australia's largest dinosaur a titanosaur species of sauropod, have also been found here making it an area of interest for palaeontologists. It is located on Ngandangara territory.

Eromanga has been touted as the town in Australia located the farthest from any ocean. However, this claim does not stand up to scrutiny. See Pole of inaccessibility for approximations of other locations in Australia that could also make such claims.

== History ==
The name of the town Eromanga goes back as far as about 1860. The name is thought to have come from an Aboriginal word that means "hot gale plain" or "windy plain", though the language and dialect is unknown.

Eromanga Post Office opened by October 1902 (a receiving office had been open from 1892).

Eromanga Provisional School opened on 5 July 1897 but closed in 1908. In 1910 it reopened as Eromanga State School but closed again on 28 February 1911. The school reopened on 23 October 1917 but closed again. It reopened in 1919 until it closed on 22 March 1936. It reopened on 28 May 1956 and closed again on 11 December 1981. It reopened 29 January 1990.

One property which is located in Eromanga which was first written up in 1928 by Keith Pegler, Monler Station, is now in its third generation of farmers. The property, located 11 kilometres (6.8 mi) south of the town centre, was originally run as a sheep and cattle farm by Keith and has since been passed to Ross Pegler before the current Scott Pegler who runs the station with his family. The property has struggled over the years with natural disasters ranging from drought to flooding. In 2019 a period of over 200 days "without a decent downpour" was reported.

As at 2012, the town of Eromanga had a population averaging from 30 to 40.

== Demographics ==
In the 2016 census, the locality of Eromanga had a population of 119 people.

In the 2021 census, the locality of Eromanga had a population of 98 people.

== Economy ==
The Eromanga Refinery is an oil microrefinery which is specialized in producing mining equipment fuel.

There are also agricultural industries such as cattle and sheep as many pioneering property owners came and took up land in the 1860s.

== Education ==
Eromanga State School is a government primary (Early Childhood-6) school for boys and girls in Donald Street (26.6692°S 143.2686°E). Between 2010 and 2013, the school had 5 or 6 students enrolled with all students on an individual learning plan with one permanent teacher, a teacher aide (partly funded by the community) plus visiting teachers from other schools. In 2018, the school had an enrolment of 6 students with 2 teachers (1 full-time equivalent) and 3 non-teaching staff (1 full-time equivalent).

There are no secondary schools in Eromanga or nearby. The options are distance education and boarding school.

== Amenities ==
The Eromanga branch of the Queensland Country Women's Association has its rooms on the corner of Deacon and Donald Streets.

== Japanese popular culture ==
In a linguistic coincidence, "eromanga" is a Japanese word for pornographic comics, also known as hentai. The Japanese "eromanga" derives from the English "erotic" and the Japanese "manga". As a result, the town of Eromanga has been referenced in Japanese pop culture including in the first episode of Volume 2 in the anime Ninja Nonsense, in episode 18 of Samurai Flamenco, in the light novel/anime Eromanga Sensei and in episode 8 of Hanaori-san Still Wants to Fight in the Next Life.
