= Bulloo Downs, Queensland =

Bulloo Downs
- Suburb
- Sketch of Bulloo River area near the Kooliatto Waterhole, 1861 by Hermman Beckler, member of the Burke and Wills expedition

- Interactive map of Bulloo Downs
- Coordinates: 28.6023°S 142.8123°E
- Country: Australia
- State: Queensland
- LGA: Shire of Bulloo
- Location: 125 km (78 mi) SW of Thargomindah; 381 km (237 mi) NW of Wanaaring; 787 km (489 mi) SW of Roma; 1,128 km (701 mi) W of Brisbane; 1,066 km (662 mi) NNE of Adelaide

Government
  - State electorate: Warrego
  - Federal division: Maranoa

Area
  - Total: 11,252.1 km^{2} (4,344.5 sq mi)
- Elevation: 93 m (305 ft)

Population
  - Total: 0 (2021 census)
  - Density: 0.00000/km^{2} (0.00000/sq mi)
- Time zone: UTC+10:00 (AEST)
- Postcode: 4492
Suburbs around Bulloo Downs
Noccundra	Thargomindah	Thargomindah
Cameron Corner	Bulloo Downs	Hungerford
Tibooburra (NSW)	Wanaaring (NSW)	Wanaaring (NSW)

Bulloo Downs is a rural locality in the Shire of Bulloo, Queensland, Australia. It is on the Queensland border with New South Wales. In the 2021 census, Bulloo Downs had "no people or a very low population".

On 17 April 2020 the Queensland Government reorganised the nine localities in the Shire, resulting in six localities. It included Bulloo Downs losing a portion of its western land to the locality of Cameron Corner while gaining a small portion from the south of the former Bullawarra (the rest being incorporated into Thargomindah). The area of Bulloo Downs decreased from 12,814.6 square kilometres (4,947.7 sq mi) to 11,252.1 square kilometres (4,344.5 sq mi).

== Geography ==
Adelaide Gate is a border crossing point on the Adelaide Gate Road/Track between Queensland and New South Wales (28.9982°S 142.6029°E).

== History ==
One group of the Burke and Wills expedition camped in Bulloo Downs in 1861; three men from the group died and were buried there. This expedition provided information about the suitability of the land for pastoral purposes and the first recorded settlement was Bulloo Downs Station taken up by Jones, Sullivan and Molesworth Green in 1864.

The locality takes its name from the Bulloo Downs Station. Bulloo is an Aboriginal word from the Kamilaroi language meaning slow.

On 28 January 1919, the Queensland Government placed restrictions on the border crossing at Adelaide Gate to prevent the spread of the Spanish flu into Queensland, which were enforced by the Queensland Police. A medical screening process was used to determine if Queensland residents could safely return to the state.

On 17 April 2020 the Queensland Government reorganised the nine localities in the Shire, resulting in six localities. It included Bulloo Downs losing a small portion of its western land to the locality of Cameron Corner while gaining a small portion from the south of the former Bullawarra (the rest being incorporated into Thargomindah).

== Demographics ==
In the 2016 census, Bulloo Downs had "no people or a very low population".

In the 2021 census, Bulloo Downs had "no people or a very low population".

== Heritage listings ==
Bulloo Downs has a number of heritage-listed sites, including:

- Dr Ludwig Becker's Grave, Bulloo River

== Education ==
There are no schools in Bulloo Downs nor nearby. The options are distance education or boarding school.
