= Noccundra =

- Town
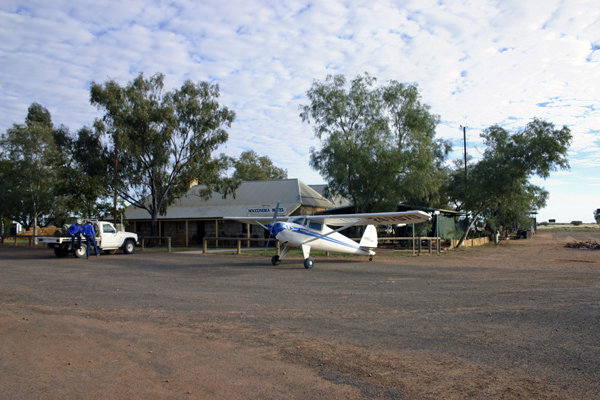
- Noccundra Hotel, July 2010

- Interactive map of Noccundra
- Coordinates: 27.8305°S 142.6080°E
- Country: Australia
- State: Queensland
- LGA: Shire of Bulloo
- Location: 119 km (74 mi) WNW of Thargomindah; 315 km (196 mi) W of Cunnamulla; 608 km (378 mi) W of St George; 1,105 km (687 mi) W of Brisbane
- Established: 1882

Government
  - State electorate: Warrego
  - Federal division: Maranoa

Area
  - Total: 8,544.7 km^{2} (3,299.1 sq mi)

Population
  - Total: 16 (2021 census)
  - Density: 0.00187/km^{2} (0.00485/sq mi)
- Time zone: UTC+10:00 (AEST)
- Postcode: 4492
Localities around Noccundra
Durham	Eromanga	Eromanga
Cameron Corner	Noccundra	Thargomindah
Cameron Corner	Bulloo Downs	Bulloo Downs

Noccundra is an outback town and locality in the Shire of Bulloo in South West Queensland, Australia. The town was previously known as Nocundra. Prior to 2020 the locality was previously known as Nockatunga. In the 2021 census, the locality of Noccundra had a population of 16 people.

== Geography ==
The Wilson River is an intermittent braided river which enters the locality from the north (Eromanga) and exits to the west (Durham) where it becomes a tributary of Cooper Creek within the Lake Eyre drainage basin.

The town is in the centre of the locality just north of the Wilson River, 140 kilometres (87 mi) west of Thargomindah Apart from the town, the entire locality is contained within the pastoral holding of Nockatunga Station.

The land use is grazing on native vegetation.

== History ==
The name Noccundra comes from the pastoral run, name in 1866, derived from the Aboriginal words nocka meaning water and tunga meaning smell.

In 1874, Andrew Hume led an expedition to rescue a man that he claimed was a long-term survivor of Leichhardt's 1848 expedition. Hume perished of thirst to the west of Noccundra.

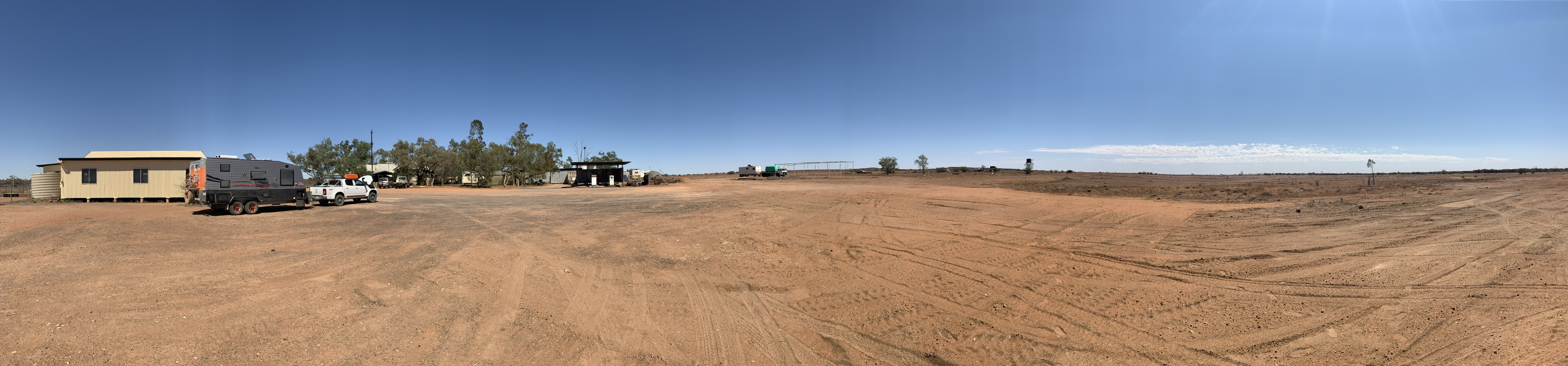
Town of Noccundra, 2019

The town was established in 1882 with the construction of the Noccundra Hotel which is also known as the Noccundra Pub. The hotel is constructed of sandstone mined from Mount Poole, New South Wales and brought to Noccundra by camel train.

Noccundra was spelt Nocundra originally, and its post office under that name opened on 11 October 1890 (a receiving office had been open from 1889) and closed in 1933.

On 17 April 2020, the Queensland Government reorganised the nine localities in the Shire, resulting in six localities. As part of these changes the locality of Nockatunga was renamed Noccundra after the only town in the locality.

== Demographics ==
In the 2016 census, the locality of Nockatunga had a population of 11 people.

In the 2021 census, the locality of Noccundra had a population of 16 people.

== Education ==
There are no schools in Noccundra nor nearby. The alternatives are distance education and boarding school.

== Amenities ==
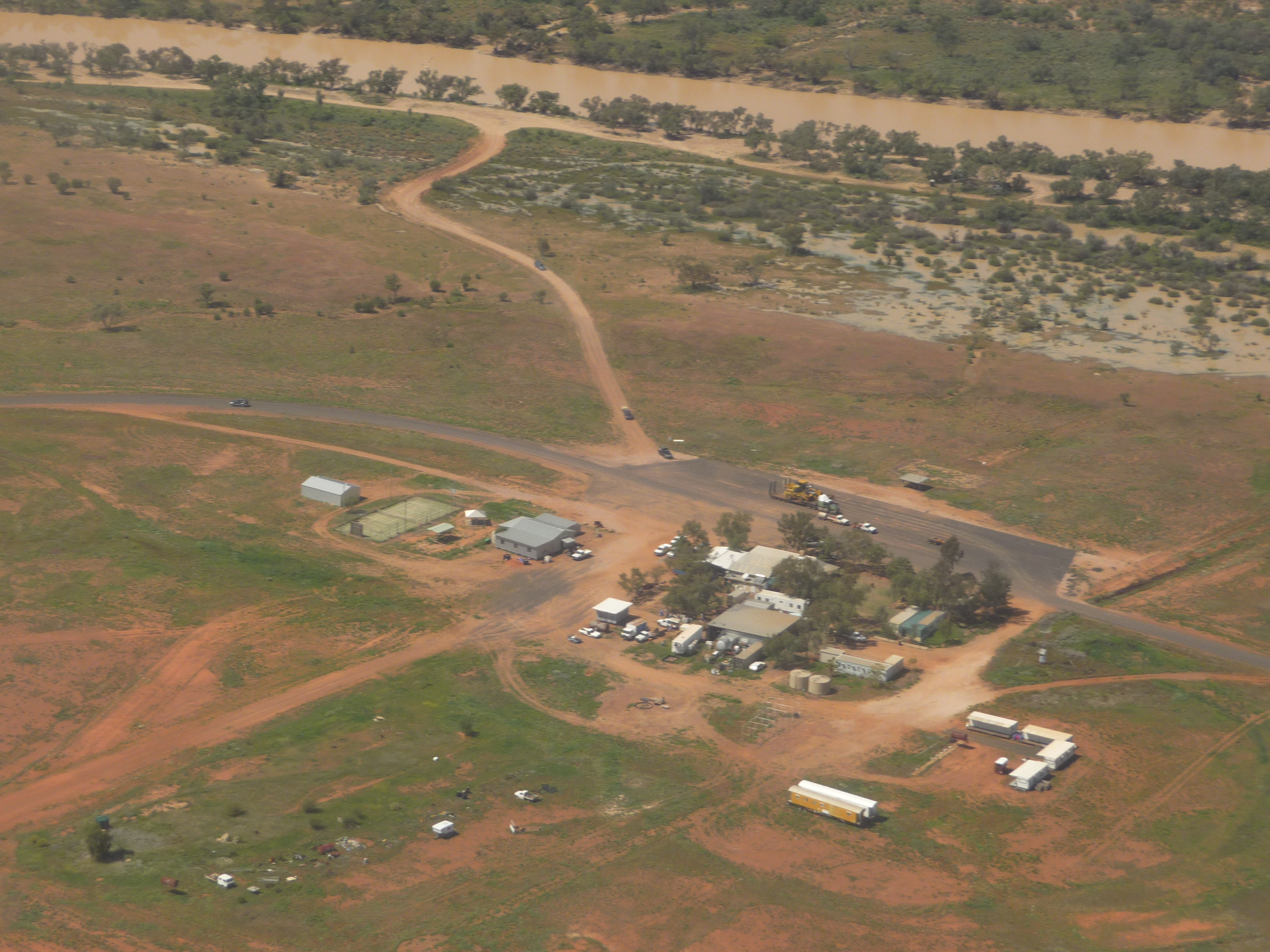
Aerial view of Noccundra, 2010

The Noccundra Hotel in Wilson Street is Noccundra's only occupied building, housing a permanent population of three. The stone hotel building is heritage-listed, and is an important building for its long connection with the community of the surrounding area as a venue for many social events, including the Noccundra Rodeo and Bi-annual Ball.

A memorial to Andrew Hume is on the western side of the hotel.

An airstrip is behind the hotel.
