= Bulloo Downs Station =

Pastoral lease in Queensland, Australia

Coordinates: 28.52704°S 142.96090°E

- Country: Australia
- State: Queensland
- LGA: Bulloo Shire
- Location: 125 km (78 mi) from Thargomindah
- Established: 1894

Government
  - State electorate: Warrego
  - Federal division: Maranoa
- Postcode: 4492

Location in Queensland

Bulloo Downs Station, most commonly referred to as Bulloo Downs, is a pastoral lease that operates as a cattle station in the Shire of Bulloo, Queensland, Australia. It is located on the traditional lands of the Bitjara.

It is situated about 136 kilometres (85 mi) north east east of Tibooburra and 151 kilometres (94 mi) west of Hungerford in the Channel Country of south west Queensland. The property encompasses a portion of the Bulloo River and its floodplains. The property adjoins Naryilco Station.

The property occupies an area of 10,700 square kilometres (4,131 sq mi) and in 2010 was owned by the Gibson family. Mick and Marie Gibson acquired Bulloo Downs in 2004 paying A$20 million for the property following the breakup of the Stanbroke Pastoral Company by Peter Menegazzo.

== History ==
In 1894 the property was owned by Messrs. Jones, Green and Sullivan and was carrying 43,000 head of cattle. The property was then struck by drought for a year, and the herd was reduced to 14,000 head. The cattle bred up to a herd of 18,000, then another even longer-lasting drought reduced the herd to 2,700 head in 1900. Sir Sidney Kidman acquired the property in 1903 for £20,000 when it was stocked with only 3,000 head of cattle. At this time the station occupied an area of 3,800 square miles (9,842 km^{2}) and was part of Kidman's expansive empire.

== See also ==
- List of ranches and stations
