= Shire of Bulloo =

Coordinates: 27°40′16.91″S 142°24′17.14″E

- Local government area
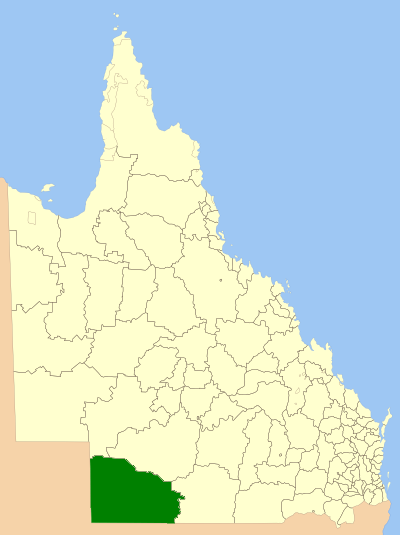
- Location in Queensland

- Interactive map of Shire of Bulloo
- Country: Australia
- State: Queensland
- Established: 1880; 146 years ago
- Council seat: Thargomindah

Government
  - Mayor: John Ferguson
  - State electorate: Warrego
  - Federal division: Maranoa

Area
  - Total: 73,724 km^{2} (28,465 sq mi)

Population
  - Total: 337 (2021 census)
  - Density: 0.004571/km^{2} (0.011839/sq mi)
- Website: Shire of Bulloo
LGAs around Shire of Bulloo
Barcoo	Quilpie	Quilpie
Outback Areas (SA)	Shire of Bulloo	Paroo
Far West (NSW)	Far West (NSW)	Far West (NSW)

The Shire of Bulloo (/ˈbʊluː/ BUUL-oo) is a local government area in South West Queensland, Australia.

On 17 April 2020 the Queensland Government reorganised the nine localities in the Shire, resulting in six localities by making the following changes:

- Thargomindah, previously being the surrounding area around the town of Thargomindah, was enlarged through the incorporation of most of Bullawarra (except for a small portion in the south of Bullawarra), all of Dynevor and all of Norley.
- Bulloo Downs gained the small portion from the south of Bullawarra (the rest being incorporated into Thargomindah) and lost a small portion of its western land to the locality of Cameron Corner.
- Cameron Corner gained a small portion of land from the west of the Bulloo Downs.
- Nockatunga was renamed Noccundra after the only town in the locality.

There were no changes to the localities of Durham and Hungerford.

In the 2021 census, the Shire of Bulloo had a population of 337 people.

== Geography ==
The Shire is located where New South Wales, Queensland and South Australia meet. In the south west corner of the shire, Cameron Corner is the point on the borders of all three states. The Bulloo Shire covers an area of 73,724 square kilometres (28,465 sq mi), and its administrative centre is the town of Thargomindah.

Major industries in the shire include wool, beef, opals, oil and natural gas.

== History ==
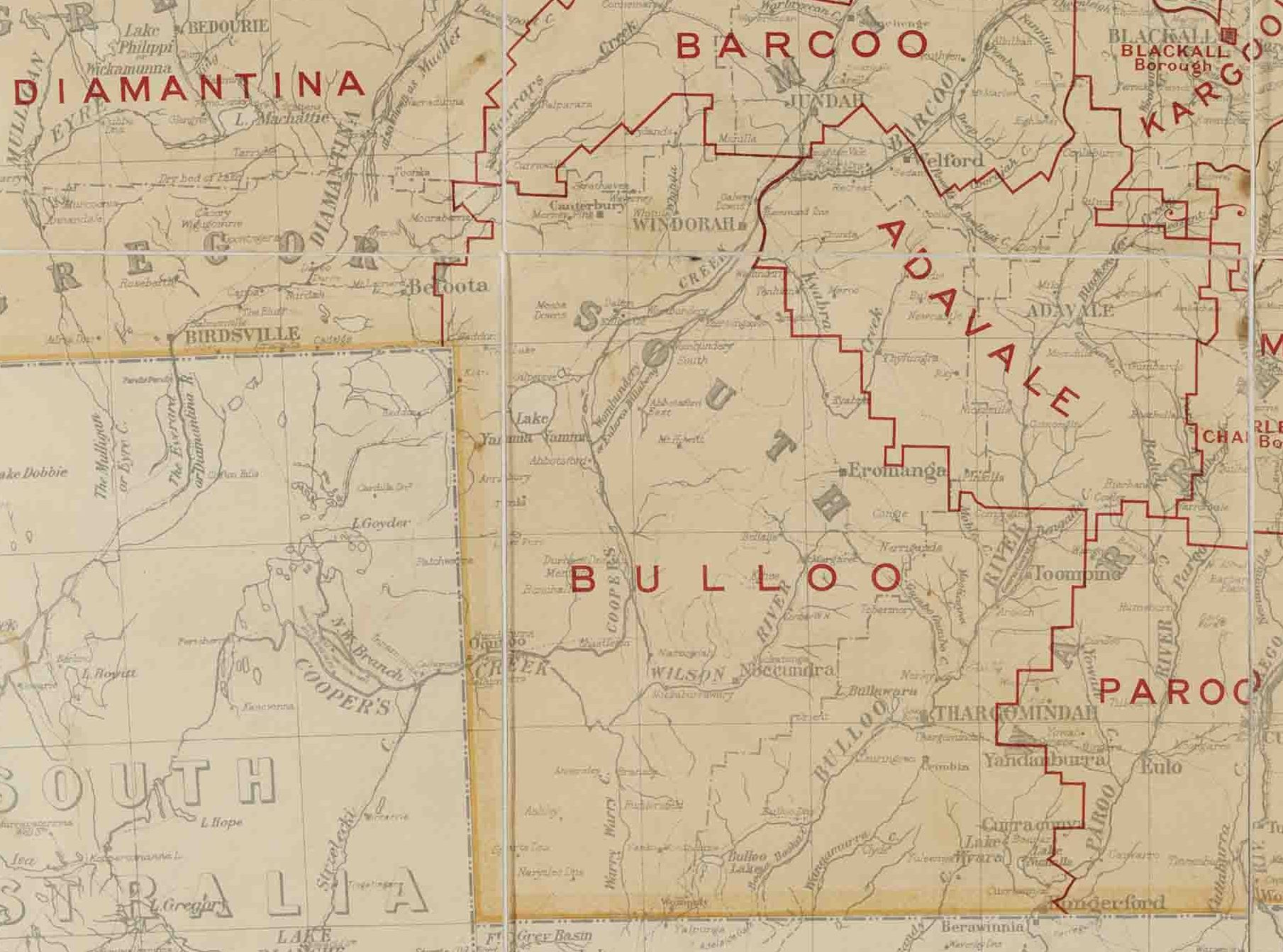
Map of Bulloo Division and adjacent local government areas, March 1902

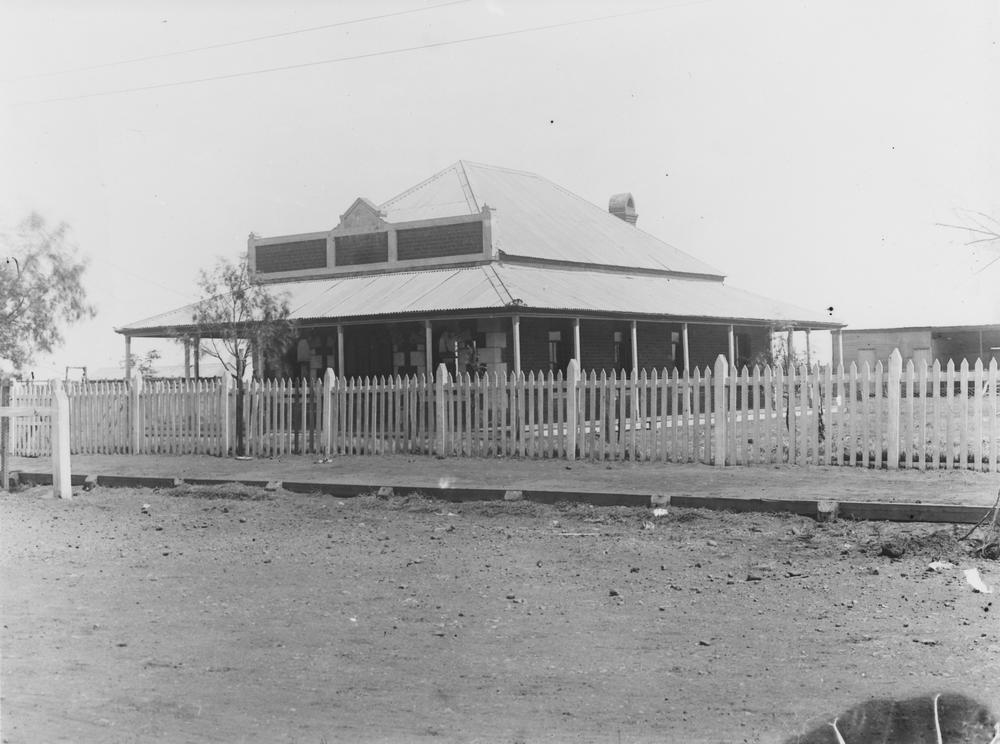
Shire Hall, Thargomindah, circa 1893

The Shire's traditional land owners were the Galali people.

Paroo Division was established on 11 November 1879 as one of the original divisions proclaimed under the Divisional Boards Act 1879. On 3 June 1880, the western part of the Paroo Division was separated to create the Bulloo Division.

On 21 June 1883, the boundaries between Diamantina Division and Bulloo Division were adjusted.

With the passage of the Local Authorities Act 1902, Bulloo Division became the Shire of Bulloo on 31 March 1903.

On 17 July 1930, the Shire of Bulloo was amalgamated with the Shire of Adavale, part of the Shire of Barcoo, part of the Shire of Murweh and part of the Shire of Paroo to create the Shire of Quilpie.

However, on 4 July 1931 the part of Quilpie Shire that previous constituted Bulloo was reconstituted as Bulloo Shire.

On 17 April 2020, the Queensland Government reorganised the nine localities in the Shire, resulting in six localities by making the following changes:

- Thargomindah, previously being the surrounding area around the town of Thargomindah, was enlarged through the incorporation of most of Bullawarra (except for a small portion in the south of Bullawarra), all of Dynevor and all of Norley
- Bulloo Downs gained the small portion from the south of Bullawarra (the rest being incorporated into Thargomindah) and lost a small portion of its western land to the locality of Cameron Corner
- Cameron Corner gained a small portion of land from the west of the Bulloo Downs
- Nockatunga was renamed Noccundra after the only town in the locality

There were no changes to the localities of Durham and Hungerford.

== Towns and localities ==
The Shire of Bulloo includes the following towns and localities:

- Thargomindah (town and locality)
- Bulloo Downs (locality)
- Cameron Corner (locality)
- Durham (locality) containing the abandoned town of Oontoo
- Hungerford (town and locality)
- Noccundra (town and locality)

Since April 2020, there are three former localities and one former locality name:

- Bullawarra (former locality)
- Dynevor (former locality)
- Nockatunga (former locality name)
- Norley (former locality)

== Amenities ==
Bulloo Shire Council operates a public library in Thargomindah.

== Chairmen and mayors ==
- 1927: J. Cordner
- 2008–present: John Charles Sidney (Tractor) Ferguson

== Demographics ==
Year	Population	Notes
1933	614	
1947	540	
1954	672	
1961	772	
1966	658	
1971	575	
1976	521	
1981	492	
1986	675	
1991	799	
1996	801	
2001 census	724	
2006 census	370	
2011 census	403	
2016 census	353	
2021 census	337	
