= Bulloo River =

River in Queensland, Australia

Coordinates: 28°43′S 142°30′E

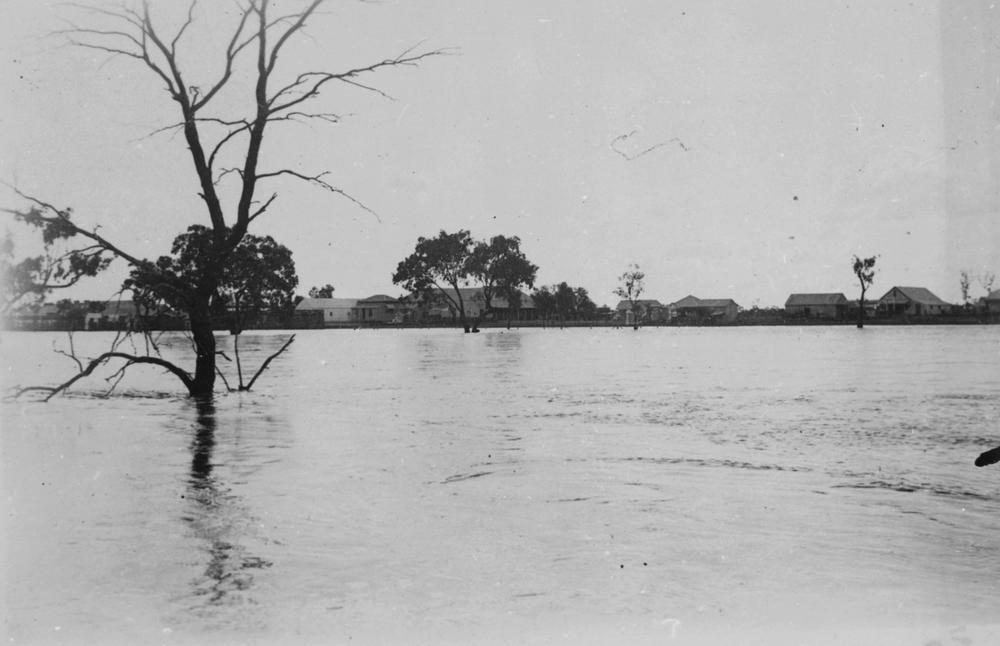
- Bulloo River in flood at Adavale, Queensland

Location
- Country: Australia
- State: Queensland
- District: Shire of Bulloo
- City: Adavale, Thargomindah

Physical characteristics
- Source: Grey Range, Idalia National Park
  - location: western Queensland
  - elevation: 290 m (950 ft)
- Mouth: Bulloo Lake (ephemeral)
- Length: 600 km (370 mi)
- Basin size: 75,534 km^{2} (29,164 sq mi)
- Discharge
  - average: 20 m^{3}/s (710 cu ft/s)(River usually dry)

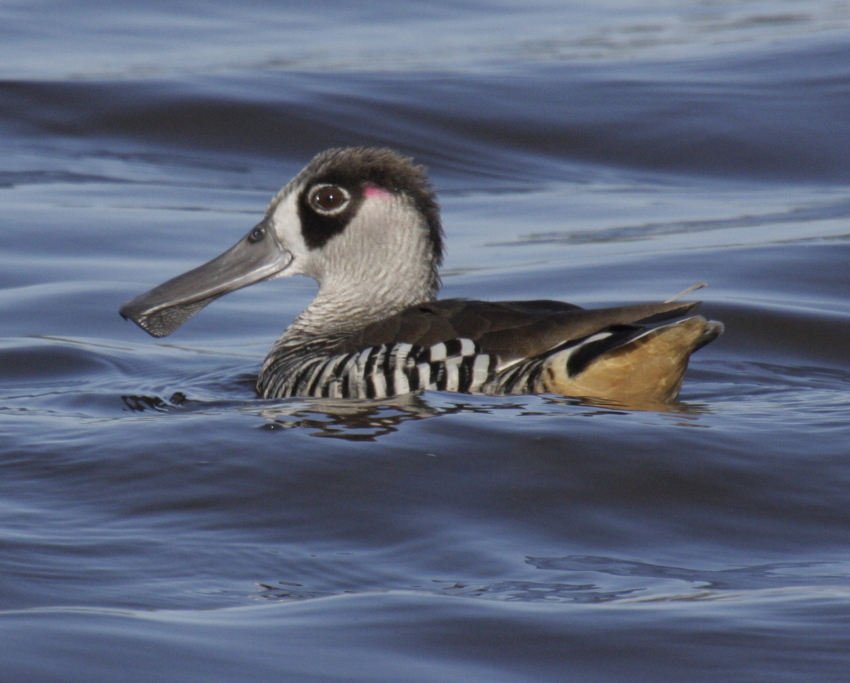
The floodplain of the Bulloo is an important breeding area for pink-eared ducks when inundated

The Bulloo River /ˈbʊluː/ BUUL-oo is an isolated drainage system in western Queensland, central Australia. Its floodplain, which extends into northern New South Wales, is an important area for waterbirds when inundated. It comprises most of the Bulloo-Bancannia drainage basin.

== History ==
The traditional owners of the area are the Kalili people. Kalili (also known as Galali, Kalali, Kunja, Kurnja, Galili, Kullalli, Ngura) is an Australian Aboriginal language spoken by the Kalili people. The Kullili language region includes the landscape within the local government boundaries of the Paroo Shire and Bulloo Shire, taking in Eulo and extending west towards Thargomindah taking in the properties of Bulloo Downs and Currawinya.

== Geography ==
The Bulloo is the only river in the region not part of either the Murray–Darling basin or the Lake Eyre basin; instead it flows into several ephemeral lakes which are blocked by low hills from reaching the Lake Frome, the Paroo River or the Lake Bancannia systems. In its lowest reaches, which extend to near Tibooburra, New South Wales, is the distributary known as Bella Creek. It is believed that in past wet periods the Bulloo has had connections to Lake Frome because its fish fauna resembles that of the Lake Eyre basin rather than that of the Murray–Darling basin. Several tributaries flow into the Bulloo in its upper reaches, the largest being Blackwater Creek. Ranges of low hills prevent the lower reaches of the Bulloo from receiving significant tributaries.

== Climate and hydrology ==
Annual rainfall throughout the basin ranges from 330 millimetres or 13 inches in the north to 200 millimetres or 8 inches in the south, with the northward increase being due to higher falls in the summer. In the winter, rainfall is rare throughout the basin, with the average between April and October generally around 115 millimetres or 4.5 inches, though on extremely rare occasions such as 1920–1921 and 1956 the river has had a significant flood during the winter. Temperatures in the summer are extreme throughout except during monsoonal activity, with mean maxima around 38 °C or 100 °F in January and minima around 23 °C or 73 °F. In the winter maxima remain warm, ranging from 20 °C or 68 °F in the south to 25 °C or 77 °F in the north, but frosts are not unknown at night.

Hydrologically, the Bulloo is very similar to the Darling River and Cooper Creek. It is usually completely dry except for water holes, but during years of strong monsoonal activity in the summer the Bulloo can flood heavily to discharges of more than 1000 m³/s, and annual flows of up to five times the mean. In dry years annual rainfall can be as low as 100 millimetres or 4 inches throughout the basin and years of zero runoff are not unknown.

The basin was flooded in the March 2010 Queensland floods and again in the floods of early 2012.

== Environment ==
The Bulloo basin is used almost exclusively for the extensive grazing of sheep and cattle. The only towns within the basin are the former opal mining town of Quilpie and, further downstream, Thargomindah. There is only one major protected area, Idalia National Park, in the entire basin, located in the river's headwaters.

The Bulloo floodplain, with an area of about 9,240 square kilometres or 3,570 square miles, is classified by BirdLife International as an Important Bird Area. When it floods the site supports several hundred thousand waterbirds, with over 1% of the populations of red-necked avocet, grey teal, Australasian shoveler, Pink-eared duck and freckled duck. It also contains the entire population of a subspecies of the grey grasswren.
