= Farrars Creek, Queensland =

Farrars Creek
- Suburb
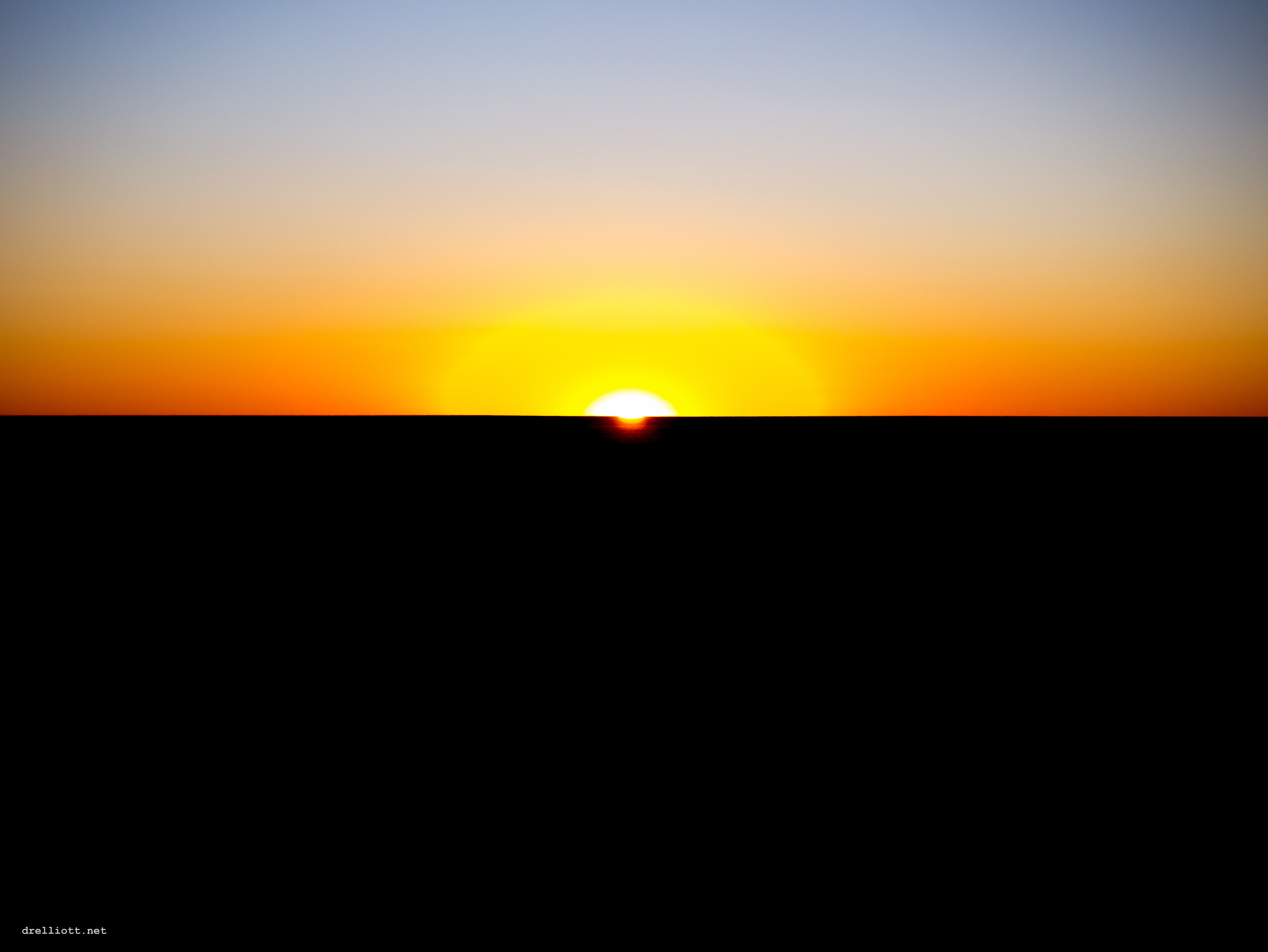
- Sunset from Davenport Road, Farrars Creek, 2015

- Interactive map of Farrars Creek
- Coordinates: 25.2419°S 141.5355°E
- Country: Australia
- State: Queensland
- LGA: Shire of Barcoo
- Location: 164 km (102 mi) WNW of Windorah; 261 km (162 mi) W of Jundah; 479 km (298 mi) SW of Longreach; 1,559 km (969 mi) WNW of Brisbane

Government
  - State electorate: Gregory
  - Federal division: Maranoa

Area
  - Total: 13,431.4 km^{2} (5,185.9 sq mi)

Population
  - Total: 0 (2021 census)
  - Density: 0.00000/km^{2} (0.00000/sq mi)
- Time zone: UTC+10:00 (AEST)
- Postcode: 4481
Suburbs around Farrars Creek
Diamantina Lakes	Diamantina Lakes	Stonehenge
Bedourie	Farrars Creek	Jundah
Birdsville	Tanbar	Windorah

Farrars Creek is a rural locality in the Shire of Barcoo, Queensland, Australia. In the 2021 census, Farrars Creek had "no people or a very low population".

== Geography ==
The watercourse Farrars Creek flows through the locality from the north-east (Stonehenge) to the south-west, where it becomes a tributary of the Diamantina River, part of the Lake Eyre drainage basin.

The Diamantina Developmental Road passes through the locality from the south-east (Windorah) to west (Bedourie). The Birdsville Developmental Road passes through the locality from the south-east (Windorah) to the south (Tanbar).

The principal land use is grazing on native vegetation.

== History ==
Karuwali (also known as Garuwali, Dieri) is a language of far western Queensland. The Karuwali language region includes the landscape within the local government boundaries of the Diamantina Shire Council, including the localities of Betoota and Haddon Corner.

The locality takes its name from the creek, which in turn takes its name after a stockman called Farrar who was employed on John Costello's pastoral property Kyabra.

== Demographics ==
In the 2016 census, Farrars Creek had "no people or a very low population".

In the 2021 census, Farrars Creek had "no people or a very low population".

== Education ==
There are no schools in Farrars Creek nor nearby. The options are distance education and boarding school.
