= Tanbar County, Queensland =

Tanbar County Queensland
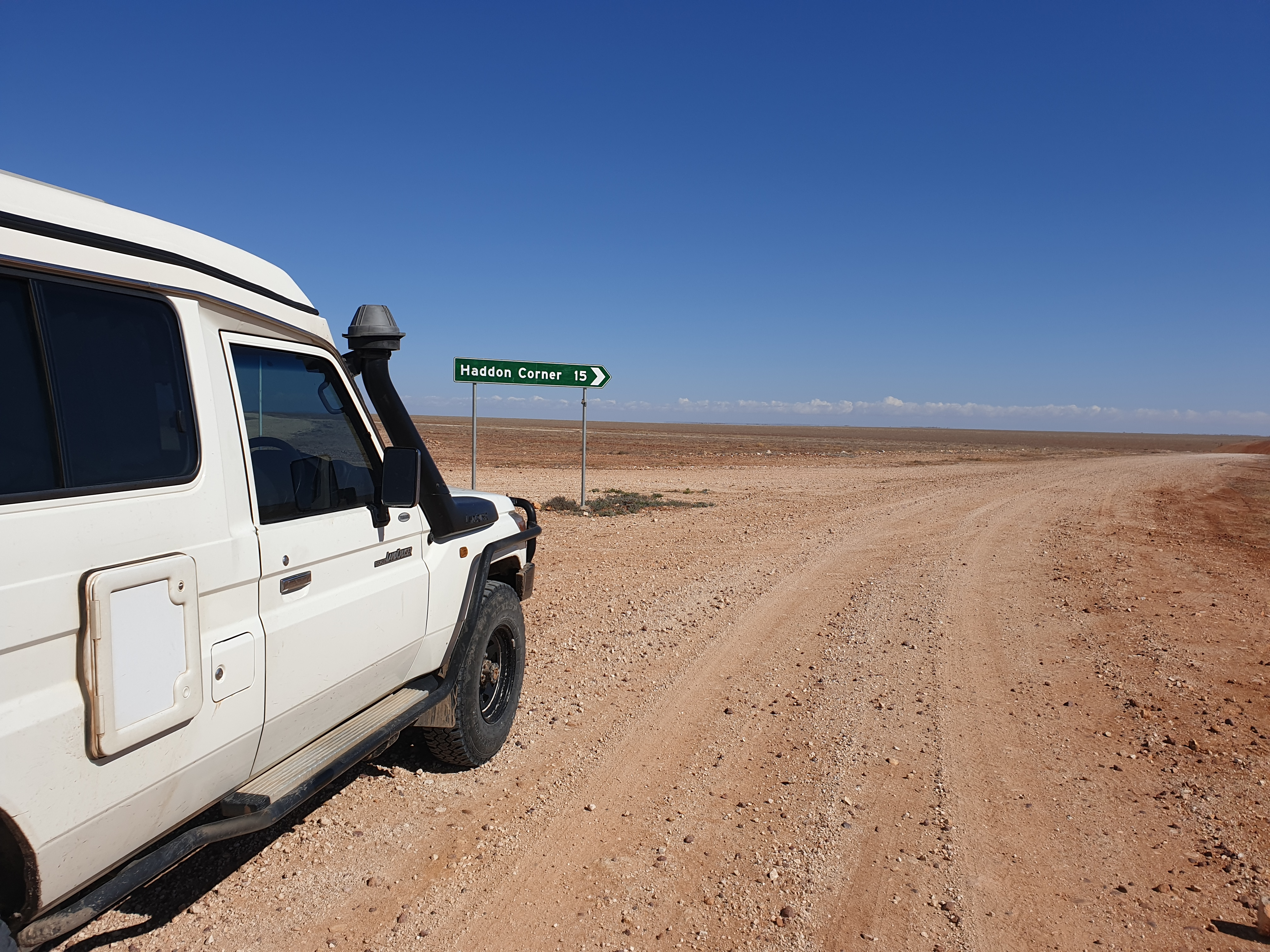
- Turn-off from Arrabury Road to Haddon Corner, 2019

- Coordinates: 26°10′14″S 141°32′02″E
- Postcode(s): 4481
- LGA(s): Shire of Barcoo
- State electorate(s): Gregory
- Federal division(s): Maranoa

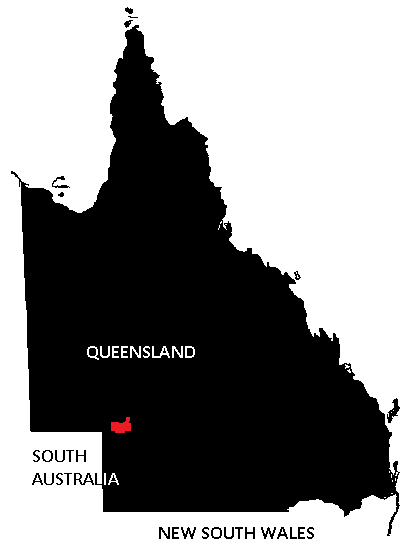
Tanbar_County_Queensland_4

Tanbar County is a cadastral division of Queensland and a county of the South Gregory District of far western Queensland.

The county came into existence on 8 March 1901, when the Governor of Queensland issued a proclamation legally dividing Queensland into counties under the Land Act 1897. Like all counties in Queensland, it is a non-functional administrative unit, that is used mainly for the purpose of registering land titles. From 30 November 2015, the government no longer referenced counties and parishes in land information systems however the Museum of Lands, Mapping and Surveying retains a record for historical purposes.

The center of local government for the County is Jundah, Queensland to the north, the only town of the county is Windorah, Queensland and the postcode is 4481. The county is named for the Tanbar Billabong.

== See also ==
- Tanbar, Queensland
