= Thomson Developmental Road =

Road in Queensland, Australia

Thomson Developmental Road Queensland
- Thomson Developmental Road (green and black)

General information
- Type: Rural road
- Length: 319 km (198 mi)
- Route number(s): National Route 79

Major junctions
- North-east end: Landsborough Highway
- South-west end: State Route 14 (Diamantina Developmental Road)

Location(s)
- Major settlements: Jundah

The Thomson Developmental Road is a designated sealed road which runs from Longreach to Windorah in Queensland, Australia. The length is 319 kilometres (198 mi), and it is the only surviving section of National Route 79, which originally ran from Melbourne to Longreach, but the Victorian and New South Wales sections have been replaced with alphanumeric route numbers.

== Route ==
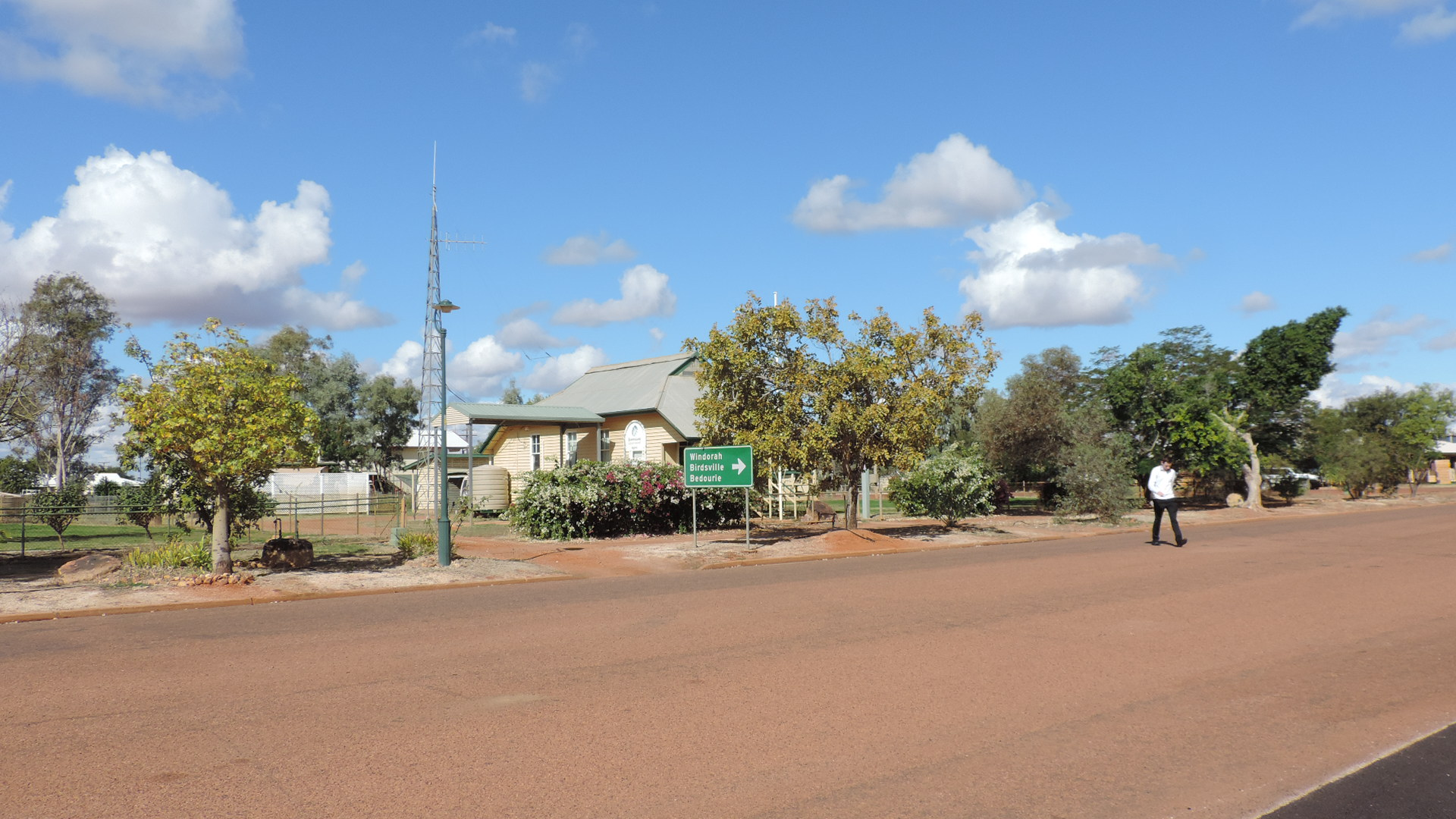
Thomson Developmental Road passing through Jundah with turn-off to Windorah, 2019

Towns en route are Stonehenge and Jundah, and the road crosses the Thomson River just west of Jundah. The road has no major intersections.

== See also ==
- Highways in Australia
- List of highways in Queensland
