= Diamantina Lakes, Queensland =

Diamantina Lakes
- Suburb
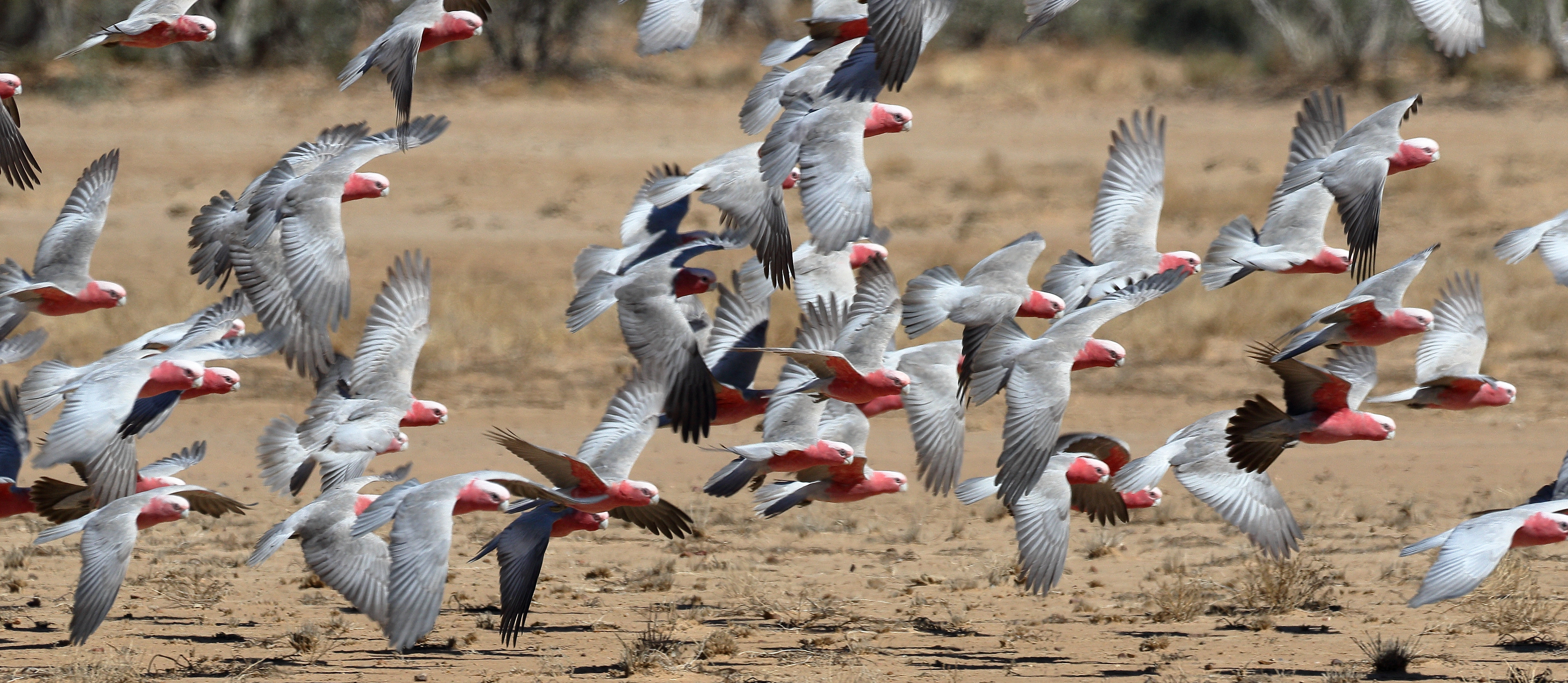
- Flock of galahs, Dimantina National Park, 2017

- Interactive map of Diamantina Lakes
- Coordinates: 23.9413°S 141.2447°E
- Country: Australia
- State: Queensland
- LGA: Shire of Diamantina
- Location: 201 km (125 mi) SE of Boulia; 311 km (193 mi) SW of Winton; 417 km (259 mi) NE of Birdsville; 1,536 km (954 mi) WNW of Brisbane

Government
  - State electorate: Gregory
  - Federal division: Maranoa

Area
  - Total: 23,880.4 km^{2} (9,220.3 sq mi)

Population
  - Total: 0 (2021 census)
  - Density: 0.000000/km^{2} (0.00000/sq mi)
- Postcode: 4735
Suburbs around Diamantina Lakes
| Min Min | Middleton | Opalton |
| Bedourie | Diamantina Lakes | Stonehenge |
| Farrars Creek | Bedourie | Farrars Creek |

Diamantina Lakes is an outback locality in the Shire of Diamantina, Queensland, Australia. In the 2021 census, Diamantina Lakes had "no people or a very low population".

== Geography ==
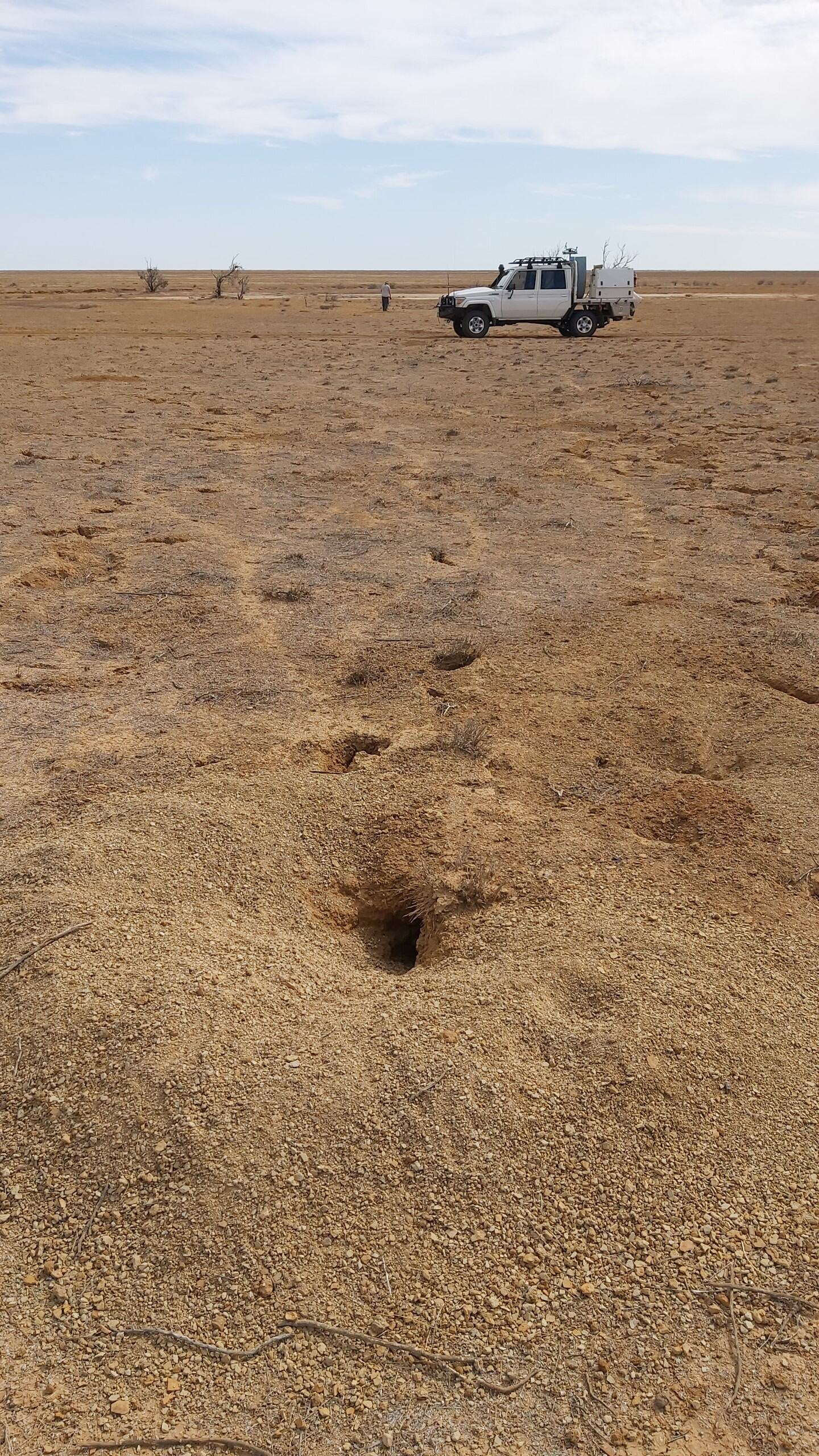
Greater bilby active burrow, Astrebla Downs National Park, 2024

Diamantina Lakes is part of the Channel Country which is an arid landscape with a series of ancient flood plains from rivers which only flow intermittently. When there is water in it, the Diamantina River flows from north to south through the locality eventually destined for Lake Eyre in South Australia. However, the water usually evaporates and is absorbed into the earth before reaching Lake Eyre.

The Diamantina National Park is in the north-east of the locality and the Astrebla Downs National Park is in the south-west of the locality. Apart from these protected areas, the land use is grazing on native vegetation.

== History ==
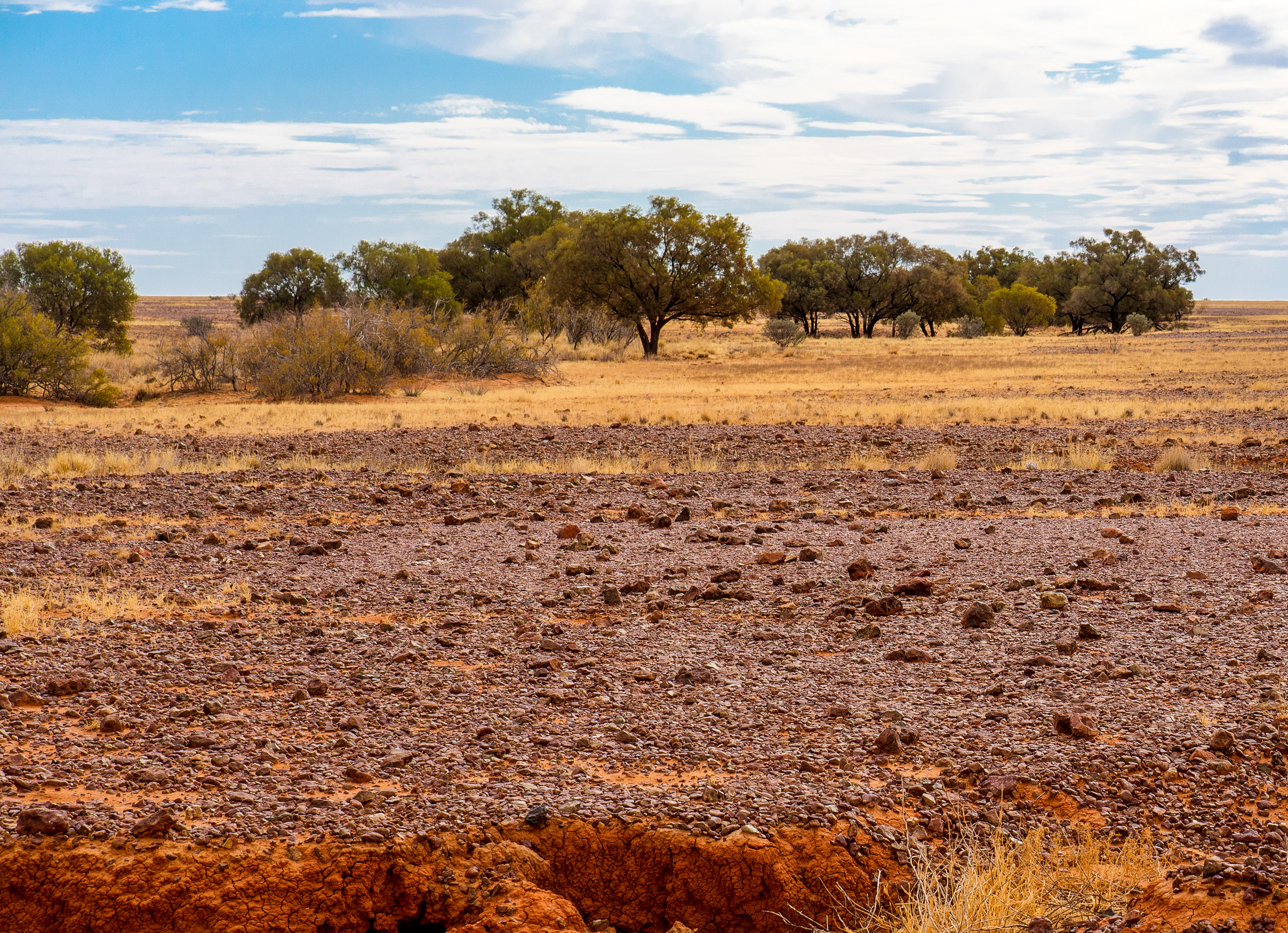
Former Diamantina Lakes pastoral station, 2015

The Diamantina Lakes pastoral station was established in 1875. The pastoral station was capable of holding up to 12,000 head of cattle.In 1992, the property was purchased by the Queensland Government which subsequently gazetted the 5,070 km^{2} (1,958 sq mi) property as the Diamantina National Park. A number of stock routes still exist through the national park.

== Demographics ==
In the 2016 census, Diamantina Lakes had a population of 17 people.

In the 2021 census, Diamantina Lakes had "no people or a very low population".

== Heritage listings ==
The heritage listings for Diamantina Lakes includes:

- Elizabeth Springs, an artesian spring from the Great Artesian Basin

== Education ==
There are no schools in the locality, nor nearby. The alternatives are distance education and boarding school.
