= Lake Bindegolly National Park =

National park in Queensland, Australia

- IUCN category II (national park)
- Location within Queensland
- Location: Queensland
- Nearest city: Thargomindah
- Coordinates: 28°00′48″S 144°11′37″E
- Area: 140 km^{2} (54 sq mi)
- Established: 1991
- Governing body: Queensland Parks and Wildlife Service
- Website: Official website

Lake Bindegolly is a national park in Dynevor, Shire of Bulloo, South West Queensland, Australia, 871 km west of Brisbane and 40 km from the town of Thargomindah. It is in the Mulga Lands bioregion and was established to protect a population of the rare plant Acacia ammophila. It has three lakes, two saline and one freshwater.

== Birds ==
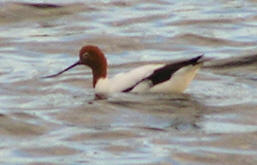
The lake is an important site for red-necked avocets

A 318 km^{2} area of the lake and its surroundings has been identified by BirdLife International as an Important Bird Area (IBA) because it has supported over 1% of the world populations of blue-billed ducks and red-necked avocets as well as populations of the biome-restricted inland dotterel, Bourke's parrot, slaty-backed thornbill, grey-headed honeyeater, black honeyeater, pied honeyeater, Hall's babbler, chirruping wedgebill and chestnut-breasted quail-thrush.

== See also ==
- List of lakes of Australia
- Protected areas of Queensland
