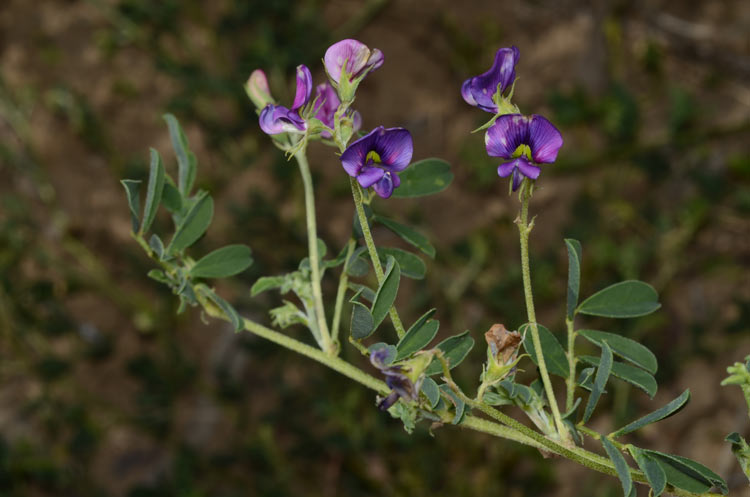
- In Welford National Park

Scientific classification
- Kingdom: Plantae
- Clade: Tracheophytes
- Clade: Angiosperms
- Clade: Eudicots
- Clade: Rosids
- Order: Fabales
- Family: Fabaceae
- Subfamily: Faboideae
- Genus: Swainsona
- Species: S. oligophylla

Binomial name
- Swainsona oligophylla F.Muell. ex Benth.

Synonyms
- Swainsona concinna F.M.Bailey; Swainsonia oligophylla F.Muell. orth. var.

= Swainsona oligophylla =

Species of legume

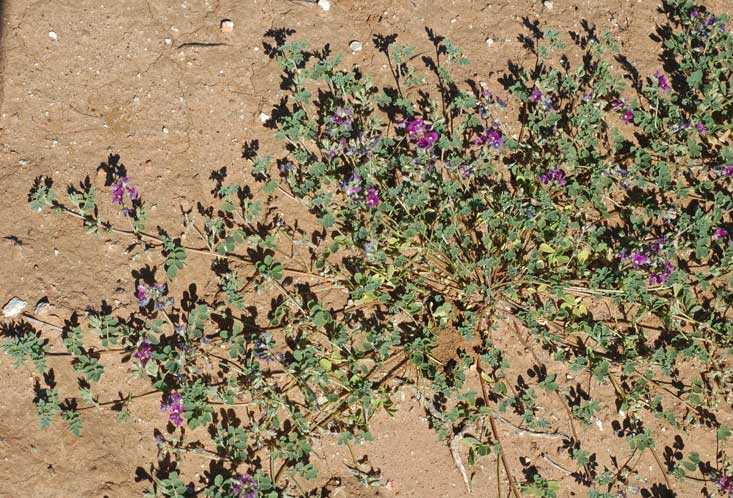
Habit in Sturt National Park

Swainsona oligophylla is a species of flowering plant in the family Fabaceae and is endemic to central Australia. It is usually a prostrate perennial plant with imparipinnate leaves with 5 to 7 egg-shaped leaflets, the narrower end towards the base, and racemes of 3 to 7 purple flowers.

== Description ==
Swainsona oligophylla is a prostrate or occasionally ascending annual perennial plant, that typically grows to a height of about 15 cm (5.9 in) and has many stems. The leaves are imparipinnate, mostly 10–40 mm (0.39–1.57 in) long with 5 to 7 egg-shaped leaflets with the narrower end towards the base, mostly 2–15 mm (0.079–0.591 in) long and 1–8 mm (0.039–0.315 in) wide with stipules about 3 mm (0.12 in) long at the base of the petioles. The flowers are purple, arranged in racemes of 3 to 7, 20–100 mm (0.79–3.94 in) long, on a peduncle up to 0.5 mm (0.020 in) long. The sepals are joined at the base to form a tube about 1.5 mm (0.059 in) long, with lobes 3 or 4 times longer than the tube. The standard petal is 8–10 mm (0.31–0.39 in) long, the wings about 7 mm (0.28 in) long and the keel about 8–9 mm (0.31–0.35 in) long and 2 mm (0.079 in) deep. Flowering usually occurs from August to October, and the fruit is a cylindrical pod 12–15 mm (0.47–0.59 in) long on a stalk about 1 mm (0.039 in) long, with the remains of the strongly curved style about 4 mm (0.16 in) long.

== Taxonomy and naming ==
Swainsona oligophylla was first formally described in 1864 by George Bentham in Flora Australiensis from an unpublished description by Ferdinand von Mueller. The specific epithet (oligophylla) means "few-leaved".

== Distribution ==
This species of swainsona is widespread in the south of the Northern Territory, north-eastern South Australia, south-western Queensland and north-western New South Wales, where it grows on clay-loam soils in well-watered areas.
