= Tanbar =

Tanbar may refer to:

- Tanbar Station, a pastoral lease in Queensland, Australia
- Tanbar, Queensland, an outback locality in the Shire of Barcoo, Queensland, Australia
