= Eyre Developmental Road =

Road in Queensland, Australia

Eyre Developmental Road Queensland
- Eyre Developmental Road (blue and white).

General information
- Type: Rural road
- Length: 200 km (124 mi)

Major junctions
- North end: Diamantina Developmental Road, Bedourie
- Birdsville Developmental Road
- South end: Birdsville Track, Birdsville

The Eyre Developmental Road is a gazetted road in south-west Queensland that runs from Bedourie to Birdsville and then to the border with South Australia, where it continues as the Birdsville Track. At the northern end it joins the Diamantina Developmental Road, and the mostly unsealed road crosses the Georgina River and Diamantina River. Maintenance of the road is the responsibility of the Queensland State Government. The road intersects with the Birdsville Developmental Road in Birdsville.

== Upgrades ==
=== Pave and seal ===
A project to pave and seal 20 kilometres (12 mi) of road south of Bedourie, at a cost of $10 million, was expected to complete in early 2022.

A project to pave and seal about 9 kilometres (5.6 mi) of road north of Birdsville, at a cost of $4.5 million, was expected to finish in late 2022.
