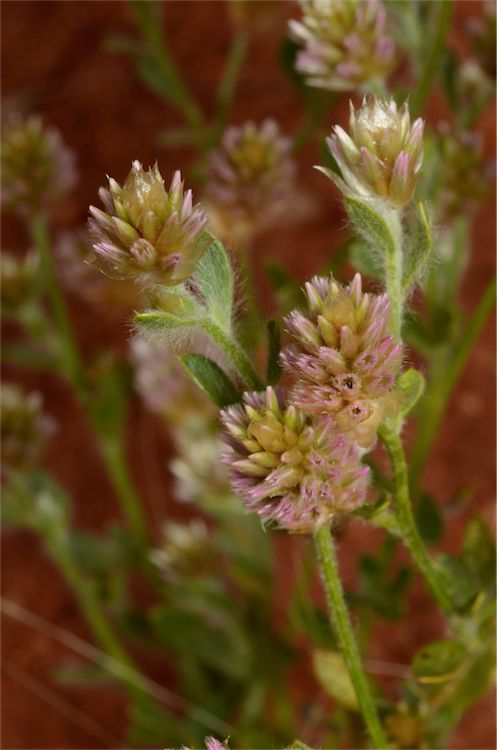

Conservation status
- Priority One — Poorly Known Taxa (DEC)

Scientific classification
- Kingdom: Plantae
- Clade: Tracheophytes
- Clade: Angiosperms
- Clade: Eudicots
- Order: Caryophyllales
- Family: Amaranthaceae
- Genus: Ptilotus
- Species: P. pseudohelipteroides

Binomial name
- Ptilotus pseudohelipteroides Benl

= Ptilotus pseudohelipteroides =

Species of plant

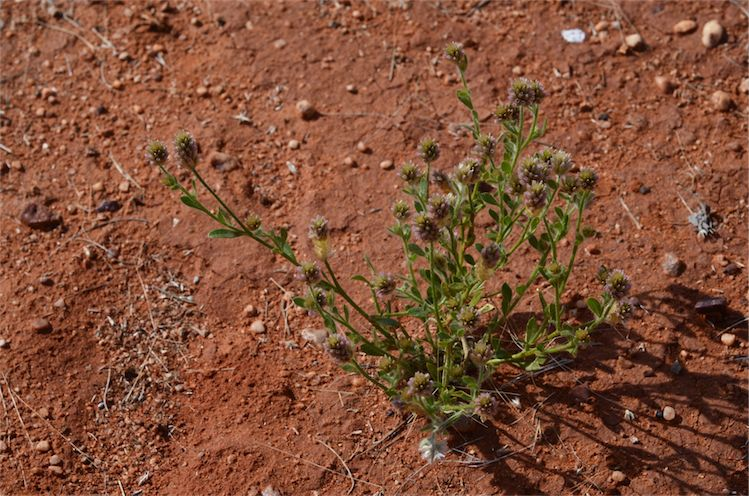
Habit in Welford National Park

Ptilotus pseudohelipteroides, commonly known as woolly mulla mulla or hairy mulla mulla, is a species of flowering plant of the family Amaranthaceae and is endemic to arid areas of inland Australia. It is a small, erect or prostrate annual herb with hairy leaves, pale yellow or straw-coloured flowers and orange-brown seeds.

== Description ==
Ptilotus pseudohelipteroides is a small erect or prostrate annual herb up to 20 cm (7.9 in) tall. Its leaves are covered with silvery, silky hairs, up to 30 mm (1.2 in) long and 5 mm (0.20 in) wide, narrowing to a petiole, with a prominent vein on the lower surface. The flowers are borne in many more or less spherical to oval spikes, 15 mm (0.59 in) long and 12 mm (0.47 in) wide, each with about 50 flowers on a hairy peduncle. The bracts and bracteoles are pale yellow to straw-coloured, 6 mm (0.24 in) long 2.5 mm (0.098 in) wide. Flowering occurs from April to October and the fruit is papery and hairy, containing a single small, kidney-shaped, orange-brown seed.

== Taxonomy ==
Ptilotus pseudohelipteroides was first formally described in 1983 by Gerhard Benl in the journal Muelleria from specimens collected near Currawilla in 1949. The specific epithet (pseudohelipteroides) means 'false Helipterum-like'. (The genus Helipterum is a synonym of Syncarpha.)

== Distribution and habitat ==
This species of Ptilotus grows on hard, bare, pebbly brown clay loam flats, gravelly rises and jump-ups in the south of the Northern Territory, Western Australia and Queensland.

== Conservation status ==
Ptilotus pseudohelipteroides is listed as of "least concern" under the Queensland Government Nature Conservation Act 1992 and the Northern Territory Territory Parks and Wildlife Conservation Act.
