= Welford Homestead =

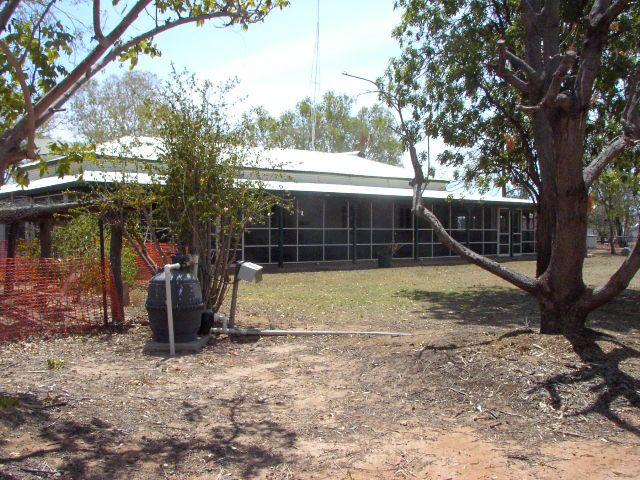
- Welford Homestead, 2005

- Location within Queensland
- 25.171424°S 143.334515°E
- Location: Welford National Park, Jundah, Shire of Barcoo, Queensland, Australia

Queensland Heritage Register
- Official name: Welford Homestead
- Type: state heritage
- Designated: 21 August 1992
- Reference no.: 600023

Welford Homestead is a heritage-listed homestead in the Welford National Park, Jundah, Shire of Barcoo, Queensland, Australia. It was added to the Queensland Heritage Register on 21 August 1992.

== History ==
The Walton pastoral run was taken up by Richard Welford in c. 1870, having migrated to Australia from Britain in 1863. Welford held the Walton run for only two years before he and his stockman, Henry Hall were murdered by aborigines in about May 1872. Welford was buried on the property with a marble headstone which said:

In memory of Richard Welford, B.A., Edinburgh, barrister of Lincoln's Inn, only son of Richard G. Welford, County Court Judge at Birmingham, England, murdered by blacks at Walton, 21st April, 1872, in the thirty third year of his age.

In August 1872, the property was sold to the Rome brothers, who, by 1875, were calling it Welford Downs.

The homestead is thought to be constructed in 1882–83 (at the time of Welford's murder there was only a hut).

In 1956, the homestead was destroyed by fire, and the roof was replaced with a flatter hip roof. Following heavy rain in 1963, the stone kitchen was demolished. In 1989, major renovations brought the building to its present state.

The homestead is now used as staff quarters for the Welford National Park.

== Heritage listing ==
Welford Homestead was listed on the Queensland Heritage Register on 21 August 1992 having satisfied the following criteria.

The place is important in demonstrating the evolution or pattern of Queensland's history.

Welford Homestead illustrates the early exploration and settlement of Queensland as pastoral land, later instrumental in the formation of towns throughout Queensland. Welford Homestead is constructed using the pise methods and is a rare surviving example of its type. It demonstrates a high degree of creative achievement in using natural resources for construction purposes. It has the potential to yield information through historical and archaeological research that will contribute to an understanding of Queensland's history. It is also an uncommon example of an intact homestead setting. As such, it demonstrates the principal characteristics of its class and contributes to an understanding of early station life. Welford Station has special associations with the community as one of the first stations in the region.
