= Tanbar, Queensland =

Tanbar
- Suburb
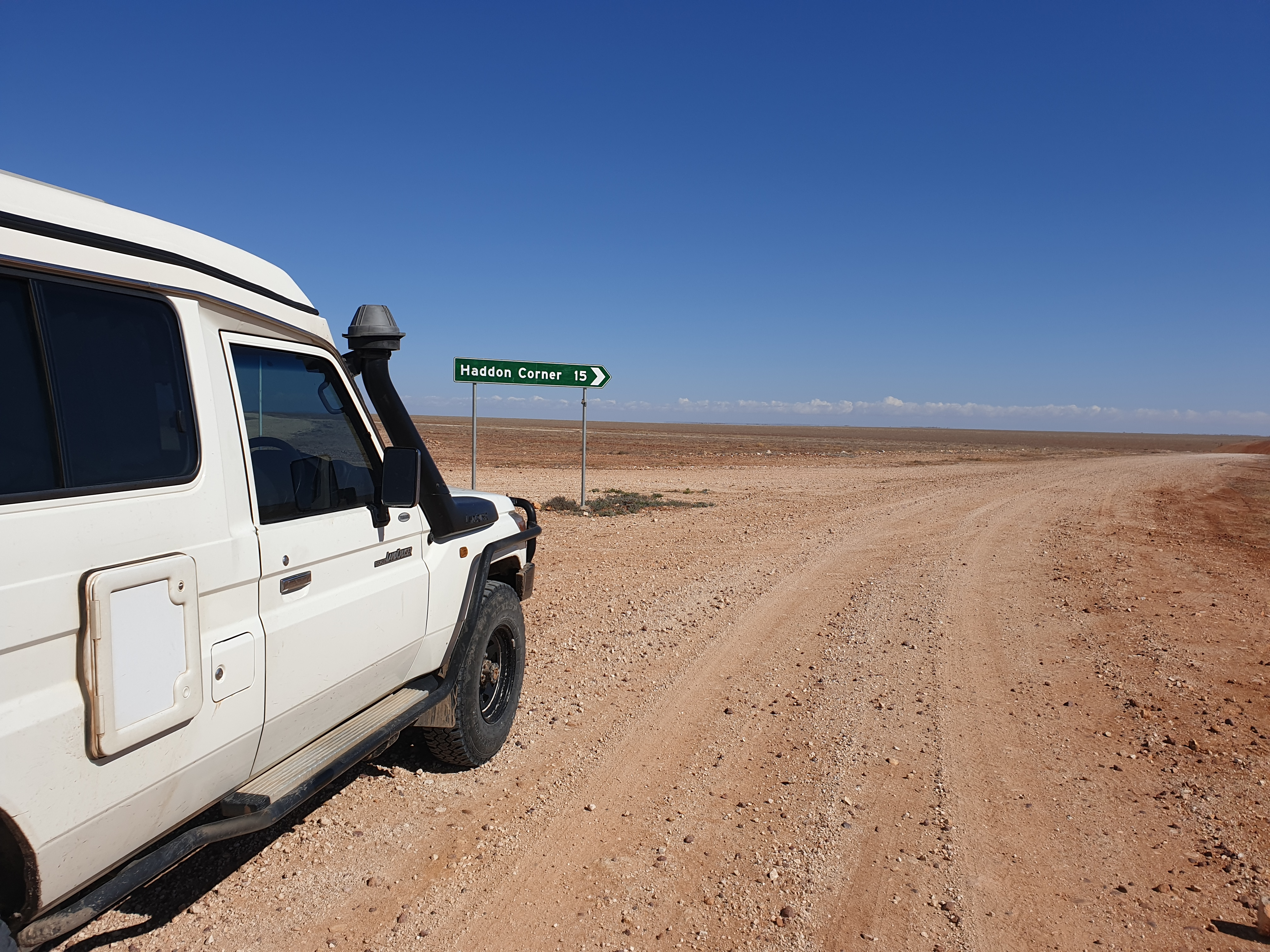
- Turn-off from Arrabury Road to Haddon Corner, 2019

- Interactive map of Tanbar
- Coordinates: 26.1708°S 141.5338°E
- Country: Australia
- State: Queensland
- LGA: Shire of Barcoo
- Location: 120 km (75 mi) SW of Windorah; 204 km (127 mi) SW of Jundah; 578 km (359 mi) W of Charleville; 844 km (524 mi) W of Roma; 1,323 km (822 mi) W of Brisbane

Government
  - State electorate: Gregory
  - Federal division: Maranoa

Area
  - Total: 11,465.6 km^{2} (4,426.9 sq mi)

Population
  - Total: 0 (2021 census)
  - Density: 0.00000/km^{2} (0.00000/sq mi)
- Time zone: UTC+10:00 (AEST)
- Postcode: 4481
Suburbs around Tanbar
Birdsville	Farrars Creek	Windorah
South Australia	Tanbar	Eromanga
South Australia	Durham	Durham

Tanbar is an outback locality in the Shire of Barcoo, Queensland, Australia. It is on the corner of Queensland's southern and western border with South Australia. In the 2021 census, Tanbar had "no people or a very low population".

== Geography ==
Haddon Corner is the point of Queensland's southern and western border with South Australia (26.0000°S 141.0000°E). It is in the south-west of the locality.

Lake Yamma Yamma (also known as Lake Mackillop) is in the centre of the locality (26.3333°S 141.4166°E). It is 736 square kilometres (284 sq mi) and is ephemeral, holding water only when Cooper Creek floods. It rarely fills (about every 25 to 30 years). It is Queensland's largest ephemeral lake.

The Birdsville Developmental Road enters the locality from the north (Farrars Creek), passes through the north of the locality, and exits to the north-west (Birdsville). Arrabury Road branches off from the Birdsville Developmental Road shortly after it enters the locality and then proceeds south-west and then south into Durham (remaining west of Lake Yamma Yamma).

The land use is grazing on native vegetation.

== History ==
The name Haddon Corner is derived from Haddon Downs, the pastoral property in the corner on the South Australian side. It was established in 1877 by pastoralists William and John Howie.

== Demographics ==
In the 2016 census, Tanbar had a population of 3 people.

In the 2021 census, Tanbar had "no people or a very low population".

== Heritage listings ==
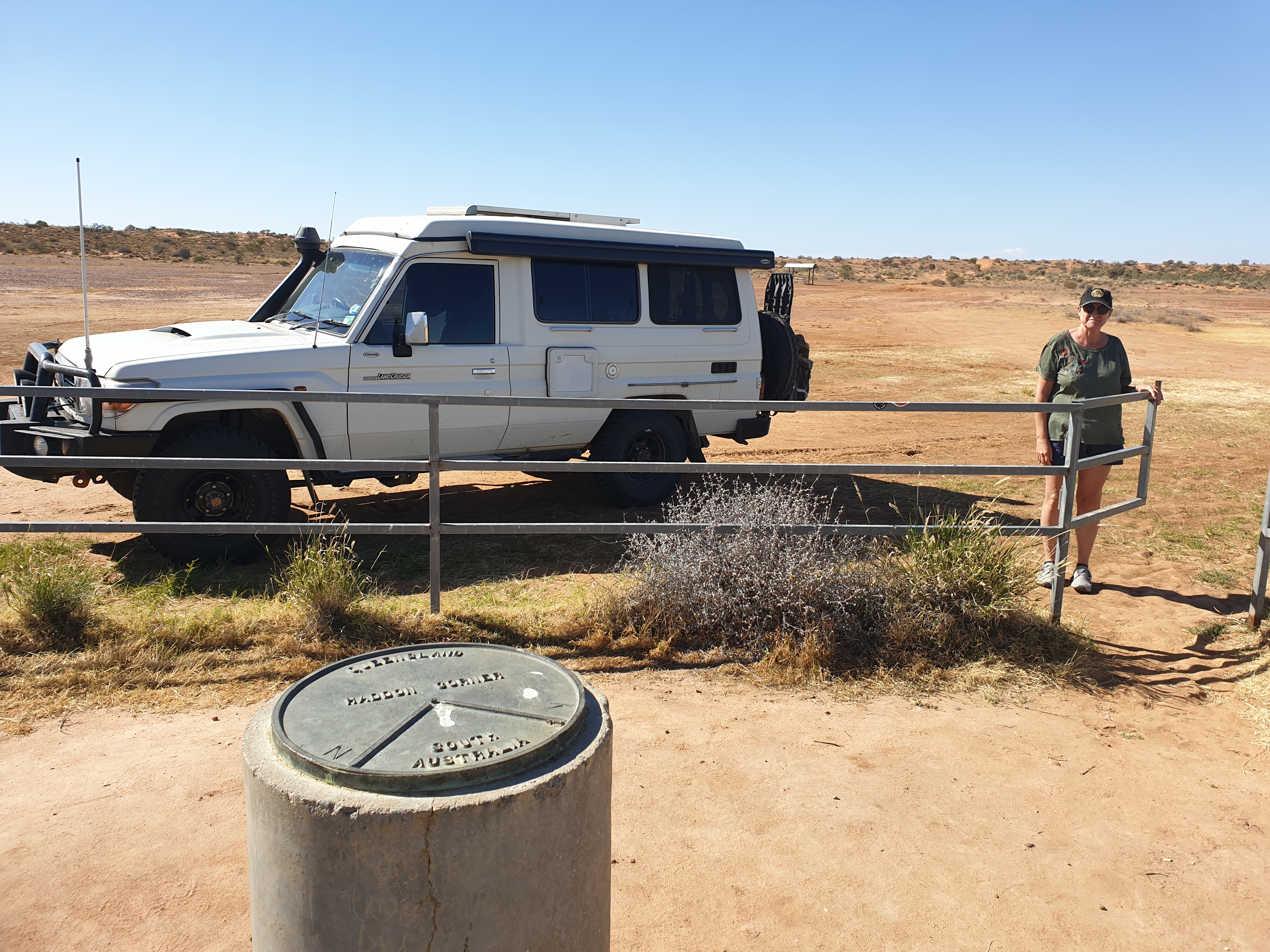
Heritage-listed survey marker at Haddon Corner, 2019

Heritage-listed sites in Tanbar include:

- Haddon Corner, where a survey marker indicates the corner

== Economy ==
There are a number of homesteads in the locality, including:

- Arrabury (26.7609°S 141.0278°E)
- Curalle Tin Shed (26.0404°S 141.3293°E)
- Gilpeppee Outstation (26.1553°S 141.6340°E)
- Nulla Outstation (26.3204°S 141.1777°E)
- Planet Downs Outstation, outstation of Arrabury (25.8719°S 141.1135°E)
- Tanbar Station (25.8419°S 141.9182°E)

== Education ==
There are no schools in Tanbar and none nearby. Distance education and boarding schools are the options.

== Transport ==
There are a number of airstrips in the locality, including:

- Arrabury airstrip, serving the homestead (26.7589°S 141.0272°E)
- Arrabury airstrip (26.6962°S 141.0469°E)
- Planet Downs Outstation airstrip, serving the outstation (25.8748°S 141.1155°E)
- Tanbar airstrip, serving the homestead (25.8515°S 141.9298°E)
