= Diamantina National Park =

National park in Queensland, Australia

- IUCN category II (national park)
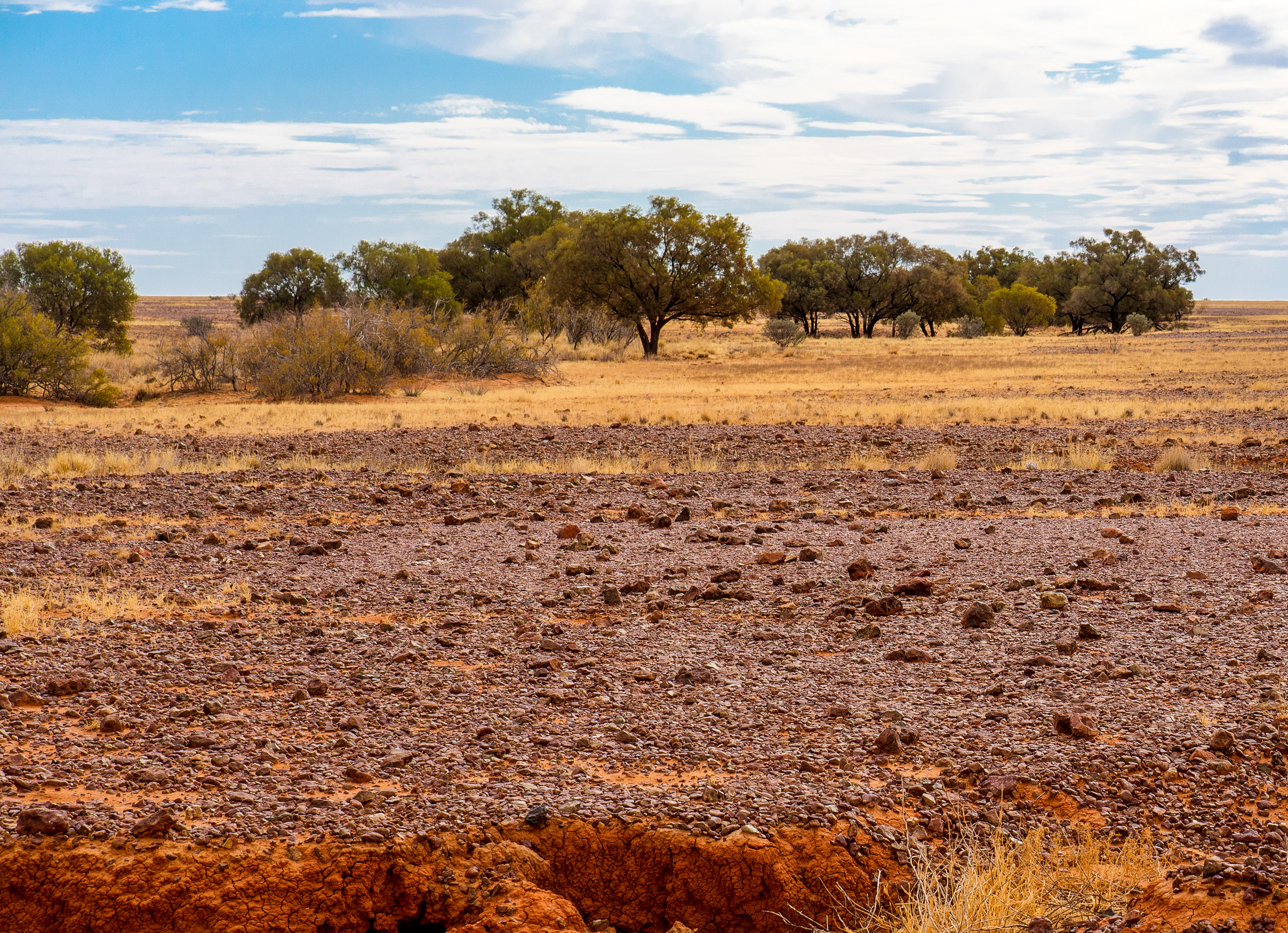
- Diamantina National Park, July 2015

- Location within Queensland
- Location: Queensland
- Nearest city: Bedourie
- Coordinates: 23°21′26″S 141°08′10″E
- Area: 5,070 km^{2} (1,960 sq mi)
- Established: 1993
- Governing body: Queensland Parks and Wildlife Service
- Website: Official website

Map of Diamantina National Park

Diamantina National Park is a national park in the Channel Country of South West Queensland, Australia, 1,278 km (794 mi) west of Brisbane. It is within the locality of Diamantina Lakes in the Shire of Diamantina. Like the Diamantina River that flows through it, it is named for Lady Diamantina Bowen, wife of Sir George Bowen, the first Governor of Queensland.

Established in 1993 after the Queensland Government purchased Diamantina Lakes Station in 1992 and gazetted the property as a national park with an area of 507,000 ha (1,250,000 acres), Diamantina National Park received an award in March 2007 from the World Wildlife Fund (WWF) for being among the top 10 reserves of the decade. Recognition was given for the successful efforts to protect the bilby, an endangered mammal native to Australia.

Livestock was removed from the park in 1998.

Parts of the park contain traditional aboriginal lands. These are noted for their food resources and numerous habitation sites. Aboriginals would roam the area, moving from the sandhills and gibber country in the wet season and returning to permanent water in the dry season.

Average elevations of the terrain is 139 metres.

== Birds ==
With Astrebla Downs National Park, Diamantina National Park forms part of the 7,627 km^{2} (2,945 sq mi) Diamantina and Astrebla Grasslands Important Bird Area, identified by BirdLife International as such because it is one of few sites known for the critically endangered night parrot. It also supports globally important populations of the plains-wanderer, Australian bustard, straw-necked ibis, white-necked heron, inland dotterel, Bourke's parrot, black and pied honeyeaters, gibberbird, Hall's babbler, chestnut-breasted quail-thrush, cinnamon quail-thrush and spinifexbird.

In 2016, a population of the critically endangered night parrot was discovered in the park. The parrot is Australia's rarest bird species. This discovery significantly expanded the known range and is the largest known population of the species.

== See also ==
- Protected areas of Queensland
