= Diamantina Developmental Road =

Road in Queensland

Diamantina Developmental Road Queensland
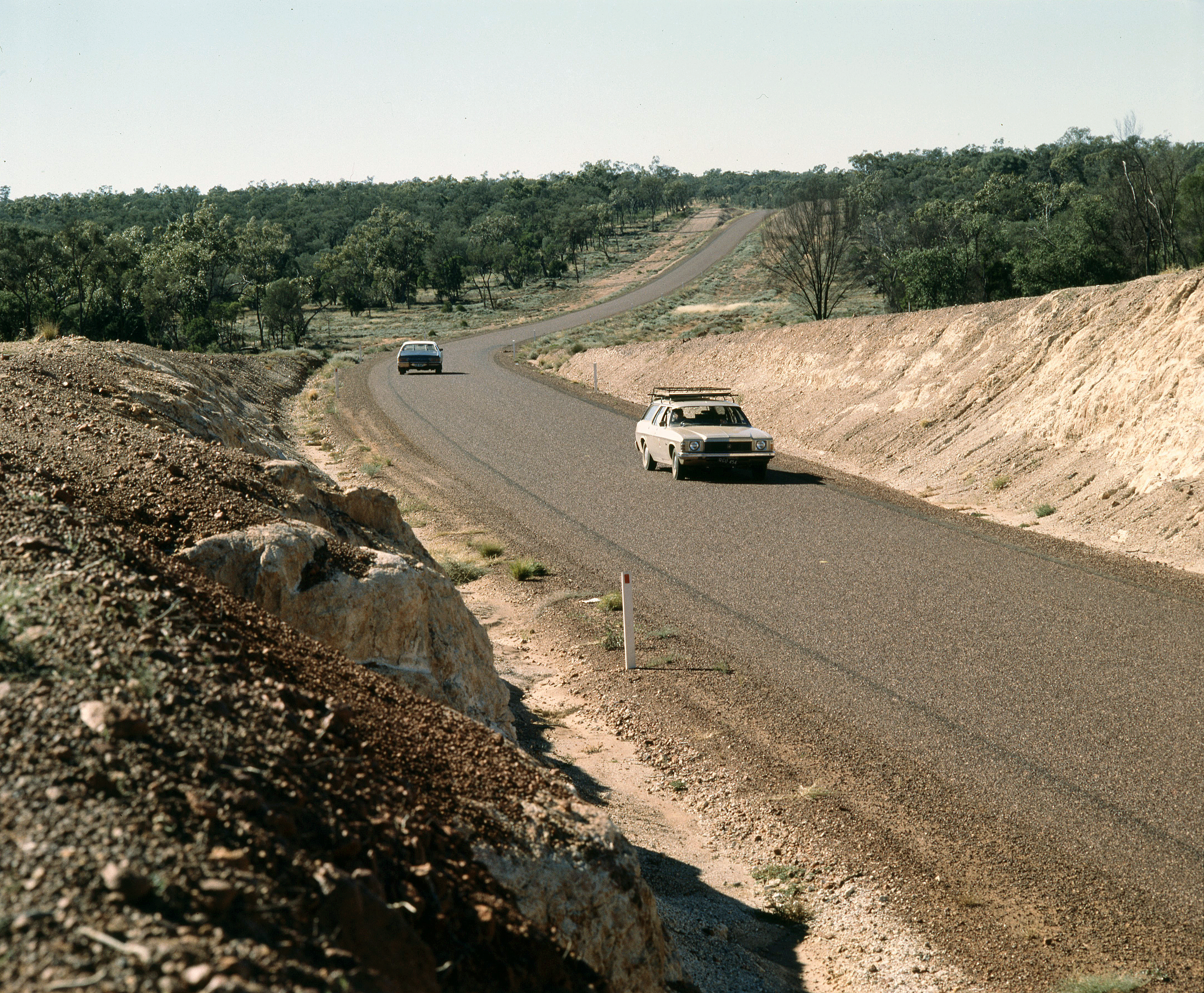
- Diamantina Developmental Road, Charleville to Quilpie, 1979

General information
- Type: Rural road
- Length: 1,344 km (835 mi)
- Route number(s): State Route 14 (Charleville – Windorah); State Route 12 (Windorah – Bedourie); National Route 83 (Bedourie – Mount Isa)

Major junctions
- South-east end: Mitchell Highway (State Highway A71), Charleville, Queensland
- Quilpie Adavale Road; Quilpie Thargomindah Road; Cooper Developmental Road; Thomson Developmental Road (former National Route 79); Birdsville Developmental Road (State Route 14); Eyre Developmental Road (National Route 83); Winton Road (State Route 62); Donohue Highway
- North-west end: Barkly Highway (National Route 83 / State Route A2), Mount Isa, Queensland

Location(s)
- Major settlements: Quilpie, Windorah, Bedourie, Boulia, Dajarra

The Diamantina Developmental Road is a gazetted road in Queensland, Australia, which runs from Charleville in the south-central part of the state to Mount Isa in the north-west.

== Route description ==
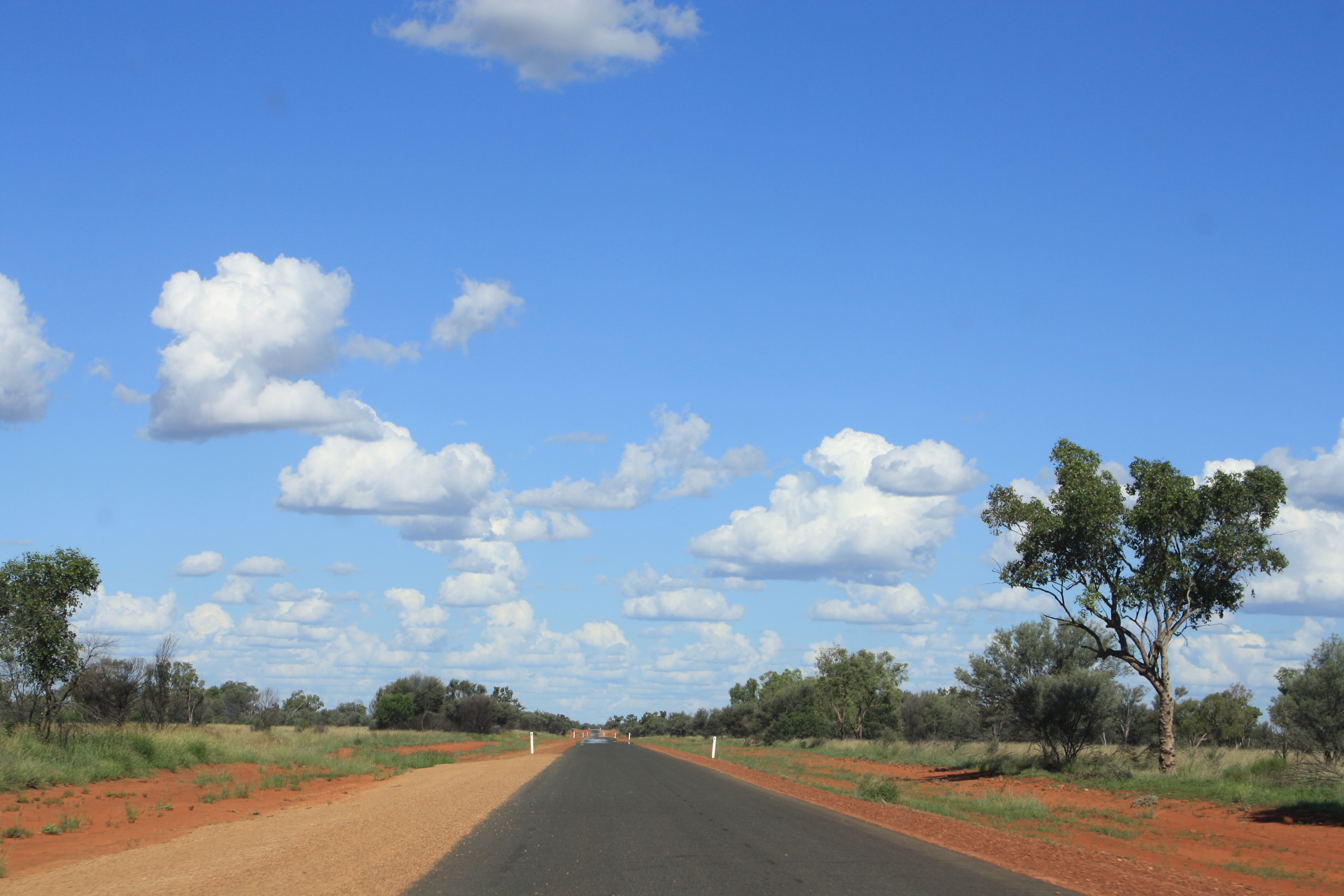
Near Quilpie, 2012

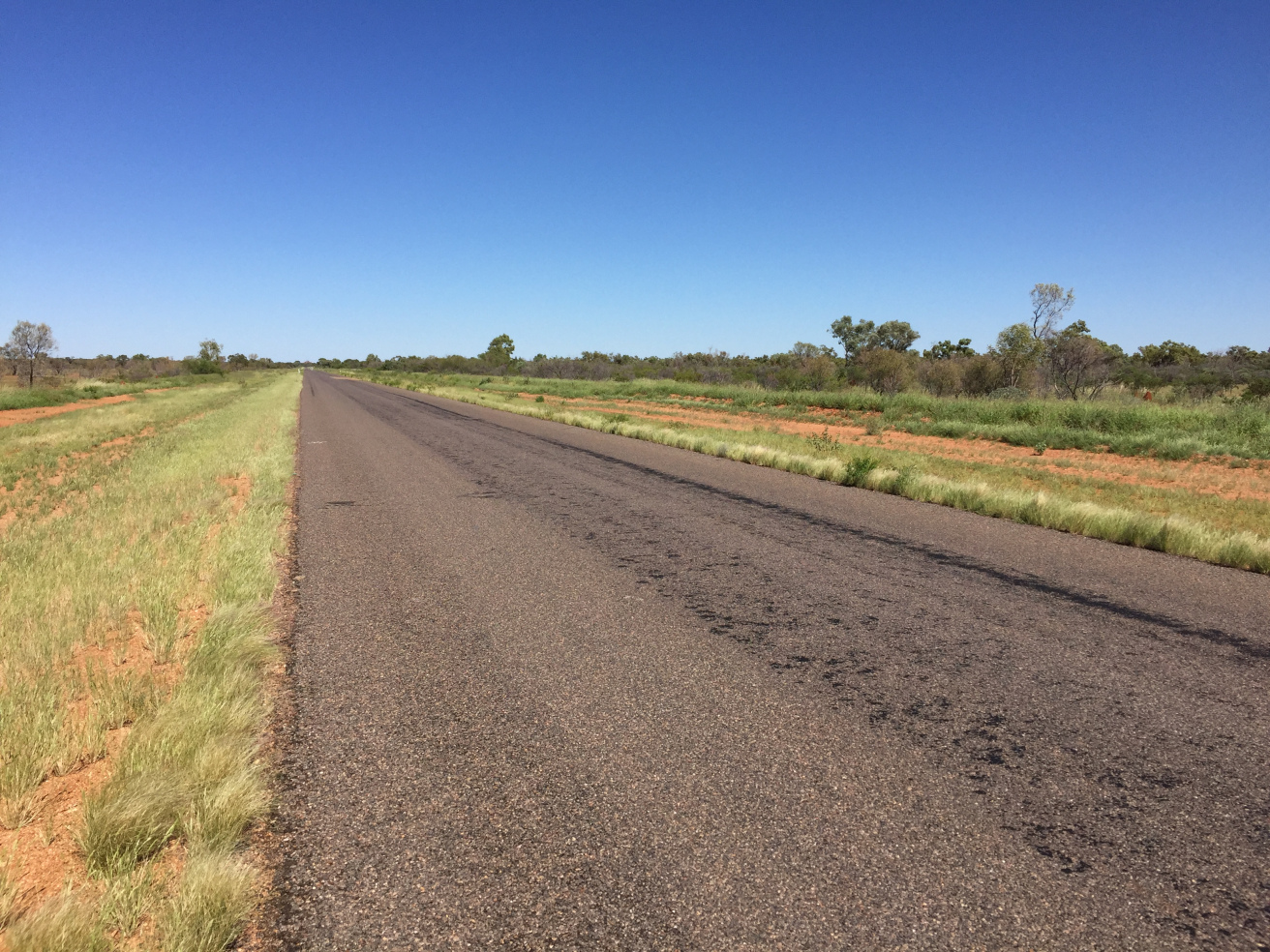
Near Mount Isa, 2016

The road passes through the towns of Quilpie, Windorah, Bedourie, Boulia, and Dajarra in its 1344 kilometer length, and most of it is sealed. Some sections between Windorah and Boulia are unsealed. The section from Boulia to Mount Isa is also known as the Boulia Mount Isa Highway and the section from Bedourie to Boulia is also known as the Boulia Bedourie Road. The section from the Eromanga boundary to the Windorah CBD is also known as the Quilpie Windorah Road.

The road crosses several well known rivers and creeks of the Channel Country of south-west Queensland, including the Paroo River, Bulloo River, Cooper Creek and Diamantina River.

== Responsible authority ==
Maintenance of the road is the responsibility of the Queensland Government.

== Northern Australia Beef Roads upgrade ==
The Northern Australia Beef Roads Program announced in 2016 included the following project for the Diamantina Developmental Road.

=== Rehabilitation and widening ===
The project to rehabilitate and widen the road from Boulia to Dajarra was completed in mid 2019 at a total cost of $5 million.

== Other upgrades ==
=== Widen narrow seal ===
A project to widen the narrow seal on almost 3 kilometres (2 mi) of road immediately south of Boulia, at a cost of $2.145 million, was completed in June 2021.

=== Reconstruct and widen ===
A project to reconstruct and widen 2 kilometres (1.2 mi) of road immediately north of Boulia, at a cost of $1.025 million, was completed in April 2021.

=== Widen and seal ===
A project to widen and seal two sections of road west of Charleville, at a cost of $6.65 million, was completed in March 2022.

=== Floodway upgrade ===
A project to upgrade the Top Limestone Creek floodway, at a cost of $1.5 million, was completed in September 2020.

== Major intersections ==
| LGA | Location | km | mi | Destinations | Notes |
|---|---|---|---|---|---|
| Murweh | Charleville | 0 | 0.0 | Mitchell Highway (State Highway A71) – north – Augathella / south – Cunnamulla | South-eastern end of Diamantina Developmental Road (State Route 14) |
| Quilpie | Quilpie | 197 | 122 | Quilpie Adavale Road – north – Adavale | |
| Quilpie | Quilpie | 212 | 132 | Quilpie Thargomindah Road – south – Thargomindah | |
| Quilpie | Quilpie | 247 | 153 | Cooper Developmental Road – west – Eromanga | |
| Quilpie / Barcoo boundary | Eromanga / Windorah boundary | 385 | 239 | | Name changes to Quilpie Windorah Road |
| Barcoo | Windorah | 450 | 280 | Thomson Developmental Road (See Notes column) – north – Longreach | Thomson Developmental Road is part of a former proposed National Route 79 from Melbourne to Longreach. This route is now signed as M79/A79 from Melbourne to Mildura, then B79 to Broken Hill, beyond which there is no signed number. |
| Barcoo | Windorah | 456 | 283 | | Name reverts to Diamantina Developmental Road as it passes through Windorah CBD |
| Barcoo | Windorah | 566 | 352 | Birdsville Developmental Road (State Route 14) – south–west – Birdsville | Road changes to State Route 12 |
| Diamantina | Bedourie | 824 | 512 | Eyre Developmental Road (National Route 83) – south – Birdsville | Road changes to National Route 83 |
| Diamantina | Bedourie | 847 | 526 | | Name changes to Boulia Bedourie Road as it passes through Bedourie CBD |
| Boulia | Boulia | 1,038 | 645 | Winton Road (State Route 62) – east – Winton | Name changes to Boulia Mount Isa Highway |
| Boulia | Boulia | 1,048 | 651 | Donohue Highway – west – Queensland / Northern Territory border, where it becomes Plenty Highway (NT State Route 12) | |
| Mount Isa | Mount Isa | 1,344 | 835 | Barkly Highway (State Highway A2) – north, then west – Camooweal / Barkly Highway (National Highway 83) – east – Cloncurry | North–western end of Diamantina Developmental Road |
1.000 mi = 1.609 km; 1.000 km = 0.621 mi: Route transition
