= Bilpa Morea =

- Location within Queensland
- Floor elevation: 200 ft (61 m)

Geography
- Location: Bedourie, Southwestern Queensland
- Coordinates: 25°01′59″S 140°00′00″E
- Interactive map of Bilpa Morea

Bilpa Morea is a claypan in Bedourie in the Shire of Diamantina in the extreme southwest of Queensland, Australia. It has been investigated as a possible location for land speed record attempts due to its flat and hard surface. An archaeological dig in 2009 recovered artefacts buried by explorers Burke and Wills under the clay during their ill-fated 1861 expedition.
