= Astrebla Downs National Park =

National park in Australia

- IUCN category II (national park)
- Astrebla Downs National Park

- Location within Queensland
- Location: Queensland
- Nearest city: Birdsville
- Area: 1,740 km^{2} (670 sq mi)
- Established: 1996
- Governing body: Queensland Parks and Wildlife Service

Astrebla Downs is a national park in Shire of Diamantina, Queensland, Australia.

== Geography ==
Astrebla Downs is located in the Channel Country of outback Queensland, 1298 km west of Brisbane. The landscape is flat and barren with few trees. The average elevation of the terrain is 108 metres.

== Animals ==
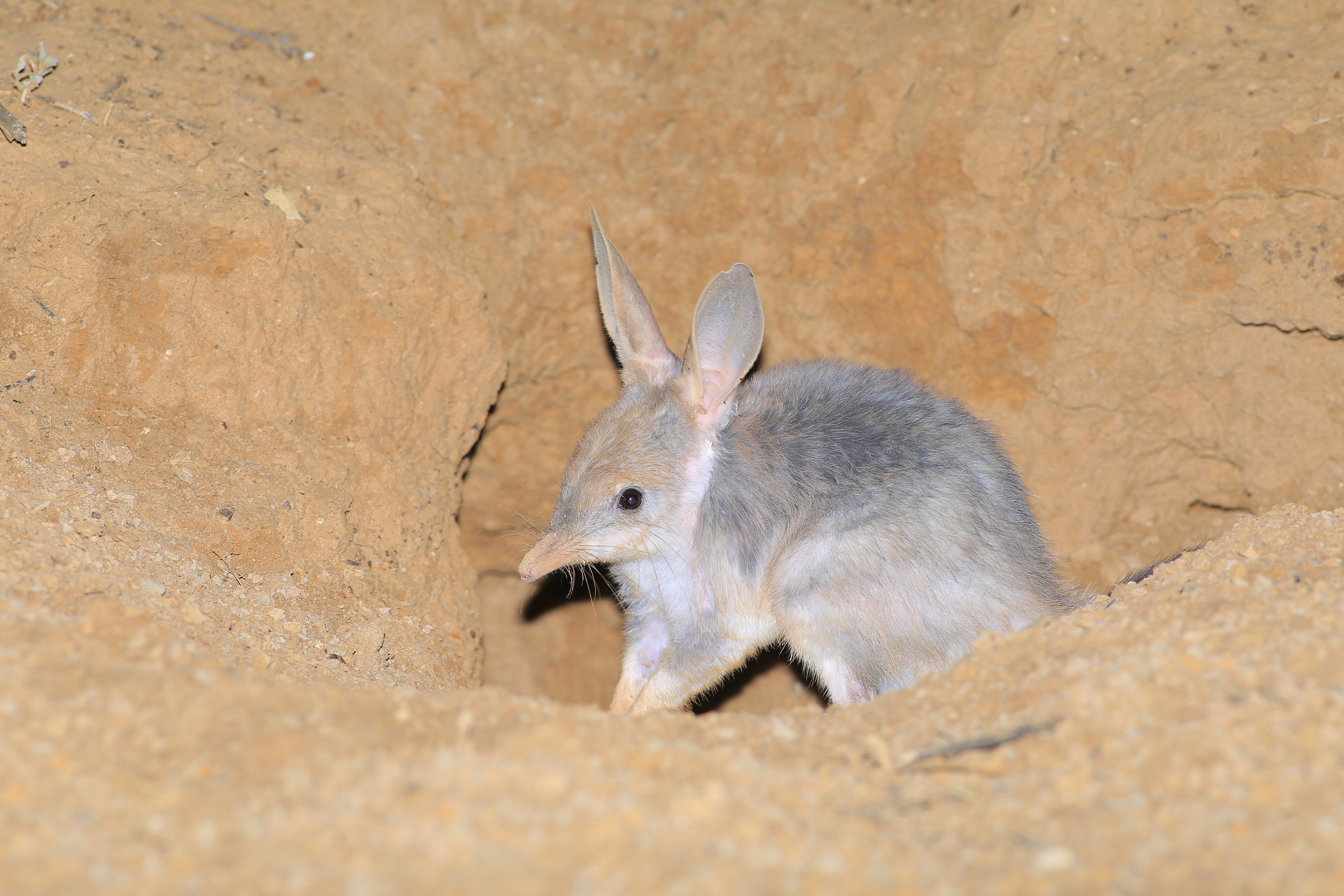
Greater bilby at its burrow, Astrebla Downs National Park, 2024

The park received an award in March 2007 by the WWF for being among the top 10 reserves of the decade. Recognition was given for the successful efforts to protect the bilby, an endangered mammal native to Australia. By 2008 it was estimated the park contained a bilby population of around 300. In 2009, a plague of long-haired rats descended on the park. The large numbers of rats attract feral cats to the area, which pose a threat to the bilby. Between 2011 and 2021, control measures have got rid of more than 3,000 cats, and 471 bilbies were spotted on a survey in June 2021.

The park is home to the kowari, a tiny carnivorous marsupial which is a vulnerable species in Queensland, also threatened by feral cats. The animal had not been photographed anywhere in around ten years before June 2021, when photographs were taken during a survey covering nearly 100 km (62 mi) of tracks, in which a record number – 14 – were spotted in the park. None have been spotted at the nearby Diamantina National Park since 2012.

Astrebla Downs is also home to the stripe-faced dunnart.

== Birds ==
With Diamantina National Park, Astrebla Downs National Park forms part of the 7,627 km^{2} Diamantina and Astrebla Grasslands Important Bird Area, identified by BirdLife International as such because it is one of few sites known for the critically endangered night parrot. It also supports globally important populations of the plains-wanderer, Australian bustard, straw-necked ibis, white-necked heron, inland dotterel, Bourke's parrot, black and pied honeyeaters, gibberbird, Hall's babbler, chestnut-breasted quail-thrush, cinnamon quail-thrush and spinifexbird.

== See also ==
- Davenport Downs Station
- Protected areas of Queensland
