= Cooper Developmental Road =

Road in Queensland, Australia

Cooper Developmental Road Queensland
- Cooper Developmental Road (green on black)

General information
- Type: Rural road
- Length: 186 km (116 mi)

Major junctions
- East end: Diamantina Developmental Road, 37km west of Quilpie, Queensland
- West end: Bulloo Developmental Road, Durham, Queensland

Location(s)
- Major settlements: Eromanga

The Cooper Developmental Road is an outback road in Queensland, Australia. It is sometimes called the Cooper's Creek Developmental Road.

It commences at the Diamantina Developmental Road at 26.61005°S 143.92223°E (approximately 37 kilometres (23 mi) west of Quilpie) and travels south-west for 186 kilometres (116 mi) until it reaches the Bulloo Developmental Road at Durham. 27.3587°S 142.5719°E.

It passes through the town of Eromanga.

== Major intersections ==
This road has no major intersections.
