= Stonehenge, Queensland (Barcoo Shire) =

Town in Australia

Stonehenge
- Town
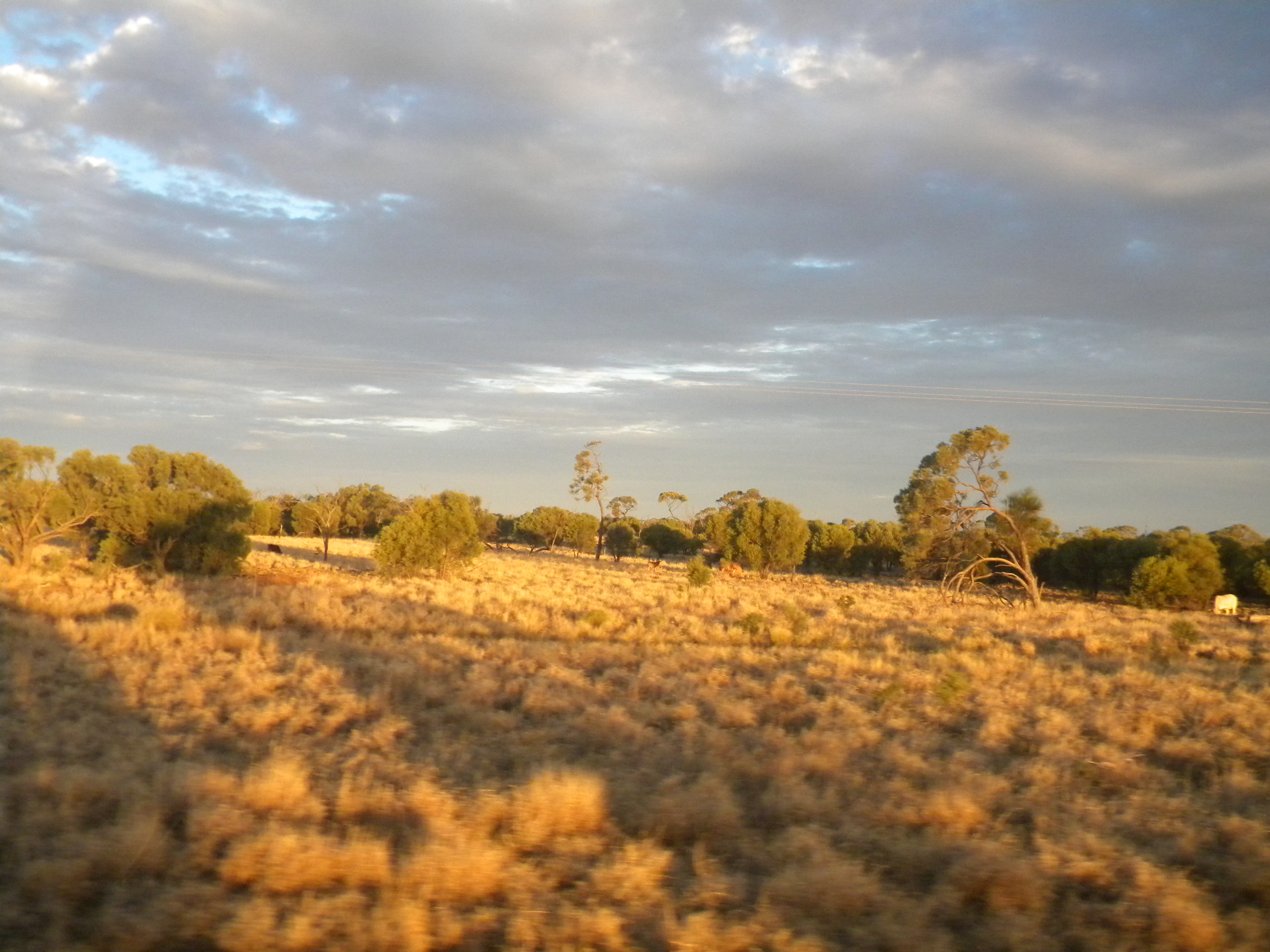
- Late afternoon, Stonehenge

- Interactive map of Stonehenge
- Coordinates: 24.3525°S 143.2875°E
- Country: Australia
- State: Queensland
- LGA: Shire of Barcoo
- Location: 66.9 km (41.6 mi) NNE of Jundah; 155 km (96 mi) SW of Longreach; 841 km (523 mi) W of Rockhampton; 1,221 km (759 mi) NW of Brisbane

Government
  - State electorate: Gregory
  - Federal division: Maranoa

Area
  - Total: 15,432.8 km^{2} (5,958.6 sq mi)

Population
  - Total: 58 (2021 census)
  - Density: 0.00376/km^{2} (0.00973/sq mi)
- Time zone: UTC+10:00 (AEST)
- Postcode: 4730
Localities around Stonehenge
Opalton	Opalton	Longreach
Diamantina Lakes	Stonehenge	Longreach
Farrars Creek	Jundah	Isisford

Stonehenge is an outback town and locality in the Shire of Barcoo, Queensland, Australia. In the 2021 census, the locality of Stonehenge had a population of 58 people.

== Geography ==
Stonehenge is in the Channel Country.

The Jindalee Operational Radar Network (an over-the-horizon radar system) has a receiver at Stonehenge with 90-degree coverage. It is 11 kilometres (6.8 mi) north-west of the town (24.2911°S 143.195286°E).

== History ==
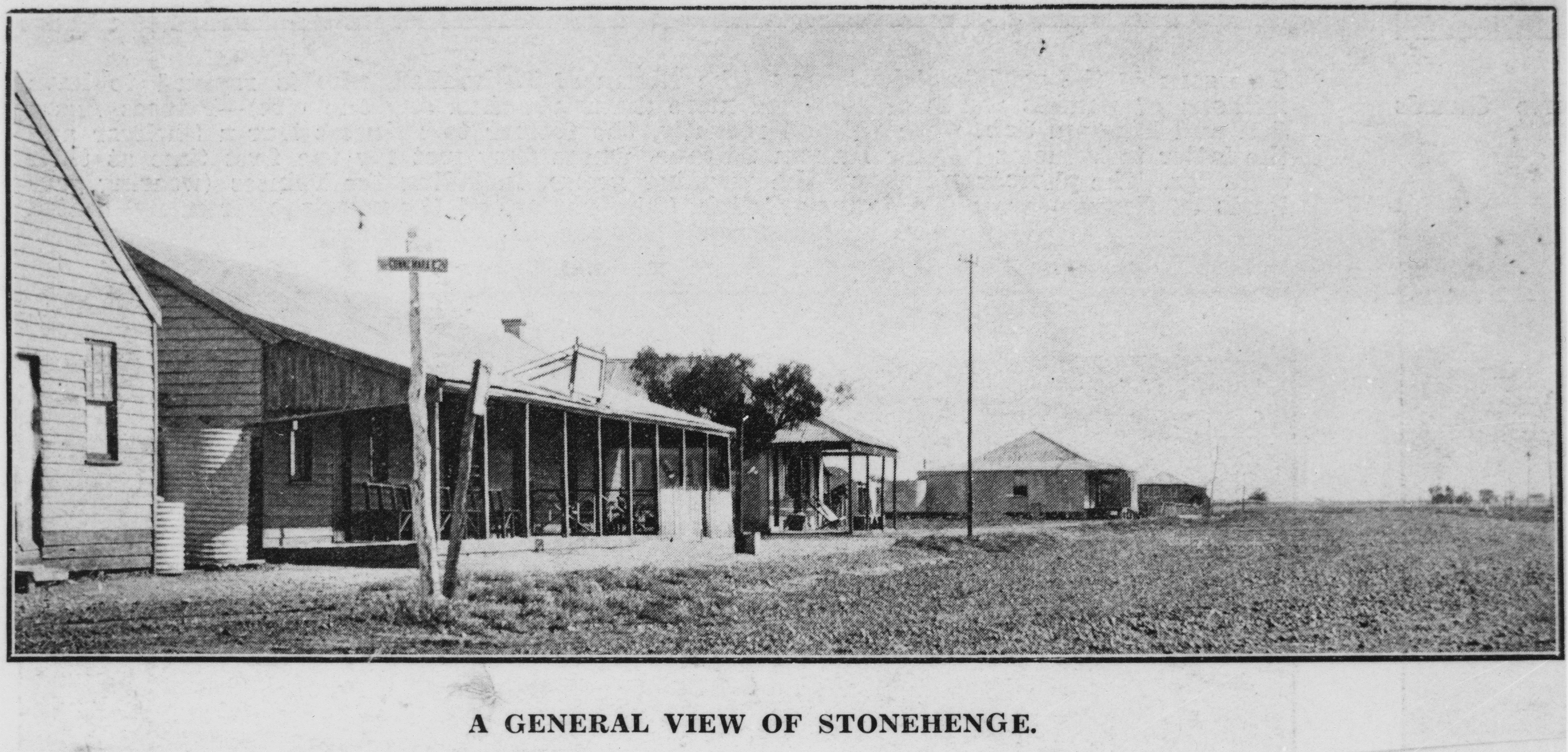
Stonehenge, 1931

The town's name originates from when the area was a stopping point for bullock teams. A stone hut used by the bullock drivers to overnight in eventually fell into disuse, and the stone remains became known as "Stonehenge".

Stonehenge Provisional School opened on 3 September 1900 with an initial enrolment of 24 students under headmaster William James Doherty. It become Stonehenge State School on 1 January 1909. It closed for some periods of time due to war and low student numbers. The present school building was constructed in 1976 with the original school building relocated to the Stonehenge Community Centre, alongside the former police station.

The Stonehenge Library opened in 2009.

== Demographics ==
In the 2006 census, Stonehenge and the surrounding area had a population of 106 people.

In the 2016 census, the locality of Stonehenge had a population of 44 people.

In the 2021 census, the locality of Stonehenge had a population of 58 people.

== Facilities ==
Stonehenge has a sports centre and community centre.

The Barcoo Shire Council operates a public library at 9 Stratford Street.

== Education ==
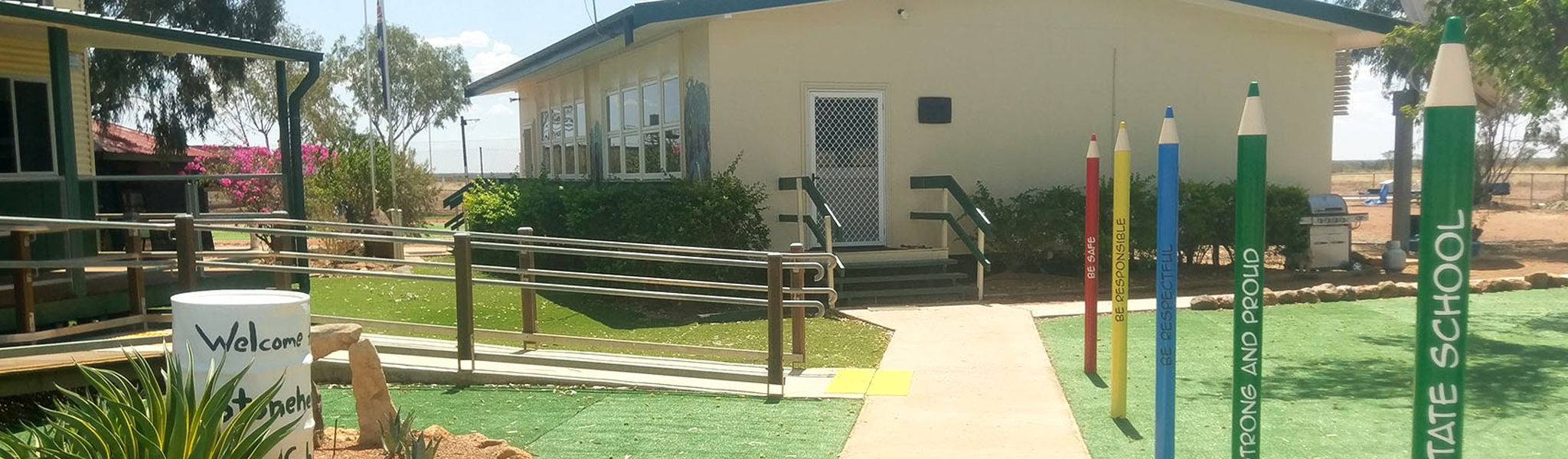
Stonehenge State School, 2025

Stonehenge State School is a government primary (Early Childhood to Year 6) school at 27 Bulford Street (24.3507°S 143.2874°E). In 2017, the school had an enrolment of seven students with two teachers and four non-teaching staff (one full-time equivalent). In 2018, the school had an enrolment of four students with two teachers (one full-time equivalent) and six non-teaching staff (one full-time equivalent). The school motto is "Strong and Proud".

There are no secondary schools in Stonehenge, nor nearby. The nearest government secondary school is in Longreach 155 kilometres (96 mi) away; alternatives are boarding schools and distance education.
