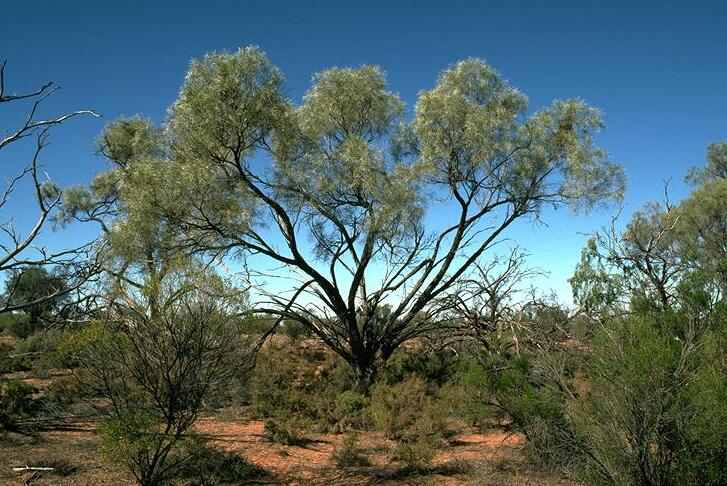

Conservation status
- Vulnerable (EPBC Act)

Scientific classification
- Kingdom: Plantae
- Clade: Tracheophytes
- Clade: Angiosperms
- Clade: Eudicots
- Clade: Rosids
- Order: Fabales
- Family: Fabaceae
- Subfamily: Caesalpinioideae
- Clade: Mimosoid clade
- Genus: Acacia
- Species: A. ammophila

Binomial name
- Acacia ammophila Pedley
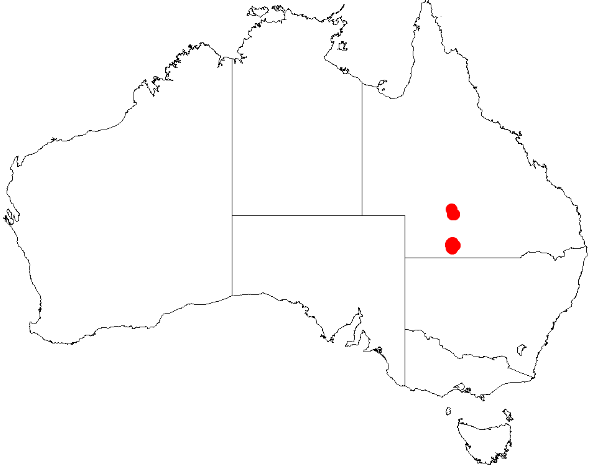
- Occurrence data from AVH

Synonyms
- Racosperma ammophilum (Pedley) Pedley

= Acacia ammophila =

Species of legume

Acacia ammophila is a species of flowering plant in the family Fabaceae and is endemic to southern inland Queensland. It has linear phyllodes, flowers arranged in racemes or 2 to 4 spherical heads of 25 to 40 golden yellow flowers, and a pod up to 200 mm (7.9 in) long.

== Description ==
Acacia ammophila is a tree that typically grows to a height of up to 6 m (20 ft) and has dark grey, furrowed bark. The phyllodes are linear100–200 mm (3.9–7.9 in) long, 2.5–6 mm (0.098–0.236 in) wide, and densely covered with silvery hairs pressed against the surface. The flowers are arranged in racemes 1–4 mm (0.039–0.157 in) long on a hairy peduncle 7–12 mm (0.28–0.47 in) long, with 2 to 4 spherical heads each containing 25 to 40 golden-yellow flowers. Flowering has been recorded in March and from May to September, and the fruit is a straight, leathery to more or less cartilage-like pod 200 mm (7.9 in) long and 4–8 mm (0.16–0.31 in) wide. The seeds are oblong, dark brown, about 10 mm (0.39 in) long with a minute aril.

== Taxonomy ==
Acacia ammophila was first formally described in 1978 by Leslie Pedley in the journal Austrobaileya from specimens collected near the Dynevor Lakes, 32 km (20 mi) east of Thargomindah. The specific epithet (ammophila) means 'sand lover'.

== Distribution ==
This species of Acacia has only been found in southern inland Queensland, from near Adavale and near Thargomindah on the slopes of red sand dunes and on alluvial soils in open shrubland.

== Conservation status ==
Acacia ammophila is listed as "vulnerable" under the Australian Government Environment Protection and Biodiversity Conservation Act 1999. The main threats to the species include grazing by feral animals, land clearing and road maintenance activities.

== See also ==
- List of Acacia species
