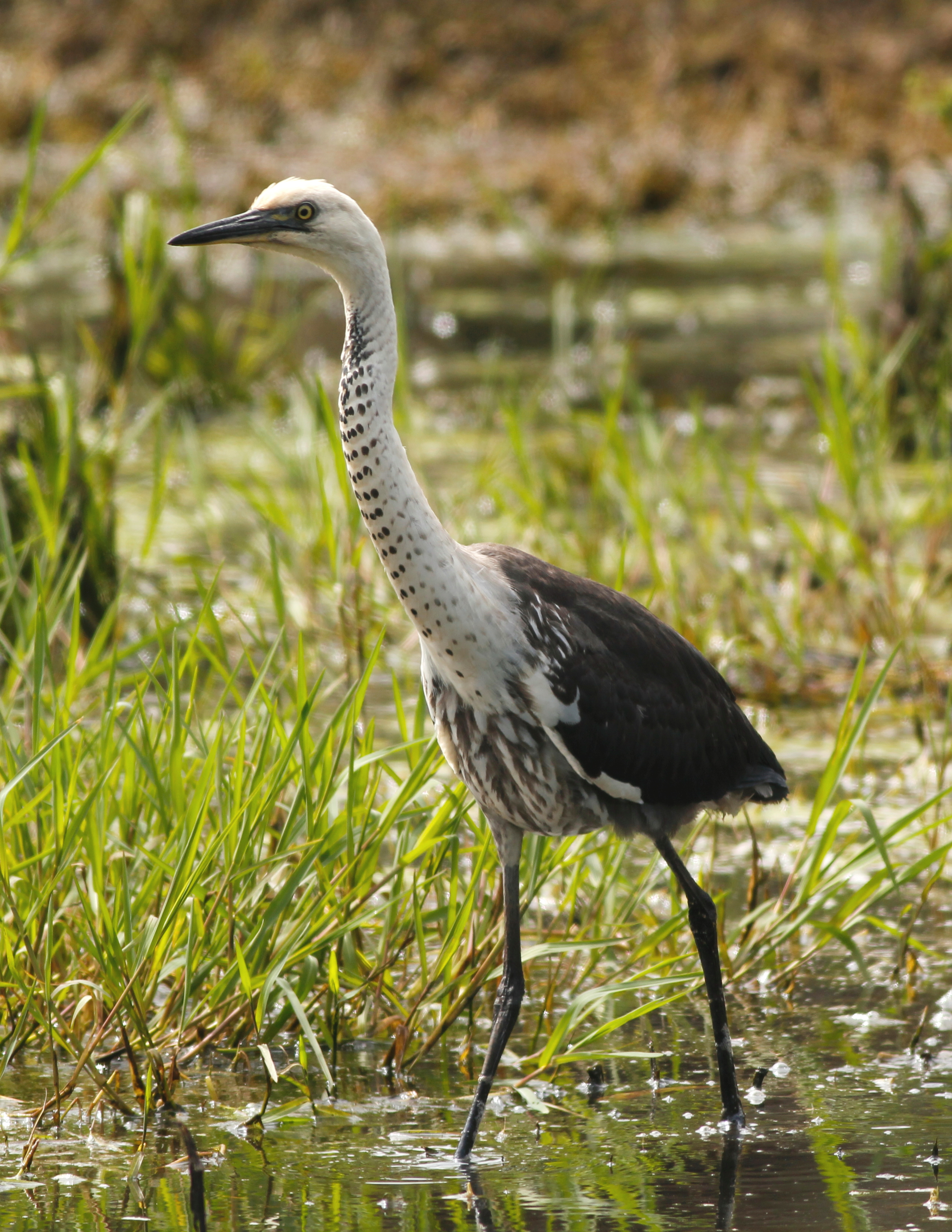
- In Edithvale Wetland, Melbourne, Australia

Conservation status
- Least Concern (IUCN 3.1)

Scientific classification
- Kingdom: Animalia
- Phylum: Chordata
- Class: Aves
- Order: Pelecaniformes
- Family: Ardeidae
- Genus: Ardea
- Species: A. pacifica

Binomial name
- Ardea pacifica Latham, 1801
- Range map

= White-necked heron =

Species of bird

The white-necked heron or Pacific heron (Ardea pacifica) is a species of heron that is found on most of the Australian continent wherever freshwater habitats exist. It is also found in parts of Indonesia and New Guinea, but is uncommon in Tasmania. The populations of this species in Australia are known to be nomadic like most water birds in Australia, moving from one water source to another, often entering habitats they have not previously occupied, taking advantage of flooding and heavy rain where the surplus of food allows them to breed and raise their young. Irruptive movements may occur when environmental conditions are right in places where the species has been rare or absent.

== Taxonomy ==
The white-necked heron was formally described in 1801 by the English ornithologist John Latham under the current binomial name Ardea pacifica. Latham specified the locality as New South Wales. The species is monotypic: no subspecies are recognised.

== Description ==
The white-necked heron is a large, diurnal, long-legged waterbird. It is mostly slate-grey to black with distinctive black spots in the centre of the lower fore-neck and throat. During the breeding season plum-coloured nuptial plumes are present on the back and breast. The flight is stately, with slow steady wing-beats. The length is 76–106 cm (30–42 in), wingspan 147–160 cm (58–63 in) and weight 860 g (30 oz).

The bill is black and the facial skin is commonly blue or yellow. The eyes are green and the legs and feet black. It has an elongated neck and beak designed to reach out and catch fish, frogs, spiders and other food animals available in its habitat. Most of the head and neck is white, with the black spots on the neck only visible in non-breeding individuals.

In the downy young, the down is longer, especially on the crown, with the neck and head white and upperparts and upper wing light grey-brown. Juvenile feathers are dark grey. In juveniles a broad strip of grey-black runs down the front of the neck. The head and neck are commonly tinged brownish-grey. The adult feathers emerge as the juvenile feathers become worn.

== Distribution and habitat ==
The white-necked heron is found throughout most of the Australian continent, commonly residing in wetlands, tidal areas, shallow fresh waters, farm dams, claypans, pastures and runoff water in roadside ditches. The species has thrived following the construction of irrigation, dams and other man-made water sources.

The species is not found in some parts of Western Australia and South Australia, nor in the arid Great Sandy, Gibson, and Great Victoria Deserts or the Nullarbor Plain. Movements are still largely unknown due to irruptive habits, which are commonly attributed to genetic adaptions to erratic environmental conditions.

== Behaviour ==
The white-necked heron is a shy bird, keeping to areas where it has a clear view of its surrounds. Commonly found in shallow wetlands, it is usually seen foraging singly or in pairs. It will defend feeding territories against other species and has been seen harassing ibises (Threskiornis moluccus) and raptors, often stealing prey they have caught. When water sources dry up they fly to others at an altitude of 30-100m. Their habitat includes terrestrial wetlands, grasslands and flooded pastures as well as farm dams.

=== Breeding ===
The nest is made from bulky materials (twigs and sticks about 1 cm-2 cm in diameter) very loosely constructed on a platform with a depression in the middle and usually measures 30 cm-60 cm across. Nests are commonly at a height of between 15m-30m above the ground on a tree structure associated with access to a close a food and water source. During breeding seasons males have been observed standing on or near the nest structure for very long periods, fiddling with nesting material, preening, and displaying himself. The male has also been observed displaying a dance of the following movements: starting at a normal stance, the bird brings its body into a horizontal position, throwing its head back nearly reaching the body. Stretching its head skyward and pumping its head three to four times over the course of a minute. With legs bent, exclaiming an "oomph" call or guttural croak.

Breeding frequency is once a year. The bond between males and females of the species is assumed to be monogamous. The nesting season is from September to December and sometimes January. It has suggested eggs are incubated for 30 days before hatching. Eggs are light blue-green, measuring 53mm x 38mm. Clutch sizes usually consist of four eggs but as many as six have been known to occur. Breeding success rate is between 0.3 and 1.8 young to maturity, eggs incubated by both parents. When the chicks hatch, the parents alternate shifts to provide shade with their wings. Their first flights take place at about 6–7 weeks of age. They start leaving the nest when they are 3/4 grown.

=== Feeding ===
The diet includes freshwater mussels, fish, shrimp, freshwater crayfish, spiders, dragonfly nymphs, damselflies, praying mantis, grasshoppers, water beetles, lizards, young ducklings, young rodents and amphibians. The young are fed with regurgitated tadpoles and may knock smaller young out of the nest in competition for the food source.

== Predators ==
- Introduced red fox – Vulpes vulpes
- Feral cat – Felis catus

== Conservation ==
The species is considered to be secure in all states and territories of Australia.

== Gallery ==
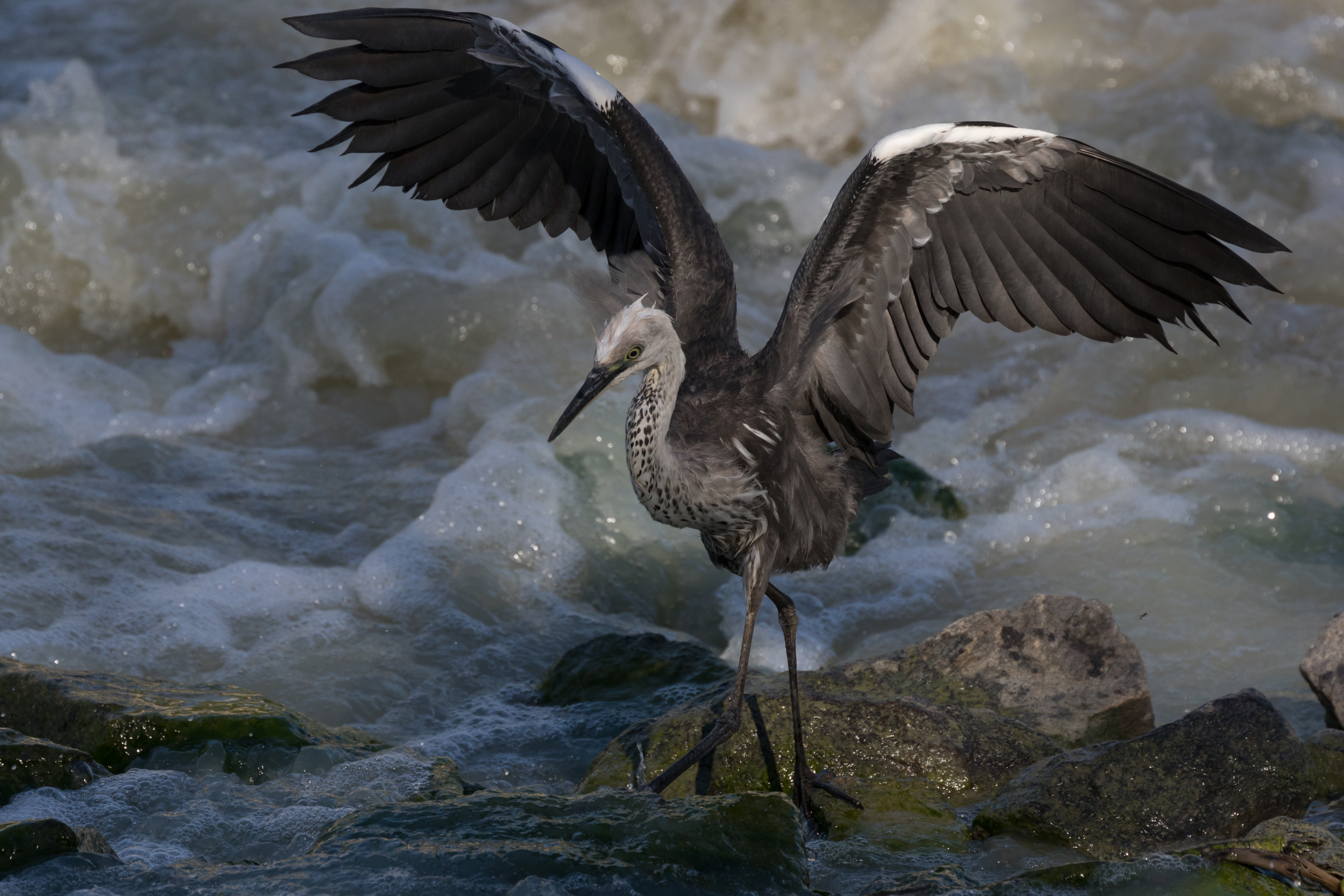

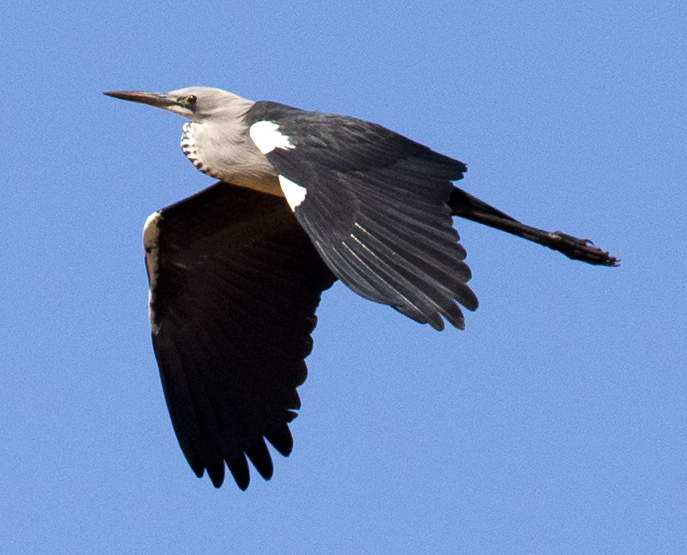

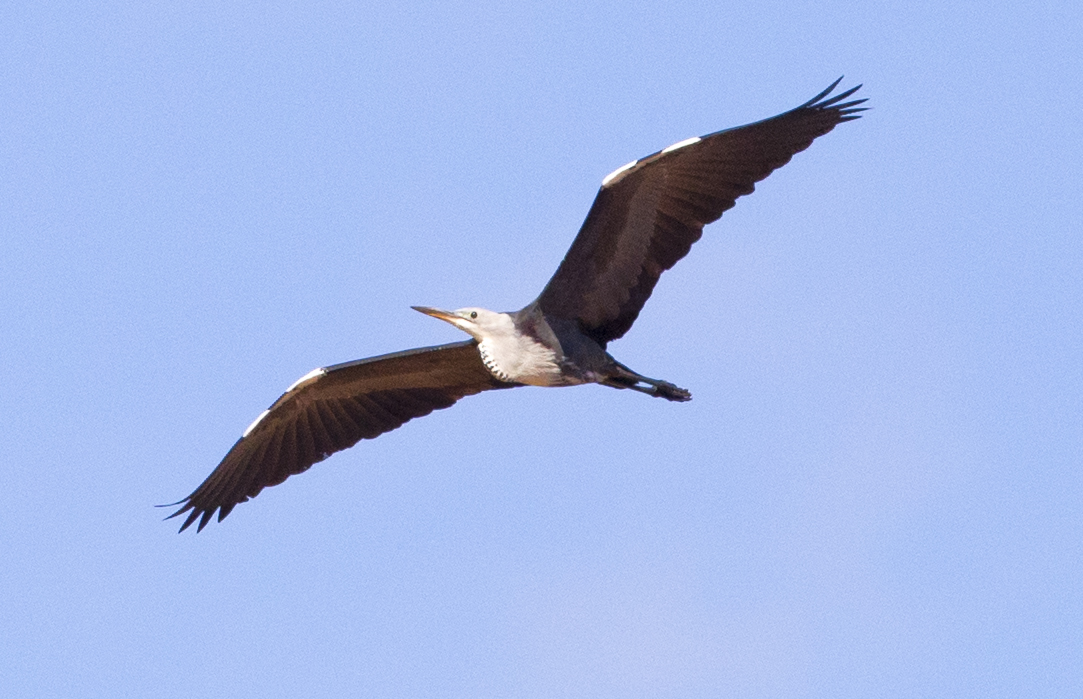

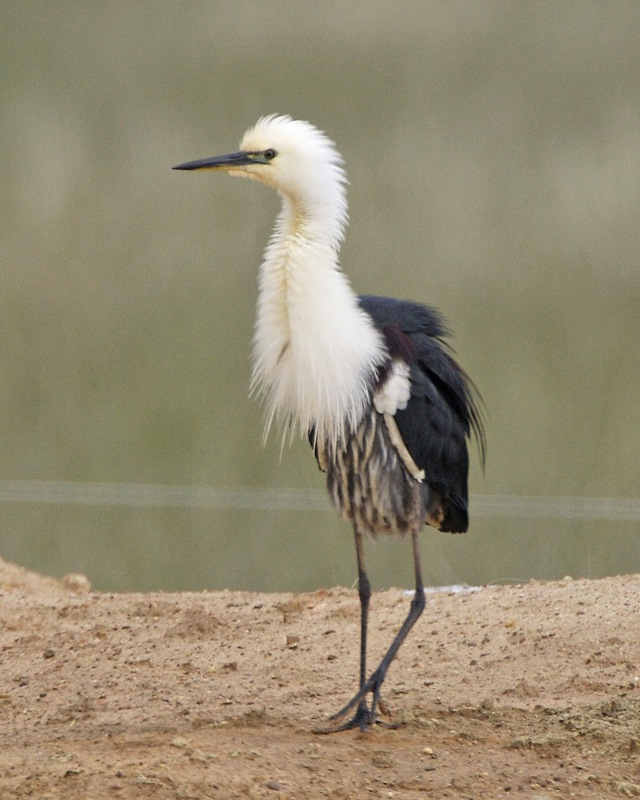
