= Welford National Park =

National park in Australia

- IUCN category II (national park)
- Location within Queensland
- Location: Queensland
- Nearest city: Jundah
- Coordinates: 25°03′31″S 143°26′02″E
- Area: 1,240 km^{2} (480 sq mi)
- Established: 1994
- Governing body: Queensland Parks and Wildlife Service
- Website: Official website

Welford is a national park in Central West Queensland, Australia, 991 km west of Brisbane. It is located 30km to the South-east of Jundah. The park was established in 1994 to protect the biodiversity of the Mulga Lands, Mitchell Grass Downs and Channel Country bioregions. The southern border is marked by the Barcoo River.

The name of the park comes from the original owner of the grazing station, Richard Welford, who established the property around 1870 and called it Walton, but it was changed to Welford Downs after his death.

Richard Welford and his stationhand were killed in 1872 by an Aboriginal man known as Kangaroo or Jiu-Jiu who had deserted from the Native Police. Subsequent punitive expeditions were conducted by Native Police detachments and local pastoralists such as Charles Lumley Hill which resulted in many of the local Aboriginal population being shot at Welford's station, along the Barcoo River and in the Cheviot Range around what is now Hell Hole Gorge National Park.

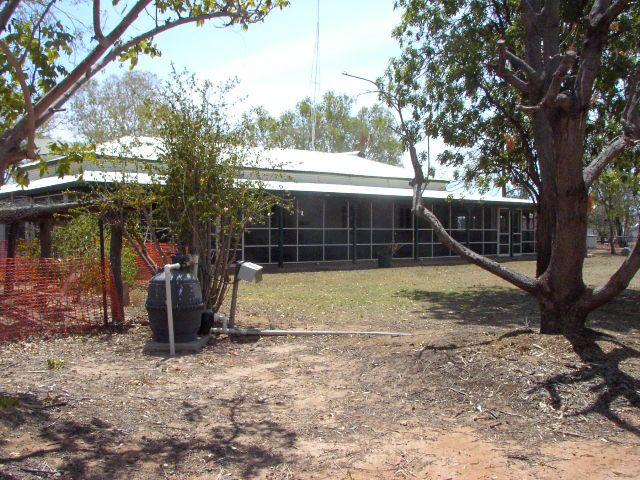
Welford Homestead, 2005

The rare yellow-footed rock-wallaby is found in the park as are aboriginal stone arrangements and water wells. Welford Homestead is heritage-listed homestead built in the early 1880s.

Camping with a permit is allowed at one site along the Barcoo River.

Recreational activities are centred on the permanent waterholes along the Barcoo where visitors can enjoy fishing, canoeing and kayaking. There are also three tourist drives that cover the river, sand dune and mulga escarpment ecosystems found in the park and totalling more than 100 kilometres.

== See also ==
- Protected areas of Queensland
- Lochern National Park
- Idalia National Park
