= Birdsville Developmental Road =

Road in Australia

Birdsville Developmental Road Queensland
- Birdsville Developmental Road (blue and white)

General information
- Type: Rural road
- Length: 273 km (170 mi)
- Route number(s): State Route 14

Major junctions
- East end: State Route 12 (Diamantina Developmental Road)
- West end: Birdsville

The Birdsville Developmental Road (State Route 14) is a mostly unsealed road in south-west Queensland that branches off the Diamantina Developmental Road at a point 103 kilometres (64 mi) west of Windorah and runs to Birdsville. Its length is 273 kilometres (170 mi). The road crosses a major channel of the Diamantina River just before reaching Birdsville. It links with Cordillo Downs road (via Cordillo Downs station) and Arrabury Road (via Haddon Corner), both of which lead to the South Australian town of Innamincka.

== Upgrades ==
=== Pave and seal ===
Two projects to pave and seal sections of the road are:

- 5 kilometres (3.1 mi) of road at a cost of $4.5 million was completed in November 2021.
- 5 kilometres (3.1 mi) of road at a cost of $3.75 million was to be completed by April 2022.

== See also ==
- Highways in Australia
- List of highways in Queensland
