= Shire of Diamantina =

Coordinates: 24°19′32″S 139°27′09″E

- Local government area
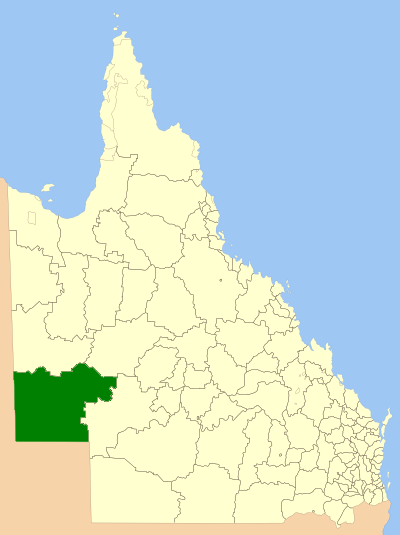
- Location within Queensland

- Interactive map of Shire of Diamantina
- Country: Australia
- State: Queensland
- Region: Central West Queensland
- Established: 1879
- Council seat: Bedourie

Government
  - Mayor: Robert Martin Dare
  - State electorate: Gregory
  - Federal division: Maranoa

Area
  - Total: 94,731 km^{2} (36,576 sq mi)

Population
  - Total: 266 (2021 census)
  - Density: 0.002808/km^{2} (0.007273/sq mi)
- Website: Shire of Diamantina
LGAs around Shire of Diamantina
Central Desert (NT)	Boulia	Winton
MacDonnell (NT)	Shire of Diamantina	Barcoo
Outback Areas (SA)	Outback Areas (SA)	Barcoo

The Shire of Diamantina is a local government area in Central West Queensland, bordering South Australia and the Northern Territory. Its administrative centre is in the town of Bedourie.

Like most places in Queensland with the "Diamantina" name, it was named after Lady Diamantina Bowen (née Roma), the wife of the first governor of Queensland, Sir George Bowen.

It covers an area of 94,731 square kilometres (36,575.8 sq mi), and is the second largest LGA in the state. The shire was established in 1879. The town of Birdsville is home to the Birdsville Races, a horse race meeting to raise money for the Royal Flying Doctor Service.

In the 2021 census, the Shire of Diamantina had a population of 266 people.

== History ==
Wangkangurru (also known as Arabana/Wangkangurru, Wangganguru, Wanggangurru, Wongkangurru) is an Australian Aboriginal language spoken on Wangkangurru country. It is closely related to Arabana language of South Australia. The Wangkangurru language region was traditionally in the South Australian-Queensland border region taking in Birdsville and extending south towards Innamincka and Lake Eyre, including the local government areas of the Shire of Diamantina as well as the Outback Communities Authority of South Australia.

Yawarrawarrka (also known as Yawarawarka, Yawarawarga, Yawarawarka, Jauraworka, Jawarawarka) is an Australian Aboriginal language of Far Western Queensland. The traditional language region includes the local government area of the Shire of Diamantina extending into the Outback Communities Authority of South Australia towards Innamincka.

Karuwali (also known as Garuwali, Dieri) is a language of far western Queensland. The Karuwali language region includes the landscape within the local government boundaries of the Diamantina Shire Council, including the localities of Betoota and Haddon Corner.

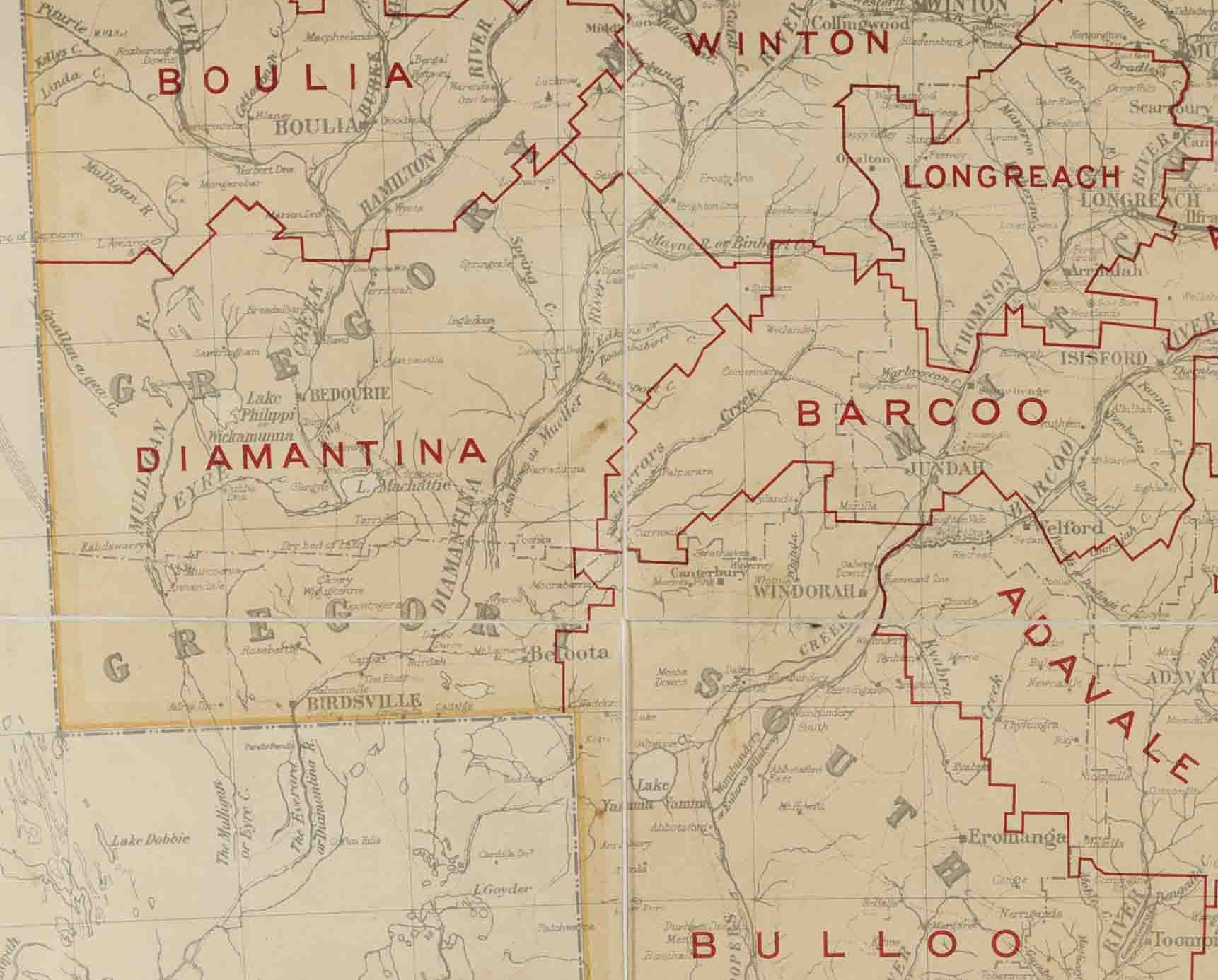
Map of Diamantina Division and adjacent local government areas, March 1902

On 11 November 1879, the Diamantina Division was established as one of 74 divisions around Queensland under the Divisional Boards Act 1879 with a population of 1153.

In October 1880, part of Diamantina Division was separated to create Gregory Division.

On 21 June 1883, the boundaries between Diamantina Division and Bulloo Division were adjusted.

With the passage of the Local Authorities Act 1902, Diamantina Division became the Shire of Diamantina on 31 March 1903.

The seat of the Council moved from Birdsville to Bedourie in 1953.

In the 2021 census, Diamantina Shire had 266 people, down from 292 in 2018.

== Towns and localities ==
The Shire of Diamantina includes the following:

Settlements

- Bedourie
- Betoota (ghost town)
- Birdsville

National parks

- Astrebla National Park
- Diamantina National Park
- Munga-Thirri National Park

Archaeological sites

- Bilpa Morea, associated with the Burke and Wills expedition

== Amenities ==
Diamantina Shire Council operates public libraries in Bedourie and Birdsville.

== Chairmen and mayors ==
Chairmen

- 1889: William Blair (owner of the Birdsville Hotel)
- 1927: Harry Afford

Mayors

- 2008–2012: Robbie Dare (elected unopposed)
- 2012–2020: Geoffrey (Geoff) Moreton
- 2020–present: Robert Martin Dare

== Demographics ==
Year	Population	Notes
1879	1135	
1933	214	
1947	234	
1954	239	
1961	327	
1966	321	
1971	280	
1976	255	
1981	366	
1986	302	
1991	332	
1996	415	
2001 census	434	
2006 census	281	
2011 census	283	
2016 census	291	
2021 census	266	
