= Jundah, Queensland =

Jundah
- Town
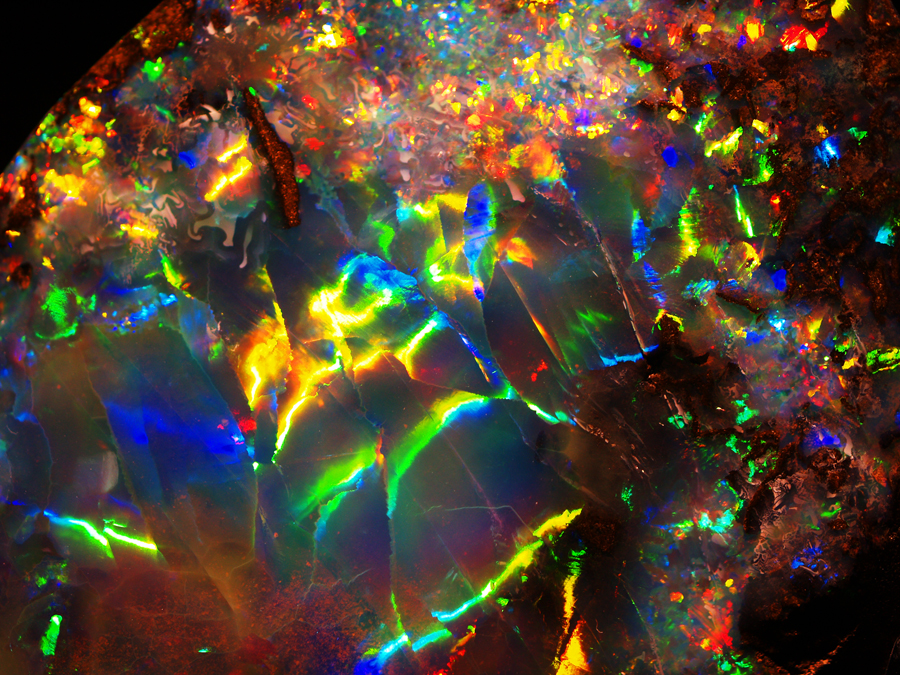
- Fiery Opal from Opalville Mine, Jundah field

- Interactive map of Jundah
- Coordinates: 24.8325°S 143.0597°E
- Country: Australia
- State: Queensland
- LGA: Barcoo Shire
- Location: 219 km (136 mi) SW of Longreach; 297 km (185 mi) NNW of Quilpie; 776 km (482 mi) WNW of Roma; 904 km (562 mi) WSW of Rockhampton; 1,254 km (779 mi) WNW of Brisbane

Government
  - State electorate: Gregory
  - Federal division: Maranoa

Area
  - Total: 13,085.7 km^{2} (5,052.4 sq mi)

Population
  - Total: 131 (2021 census)
  - Density: 0.01001/km^{2} (0.02593/sq mi)
- Time zone: UTC+10:00 (AEST)
- Postcode: 4736
- County: Wolseley
Localities around Jundah
| Stonehenge | Stonehenge | Isisford; Yaraka |
| Farrars Creek | Jundah | Adavale |
| Windorah | Windorah | Eromanga |

Jundah is an outback town and locality in the Shire of Barcoo, Queensland, Australia. Jundah is the administrative centre of the Barcoo Shire local government area. In the 2021 census, the locality of Jundah had a population of 131 people.

== Geography ==
The town is located on the Thomson River in Central West Queensland, 1,122 kilometres (697 mi) west of the state capital, Brisbane.

== History ==
Kuungkari (also known as Kungkari and Koonkerri) is a language of Western Queensland. The Kuungkari language region includes the landscape within the local government boundaries of Longreach Shire Council and Blackall-Tambo Shire Council.

The outback town was established in 1883 and given a name meaning "woman" in a local Aboriginal language.

Jundah was first settled by pastoralists Patrick Durack (on Thylungra) and his brother-in-law John Costello (on Kyabra).

In 1873, Jundah was acquired by grazier William Pitt Tozer, who built a homestead on the land. From 1875 to 1880 the Jundah homestead was utilised by the paramilitary Native Police as their main barracks on the lower Thomson River.

Jundah Post Office opened on 26 June 1877 (a receiving office named Jundah Police Barracks had been open from 1876).

Jundah State School opened on 30 April 1900 with about 50 students. At that time, the town had a population of about 300 people.

Jundah was home to an opal mining industry for around twenty years in the early twentieth century before the industry closed down due to water shortages.

The Jundah Library opened in 2005.

== Demographics ==
In the 2011 census, the locality of Jundah and surrounds had a population of 350 people.

In the 2016 census, the locality of Jundah had a population of 106 people.

In the 2021 census, the locality of Jundah had a population of 131 people.

== Heritage listings ==
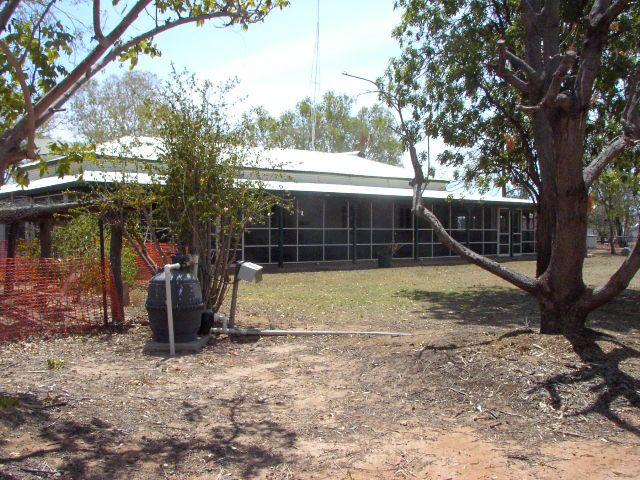
Welford Homestead, 2005

Jundah has a number of heritage-listed sites, including:

- Welford Homestead

== Economy ==
Today, the town now supports the surrounding sheep and cattle industry.

== Facilities ==
As well as the Barcoo Shire administration centre, other facilities in the town include a police station, general store, post office agency and a tourist information centre.

The Barcoo Shire Council operate Jundah Library at 11 Dickson Street.

== Education ==
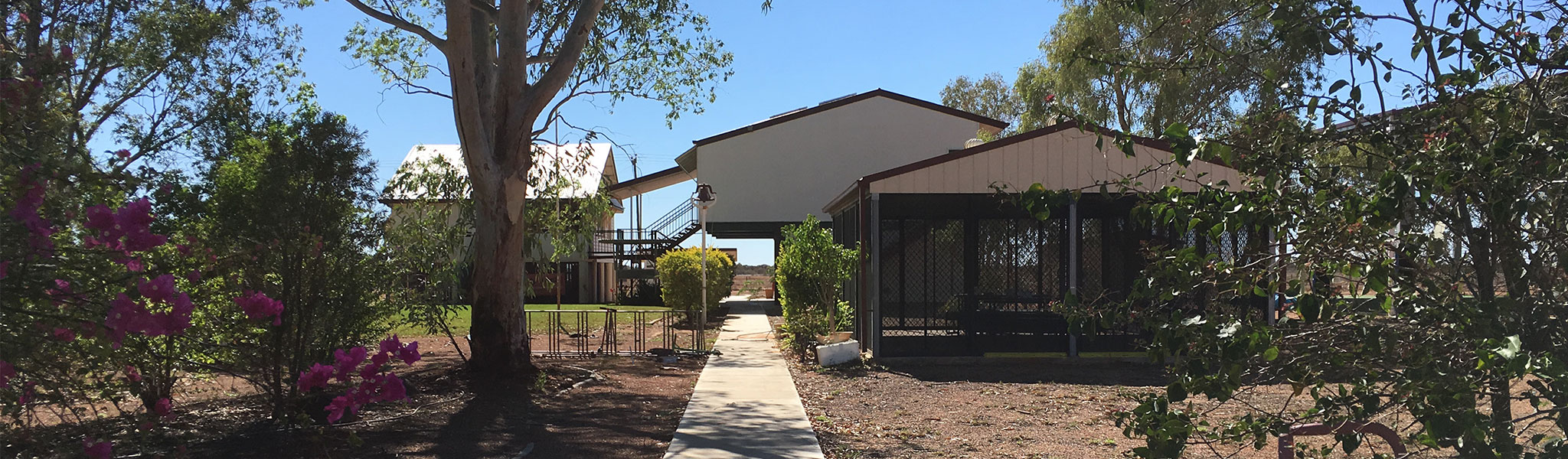
Jundah State School, 2022

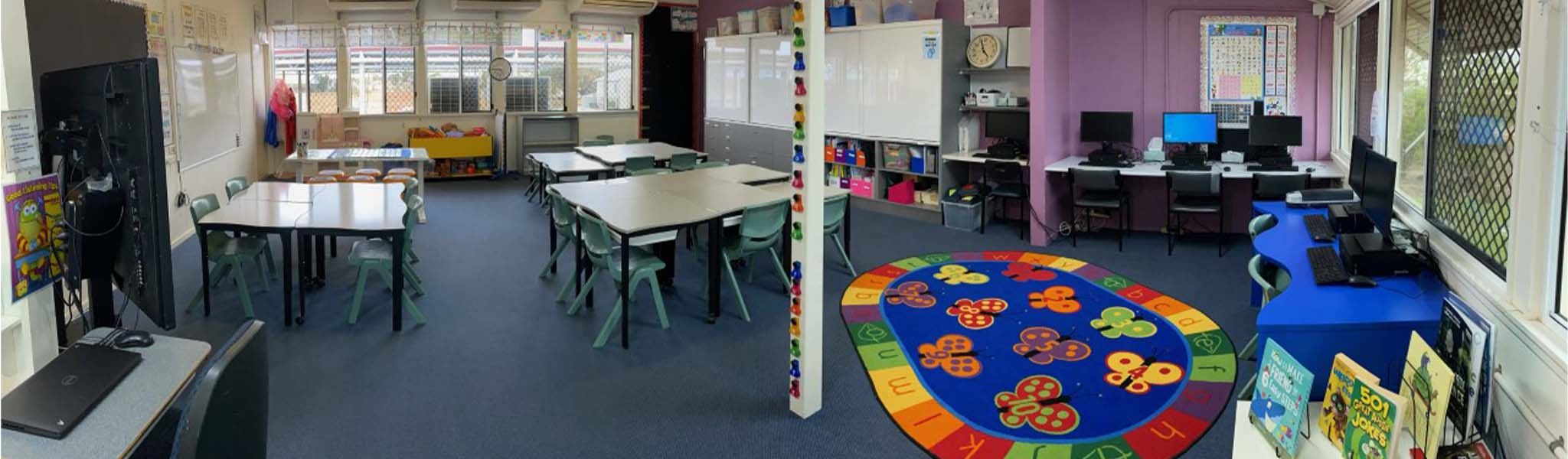
Classroom, Jundah State School, 2022

Jundah State School is a government primary (Early Childhood to Year 6) school for boys and girls at 11 Garrick Street (24.8304°S 143.0619°E). In 2017, the school had an enrolment of 6 students with 2 teachers and 5 non-teaching staff (2 full-time equivalent). In 2018, the school had an enrolment of 13 students with 2 teachers and 6 non-teaching staff (2 full-time equivalent).

There are no secondary schools in Jundah or nearby. The alternatives are distance education and boarding school.

== Attractions ==
The Barcoo Shire Museum is on the corner of Miles and Macrossan Streets (24.8297°S 143.0606°E). The museum is in the former administration centre of the Barcoo Shire Council, relocated to its present location.

Roughly 30 kilometres (19 mi) to the south east of the town is Welford National Park.

== Events ==
Each year the town celebrates German-Australian culture by holding "the world's most remote Oktoberfest".

Camel racing is held in Jundah.
