= Shire of Barcoo =

Coordinates: 25°17′16″S 141°58′18″E

- Local government area
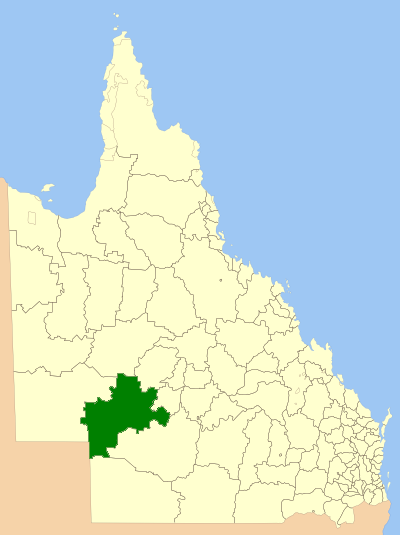
- Location within Queensland

- Interactive map of Shire of Barcoo
- Country: Australia
- State: Queensland
- Region: Central West Queensland
- Established: 1887
- Council seat: Jundah

Government
  - Mayor: Sally Elizabeth O'Neil
  - State electorate: Gregory
  - Federal division: Maranoa

Area
  - Total: 61,830 km^{2} (23,870 sq mi)

Population
  - Total: 308 (2021 census)
  - Density: 0.004981/km^{2} (0.012902/sq mi)
- Website: Shire of Barcoo
LGAs around Shire of Barcoo
Diamantina	Winton	Longreach
Diamantina	Shire of Barcoo	Longreach
Outback Areas (SA)	Bulloo	Quilpie

The Shire of Barcoo is a local government area in Central West Queensland, Australia.

It covers an area of 61,830 square kilometres (23,872.7 sq mi), and has existed as a local government entity since 1887. It is named for the Barcoo River which reaches a confluence with the Thomson River in the shire to form Cooper Creek.

The major industry in the shire is beef production and some opal mining. There has been some development of the known oil and gas reserves in the region.

In the 2021 census, the Shire of Barcoo had a population of 308 people.

== History ==
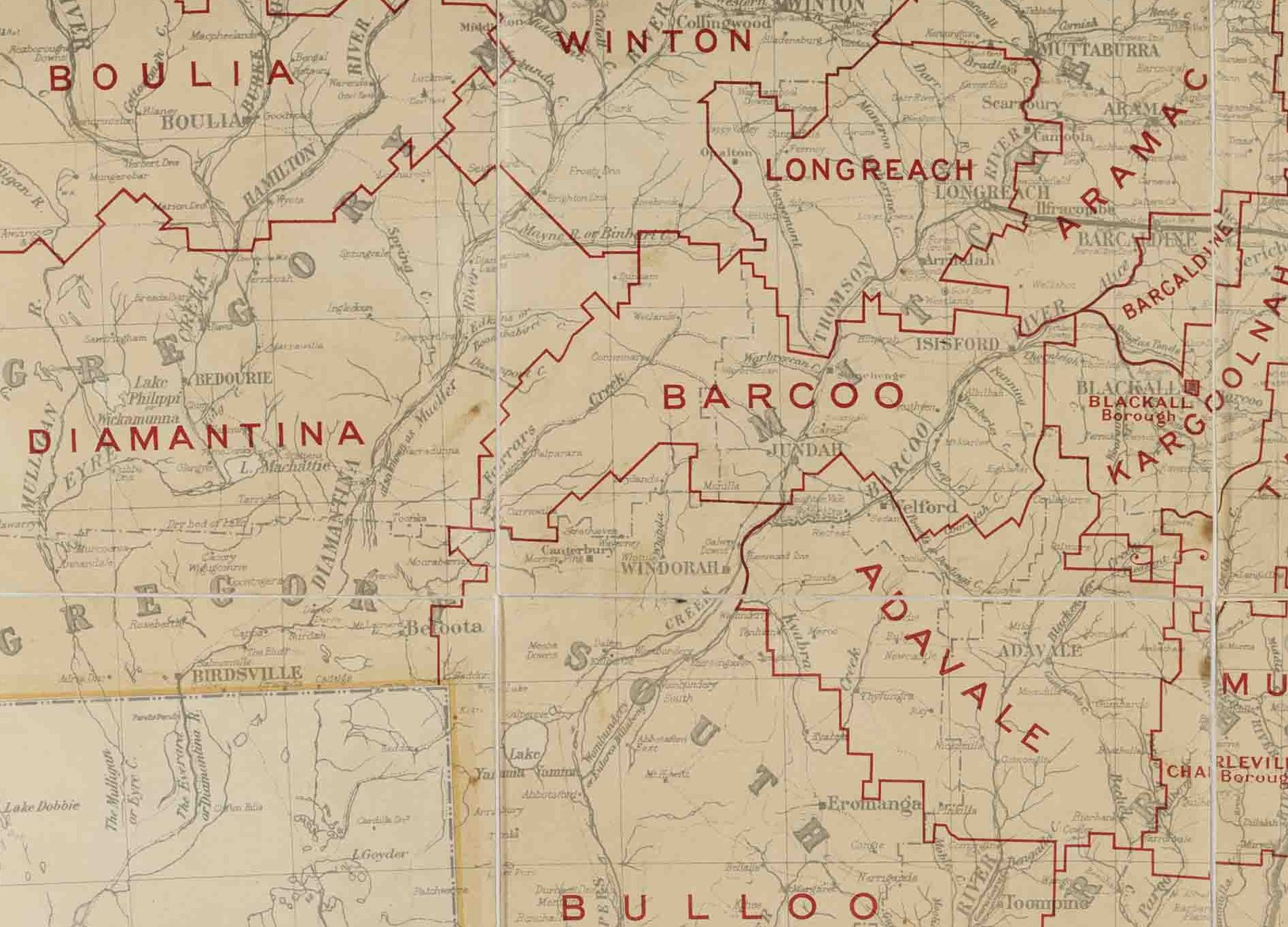
Map of Barcoo Division and adjacent local government areas, March 1902

Kuungkari (also known as Kungkari and Koonkerri) is a language of Western Queensland. The Kuungkari language region includes the landscape within the local government boundaries of Longreach Shire Council and Blackall-Tambo Shire Council.

The Barcoo Division was created on 24 December 1887 out of the eastern part of the Diamantina Division, and was subject to the Divisional Boards Act 1887.

In 1927, the council met at Stonehenge.

With the passage of the Local Authorities Act 1902, Barcoo Division became the Shire of Barcoo on 31 March 1903.

It subsequently lost areas when the shires of Isisford (1908) and Quilpie (1930) were incorporated.

Its present mayor, Sally O'Neil, has been in office since 2020.

== Towns and localities ==
The Shire of Barcoo includes the following settlements:

- Jundah
- Farrars Creek
- Stonehenge
- Tanbar Station
- Windorah

== Chairmen and mayors ==
- 1927: H. J. Cameron
- 2000–2012: Bruce Scott (unopposed 2008)
- 2012–2016: Julie Groves (unopposed)
- 2016–2020 : Bruce Scott
- 2020–present: Sally Elizabeth O'Neil

== Demographics ==
Year	Population	Notes
1933	957	
1947	835	
1954	1,010	
1961	1,037	
1966	909	
1971	734	
1976	657	
1981	711	
1986	566	
1991	556	
1996	492	
2001 census	576	
2006 census	360	
2011 census	350	
2016 census	267	
2021 census	308	

== Libraries ==
The Barcoo Shire Council operates public libraries at Jundah, Stonehenge, and Windorah.
