= Hell Hole Gorge National Park =

National park in Queensland, Australia

- IUCN category II (national park)
- Location within Queensland
- Location: Queensland
- Coordinates: 25.542°S 144.158°E
- Area: 127 km^{2} (49 sq mi)
- Established: 1994
- Governing body: Queensland Parks and Wildlife Service

Hell Hole Gorge National Park is a protected area in Adavale in the Shire of Quilpie in South West Queensland, Australia. It is 912 km west of Brisbane.

== Geography ==
The park is characterized by steep cliffs up to 45 metres high along Powell Creek and Spencer Creek. Notable waterholes are the Hell Hole Waterhole (0.38 hectares) and Spencer's Waterhole (0.22 hectares).

The average elevation of the terrain is 262 metres.

== History ==
In 1872, it was the site of a massacre of Aboriginal people that occurred as retribution for the killing of Richard Welford of nearby Welford Downs in 1872.

It was gazetted as a national park in 1994 under the Nature Conservation Act 1992.

== Flora ==
Some of the plants that come to life here after rain are Hakea maconochiena, Thryptomene hexandra, Acacia spania and Euphorbia sarcostemmoides.

== Amenities ==
A campground offering primitive camping is available, although no potable water is available on site. Access is possible only by four-wheel-drive vehicles.

== See also ==
- Protected areas of Queensland
