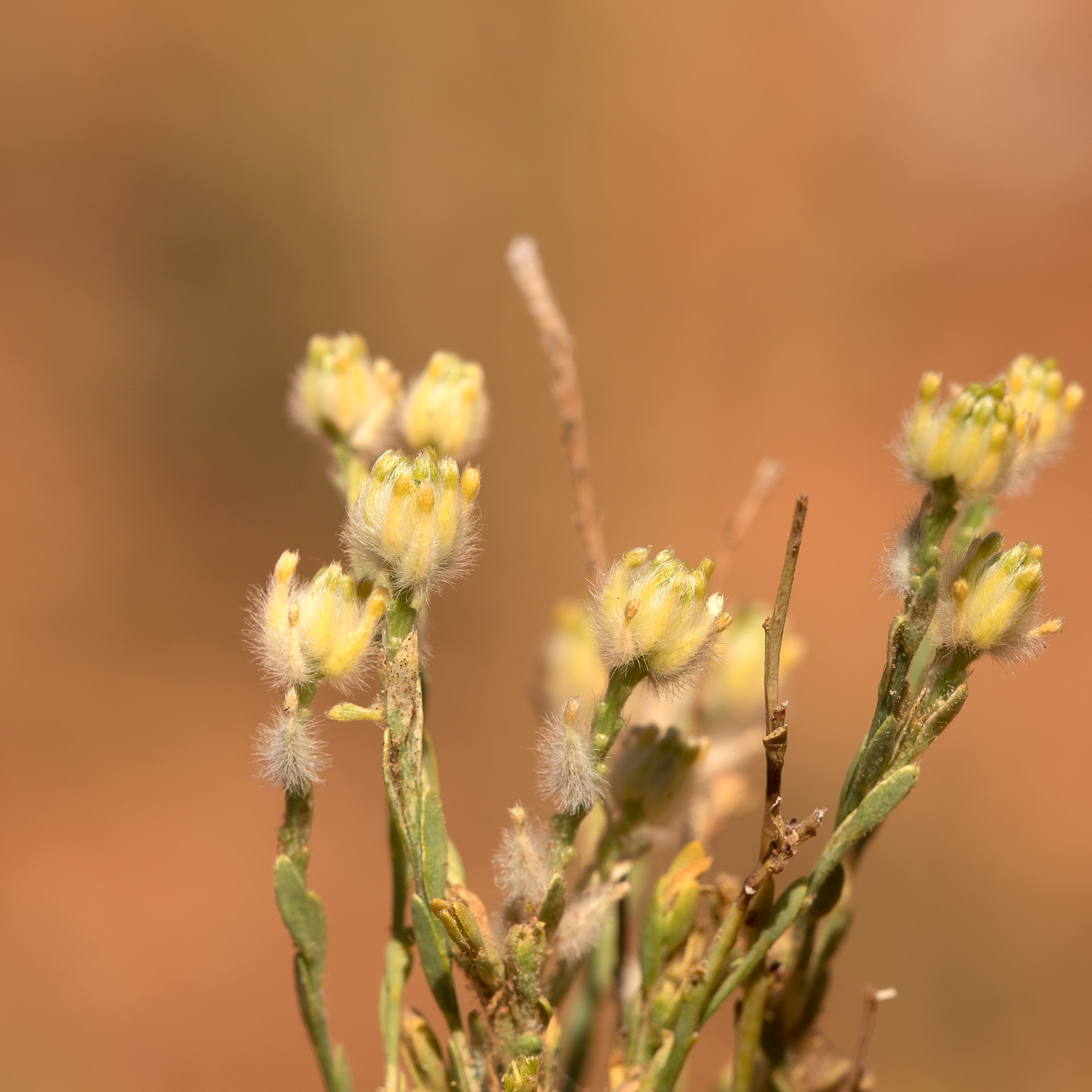
- Flowers of Pimelea trichostachya near Bourke, New South Wales

Scientific classification
- Kingdom: Plantae
- Clade: Tracheophytes
- Clade: Angiosperms
- Clade: Eudicots
- Clade: Rosids
- Order: Malvales
- Family: Thymelaeaceae
- Genus: Pimelea
- Species: P. trichostachya

Binomial name
- Pimelea trichostachya Lindl.

= Pimelea trichostachya =

Annual rice-flower

Species of shrub

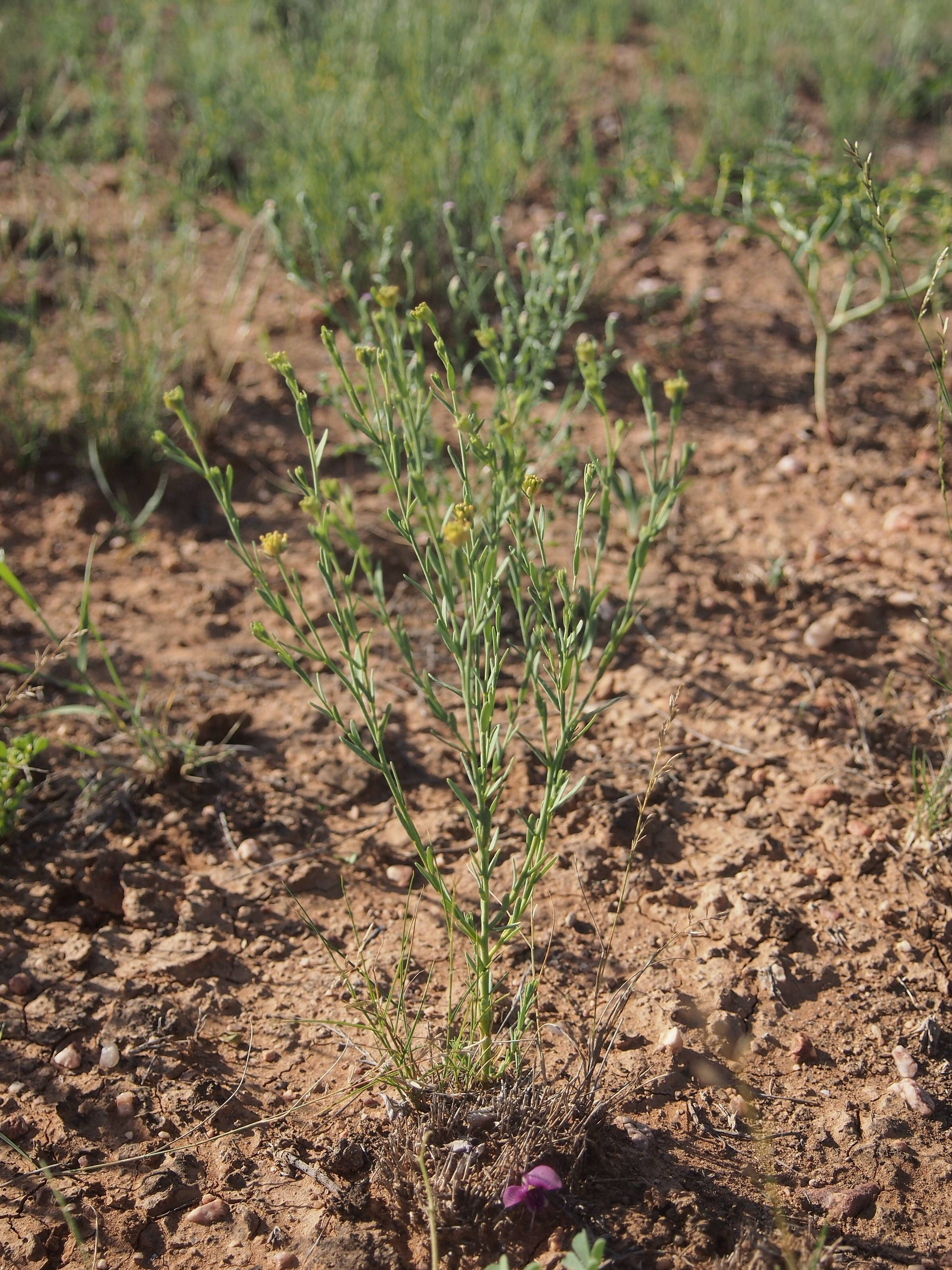
Habit northeast of Alice Springs

Pimelea trichostachya, commonly known as annual riceflower, spiked riceflower or flax weed, is a species of flowering plant in the family Thymelaeaceae and is endemic to continental Australia. It is a slender, semi-woody, annual shrub with narrowly elliptic or linear leaves and densely hairy, white or yellow flowers and green, purple-tinged fruit. It is toxic to livestock.

== Description ==
Pimelea trichostachya is a slender, erect, sem-woody annual shrub that typically grows to a height of up to 75 cm (30 in) and has hairy stems. The leaves are arranged alternately and are narrowly elliptic or linear, 4–19 mm (0.16–0.75 in) long and 0.5–5 mm (0.020–0.197 in) wide. The leaves are glabrous or sparsely hairy. The flowers are arranged in head-like spikes about 10 mm (0.39 in) long and wide, on the ends of branchlets on a peduncle up to 19 mm (0.75 in) long, each flower on a hairy pedicel. The flowers are bisexual, white or yellow and densely covered with long, spreading hairs. Flowering occurs in most months with a peak from August to December and the fruit is green with a purplish tinge and about 3 mm (0.12 in) long.

== Taxonomy ==
Pimelea trichostachya was first formally described in 1848 by John Lindley in Thomas Mitchell's Journal of an Expedition into the Interior of Tropical Australia. The specific epithet (trichostachya) means "hairy flower-spike".

== Distribution ==
Annual rice-flower mainly grows in deep sand im mallee and occurs in all mainland states and the Northern Territory, but is absent from most of the north of the country, from the east and west coasts and from most of Victoria.

== Effect on livestock ==
Pimelea trichostachya, along with P. simplex and P. elongata, is toxic to stock. The first cases of "St George disease" were reported in Queensland in 1921, but it was not until 1960 that pimelea poisoning was identified as the cause. Symptoms of poisoning in cattle include fluid swellings, mostly under the jaw, diarrhoea and weight loss. Horses and sheep are also susceptible.
