= Yapunyah waterhole =

Yapunyah Waterhole
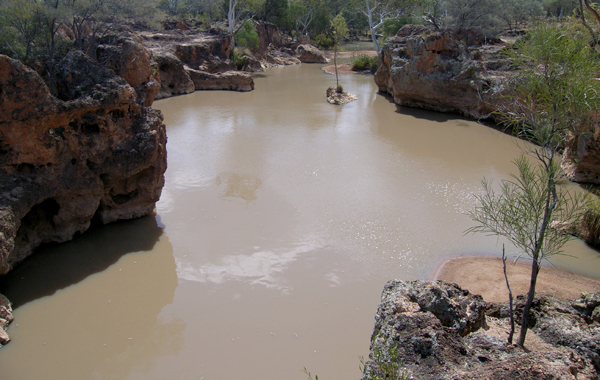
- The waterhole in 2011

- Location within Queensland Location within Australia
- Location: South West Queensland
- Coordinates: 25°29′08″S 144°18′43″E
- Lake type: Permanent waterhole
- Primary inflows: Nutting Creek
- Catchment area: Barcoo River
- Basin countries: Lake Eyre Basin, Australia
- Max. length: 2 km (1.2 mi)
- Surface area: 22 ha (54 acres)

Yapunyah Waterhole lies in the Mulga Lands bioregion of western Queensland. The waterhole is about two kilometres long and covers approximately 22 hectares when full. It is defined as a permanent waterhole in a region where permanent waterholes are extremely rare and therefore provide important refuges for aquatic plants and animals. These rare waterholes were also vital for Aboriginal people and provided both spiritual and physical nourishment.

The waterhole is on a cattle-grazing property where efforts are being made to preserve the biodiversity and associated cultural heritage. The property owners are working with the local natural resource management group, Desert Channels Queensland.

The Yapunyah Waterhole is a permanent waterhole in the Cooper Creek catchment and the Lake Eyre Basin. It lies in the Grey Range between Adavale and Yaraka in South West Queensland. The waterhole is fed by Nutting Creek, which starts at an elevation of 347 metres and drops around 85.5 metres over its 72 kilometre length before merging with Powell Creek. Powell Creek in turn flows through Hell Hole Gorge National Park to the south-west and eventually into the Barcoo River. The waterhole is surrounded by mulga Acacia aneura woodland. Rainfall averages 390 millimetres per year and is exceeded by evaporation of three to four metres per year.

== A permanent waterhole in a semi-arid landscape ==
Permanent waterholes are extremely rare in the arid and semi-arid landscapes of the Lake Eyre Basin. These rare, often isolated waterholes are of vital importance as biological refugia and underpin the health and vitality of the aquatic animals. Permanent waterholes have been defined as those that have not gone dry since European settlement and are generally about four metres deep when they cease to flow. They mostly occur on main rivers and creeks where they receive regular inundation. Rivers in the Lake Eyre Basin exist mostly as a series of ephemeral, semi-permanent and permanent waterholes and flow only seasonally in response to summer monsoonal rainfall in the upper catchments.

Aquatic organisms which lack desiccation-resistant life-stages (i.e. cannot survive 'drying out'), are reliant on refuges during drought, as are wetland-dependent organisms which do not readily disperse, or which cannot move long distances between isolated habitats. Such animals include all fish, some macroinvertebrates, the Cooper Creek Turtle Emydura macquarii emmotti and water rat Hydromys chrysogaster.

These waterholes also provide vital habitat for land mammals, reptiles, frogs and woodland birds that need to live near permanent water and/or that favour trees with hollows.

Permanent waterholes also tend to have consistently higher species diversity than ephemeral and semi-permanent waterholes and provide consistency and stability in a highly variable system. The reduction of rivers to a handful of waterholes during drought highlights both the importance and vulnerability of these refuges.

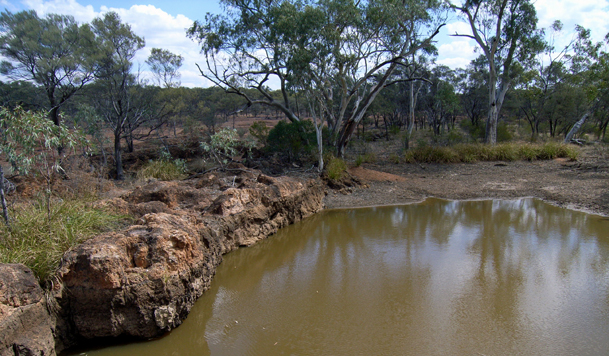
Riparian habitats

The main factors leading to the permanent nature of Yapunyah Waterhole include:

- The rocky substrate (bottom) which holds water;
- The steep nature of the surrounding landscape which causes scouring during high rainfall events and increases the depth. The steep (and rocky) landscape also protects it from drying winds;
- Local run-off from the adjacent hard country, tops up the waterhole during smaller rainfall events in the dry season; and
- The water is not used for domestic purposes because of its remote and inaccessible location.

== Habitats ==
Rockholes, ledges, overhangs and riparian zones at the waterhole provide a range of habitats for native flora and fauna, including the vulnerable yellow-footed rock wallaby and the endemic Cooper Creek Turtle. The Yapunyah waterhole is a healthy aquatic system with no evidence of introduced fish species, cane toads, weeds or feral mammals (such as pigs and goats). It has abundant wildlife and a unique environment that provides a refuge for native species to survive the dry times.

== Flora ==
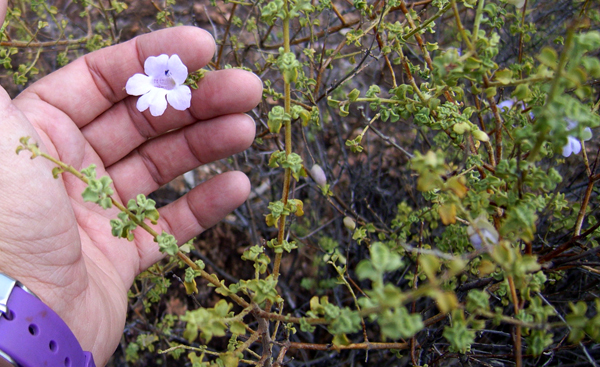
Mint bush (Prostanthera megacalyx)

The predominant vegetation surrounding the rocky edges of the waterhole and Nutting Creek is defined as a mulga Acacia aneura woodland. Other flora species documented in the riparian areas of the waterhole include: river red gum E. camaldulensis, ghost gum Corymbia aparrerinja, bendee Acacia calendulata, lancewood Acacia shirleyi, narrow-leafed hop bush Dodonaea viscosa var angustissima, Grampians, hook-leaf and rock Thryptomenes (Thryptomene sp.), inland spur-flower Plectranthus intraterraneus, mint bush Prostanthera megacalyx and red ash Alphitonia excelsa. Two species of flora identified at Yapunyah Waterhole that usually occur further to the east include: Quinine bush Petalostigma pubescens and Reed grass Arundinella nepalensis.

== Fauna ==
=== Cooper Creek Turtle ===
The Cooper Creek Turtle Emydura macquarii emmottii is found only in the Lake Eyre Basin. It is a short-necked turtle and one of the largest species of side-necked turtle in Australia; weighing up to eight kilograms and growing over 40 centimetres in length.

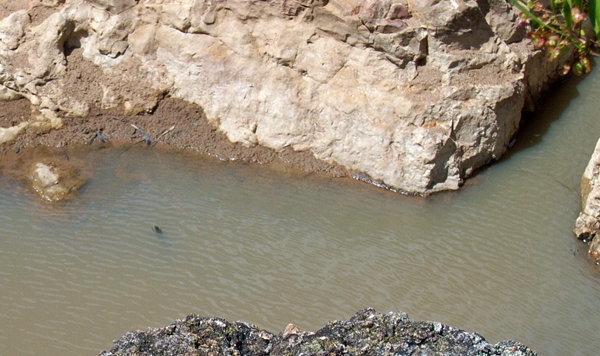
A Cooper Creek Turtle (Emydura sp.) surfaces

Permanent waterholes are dominated by adult turtles in high densities; semi-permanent waterholes are dominated by juveniles and ephemeral waterholes contain no turtle populations. Adult turtles are regularly seen swimming and surfacing at the Yapunyah Waterhole.

=== Yellow-footed rock wallaby ===
The yellow-footed rock wallaby Petrogale xanthopus is recognized as a distinct sub-species in Queensland (Petrogale xanthopus celeris), and only occurs in rugged country in a triangular area between Adavale, Blackall and Stonehenge. Within this range the rock wallabies live in a number of colonies in Idalia, Welford and Hell Hole Gorge National Parks and also on private land (such as "Bulloo Lakes" station). The rocky ledges and overhangs of Yapunyah Waterhole provide habitat for yellow-footed rock wallabies and they are often observed drinking there. The yellow-footed rock wallaby is listed as vulnerable under the Commonwealth Environment Protection and Biodiversity Conservation Act 1999 (EPBC Act).

=== Fish ===
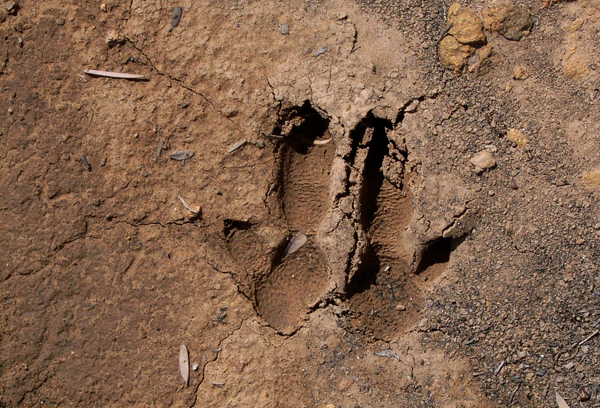
Yellow-footed rock wallaby (Petrogale xanthopus) footprints.

Permanent waterholes provide important fish habitat in south-western Queensland. They are vital for several endemic and near-endemic species including: Lake Eyre yellow belly (Macquaria sp.) and related species and Cooper Creek tandan (Neosilurus sp.). Other fishes include hardy heads (Craterocephalus sp.) and gudgeons (Hypseleotris sp.).

Fish species identified in the nearby Nutting Creek include: Spangled perch (Leiopotherapon unicolour), Bony bream (Nematalosa erebi) and Desert rainbow fish (Melanotaenia splendida tatei). Other aquatic species include: Freshwater prawn (Macrobrachium australiense) and Blue Claw (Cherax destructor).

== Cultural heritage ==
Permanent and semi-permanent waterholes in the arid zone were vital places for Aboriginal people over thousands of years. River and creek courses provided natural routes or corridors for people to travel through the area and reliable waterholes acted as vital nodes along these routes. Unsurprisingly, given their immense value, waterholes were also rich in mythology and regarded as places of spiritual as well as physical nourishment. Evidence suggests that the Yapunyah Waterhole was an important place for Aboriginal people. It is likely that this location would have been beneficial for food, bush medicines, water and raw materials for stone tools. With Indigenous involvement, the current property owners are ensuring preservation and protection of this significant waterhole now and into the future.

== Pastoral settlement history ==
The Yapunyah Waterhole is one of numerous permanent waterholes on "Bulloo Lakes" station; a cattle grazing property south-west of Blackall. The first record of European settlement of the area now known as "Bulloo Lakes" station (originally called "Kenilworth") shows a lease taken up on 1 July 1864 by J Mollison, Black and Smith. In 1866 it was transferred to William Sloane and in 1867 to John Earles. In 1886 "Kenilworth" was consolidated with other blocks and named "Kilcumin".

"Bulloo Lakes" on the eastern side of the Bulloo River was a block taken off "Milo" and drawn by a Mr Andy Madden (prior to the 1930s (precise date unknown)) and there's a record stating that the Madden's lived in a log cabin with a dirt floor. Harry Richardson bought "Bulloo Lakes" from Andy Madden in Ann De Hennin's name with 800 head of cattle (date unknown). (The Lands Department would not allow Mr Richardson to hold the property as only a certain area could be leased by one person). During the 1930s it was bought by Harry Richardson and taken over by Jim Richardson. The property has changed hands two more times before being purchased by the current owners in the mid-2000s.

== Management and protection ==
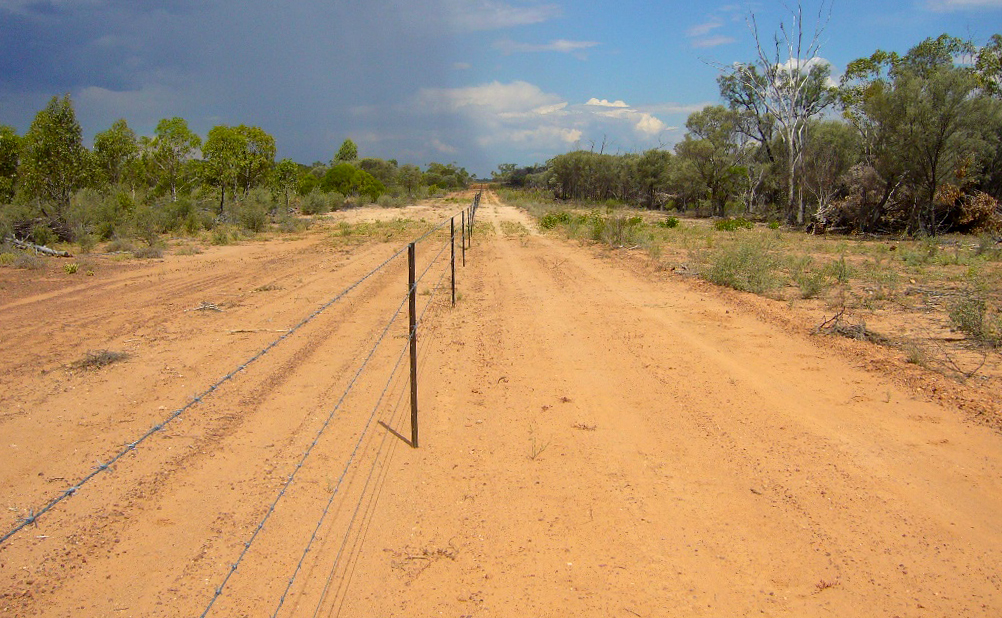
Fencing projects complete

There is a recognised need to protect the fragile wetlands in this region and landowners like the current owners of "Bulloo Lakes" Station are taking measures to ensure this occurs.

Increasing vegetation coverage and excluding livestock from creek corridors stabilises the environment and significantly contributes to protecting the wetlands of this region. This was achieved at Yapunyah Waterhole by erecting thirteen kilometres of fencing in 2008, 20 kilometres of fencing in 2011 and then a further 25 kilometres of fencing in 2012 to complete a stock proof enclosure around the waterhole. They've also put other vital measures in place such as relocating watering points to better manage grazing and its impacts.

The fencing in 2008 also enabled the protection of a section of Nutting Creek and protected 243 hectares of riparian vegetation and 4,615 hectares in total. The fencing in 2011 further protected Yapunyah Waterhole and also helped protect Kokanah Waterhole on Powell Creek. With all three fences in place, the land managers can totally exclude stock from the Yapunyah and Kokanah Waterholes and adjacent areas of the Nutting and Powell Creeks; an area of 6,477 hectares in total.

To ensure continued protection and as part of their property management plan, the land owners also exclude stock from the fenced area (other than for fire risk management); maintain the new fencing; monitor watering points; complete an annual monitoring of waterhole and creek areas; record sightings of wallaby species and maintain fire and pest risk management plans. Desert Channels Queensland (the local natural resource management group) provided assistance to protect these vital wetlands through the funding of two grants for the fencing projects in 2008 and 2011. The owners of "Gooyeah" station (neighbouring "Bulloo Lakes") also contributed towards the fencing in 2011. These fencing projects have improved the capacity to manage the land while protecting fragile riparian areas and conserving an important ecosystem to the benefit of native flora and fauna.

While there is no public access to Yapunyah Waterhole, the owners of "Bulloo Lakes" Station are keen for other landholders and locals in the area to "discover evidence of, and develop respect for the cultural and natural heritage of the area". They have conducted a study trip at the waterhole for interested parties and shared the outcomes of this best practice wetland management. The landholders would like to hear from people who are genuinely interested in helping to protect this relatively undisturbed and unique area.

== Knowledge gaps ==
The Yapunyah waterhole's remote and inaccessible location has limited the gathering of survey data and other information on the ecology of the area. Full surveys of flora, fauna and wetland habitats have not yet been fully documented. In a fact sheet developed by the Environmental Protection Agency, it says this wetland type is relatively well known in south-western Queensland in terms of ecology and species diversity; the fact sheet also contains a full list of commonly found flora and fauna (including birds).
