= Quilpie, Queensland =

Quilpie
- Town
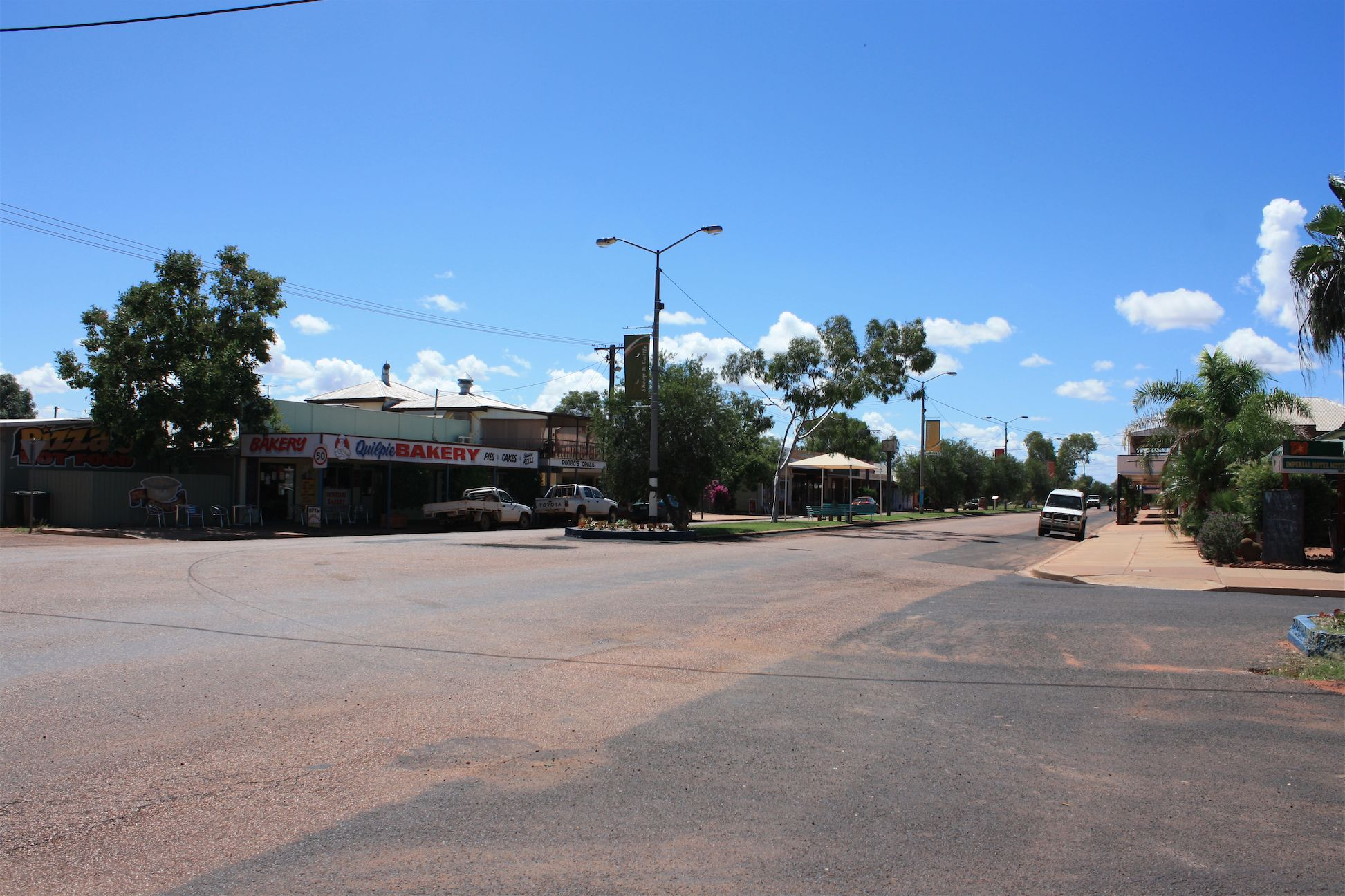
- Brolga St, the main street of Quilpie

- Interactive map of Quilpie
- Coordinates: 26.6161°S 144.2675°E
- Country: Australia
- State: Queensland
- LGA: Shire of Quilpie
- Location: 211 km (131 mi) W of Charleville; 478 km (297 mi) W of Roma; 829 km (515 mi) W of Toowoomba; 1,099 km (683 mi) W of Brisbane
- Established: 1917

Government
  - State electorate: Warrego
  - Federal division: Maranoa

Area
  - Total: 17,847.0 km^{2} (6,890.8 sq mi)

Population
  - Total: 1,039 (2021 census)
  - Density: 0.058217/km^{2} (0.15078/sq mi)
- Time zone: UTC+10:00 (AEST)
- Postcode: 4480
Localities around Quilpie
Eromanga	Adavale	Adavale
Eromanga	Quilpie	Humeburn
Thargomindah	Thargomindah	Yowah

Quilpie (/ˈkwɪlpi/ KWIL-pee) is a rural town and locality in the Shire of Quilpie, Queensland, Australia. In the 2021 census, the locality of Quilpie had a population of 530.

The town is the administrative centre of the Quilpie Shire local government area. The town of Toompine is also within the locality.

The economy of the area is based on the grazing and mining industries. The area has one of the largest deposits of boulder opal in the world, and also has extensive deposits of gas and oil.

== Geography ==
Quilpie is in Channel Country on the banks of the Bulloo River. It is on the Diamantina Developmental Road, 211 kilometres (131 mi) west of Charleville, 829 kilometres (515 mi) west of Toowoomba and 1,099 kilometres (683 mi) west of the state capital, Brisbane. Quilpie is the administrative centre of the Quilpie Shire.

The town of Quilpie is in the north of the locality, while the smaller town of Toompine (27.2225°S 144.3611°E) is in the south of the locality.

== History ==
Quilpie is believed to lie on the border of the Bunthamurra and Margany Indigenous Australian tribal areas.

Margany (also known as Marganj, Mardigan, Marukanji, Maranganji) is an Australian Aboriginal language spoken by the Margany people. The Margany language region includes the landscape within the local government boundaries of the Quilpie Shire, taking in Quilpie, Cheepie and Beechal extending towards Eulo and Thargomindah, as well as the properties of Dynevor Downs and Ardoch.

The township of Toompine was surveyed in 1870. The name Toompine is an Indigenous language word meaning leech.

Goombie State School opened on Goombie Station (north of the town of Quilpie at 26.1126°S 144.1348°E) on 27 January 1875 and closed on 9 December 1977.

Toompine Provisional School and Duck Creek Provisional School both opened in 1900. In 1901, they became half-time schools (meaning they shared a single teacher between the two schools). Toompine Provisional School closed in July 1902, enabling Duck Creek Provisional School to revert to full-time status. Due to low student numbers, Duck Creek Provisional School closed in 1905.

Quilpie was gazetted as a town in 1917 owing to the Western railway line that was laid down from Brisbane. It takes its name from the Indigenous Australian word for stone curlew, quilpeta. The name was proposed by pastoralist James Hammond of Tenham Station. The Queensland Railways Department mistakenly named the railway station Quillpill. The town and station name were standardised to Quilpie on 16 June 1917 by the Governor in Council.

Quilpie State School opened on 10 September 1918. The school began offering secondary education in 1966. On 5 December 2008, it was renamed Quilpie State College.

The first post office was opened in 1921. Two years later the telephone reached Quilpie .

A fire destroyed a block of the main street in 1926. With no town water the residents watched helplessly.

In 1927, the first court house was established.

Prior to 1930, Quilpie was within the Shire of Adavale, headquartered at Adavale. However, the decision to route the railway line through Quilpie rather than Adavale had led to a population drift away from Adavale making Quilpie the larger town. On 17 July 1930, there was a re-organisation of local government in the district, resulting in the abolition of the Shire of Adavale and the creation of the Shire of Quilpie with Quilpie as its headquarters.

St Finbarr's Catholic Church was officially opened and dedicated on Sunday 14 December 1930 by the Bishop of Toowoomba, James Byrne. It was built from timber. In 1972, it was replaced with a brick church designed by W. Durack.

A bore was sunk into the Great Artesian Basin in 1933. It provided drinking water for the town and between 1952 and 1963 the hot water was used to generate electricity for the town.

On 15 October 1936, St Matthew's Anglican Church was officially opened and dedicated by Bishop Dixon. It was built from timber and could seat 100 people. The church bell was donated by the people of Cunnamulla.

St Finbarr's Catholic School opened in early 1950, shortly after the arrival in January 1950 of three Sisters of St Joseph of the Sacred Heart, Sisters Macrina, Carmel and Magdalen. By the end of 1950, over 60 children were enrolled. A boarding school for boys and girls was opened in 1951. The first lay teacher, Michael West, was appointed in 1983. When the boarding facility closed in 2008, it was the last rural Catholic primary boarding school in Queensland. In 2009, the first lay principal, Aaron Wells, was appointed and the administration of the school passed from the Sisters to the Catholic Education Office of the Roman Catholic Diocese of Toowoomba who operate the school in the Mary MacKillop tradition (MacKillop being the founder of the Sisters of St Joseph).

From 1954 to 1994, The Westlander was split at Charleville. the Quilpie Section (3Q02) was known as the "Flying Flea" and it consisted of two passenger carriages, a guards van and power van. Both 3Q02 and 3V02 were withdrawn in 1994 and replaced by TrainLink bus services.

The current Quilpie Public Library building opened in 2005.

== Demographics ==
In the 2021 census, the locality of Quilpie had a population of 530. 15.1% of the population identified as Aboriginal and/or Torres Strait Islander and around 11% born outside Australia.

In the 2016 census, the locality of Quilpie had a population of 595. 19.9% of the population identified as Aboriginal and/or Torres Strait Islander and around 10% born outside Australia.

In the 2011 census, the locality of Quilpie had a population of 574. 14.5% of the population identified as Aboriginal and/or Torres Strait Islander and around 9% born outside Australia.

In the 2006 census, the town of Quilpie had a population of 560. 14.1% of the population identified as Aboriginal and/or Torres Strait Islander and around 10% born outside Australia.

In the 2001 census, the town of Quilpie had a population of 645. 9.5% of the population identified as Aboriginal and/or Torres Strait Islander and around 9% were born outside Australia.

== Economy ==
The area is wholly devoted to grazing. Boulder opal, oil and gas mining are major secondary industries for the local economy. The majority of the employees of these industries are local residents, with low rates of both unemployment and itinerant work.

Quilpie has one opal mining field; Toompine Field is located between Quilpie and Yowah.

== Flora and fauna ==
The most common species of trees in the district are:

- Mulga
- Gidgee
- Red river gum
- Bloodwood
- Sandalwood
- Beefwood

There are a large range of animals (including reptiles and insects) that can be found in the area including:

- Bearded dragon
- Sand goanna (Varanus gouldii) – bungarra in some aboriginal languages
- Black-headed python
- Inland taipan (Oxyuranus microlepidotus) – also known as western taipan and fierce snake
- Mulga snake (Pseudechis australis) – also known as the king brown
- Brolga (Grus rubicunda)
- Emu (Dromaius novaehollandiae)
- Wedge-tailed eagle (Aquila audax)
- Red kangaroo (Macropus rufus)
- Eastern grey kangaroo (Macropus giganteus)
- Common wallaroo (Macropus robustus)
- Bilby (Macrotis lagotis)
- Water rat (Hydromys chrysogaster)
- Dingo

== Amenities ==
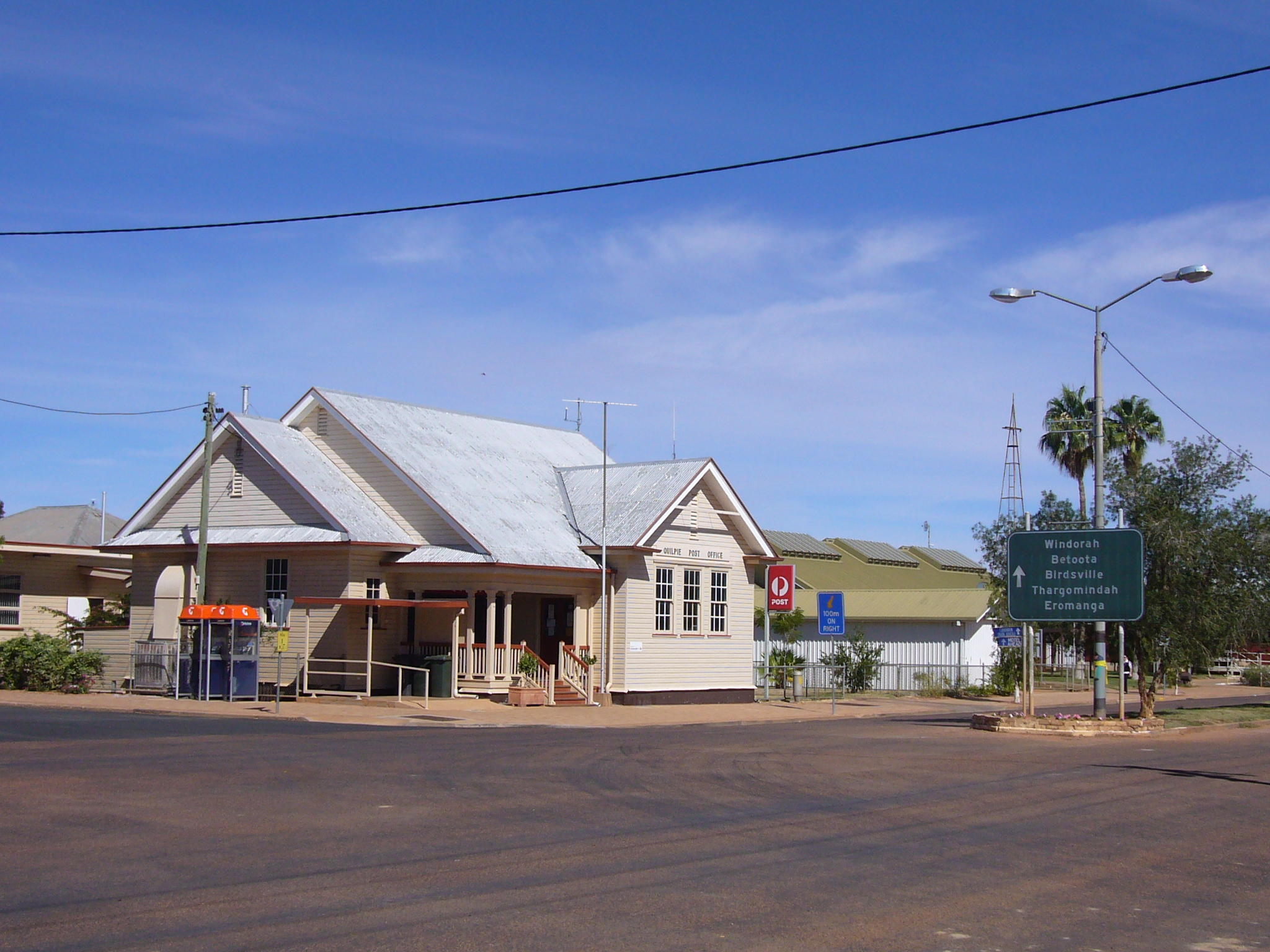
Quilpie post office, 2007

Quilpie residents enjoy free access to many amenities including a post office, the town library, swimming pool, golf course, museum, sports grounds, an air-conditioned hall and supper room etc. There are well stocked stores and plenty of attractions for visitors with displays of opals and the works of local artists and as well as an information centre. The Brick Hotel has been restored to house displays of opal and art and provide a community learning space.

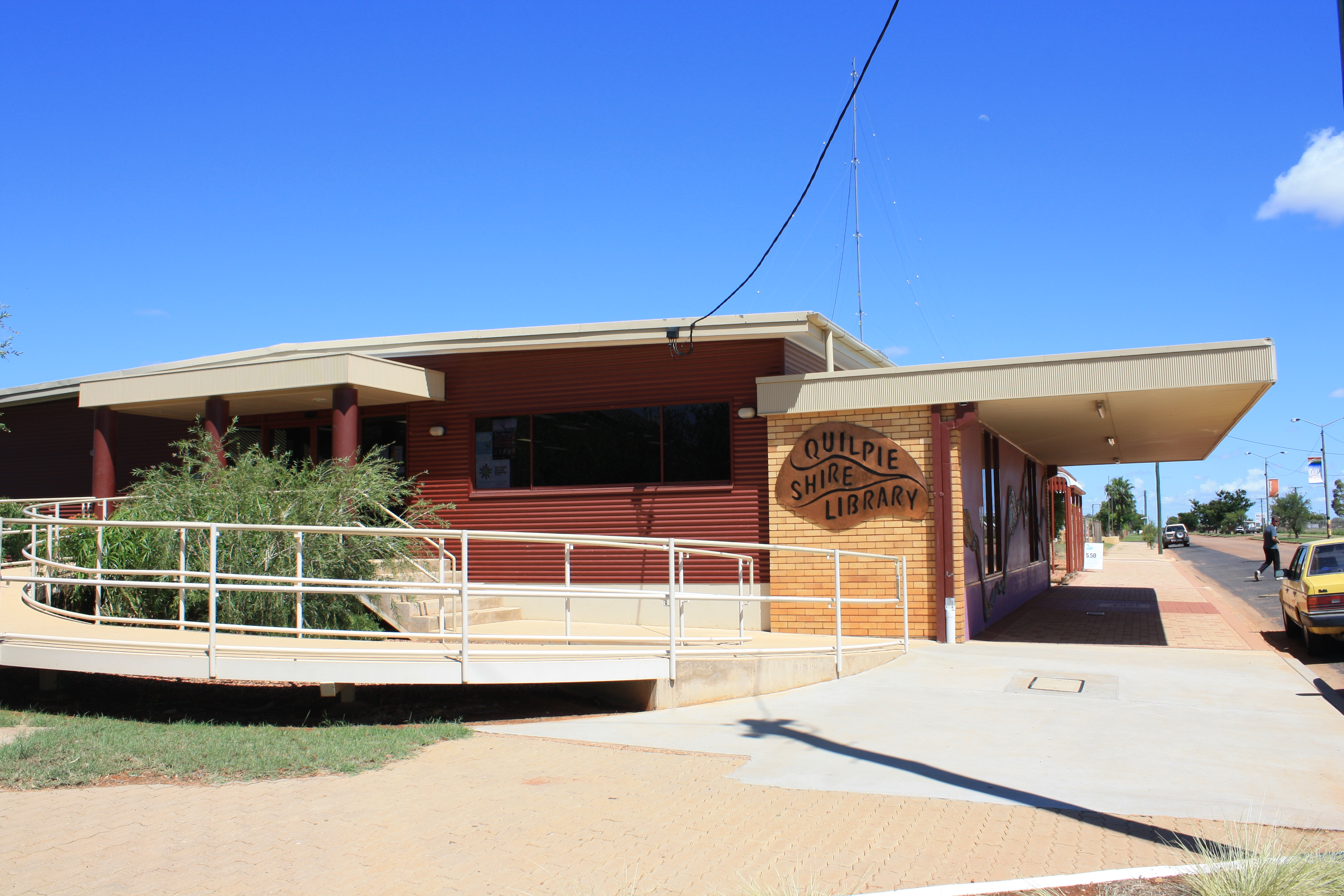
Quilpie public library, 2012

Quilpie Shire Council operates Quilpie Shire Library at 52 Brolga Street.

The Quilpie branch of the Queensland Country Women's Association has its rooms at 17 Brolga Street.

St Finbarr's Catholic Church is on the south-east corner of Bulnbuln Street and Quarrion Street (26.616203°S 144.2692°E). The altar and baptismal font are decorated with local opals.

St Matthew's Anglican Church is on the north-west corner of Bulnbuln Street and Quarrion Street (26.615601°S 144.2689°E).

== Education ==
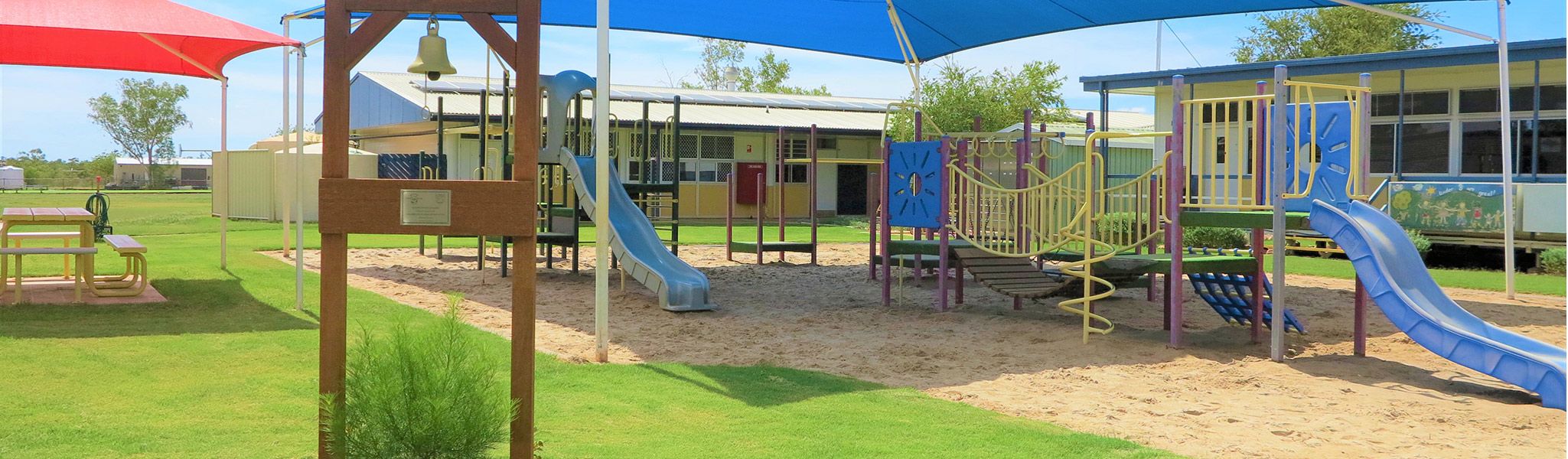
Playground, Quilpie State School, 2023

Quilpie State College is a government primary and secondary (Early Childhood to Year 10) school for boys and girls at the corner of Chulungra and Boonkai Streets (26.6149°S 144.2714°E). In 2017, the school had an enrolment of 61 students with 12 teachers (11 full-time equivalent) and 12 non-teaching staff (9 full-time equivalent). In 2018, the school had an enrolment of 65 students with 13 teachers (12 full-time equivalent) and 12 non-teaching staff (9 full-time equivalent).

St Finbarr's School is a Catholic primary (Preparatory to Year 6) school for boys and girls at Jabiru Street (26.6167°S 144.2701°E). In 2017, the school had an enrolment of 30 students with 5 teachers (3 full-time equivalent) and 5 non-teaching staff (2 full-time equivalent). In 2018, the school had an enrolment of 26 students with 4 teachers (3 full-time equivalent) and 3 non-teaching staff (2 full-time equivalent).

For students wanting to study Years 11 and 12, the closest secondary school is Charleville State High School in Charleville, 211 kilometres (131 mi) to the east. Alternatively, Year 11 and 12 students can also study using distance education provided by the Charleville School of Distance Education or move away to various boarding schools.

== Climate ==
Quilpie experiences a hot semi-arid climate (Köppen: BSh), with very hot, somewhat rainy summers and mild, dry winters. Average maxima strongly vary from season to season: between 37.0 °C (98.6 °F) in January and 20.1 °C (68.2 °F) in July. Annual precipitation is rather low, averaging 347.3 mm (13.67 in), with a summer maximum. The town is very sunny, with 195.9 clear days and only 62.3 cloudy days annually. Extreme temperatures have ranged from 47.1 °C (116.8 °F) on 3 January 2014 to −2.3 °C (27.9 °F) on 2 July 1977.

Climate data for Quilpie (26º36'36"S, 144º15'36"E, 200 m AMSL) (1917–2024 normals, extremes 1957–2014)
Month	Jan	Feb	Mar	Apr	May	Jun	Jul	Aug	Sep	Oct	Nov	Dec	Year
Record high °C (°F)	47.1 (116.8)	45.5 (113.9)	42.9 (109.2)	38.4 (101.1)	34.5 (94.1)	32.1 (89.8)	29.4 (84.9)	37.0 (98.6)	40.1 (104.2)	43.8 (110.8)	44.9 (112.8)	46.2 (115.2)	47.1 (116.8)
Mean daily maximum °C (°F)	37.0 (98.6)	35.6 (96.1)	33.4 (92.1)	29.2 (84.6)	24.0 (75.2)	20.4 (68.7)	20.1 (68.2)	22.7 (72.9)	27.1 (80.8)	31.0 (87.8)	34.0 (93.2)	36.3 (97.3)	29.2 (84.6)
Mean daily minimum °C (°F)	23.8 (74.8)	23.3 (73.9)	20.5 (68.9)	15.6 (60.1)	10.9 (51.6)	7.4 (45.3)	6.1 (43.0)	7.7 (45.9)	11.7 (53.1)	16.1 (61.0)	19.6 (67.3)	22.2 (72.0)	15.4 (59.7)
Record low °C (°F)	13.7 (56.7)	13.3 (55.9)	9.6 (49.3)	3.5 (38.3)	1.0 (33.8)	−1.2 (29.8)	−2.3 (27.9)	−1.0 (30.2)	2.1 (35.8)	5.4 (41.7)	8.6 (47.5)	12.3 (54.1)	−2.3 (27.9)
Average precipitation mm (inches)	52.1 (2.05)	49.3 (1.94)	43.6 (1.72)	24.2 (0.95)	26.3 (1.04)	19.6 (0.77)	16.2 (0.64)	13.1 (0.52)	14.9 (0.59)	22.7 (0.89)	30.5 (1.20)	34.4 (1.35)	347.3 (13.67)
Average precipitation days (≥ 1.0 mm)	4.1	3.7	3.1	1.9	2.3	2.2	2.0	1.5	1.9	2.8	3.3	3.7	32.5
Average afternoon relative humidity (%)	26	31	29	29	35	39	35	28	24	22	21	22	28
Average dew point °C (°F)	11.3 (52.3)	12.3 (54.1)	10.0 (50.0)	7.3 (45.1)	6.3 (43.3)	4.9 (40.8)	2.4 (36.3)	1.3 (34.3)	1.4 (34.5)	3.4 (38.1)	5.7 (42.3)	7.9 (46.2)	6.2 (43.1)
Source: Bureau of Meteorology (1917–2024 normals, extremes 1957–2014)

== Events ==
- The Pride of the West festival is held in September every year.
- The Quilpie Cup Races
- The Kangaranga Do festival is held in September every year on the Tuesday before the Birdsville Races.

== Notable people from Quilpie ==
- Michael Atkinson, journalist
- Vaughan Johnson, Queensland state politician
- Ewen Jones, Australian federal politician
- Donald Markwell, social scientist and educational leader
- Sandy McPhie, former Queensland state politician
- Justine Saunders, Australian actor

== Gallery ==
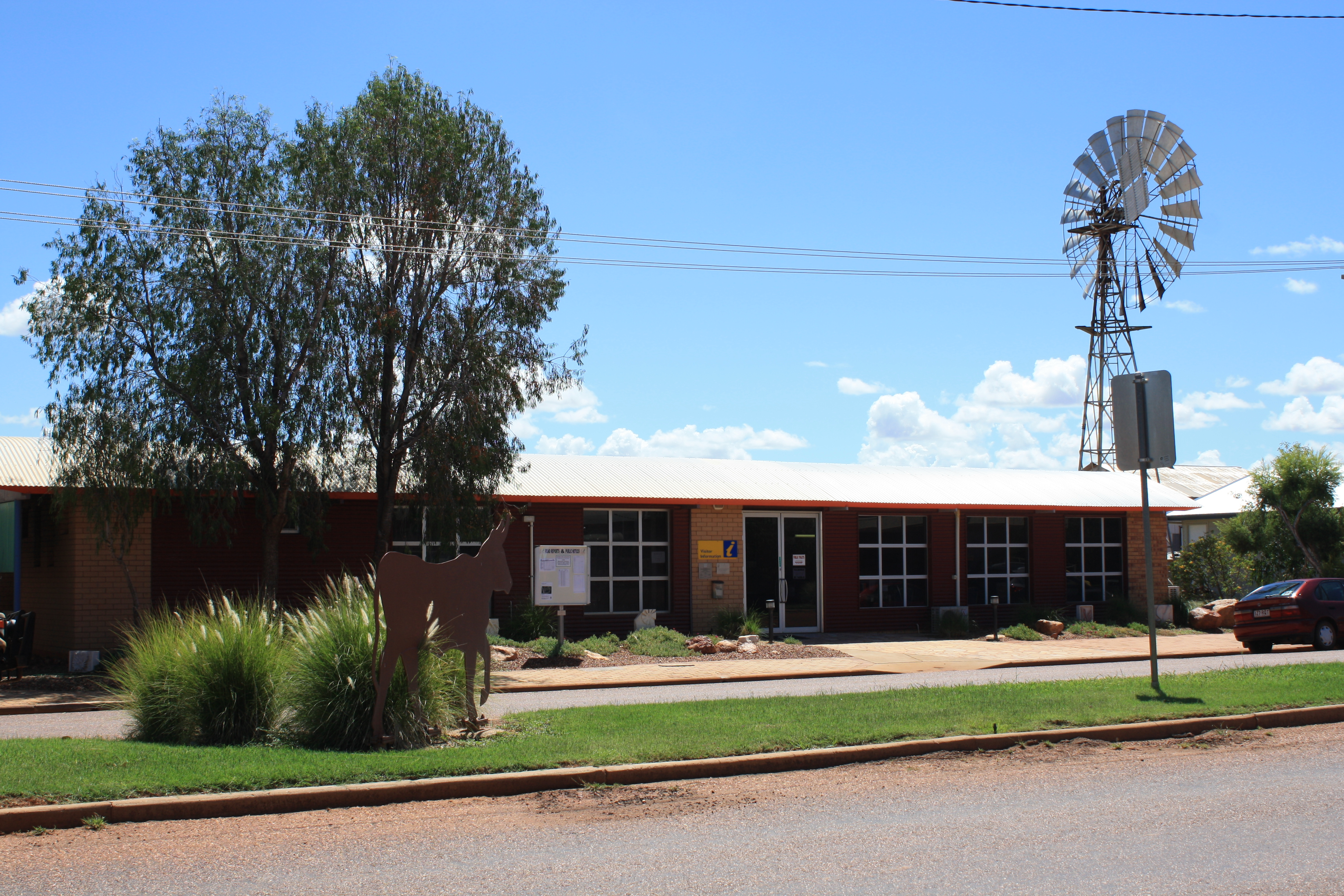
Quilpie Visitors Centre and regional art gallery

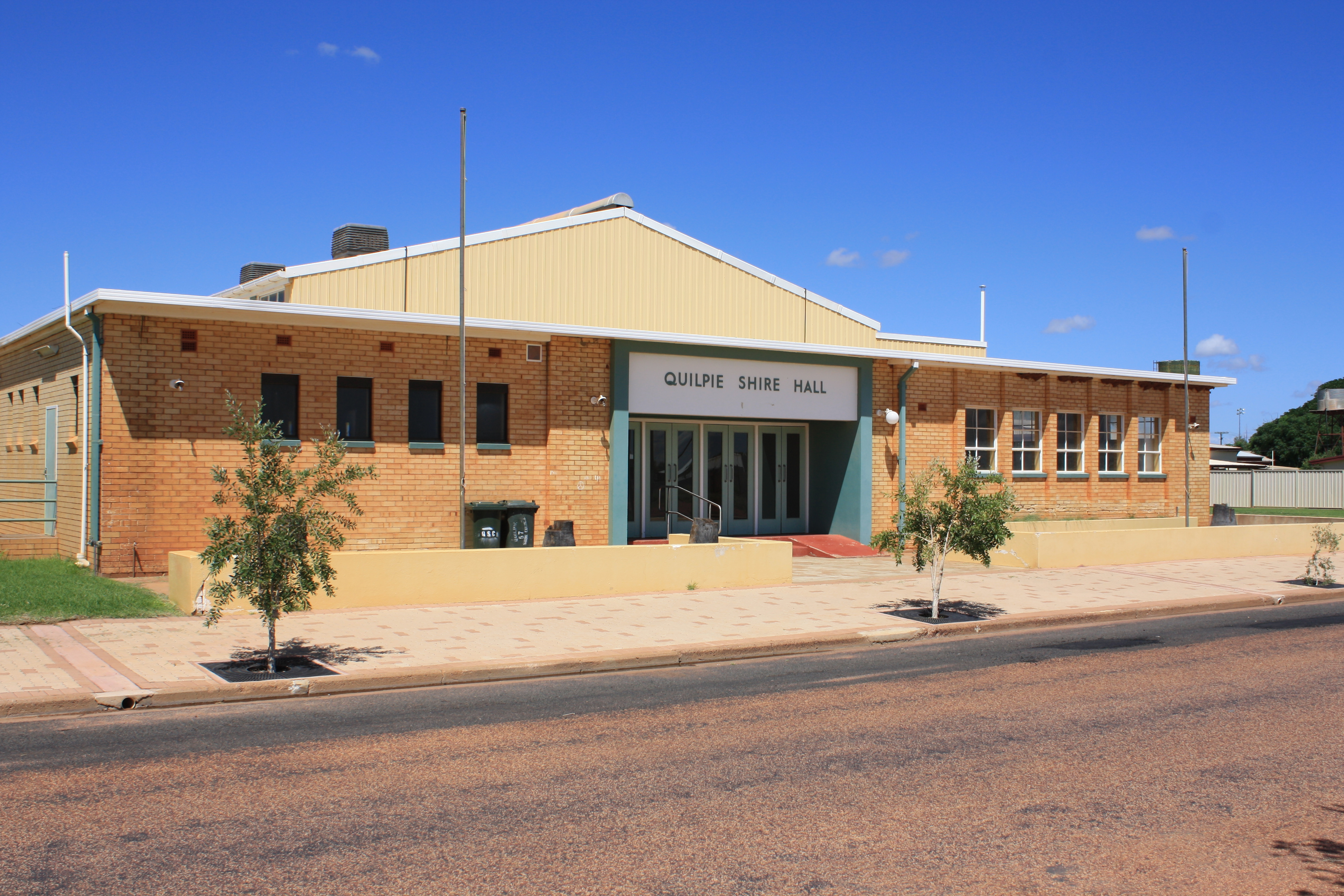
Quilpie Shire Hall

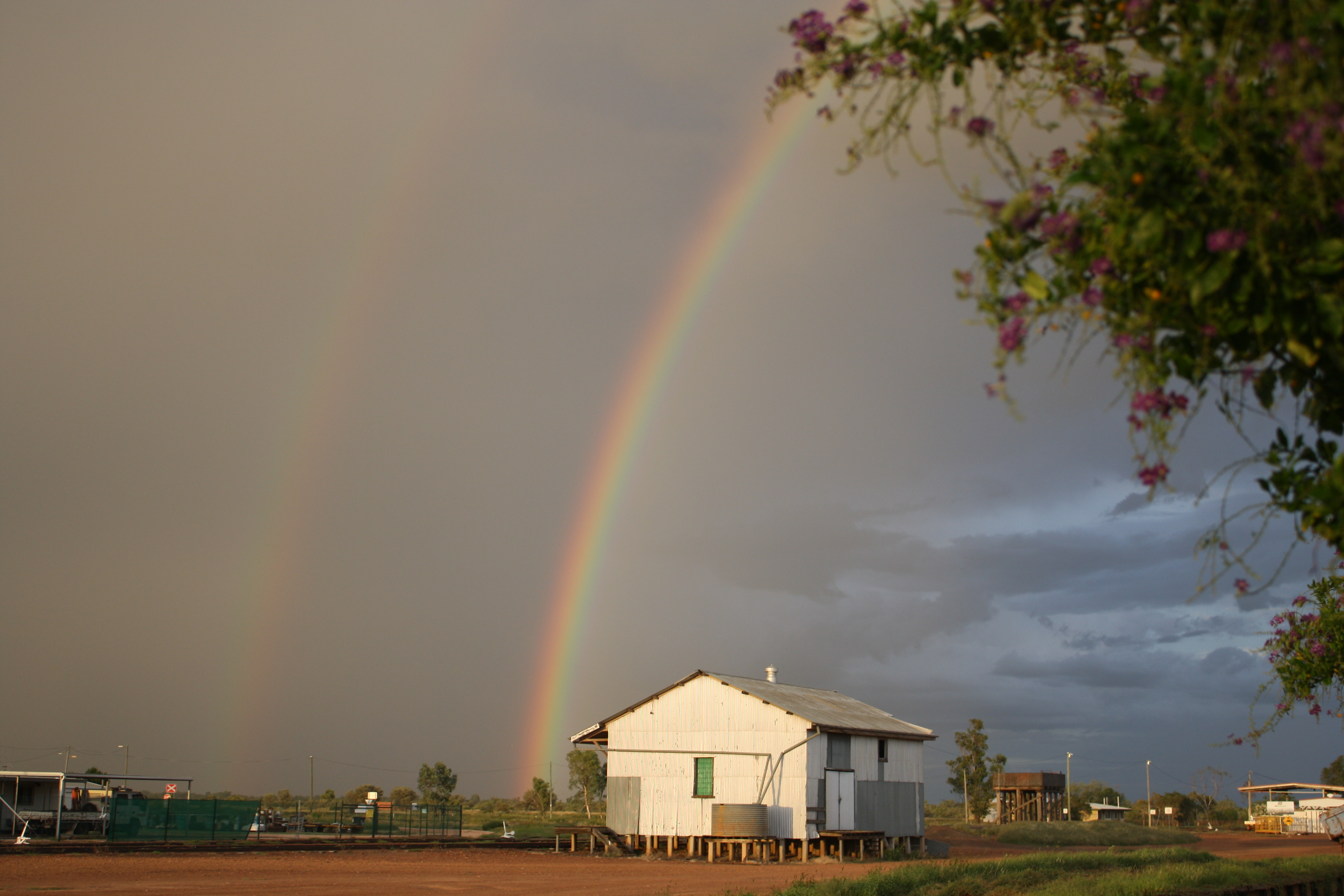
Rainbow over Quilpie - view from behind the Art Gallery

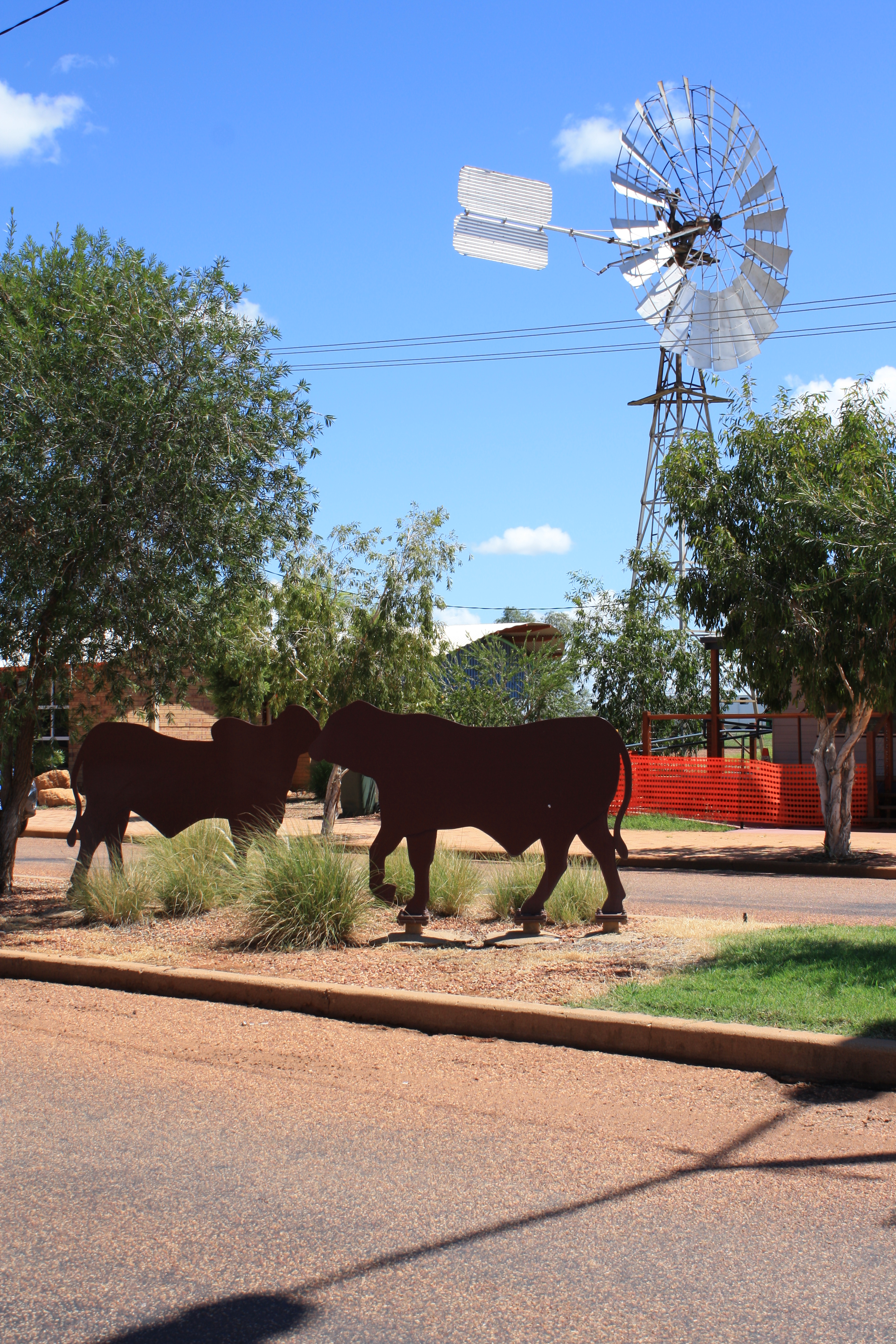
Quilpie public art in the main street

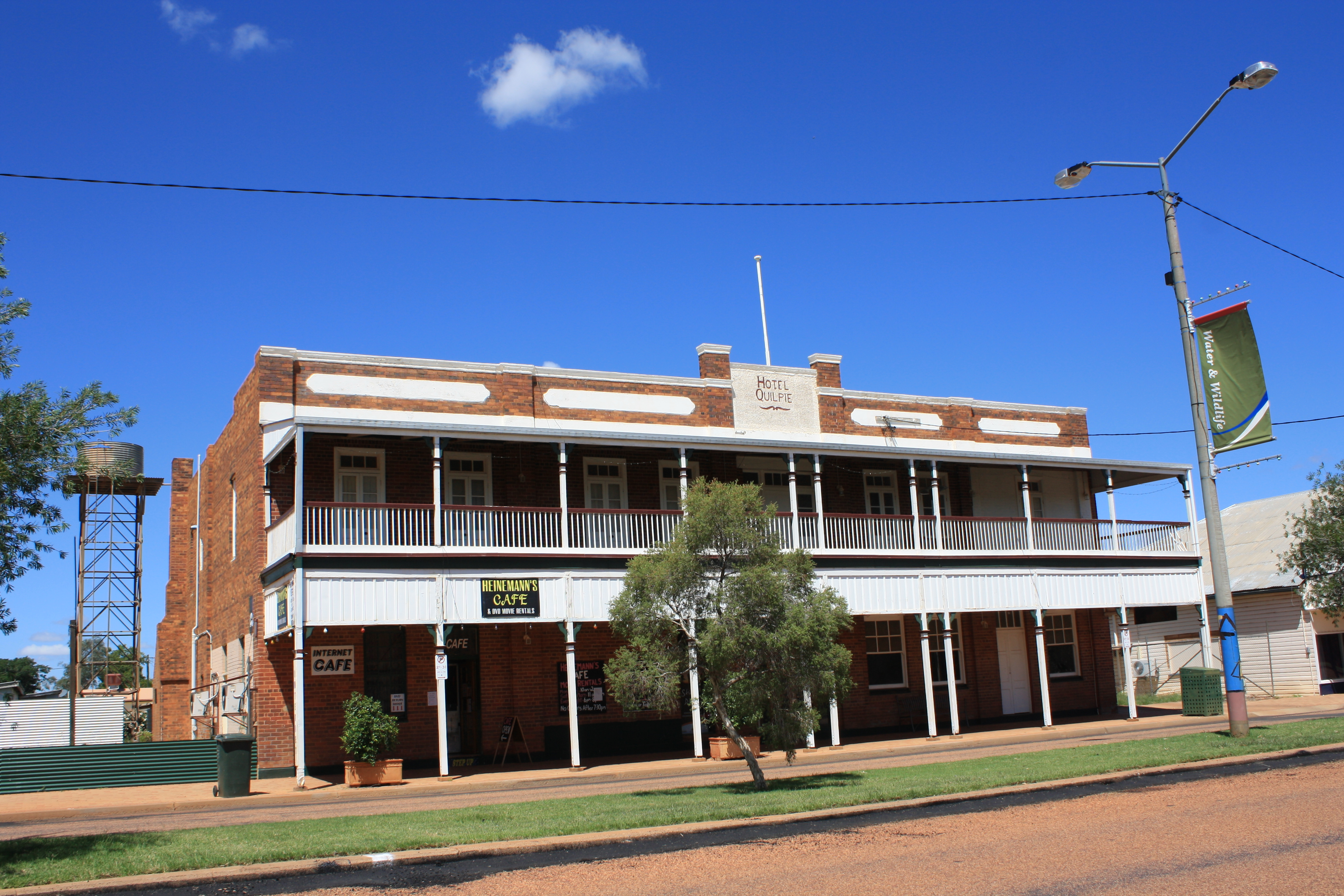
Quilpie Hotel

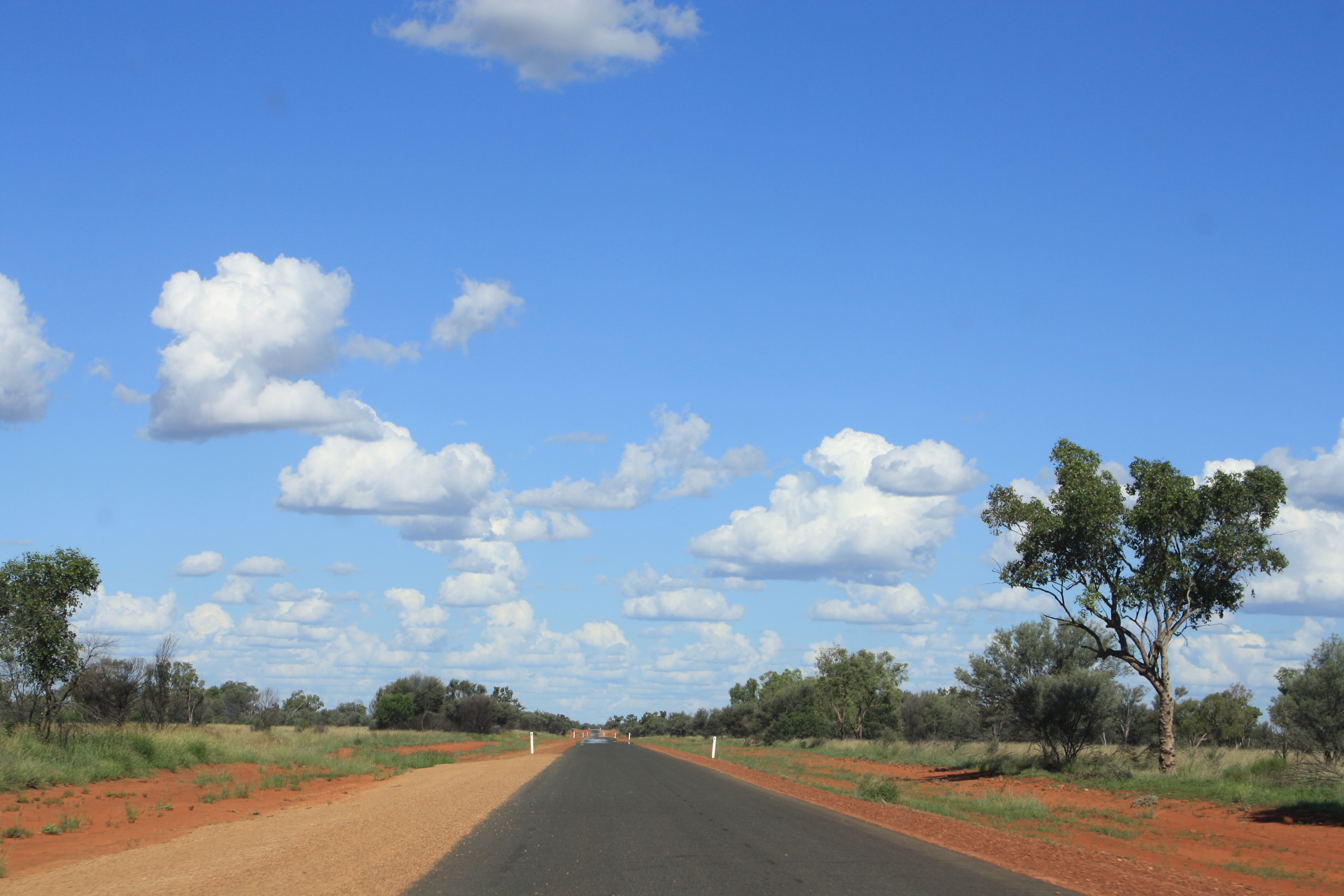
Development Road into Quilpie.

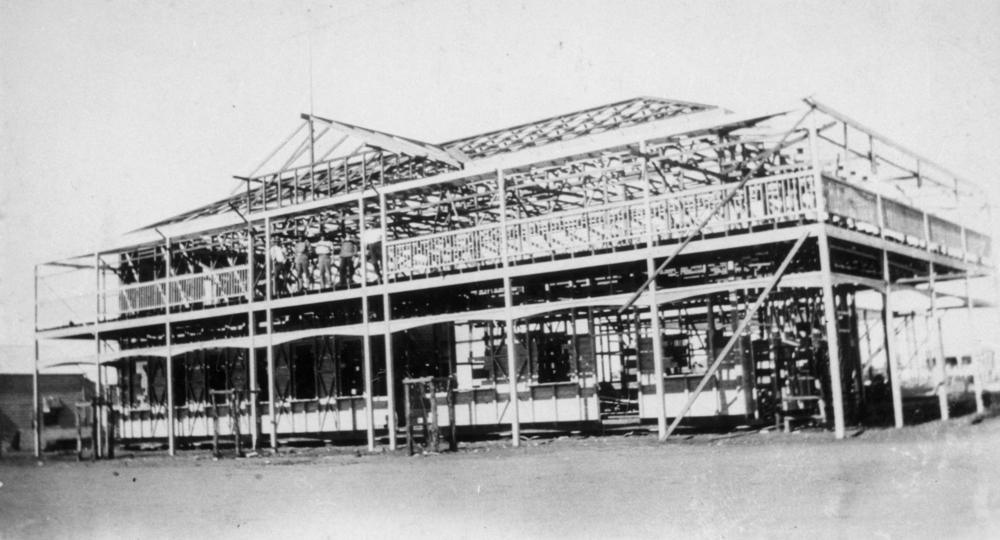
The Imperial Hotel under construction, c.1925

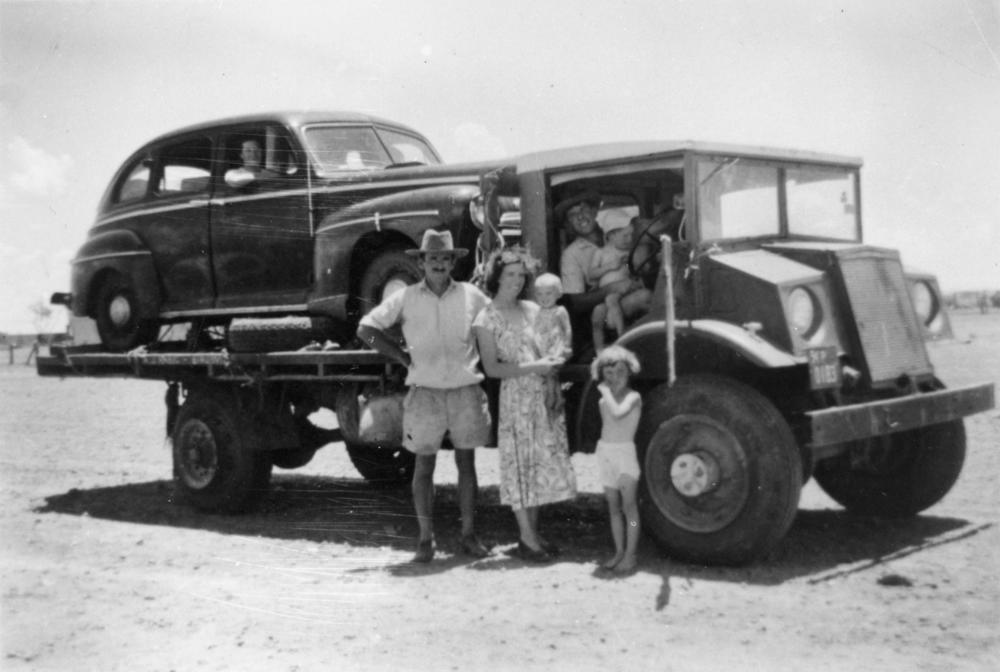
A Brisbane tourist's car being trucked to Quilpie railhead, 1952

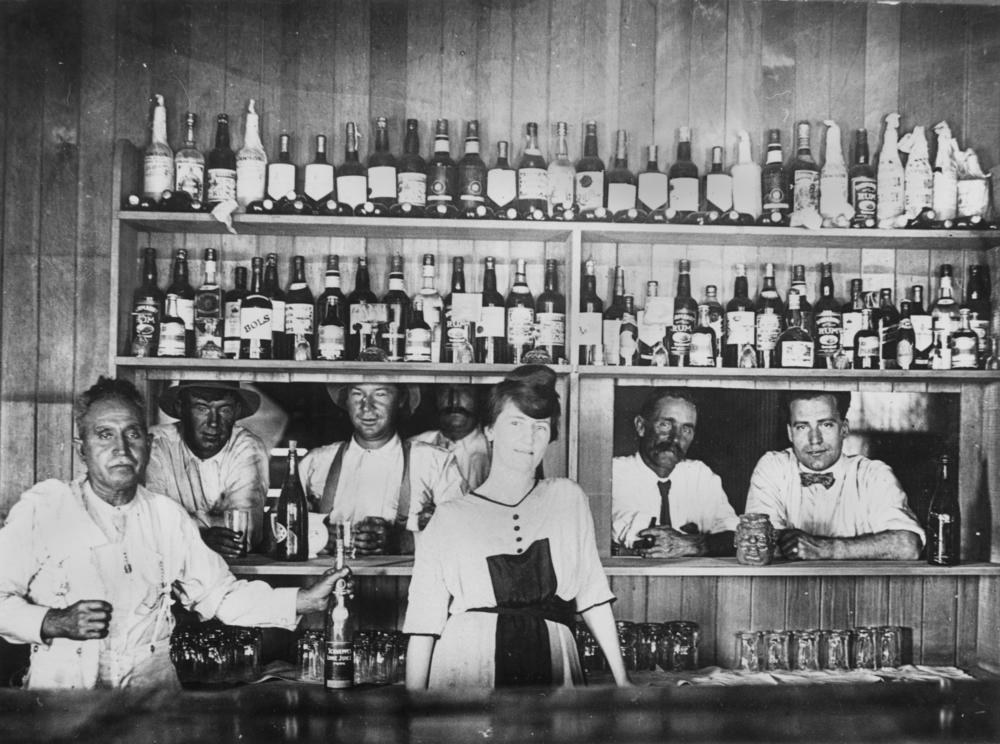
Drinking at the bar of the Quilpie Hotel, c.1921

== See also ==
- Quilpie Airport
