= Goodenia atriplexifolia =

Scientific classification
- Kingdom: Plantae
- Clade: Tracheophytes
- Clade: Angiosperms
- Clade: Eudicots
- Clade: Asterids
- Order: Asterales
- Family: Goodeniaceae
- Genus: Goodenia
- Species: G. atriplexifolia

Binomial name
- Goodenia atriplexifolia A.E.Holland & T.P.Boyle

Species of plant

Goodenia atriplexifolia is a species of flowering plant in the family Goodeniaceae and is endemic to Queensland. It is a woody sub-shrub covered with woolly hairs, with elliptic to egg-shaped leaves with toothed or serrated edges, and leafy spikes of cream-coloured flowers.

== Description ==
Goodenia atriplexifolia is a woody subs-shrub that typically grows to a height of up to 30 cm (12 in) and is densely covered with fine, white, woolly hairs. The leaves are elliptic to egg-shaped, 8–28 mm (0.31–1.10 in) long, 4–14 mm (0.16–0.55 in) wide and sessile with toothed or serrated edges. The flowers are arranged in spikes 200 mm (7.9 in) long with leaf-like bracts at the base of each of up to three flowers. The sepals are triangular, 1.0–1.4 mm (0.039–0.055 in) long, the petals cream-coloured, 7–10 mm (0.28–0.39 in) long, the lower lobes 2–5 mm (0.079–0.197 in) long with wings 0.6–1.2 mm (0.024–0.047 in) wide. Flowering occurs from June to September and the fruit is an elliptic to more or less spherical capsule 4–6 mm (0.16–0.24 in) long and 2–4 mm (0.079–0.157 in) wide.

== Taxonomy and naming ==
Goodenia atriplexifolia was first formally described in 2002 by Ailsa E. Holland and T.P. Boyle in the journal Austrobaileya from specimens collected 150 km (93 mi) south of Longreach in 2001. The specific epithet (atriplexifolia) is a reference to a similarity of the leaves to those in the genus Atriplex.

== Distribution and habitat ==
This goodenia grows in shrubland and woodland with a Triodia understorey between Opalton and the Grey Range in central Queensland.

== Conservation status ==
Goodenia atriplexifolia is classed as "least concern" under the Queensland Government Nature Conservation Act 1992.
