= Cheepie, Queensland =

Cheepie
- Town
- Town map, 1954

- Coordinates: 26.6288°S 145.0136°E
- Country: Australia
- State: Queensland
- LGA: Shire of Quilpie
- Location: 76.3 km (47.4 mi) E of Quilpie; 136 km (85 mi) W of Charleville; 402 km (250 mi) W of Roma; 880 km (550 mi) W of Brisbane

Government
  - State electorate: Warrego
  - Federal division: Maranoa
- Time zone: UTC+10:00 (AEST)
- Postcode: 4475

Cheepie is a town in the locality of Adavale in Shire of Quilpie, Queensland, Australia. It has a population of 2 people.

== History ==
Margany (also known as Marganj, Mardigan, Marukanji, Maranganji) is an Australian Aboriginal language spoken by the Margany people. The Margany language region includes the landscape within the local government boundaries of the Quilpie Shire, taking in Quilpie, Cheepie and Beechal extending towards Eulo and Thargomindah, as well as the properties of Dynevor Downs and Ardoch.

Gunya (also known as Kunya, Kunja, Kurnja) is an Australian Aboriginal language spoken by the Gunya people. The Gunya language region includes the landscape within the local government boundaries of the Paroo Shire Council, taking in Cunnamulla and extending north towards Augathella, east towards Bollon and west towards Thargomindah.

Cheepie was originally a Cobb & Co station.

Cheepie railway station (26.6311°S 145.0136°E) on the Western railway line was built between 1914 and 1916 and was named by Queensland Railways Department, using an Aboriginal word, meaning the call of the whistling duck.

The town takes its name from the Cheepie railway station.

Cheepie became a vibrant local township and in its heyday had a police station, hotel, school, blacksmith, railway station and yards, tent boarding houses, butcher shop, bakery and two market gardens along with numerous residences for people engaged in these operations.

Cheepie Provisional School opened on 14 October 1915 but closed in June 1917. On 9 June 1930, Cheepie Provisional School reopened at a new site. It became Cheepie State School in 1933. It closed on 11 April 1974. The school was on Blakeney Street (26.6297°S 145.0142°E); that land is now leased to the Quilpie Shire Council as a community centre.

The Royal Mail was the first hotel in Cheepie, opening its door in 1926.

In 1932, the Queensland Government offered for auction 50 town lots of 1 rood (11,000 sq ft; 1,000 m^{2}) each in the town.
