= Toompine, Queensland =

Toompine
- Town
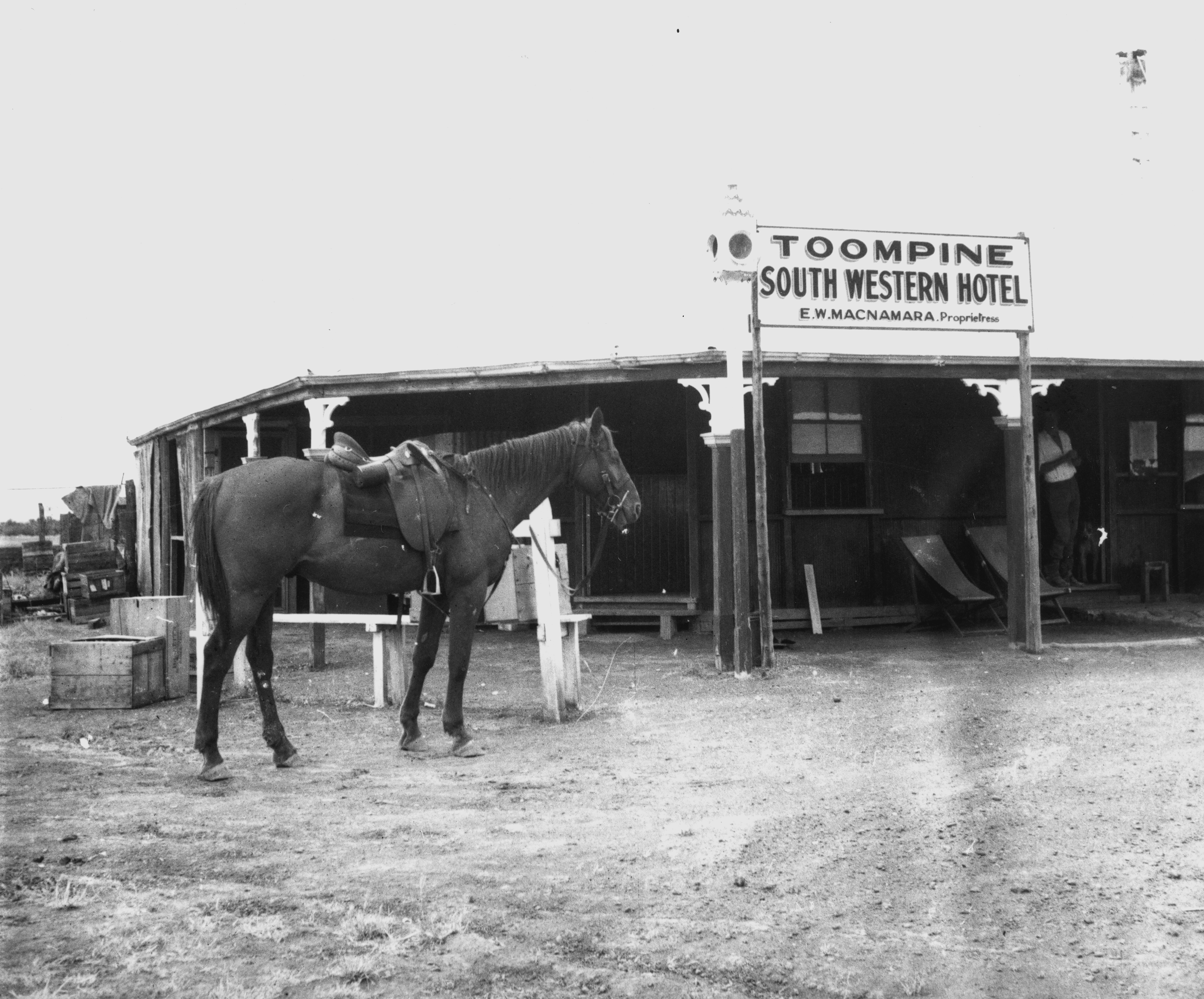
- South Western Hotel at Toompine, circa 1939

- Coordinates: 27.2223°S 144.3673°E
- Country: Australia
- State: Queensland
- LGA: Shire of Quilpie
- Location: 77.4 km (48.1 mi) S of Quilpie; 288 km (179 mi) SW of Charleville; 556 km (345 mi) WSW of Roma; 1,034 km (642 mi) W of Brisbane

Government
  - State electorate: Warrego
  - Federal division: Maranoa
- Time zone: UTC+10:00 (AEST)
- Postcode: 4480

Toompine is a town in the locality of Quilpie in the Shire of Quilpie, Queensland, Australia.

== History ==
The town of Toompine was surveyed in 1870. The name is believed to derive from the Aboriginal name Thaumpine, meaning leech.

Toompine Provisional School opened in 1900. In 1901, it became a half-time school in conjunction with Duck Creek Provisional School (meaning they shared a single teacher between the two schools). The school closed in July 1902.

== Education ==
There are no schools in Toompine nor nearby. Options are distance education and boarding school.

== Amenities ==
The town has a pub, a town hall, a recreation facility, a tennis court and a playground.
