= Shire of Quilpie =

Coordinates: 26°36′36″S 144°15′58″E

- Local government area
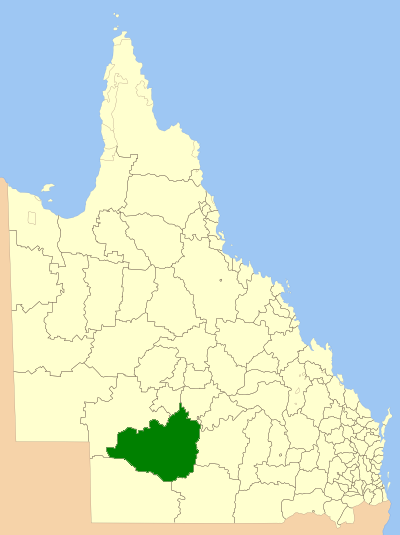
- Location in Queensland

- Interactive map of Shire of Quilpie
- Country: Australia
- State: Queensland
- Established: 1930
- Council seat: Quilpie

Government
  - Mayor: Stuart Mackenzie
  - State electorate: Warrego
  - Federal division: Maranoa

Area
  - Total: 67,415 km^{2} (26,029 sq mi)

Population
  - Total: 698 (2021 census)
  - Density: 0.010354/km^{2} (0.026816/sq mi)
- Website: Shire of Quilpie
LGAs around Shire of Quilpie
Barcoo	Longreach	Blackall-Tambo
Barcoo	Shire of Quilpie	Murweh
Bulloo	Bulloo	Paroo

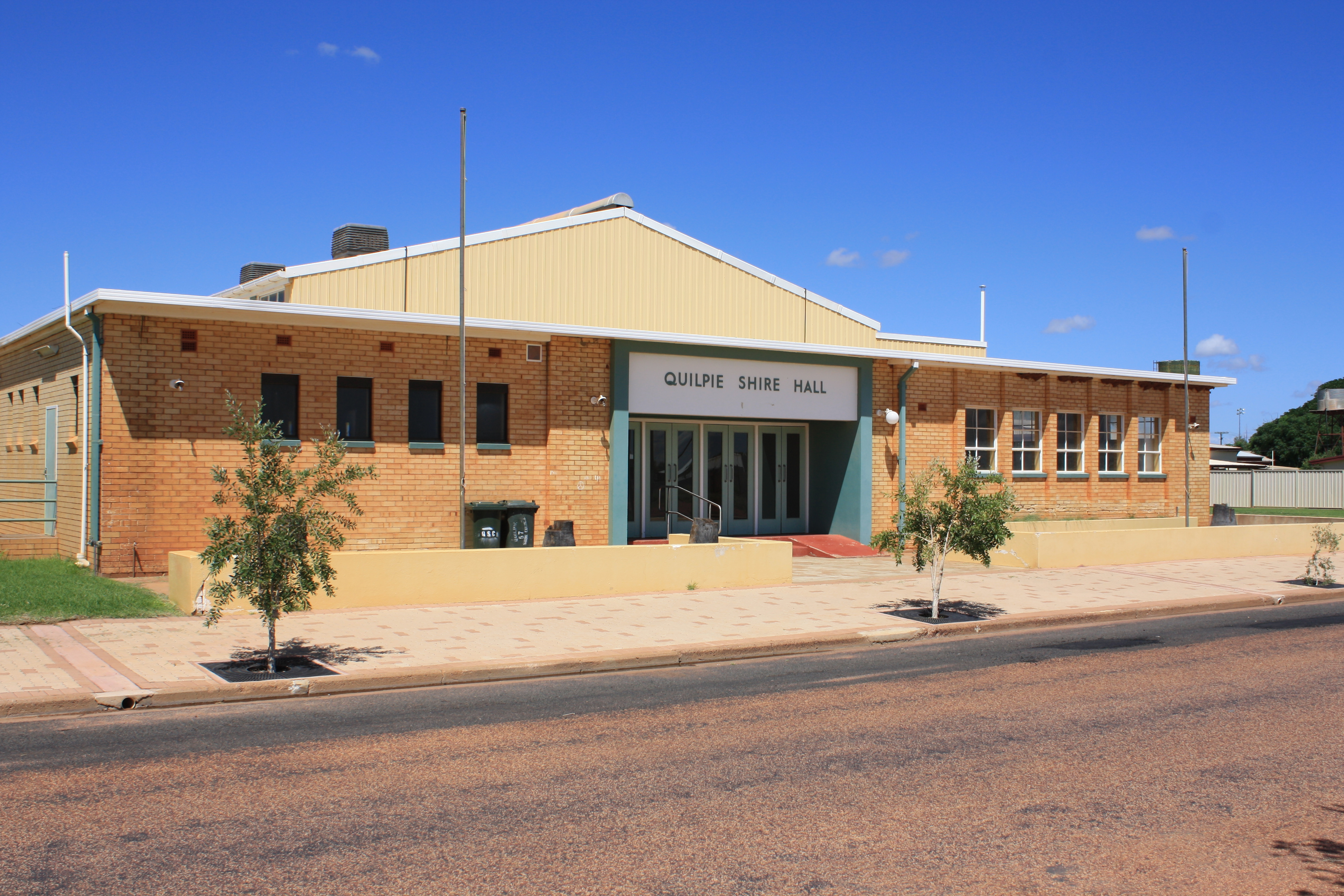
Quilpie Shire Hall, 2012

The Shire of Quilpie is a local government area in South West Queensland, Australia. It covers an area of 67,415 square kilometres (26,029 sq mi), and its administrative centre is the town of Quilpie.

The dominant industry is grazing. Opal fields are also worked within the shire.

In the 2021 census, the Shire of Quilpie had a population of 698 people.

== History ==
Margany (also known as Marganj, Mardigan, Marukanji, Maranganji) is an Australian Aboriginal language spoken by the Margany people. The Margany language region includes the landscape within the local government boundaries of the Quilpie Shire, taking in Quilpie, Cheepie and Beechal extending towards Eulo and Thargomindah, as well as the properties of Dynevor Downs and Ardoch.

The Shire was created on 17 July 1930 from parts of the Shires of Barcoo, Murweh and Paroo and part of the abolished Shire of Adavale and all of the abolished Shire of Bulloo. However, on 4 July 1931, the Shire of Bulloo was re-instated.

== Chairmen and mayors ==
=== Chairmen ===
- 1930–1933 H. J. Pegler

=== Mayors ===
- 1997–2012: P. David Edwards
- 2012–present: Stuart Alexander Mackenzie

== Towns and localities ==
The Shire of Quilpie includes the following settlements:

- Quilpie
- Adavale
- Cheepie
- Eromanga
- Toompine

== Amenities ==
Quilpie Shire Council operates a public library at Quilpie.

== Demographics ==
Year	Population	Notes
1933	1,965	
1947	1,931	
1954	2,387	
1961	2,534	
1966	2,051	
1971	1,685	
1976	1,440	
1981	1,430	
1986	1,490	
1991	1,406	
1996	1,402	
2001 census	986	
2006 census	986	
2011 census	976	
2016 census	813	
2021 census	698	

== Notable people from Quilpie ==
- Vaughan Johnson, Queensland state politician
- Ewen Jones, Australian federal politician
- Professor Don Markwell, social scientist and educational leader
- Sandy McPhie, former Queensland state politician
- Justine Saunders, late Australian actor
