= Pimelea elongata =

Scientific classification
- Kingdom: Plantae
- Clade: Tracheophytes
- Clade: Angiosperms
- Clade: Eudicots
- Clade: Rosids
- Order: Malvales
- Family: Thymelaeaceae
- Genus: Pimelea
- Species: P. elongata

Binomial name
- Pimelea elongata Threlfall

Species of shrub

Pimelea elongata is a species of flowering plant in the family Thymelaeaceae and is endemic to inland areas of eastern Australia. It is a slender forb with linear to narrowly elliptic leaves and spikes of hairy, yellowish-green flowers.

== Description ==
Pimelea elongata is a slender forb that typically grows to a height of 15–40 cm (5.9–15.7 in) and has a woody base. Its leaves are linear to narrowly elliptic, usually glabrous, 7–15 mm (0.28–0.59 in) long and 1.4–2.8 mm (0.055–0.110 in) wide on a petiole 0.5–0.6 mm (0.020–0.024 in) long. The flowers are borne in spikes on the ends of branches on a peduncle up to 8 mm (0.31 in) long. Ech spike has 17 to 42 flowers on a rachis 18–100 mm (0.71–3.94 in) long, each flower on a pedicel 0.5–0.9 mm (0.020–0.035 in) long and lack bracts. The floral tube is 2.5–3 mm (0.098–0.118 in) long, the sepals 0.5–0.8 mm (0.020–0.031 in) long, glabrous on the inside and moderately hairy outside. Flowering occurs in most months and the fruit is green.

== Taxonomy ==
Pimelea elongata was first formally described in 1980 by S. Threlfall in the journal Telopea from specimens collected near Cheepie in 1970.

== Distribution and habitat ==
This pimelea grows in heavy-textured soils with a thin, sandy upper layer and is found in northern new South Wales, east of Charleville in south-eastern Queensland and in the northern Flinders Ranges in South Australia. It is poisonous to livestock.

== Conservation status ==
This species is listed as "endangered" in New South Wales under the Biodiversity Conservation Act 2016.
