= Hakea maconochieana =

Scientific classification
- Kingdom: Plantae
- Clade: Tracheophytes
- Clade: Angiosperms
- Clade: Eudicots
- Order: Proteales
- Family: Proteaceae
- Genus: Hakea
- Species: H. maconochieana

Binomial name
- Hakea maconochieana Haegi
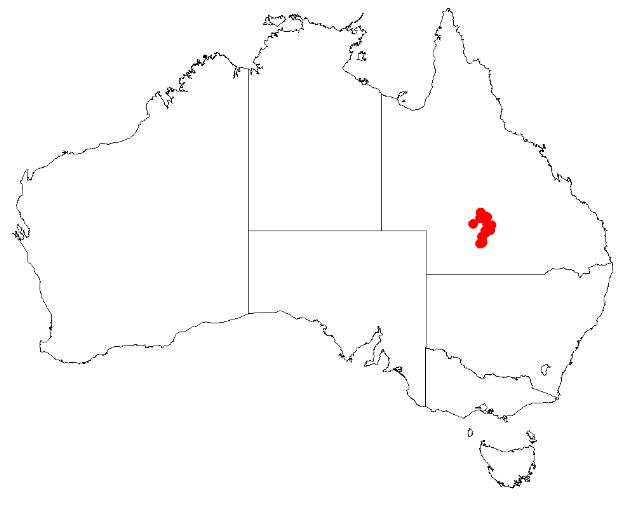
- Occurrence data from AVH

Species of shrub endemic to Queensland, Australia

Hakea maconochieana is a shrub in the family Proteaceae and is endemic to Queensland, Australia. It is a rare species with red flowers, needle-like leaves and an upright or spreading shrub.

== Description ==
Hakea maconochieana is an upright or spreading shrub typically growing to a height of 0.5 to 1.5 metres (2 to 5 ft) and does not form a lignotuber. The leaves are flat, thick, 7 to 13.5 centimetres (3 to 5 in) long, 1.5 to 2.7 centimetres (0.6 to 1.1 in) wide, patchily covered with flattened soft hairs, prominent veins, finely ribbed and ending with a more or less blunt tip. The branchlets at flowering are sparsely covered with flattened silky hairs. The inflorescence consists of about 100 red flowers on a stem 3–3.5 cm (1.2–1.4 in) long with rough, coarse longish hairs. The pedicel has few or moderately covered with soft hairs. The red perianth has occasional flattened, silky hairs and the pistil is 15–18 mm (0.59–0.71 in) long. Flowering occurs may occur from April to August with the main flush in September. The fruit are scarcely woody, obliquely narrowly egg-shaped to elliptic, 1.4–1.7 cm (0.55–0.67 in) long, 0.6–0.7 cm (0.24–0.28 in) wide, slightly curved on an elongated rachis.

== Taxonomy and naming ==
The species was first formally described by the botanist Laurence Haegi in 1999 as part of the work Appendix: Hakea written by Haegi, W.R.Barker, R.M.Barker, and A.J.Wilson as published in Flora of Australia. The specific epithet honours John Maconochie who was the botanist in charge of the Alice Springs Herbarium from 1967 to 1984 who had a keen interest in Hakeas.

== Distribution and habitat ==
It is endemic to several isolated areas in far South West region of Queensland. It was originally known from scattered localities in the Ambathala Range in the Mariala National Park near Adavale. It generally grows in stony clay soil in scattered open Acacia stowardii communities.

== Conservation status ==
Hakea maconochieana is classified as vulnerable under Queensland's Nature Conservation (Wildlife) Regulation 2006.
