= Shire of Adavale =

Local government area of Queensland, Australia

Coordinates: 25.6°S 144.7°E

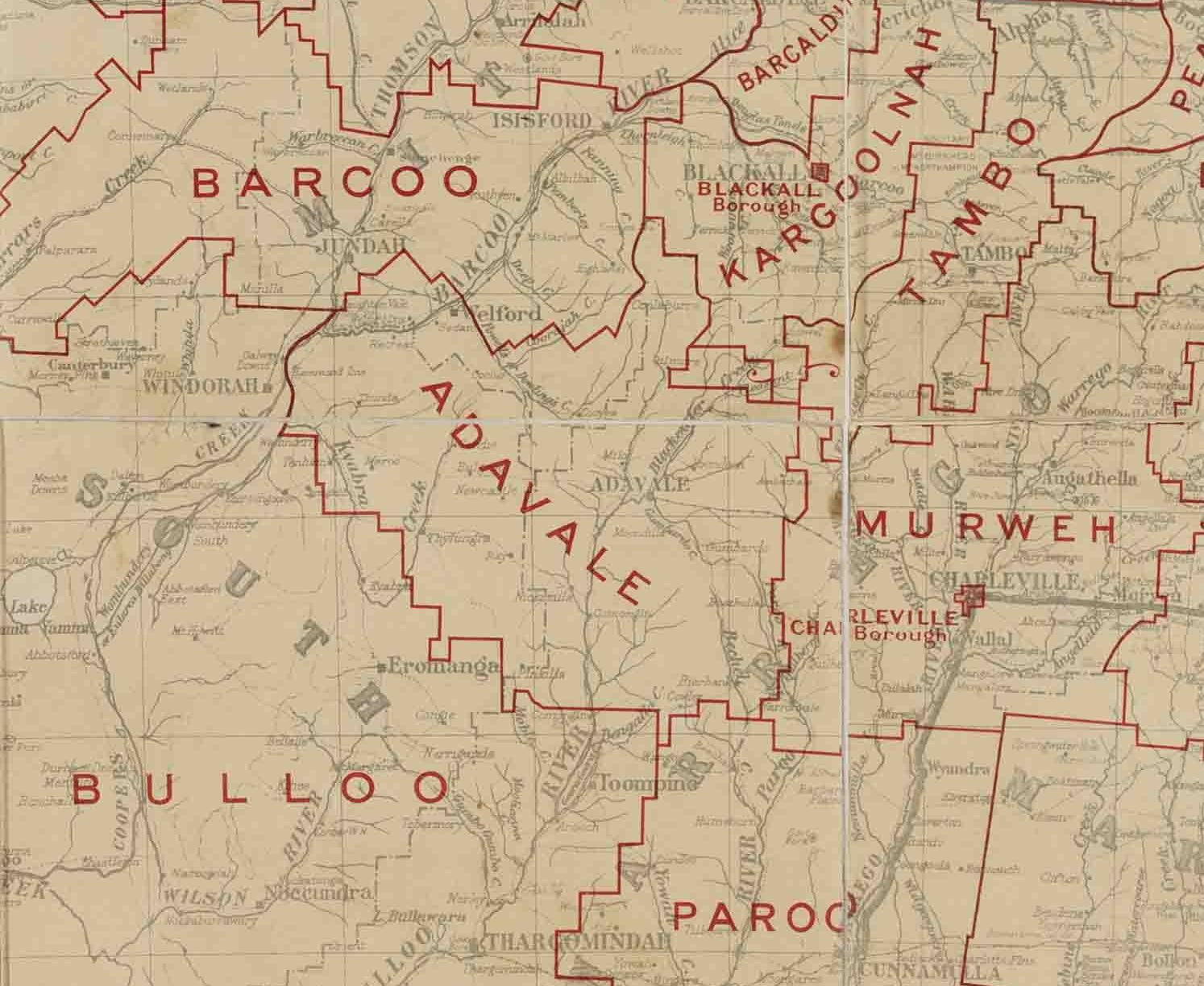
Map of Adavale Division and adjacent local government areas, March 1902

The Shire of Adavale is a former local government area in the south-east of Queensland, Australia, centred on the town of Adavale. It existed from 1879 to 1930.

== History ==
On 11 November 1879, the Murweh Division was created as one of 74 divisions within Queensland under the Divisional Boards Act 1879. On 5 February 1889, the western part of Murweh Division was separated to create the new Adavale Division.

The Adavale Divisional Board met for the first time on 26 May 1889 and Mr E. B. Learmouth was appointed chairman.

The divisional board hall and offices were constructed in Adavale in 1889.

With the passage of the Local Authorities Act 1902, the Adavale Division became the Shire of Adavale on 31 March 1903.

On 17 July 1930, the shire was abolished, and its region split between the new Shire of Quilpie, the Shire of Murweh, the Shire of Isisford and the Shire of Barcoo.

== Chairmen ==
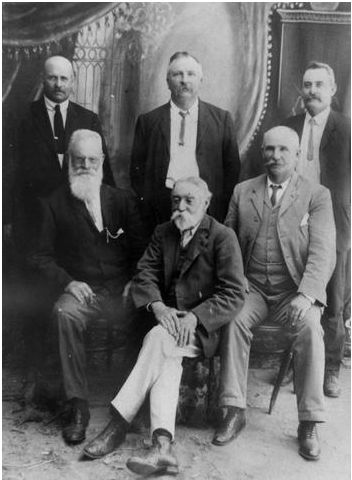
Members of the Adavale Shire Council, 1909. Members from left to right, back row: Albert Jones of 'Gumbardo'; Donald MacNeill, Divisional Board Clerk; Harry Charles Pegler. Front row, left to right: Alfred Skinner, storekeeper in Adavale; Iver Ian McIver, 'Bulgroo' station manager; James Paynter, 'Ambathalla' station. (Description supplied with photograph)

- 1888 A. B. Learmouth
- 1899 Augustus Henry Pegler
- 1927: William Hazlett

== Population ==
The population of the shire was:

Year	Population
1889	520
1890	560
1891	947
1892	560
1893	560
1894	520
1895	500
1896	550
1897	500
1898	520
1899	550
1900	500
1901	950
1902	550
1903	575
1904	570
1905	570
1906	590
1907	650
1908	670
1909	730
1910	760
1911	1,358
1912	1,358
1913	1,358
1914	1,358
1915	1,760
1916	1,900
1917	1,540
1918	1,540
1919	1,912
1920	1,429
1921	1,429
1922	1,429
1923	1,500
1924	1,497
1925	1,520
1926	1,760
1927	1,760
1928	2,227
1929	2,130
1930	2,000
