= Acacia spania =

Western rosewood

Scientific classification
- Kingdom: Plantae
- Clade: Tracheophytes
- Clade: Angiosperms
- Clade: Eudicots
- Clade: Rosids
- Order: Fabales
- Family: Fabaceae
- Subfamily: Caesalpinioideae
- Clade: Mimosoid clade
- Genus: Acacia
- Species: A. spania

Binomial name
- Acacia spania Pedley
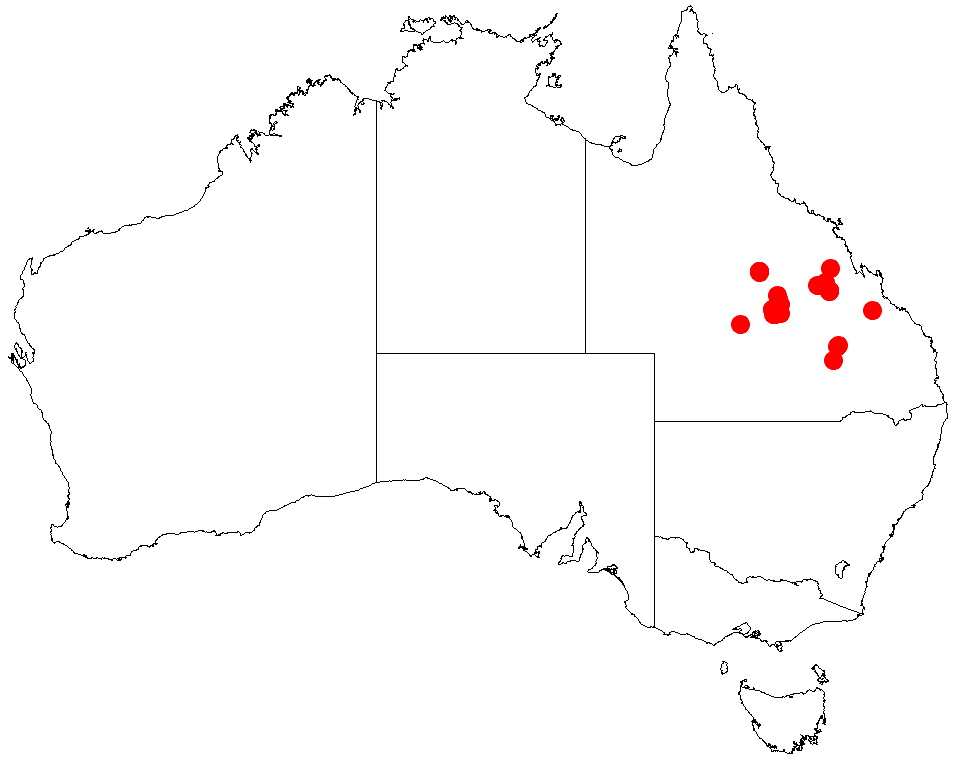
- Occurrence data from AVH

Species of legume

Acacia spania, also known as western rosewood, is a tree belonging to the genus Acacia and the subgenus Juliflorae that is endemic to north eastern Australia.

== Description ==
The single stemmed tree that can grow to a height of around 15 metres (49 ft) and has iron type style bark. The glabrous and angular branchlets have a light brown colour and are usually scurfy. Like most species of Acacia it has phyllodes rather than true leaves. The glabrous and evergreen phyllodes have a narrowly elliptic to elliptic shape and are flat and straight to slightly curved. The phyllodes have a length of 2 to 4.5 cm (0.79 to 1.77 in) and a width of 6 to 18 mm (0.24 to 0.71 in). The grey green to blue-green are quite stiff phyllodes and have three to five main longitudinal nerves. It blooms between August and September producing cylindrical flower-spikes that are 2 to 5 cm (0.79 to 1.97 in) in length containing bright yellow to lemon yellow coloured flowers.

== Distribution ==
It is found in a small area of inland east-central Queensland mostly from a couple of localities around Emerald where it is situated in red soils often present as dense stands as a part of woodland communities where it is often associated with species of Eucalyptus and other species of Acacia. The tree is usually found among rocky sandstone ridges and on hills in sandy to loamy soils at altitudes of 400 to 600 m (1,300 to 2,000 ft) over an area of around approximately 205,000 km^{2} (79,000 sq mi) from north of Aramac to about Roma in the south.

== See also ==
- List of Acacia species
