= Adavale =

- Town
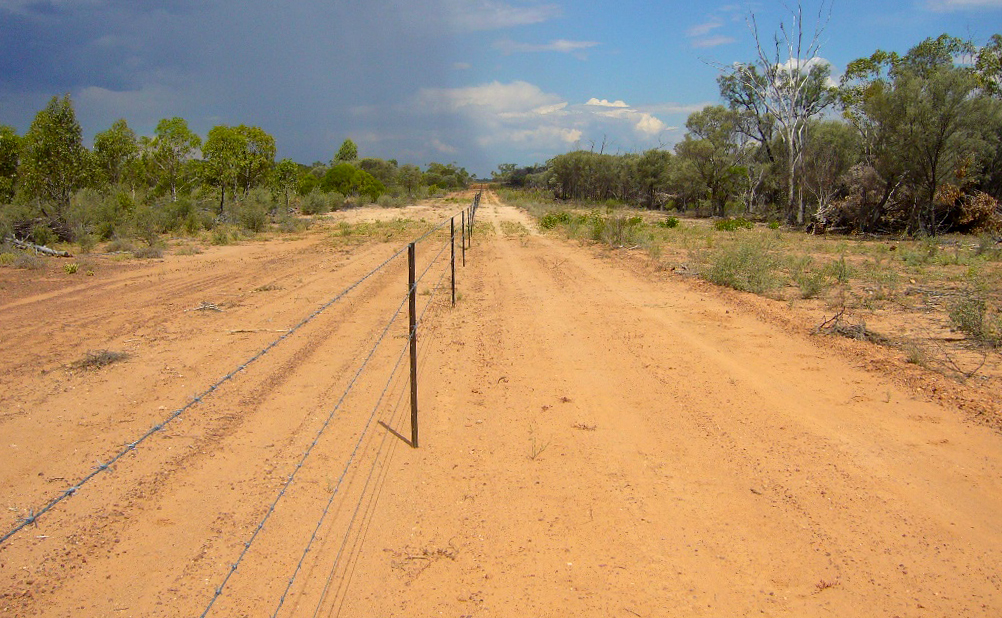
- Fencing at Yapunyah in Adavale, 2012

- Interactive map of Adavale
- Coordinates: 25.9108°S 144.6005°E
- Country: Australia
- State: Queensland
- LGA: Shire of Quilpie
- Location: 98.3 km (61.1 mi) NNE of Quilpie; 187 km (116 mi) WNW of Charleville; 454 km (282 mi) WNW of Roma; 932 km (579 mi) WNW of Brisbane
- Established: 1880

Government
  - State electorate: Warrego
  - Federal division: Maranoa

Area
  - Total: 21,356.4 km^{2} (8,245.8 sq mi)
- Elevation: 229 m (751 ft)

Population
  - Total: 72 (2021 census)
  - Density: 0.003371/km^{2} (0.00873/sq mi)
- Time zone: UTC+10:00 (AEST)
- Postcode: 4474
- Mean max temp: 29.1 °C (84.4 °F)
- Mean min temp: 14.4 °C (57.9 °F)
- Annual rainfall: 391.8 mm (15.43 in)
Localities around Adavale
Jundah	Isisford	Blackall
Eromanga	Adavale	Lango; Cooladdi
Quilpie	Quilpie	Humeburn

Adavale is a rural town and locality in the Shire of Quilpie, Queensland, Australia. In the 2021 census, the locality of Adavale had a population of 72 people.

== Geography ==
Adavale is in South West Queensland, 931 kilometres (578 mi) west of the state capital, Brisbane. It is roughly in the centre of the locality.

Between Adavale and Yaraka is Yapunyah waterhole.

The town is only accessible along a gravel road from Charleville in the east, Quilpie in the south and Blackall in the north.

Adavale has the following mountains:

- Cave Hill (25.3920°S 145.1459°E) 399 metres (1,309 ft)
- Mount Bullock (24.6652°S 144.6740°E) 424 metres (1,391 ft)
- Mount Prara (26.8620°S 145.2231°E) 313 metres (1,027 ft)
- Winbin Hill (26.6187°S 144.8205°E) 302 metres (991 ft)

There are a number of protected areas within the locality:

- part of Idalia National Park in the north of the locality
- Hell Hole Gorge National Park in the west of the locality
- Mariala National Park in the east of the locality

== Climate ==
Adavale has a subtropical semi-arid climate (Köppen: BSh). The settlement experiences very hot, somewhat wetter summers and mild, dry winters. There are 163.3 clear days clear days and only 68.7 cloudy days per annum.

Climate data for Adavale (25.92°S 144.60°E, 229 m (751 ft) m AMSL) (1889-1985 data)
Month	Jan	Feb	Mar	Apr	May	Jun	Jul	Aug	Sep	Oct	Nov	Dec	Year
Record high °C (°F)	46.0 (114.8)	42.8 (109.0)	40.0 (104.0)	37.8 (100.0)	34.4 (93.9)	32.8 (91.0)	30.0 (86.0)	32.2 (90.0)	37.0 (98.6)	40.0 (104.0)	44.4 (111.9)	46.0 (114.8)	46.0 (114.8)
Mean daily maximum °C (°F)	36.2 (97.2)	34.8 (94.6)	33.0 (91.4)	28.9 (84.0)	24.1 (75.4)	20.8 (69.4)	20.4 (68.7)	22.7 (72.9)	26.8 (80.2)	30.9 (87.6)	34.5 (94.1)	36.5 (97.7)	29.1 (84.4)
Mean daily minimum °C (°F)	22.3 (72.1)	22.0 (71.6)	20.0 (68.0)	14.8 (58.6)	10.2 (50.4)	6.6 (43.9)	5.1 (41.2)	6.9 (44.4)	10.6 (51.1)	15.2 (59.4)	18.3 (64.9)	21.0 (69.8)	14.4 (57.9)
Record low °C (°F)	13.9 (57.0)	13.3 (55.9)	10.0 (50.0)	5.6 (42.1)	−1.7 (28.9)	−2.2 (28.0)	−4.3 (24.3)	−1.1 (30.0)	2.0 (35.6)	2.0 (35.6)	6.0 (42.8)	8.9 (48.0)	−4.3 (24.3)
Average precipitation mm (inches)	62.7 (2.47)	58.8 (2.31)	49.6 (1.95)	24.0 (0.94)	28.5 (1.12)	24.8 (0.98)	21.6 (0.85)	13.7 (0.54)	15.5 (0.61)	25.4 (1.00)	26.5 (1.04)	40.5 (1.59)	391.8 (15.43)
Average precipitation days (≥ 1.0 mm)	4.1	3.6	3.3	1.8	2.0	2.2	1.9	1.5	1.6	2.7	2.7	3.5	30.9
Average afternoon relative humidity (%)	26	33	32	32	35	38	35	27	24	24	19	21	29
Source: Bureau of Meteorology (1889-1985 data)

== History ==
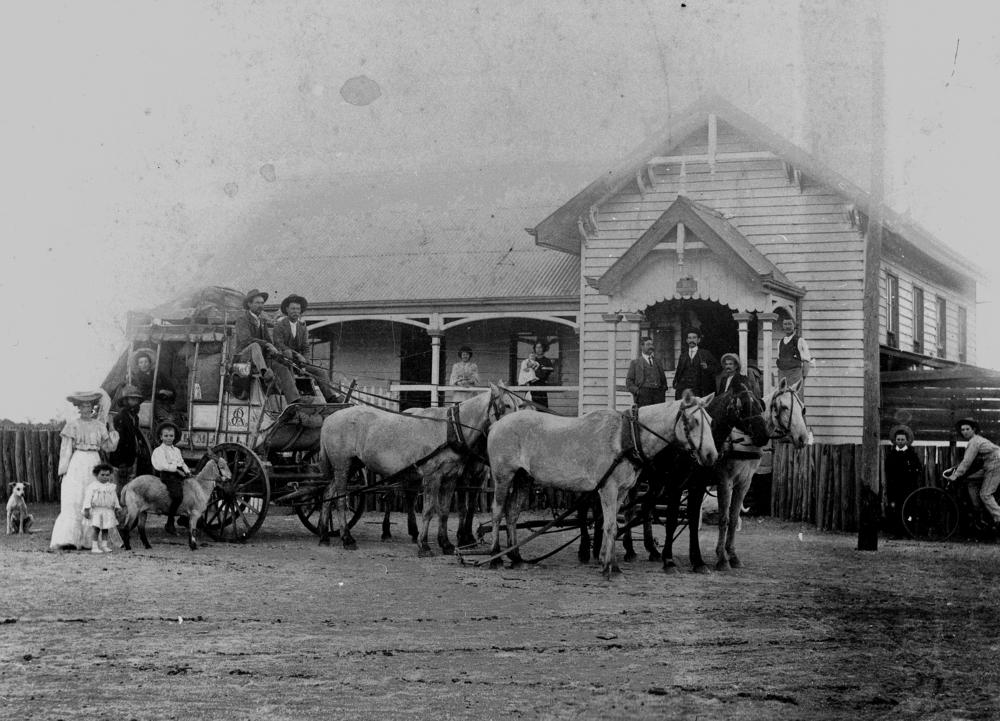
Stagecoach outside Adavale Post Office, 1907

The town is named after Ada Constance Stevens (wife of Ernest James Stevens). The Stevens family had the Tintinchilla (later Milo) pastoral run in the area. There is a story that the origin of the name is that Ada lost her hat veil (Ada-veil) where the Milo road crosses Blackwater Creek.

Town and suburban lots in the town of Adavale were sold on 9 February 1881 at Charleville.

Adavale Post Office opened on 1 January 1881 and closed in 1991.

Milo Station Provisional School opened circa 1888 and closed circa 1891. It reopened as Milo Provision School circa 1902 and closed circa 1905.

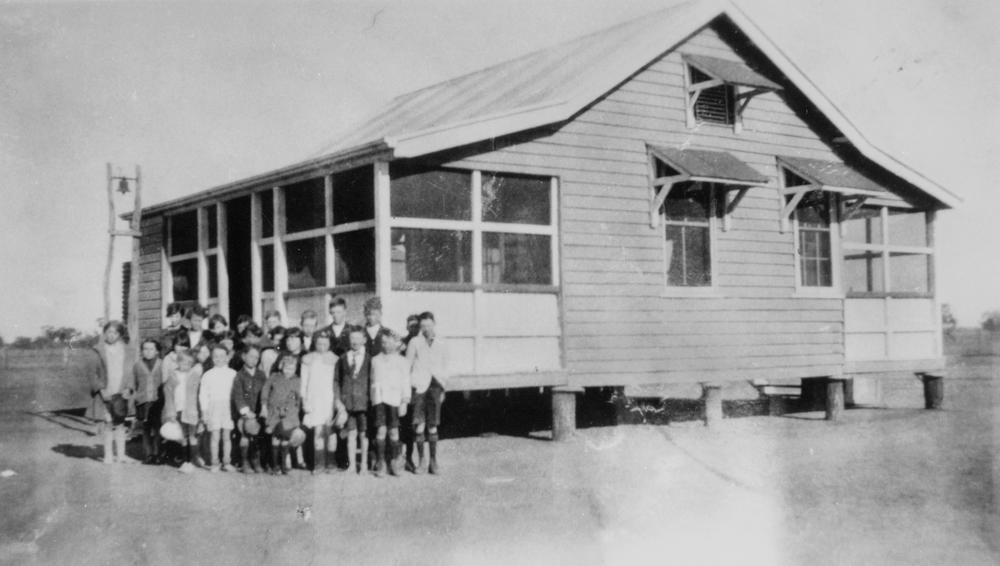
Pupils at Adavale State School, circa 1928

Adavale Provisional School opened on 8 October 1888. On 1 January 1909, it became Adavale State School. It closed on 31 December 1968. The school was on Nelson Street (25.9063°S 144.5985°E).

From 1889 to 1930, Adavale was the seat of local government, initially called Adavale Division and later the Shire of Adavale. The town was a thriving centre but, in 1917, the Western railway line did not come to the town as expected but passed further to the south where the new town of Quilpie was created along the railway line, and soon became the major town in the region while Adavale diminished. In 1930, it was decided that the seat of local government should move from Adavale to Quilpie and the Shire of Adavale was renamed the Shire of Quilpie.

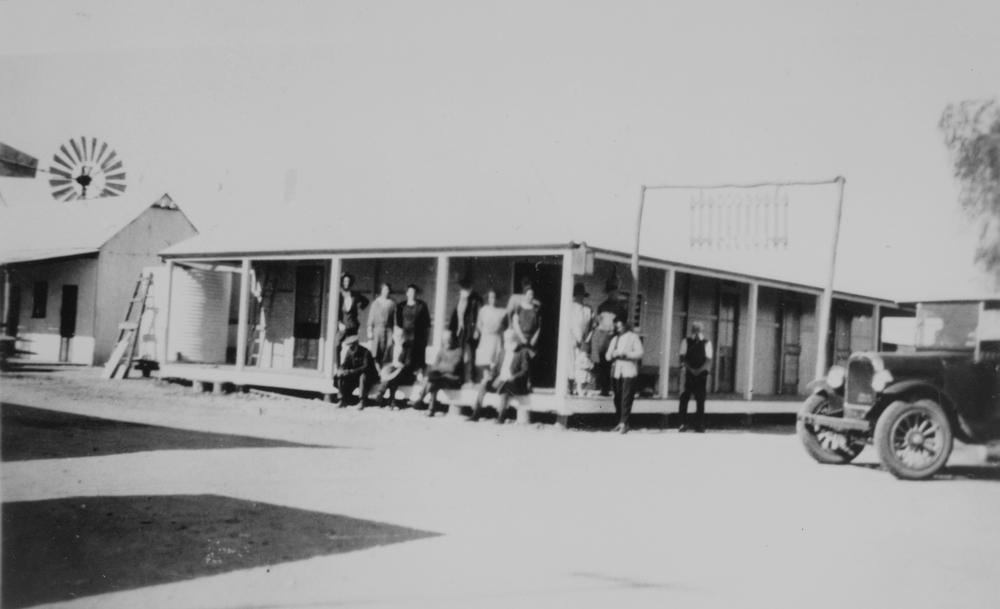
Patrons of the Green Gate Hotel on the verandah, Adavale, 1928

St Eugene Catholic Church was opened on Wednesday 5 May 1954 by Bishop William Brennan. The church was originally located on the corner of Skinner and Shepherd Streets. In 1963, it was badly damaged in a flood. It was demolished and rebuilt at that site in 1964. It was later relocated to McKinlay Street (25.90597°S 144.6009°E). The church has closed and the building has been sold.

On March 27 2025 flooding inundated the town with residents climbing on to their roofs awaiting evacuation by helicopter to Quilpie.

== Demographics ==
In the 2006 census, Adavale and the surrounding area had a population of 141, with the town itself having an estimated population of around 15.

In the 2016 census, the locality of Adavale had a population of 93 people.

In the 2021 census, the locality of Adavale had a population of 72 people.

== Education ==
There are no schools in Adavale nor nearby; the nearest government schools are in Quilpie. However, given the distance, the alternatives are distance education and boarding schools.

== Facilities ==
Adavale Cemetery is on Patricia Downs Road north of the town (25.8992°S 144.6081°E).

Adavale Police Station is in Shepherd Street (25.9108°S 144.5979°E).

Adavale SES Facility is on the eastern corner of Mckinlay Street and Blackwater Street (25.9067°S 144.6009°E).

== Attractions ==
Emmet Pocket Lookout is in the Idalia National Park and offers panoramic views over the park's northern boundaries to the surrounding plains (24.7218°S 144.6574°E).
