= Grey Range =

Hill range in Australia

Coordinates: 27.04422°S 143.45039°E

The Grey Range is a low-lying range of hills in the Australian states of Queensland and New South Wales. The range extends from the west of Blackall of Central West Queensland in the north to Tibooburra in the far west of New South Wales in the south.

The range's highest point, Mount Arrowsmith, reaches 2,000 ft (610 m) above sea level.

The Yapunyah waterhole is a notable feature of the range.

Yaraka is located near the range.

== History ==
Kuungkari (also known as Kungkari and Koonkerri) is a language of Western Queensland. The Kuungkari language region includes the landscape within the local government boundaries of Longreach Shire Council and Blackall-Tambo Shire Council.

== See also ==
- List of mountains in Australia
