= Maranganji =

Aboriginal Australian tribe

The Maranganji (also called Margany and Mardigan) are an Aboriginal Australian tribe from southwest Queensland.

== Country ==
Norman Tindale's estimated Maranganji tribal land to be 810 square miles (2,100 km^{2}).

== Alternative names ==
- Marganj
- Marnganj
- Marukanji
- Murgoan
- Murgoin
- Murngain

Mardigan Source: Tindale 1974, p. 181

== Sources ==
- Mathews, R. H. (1898). "Divisions of Queensland aborigines". Proceedings of the American Philosophical Society. 37: 327–336.
- Myles, F.W. (1886). "Thargominda, Bulloo River" (PDF). In Curr, Edward Micklethwaite (ed.). The Australian race: its origin, languages, customs, place of landing in Australia and the routes by which it spread itself over the continent. Vol. 2. Melbourne: J. Ferres. pp. 36–41.
- Tindale, Norman Barnett (1974). "Maranganji (QLD)". Aboriginal Tribes of Australia: Their Terrain, Environmental Controls, Distribution, Limits, and Proper Names. Australian National University Press.
