= Numalla County, Queensland =

Administrative division of Queensland, Australia

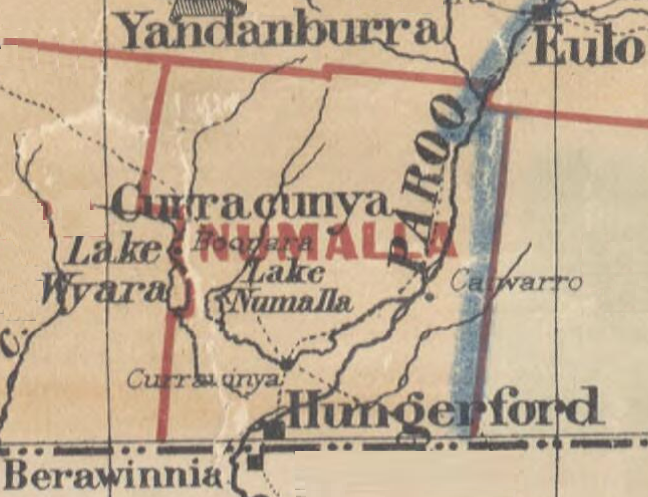
Numalla County Queensland

Numalla County is a cadastral division of Queensland and a county of the Warrego Land District of southwestern Queensland.

The county came into existence in the 19th century, but on 8 March 1901, when the Governor of Queensland issued a proclamation legally dividing Queensland into counties under the Land Act 1897.

Like all counties in Queensland, it is a non-functional administrative unit, that is used mainly for the purpose of registering land titles. From 30 November 2015, the government no longer referenced counties and parishes in land information systems however the Museum of Lands, Mapping and Surveying retains a record for historical purposes.

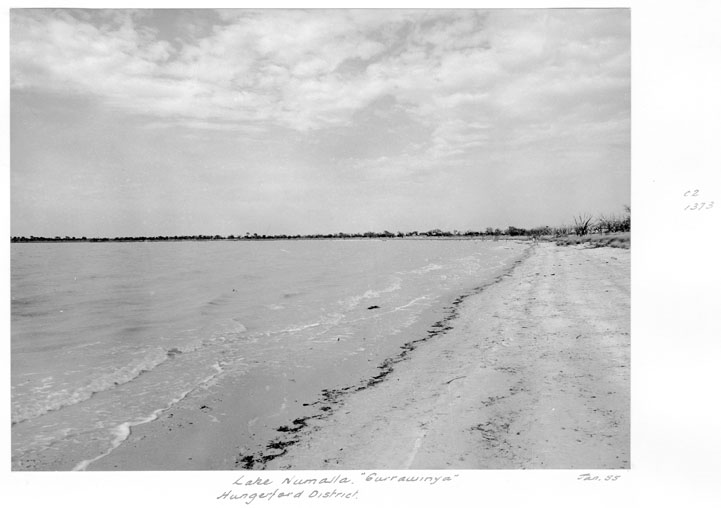
Lake Numalla Currawinya Hungerford District January 1955

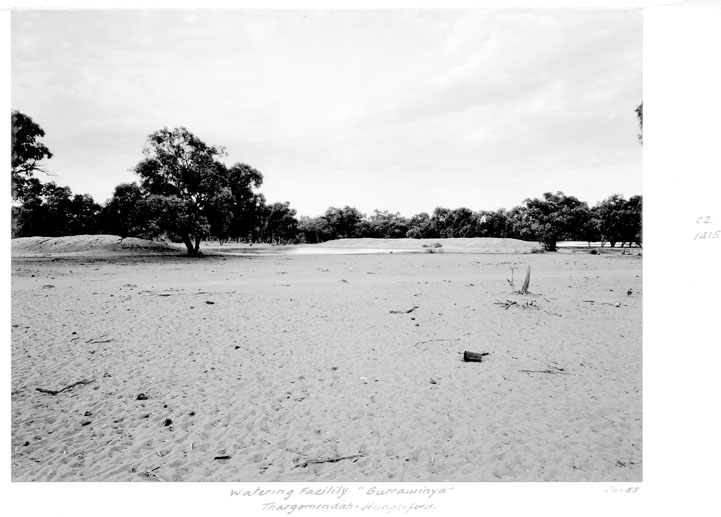
Currawinya in Numalla County in 1955

The county was the traditional lands of the Badjiri people. European settlement began in the 1870s.

The largest town in the county is Hungerford, Queensland and the nearest railway is at Eulo, Queensland.The only airport is Hungerford Aerodrome operated by the Bulloo Shire Council.

All of the county is incorporated with two local government agencies Shire of Bulloo in the west and Shire of Paroo in the east.

== Ecology ==
Lake Numalla and the adjoining Mulga Lands form the Currawinya National Park and are part of the Paroo Floodplain and Currawinya Important Bird Area a ramsar site for migratory birds. The park is also home to the macrotis and greater bilby. A bilby proof fence circles the park and a dingo fence runs along the state border.
