= Mucruss Parish (Irrara County), New South Wales =

Mucruss Parish (Irrara County), New South Wales is a remote civil Parish, of Irrara County, a cadasteral division of New South Wales.

== Geography ==
The parish is located at 29°21′51″S 144°56′31″E in Bourke Shire.

The topography of the area is flat and arid with a Köppen climate classification of BSh (Hot semi arid).

The economy in the parish is based on broad acre agriculture, mainly Cattle, and sheep. The only settlement in the parish is the ghost town of Yantabulla, New South Wales with Hungerford, Queensland to the north the nearest settlement by road.

Mucruss Parish will be the site of a Total Solar Eclipse on 22 July 2028.

== See also ==
- Irrara County
