= Berawinnia Parish (Irrara County), New South Wales =

Civil parish in NSW, Australia

Berawinnia Parish (Irrara County), New South Wales is a remote civil parish, of Irrara County, a cadasteral division of New South Wales.

Berawinnia Parish is one of the few parts of Irrara County that is unincorporated.

== Geography ==
The topography of the area is flat and arid with a Köppen climate classification of BSh (Hot semi-arid).

Berawinna is on the Paroo River and is on the traditional lands of the Badjiri people.

The economy in the parish is based on broad acre agriculture, mainly cattle, and sheep.

The Queensland border runs along the northern boundary of the parish (and the County of Irrara) and the parish has no towns though Hungerford, Queensland is just over the border from the parish. A village of Berwinnia was planned and layout as a suburb of Hungerford, but the village never developed. Hungerford remains the nearest settlement.

Berawinna will be a site of the total solar eclipse on 22 July 2028, and will be again on 25 November 2030.

== See also ==
- Irrara County#Parishes within this county
