= Warroo Parish (Irrara County), New South Wales =

Warroo Parish is a remote civil Parish, of Irrara County, a cadasteral division of New South Wales. Warroo Parish is on the Queensland-New South Wales border just east of Hungerford, Queensland.

== Geography ==
The topography of the area is flat and arid with a Köppen climate classification of BSh (Hot semi arid).

The economy in the parish is based on broad acre agriculture, mainly Cattle, and sheep. The parish has no towns in the parish and the nearest settlement is Hungerford, Queensland to the west.

Waroo will be the site of a Total Solar Eclipse on 22 July 2028.

== See also ==
- Irrara County#Parishes within this county
