= Talyealye Parish (Irrara County), New South Wales =

Civil parish of New South Wales, Australia

Talyealye Parish (Irrara County), New South Wales is a remote civil parish of Irrara County, a cadasteral division of New South Wales.

== Geography ==
The parish is on the Paroo River between Hungerford, Queensland and Wanaaring, New South Wales, and the topography of the area is flat and arid with a Köppen climate classification of BSh (hot semi-arid).

The economy in the parish is based on broad acre agriculture, mainly cattle, and sheep. The parish has no towns in the parish and the nearest settlement is Wanaaring, New South Wales with Hungerford, Queensland to the north.

== See also ==
- Irrara County#Parishes within this county
