= Gasteen =

Gasteen is a surname. Notable people with the surname include:

- Francesca Gasteen (fl. 2007), Australian actress
- Jim Gasteen (1922–2017), Australian farmer and conservationist
- Lisa Gasteen (born 1957), Australian operatic soprano
