= Yernca Parish (Irrara County), New South Wales =

Australian civil parish

Yernca Parish (Irrara County), New South Wales is a remote civil Parish, of Irrara County, a cadasteral division of New South Wales.

== Geography ==
The topography of the area is flat and arid with a Köppen climate classification of BSh (Hot semi arid).

The economy in the parish is based on broad acre agriculture, mainly Cattle, and sheep. The parish is on the Paroo River and has no towns in the parish. The nearest settlement is Wanaaring, New South Wales to the south with Hungerford, Queensland upstream.

== See also ==
- Irrara County#Parishes within this county
