= Irrara County =

Irrara New South Wales
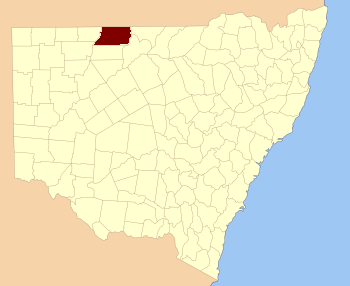
- Location in New South Wales
Lands administrative divisions around Irrara:
Queensland	Queensland	Queensland
Thoulcanna	Irrara	Culgoa
Ularara	Barrona	Gunderbooka

Irrara County is one of the 141 cadastral divisions of New South Wales. It is located south of the border with Queensland, east of the Paroo River, and west of the Warrego River.

Irrara County has now towns of any size. The only settlements are the localities of Yantabulla, New South Wales and Fords Bridge, New South Wales. Yantabulla has been noted as being the future location of the rare double-sighting of solar eclipses within short intervals of one another.

Barringun, Queensland at the north eastern corner of the County, Hungerford, Queensland at the north west corner of the county Enngonia, New South Wales and Waanaring, New South Wales at the south west corner of the county all lie just outside the county.

Irrara is believed to be derived from a local Aboriginal word.

== Parishes within this county ==
A full list of parishes found within this county; their current LGA and mapping coordinates to the approximate centre of each location is as follows:

Parish	LGA	Coordinates
Ardfert	Bourke Shire	29°21′01″S 144°44′05″E
Ashton	Bourke Shire	29°19′38″S 145°15′04″E
Bantry	Bourke Shire	29°20′38″S 145°23′00″E
Berawinnia	Unincorporated	29°01′44″S 144°24′13″E
Birrawarra	Bourke Shire	29°16′19″S 145°13′38″E
Boomery	Bourke Shire	29°37′15″S 145°36′34″E
Boongunnyarra	Bourke Shire	29°21′07″S 145°06′51″E
Lismore South	Bourke Shire	29°38′46″S 144°55′36″E
Lismore	Bourke Shire	29°28′51″S 144°56′06″E
Conroy	Bourke Shire	29°22′45″S 145°42′01″E
Coonbilly	Bourke Shire	29°30′39″S 145°13′50″E
Dungarvan	Bourke Shire	29°31′57″S 144°50′05″E
Dwight	Bourke Shire	29°06′16″S 145°39′04″E
Effluence	Bourke Shire	unknown
Gibson	Bourke Shire	29°20′47″S 145°46′27″E
Glenample	Bourke Shire	29°02′17″S 145°05′54″E
Glenelg	Bourke Shire	29°35′36″S 145°22′40″E
Grasmere	Bourke Shire	29°32′59″S 144°38′27″E
Irrara	Bourke Shire	29°12′51″S 145°25′36″E
Kenmare	Bourke Shire	29°15′17″S 144°55′31″E
Kerribree	Bourke Shire	29°42′00″S 145°15′25″E
Kilfera	Bourke Shire	29°04′21″S 144°55′35″E
Killowen	Bourke Shire	29°10′58″S 144°44′39″E
Manatoo West	Bourke Shire	29°38′48″S 144°37′18″E
Manatoo	Bourke Shire	29°42′51″S 144°45′10″E
Merrita	Bourke Shire	29°42′41″S 145°06′04″E
Moco Barungha	Bourke Shire	29°10′14″S 145°36′11″E
Moolort	Bourke Shire	29°07′23″S 144°45′27″E
Mooroonowa	Bourke Shire	29°04′52″S 145°25′46″E
Mucruss	Bourke Shire	29°21′51″S 144°56′31″E
Mukudjeroo	Bourke Shire	29°14′10″S 145°04′24″E
Multagoona	Bourke Shire	29°27′18″S 145°32′04″E
Paroo Plains	Bourke Shire	29°42′20″S 144°29′00″E
Pelican Ponds	Bourke Shire	29°28′35″S 144°34′25″E
Penonigia	Bourke Shire	29°18′05″S 144°33′49″E
Porialla	Bourke Shire	29°02′18″S 145°16′21″E
Scott	Bourke Shire	29°11′07″S 145°45′52″E
Stony Ridge	Unincorporated	29°28′59″S 144°17′56″E
Talyealye	Bourke Shire	29°11′37″S 144°30′42″E
Tekaara	Bourke Shire	29°30′34″S 145°21′47″E
Thurnapatcha	Bourke Shire	29°24′22″S 144°27′37″E
Tyngnynia	Bourke Shire	29°15′20″S 144°37′18″E
Wapweelah	Bourke Shire	29°19′54″S 145°34′57″E
Warroo	Bourke Shire	29°04′22″S 144°38′20″E
Willyeroo	Bourke Shire	29°43′28″S 145°25′19″E
Yernca	Bourke Shire	29°34′09″S 144°23′49″E
Youngarignia	Bourke Shire	29°28′43″S 145°06′03″E
