= Royal Mail Hotel, Hungerford =

Royal Mail Hotel
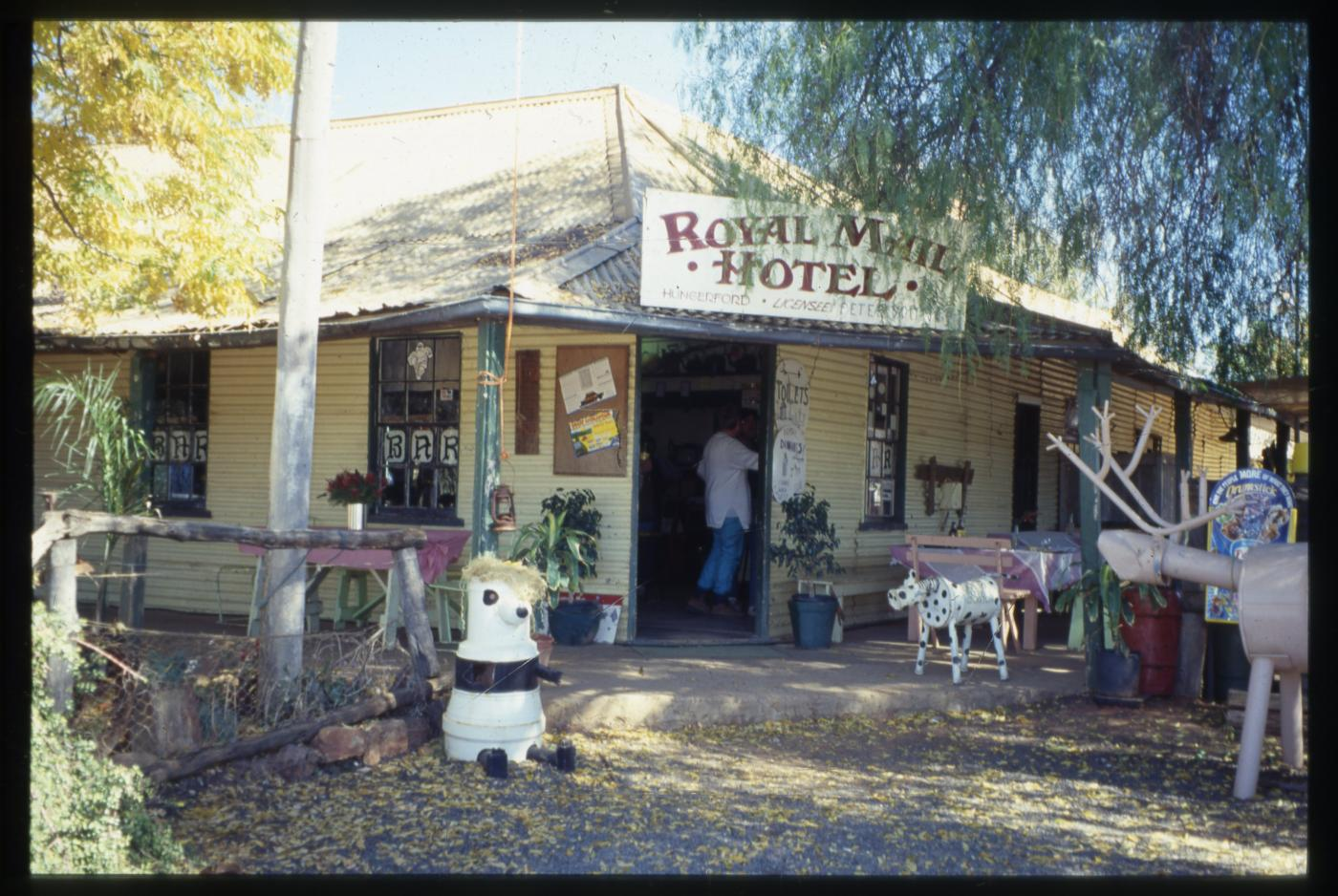
- Royal Mail Hotel

- Location within Queensland
- 28.9976°S 144.4091°E
- Location: Archernar Street, Hungerford, Shire of Bulloo, Queensland, Australia

History
- Design period: 1870s–1890s (late 19th century)
- Built: c. 1897–

Queensland Heritage Register
- Official name: Royal Mail Hotel
- Type: state heritage (built)
- Designated: 31 August 2001
- Reference no.: 601390
- Significant period: 1890s (fabric); 1897–ongoing (historical use)
- Significant components: laundry / wash house, bathroom/bathhouse, residential accommodation – staff quarters

Royal Mail Hotel is a heritage-listed hotel at Archernar Street, Hungerford, Shire of Bulloo, Queensland, Australia. It was built from c. 1897 onwards. It was added to the Queensland Heritage Register on 31 August 2001.

== History ==
The Royal Mail Hotel was granted its first license in 1874, a year before Hungerford was gazetted as a township. The town lies on the border between Queensland and New South Wales, on the east bank of the Paroo River, and was a customs post on an important early stock route running between Queensland and the markets in Victoria and South Australia.

In the 1830s pastoral settlement in New South Wales pushed northwards and in the early 1840s sheep runs were established on the Darling Downs. In the 1850s and 1860s the pastoral industry continued to expand in what became the colony of Queensland in 1859. Once pastoral stations had been established in Queensland, the transport flow began to reverse as products in the form of wool and livestock were moved to southern markets. The Victorian gold rush greatly increased the demand for beef from the 1850s. One major north–south stock route connected north west Queensland with Victoria following natural watercourses. It began in the Gulf country and passed through Cloncurry and Longreach, down the Thompson to the vicinity of Windorah, south to Hungerford and Bourke, then down the Darling River to Wilcannia and overland to Hay.

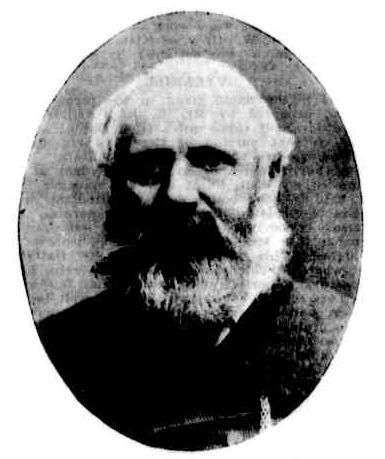
Thomas Hungerford, 1904

Hungerford is approximately 200 kilometres (120 mi) south of Cunnamulla and the same distance north of Bourke in New South Wales. It is named after Thomas Hungerford, later a Member of the Queensland Legislative Assembly, who camped there with his brother while in the district and early references to the place are as "Hungerford's Camp". Being on a major route and near a watercourse, it was an excellent location for a wayside inn, catering for drovers and carriers as well as pastoral workers. Such inns provided food and accommodation for people and horses and it was usually possible to obtain the services of a blacksmith, leave or collect messages and gain information on the condition of the road ahead. Hotels were also an important source of company and conviviality in isolated areas. Their services made the development of regular supply routes possible, which made a major contribution to the way in which areas were opened up for European settlement.

The first license for the Royal Mail Hotel was issued to John George Cooke on 6 November 1874. He was also the postmaster following an earlier attempt to set up a service based on a property at "Hoodsville", a few miles away. The name of the hotel is particularly apt as several publicans served in this capacity over the years, besides supporting a later Cobb & Co mail and passenger service. The first post office was established at "Hungerford's" on 1 January 1876. The mail delivery contract was won by Michael McAuliffe who travelled between Bourke, Hoodsville and Hungerford's via Ford's Bridge, Yantabulla and Brindingabba, a distance of 150 miles (240 km) on horseback, once a week. Responsibility for the delivery and processing of mail moved from one colony to the other for many years because the exact position of Hungerford in relationship to the border was uncertain.

The border between New South Wales and Queensland was not officially surveyed until 1879–1880. When the Royal Mail was built, it was thought to be in New South Wales and licence fees were paid in that colony from 1874 to 1879. The survey revealed that the land was part of Queensland and from 1880 the hotel licence has been issued in Queensland. The town survey shows the hotel with yards and outbuildings close to the "Wilcannia Track". Near the hotel was a blacksmith, stock yards and "gardens" presumably for vegetables. Isaac Foster, who had acquired the hotel from Cooke in 1876, formalised his ownership by purchase of the hotel allotment and an adjoining lot in September 1880.

Other allotments in the block containing the hotel were reserved for police, post office and customs buildings because Hungerford was one of the 14 settlements along Queensland's borders used as customs posts until the colonies were federated in 1901. The customs post monitored the payment of duty on such goods as wool but also acted to prevent smuggling which was common because duty on alcohol in Queensland was high. The size of the town survey and the government reserves suggests that it was thought that the town would become larger and more important than actually occurred. New South Wales surveyed a "twin town" to Hungerford on the other side of the border, designated "Berriwinnia", although it was not developed. Customs posts on state borders were not needed after Federation and it may be that if it had not occurred Hungerford may eventually have achieved its projected size. Beginning in 1882, Cobb and Co ran weekly buggies between Hungerford and Eulo and Thargomindah and Hungerford transporting mail, goods and passengers. The route officially ran between post offices in each settlement, but nearby hotels were commonly used by coach companies to change horses and accommodate passengers and this was the case with the Royal Mail Hotel. Isaac Foster died in 1882 and the license passed briefly to two other men before being taken up by Charles Wethered who held it until 1889, when it was taken over by Thomas G. Foster, who was possibly a relative of Isaac. By this time the Royal Mail Hotel had competition in the form of the Commercial Hotel, built in 1885. The Western railway line had by then reached Cunnamulla and with the coach link, provided access to larger centres.

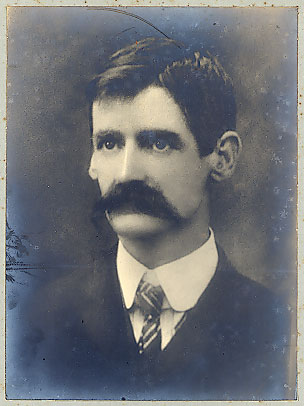
Henry Lawson, 1902

Over December 1892 and January 1893 Henry Lawson and a friend walked from Bourke to Hungerford and back. In spite of writing about the bush he had little real experience and is thought to have been goaded into the trip by public comments to that effect made by Banjo Paterson. He found the country harsh and did not care for Hungerford from which he wrote a despairing letter to his aunt saying that he was finished with the bush. Even so, this trip proved the inspiration for a number of his early stories and poems so that Hungerford may be said to have contributed to the Legend of the Bush developed in the late 19th century by such writers as Lawson. Lawson described Hungerford in a short story of that name which appeared in While the Billy Boils in 1896:

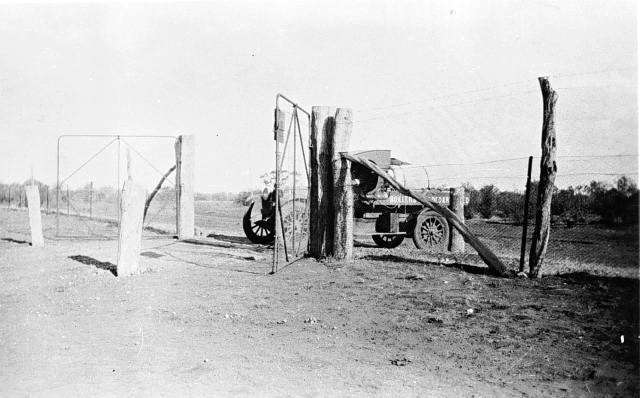
Rabbit-proof fence, Hungerford, 1935

The town is right on the Queensland border, and an interprovincial rabbit-proof fence – with rabbits on both sides of it – runs across the main street. Hungerford consists of two houses and a humpy in New South Wales, and five houses in Queensland. Characteristically enough, both the pubs are in Queensland. We got a glass of sour yeast at one and paid sixpence for it – we had asked for English ale.

The post office is in New South Wales, and the police barracks in Bananaland. The police cannot do anything if there's a row going on across the street in New South Wales except to send to Brisbane and have an extradition warrant applied for; and they do not do much if there's a row in Queensland. Most of the rows are across the border, where the pubs are.

Hungerford was quite prosperous as a small centre though, and in 1895 Cobb and Co upgraded its service between Hungerford and Thargomindah to a coach route. In this year John Logan became the licensee of the Royal Mail. He also purchased the large adjoining reserve on which the blacksmiths and yards had been located in 1880. In 1897 he acquired title to both the hotel allotments and took out a mortgage of £250 on all 3 lots, a total of £750. The purpose of this loan is not known, but it may have been at this time that the hotel was moved to the reserve allotment or a new building constructed or recycled from the old. The current hotel contains features such as windows which are consistent with an earlier building date, but has been added to and adapted over the years using traditional techniques and materials, so that a construction date is difficult to ascertain.

John Logan died in 1907 and his widow, Margaret, became the licensee. By this time, the town had passed its peak when it had a population of over 100 and a magistrate's court, police station, post and telegraph office, a school, 4 churches, several shops and 3 hotels.

Following Federation, border customs posts were no longer needed. The early years of the century were also very dry and although the Wilcannia Track originally had many waterholes and springs, widespread tapping of the artesian basin caused the level of springs to fall and dry up. An attempt to sink a bore at Hungerford was abandoned at 850 feet (260 m). The Cobb & Co service to Hungerford was discontinued in 1904 and by 1915 Hungerford had been bypassed and was merely a turn off on the Cunnamulla to Thargomindah coach route.

The hotel was sold in 1928, though the original 2 lots (105 and 104) were not and were taken over by the Bulloo Shire Council in 1971. The Royal Mail has since had several licensees, and the hotel was sold again in 2000. The town population has in recent years been as low as 10 and the Royal Mail has been the only hotel for most of the 20th century, drawing custom from local people and seasonal pastoral workers. Following the opening of nearby Currawinya National Park, custom is being increasingly drawn from tourism.

== Description ==
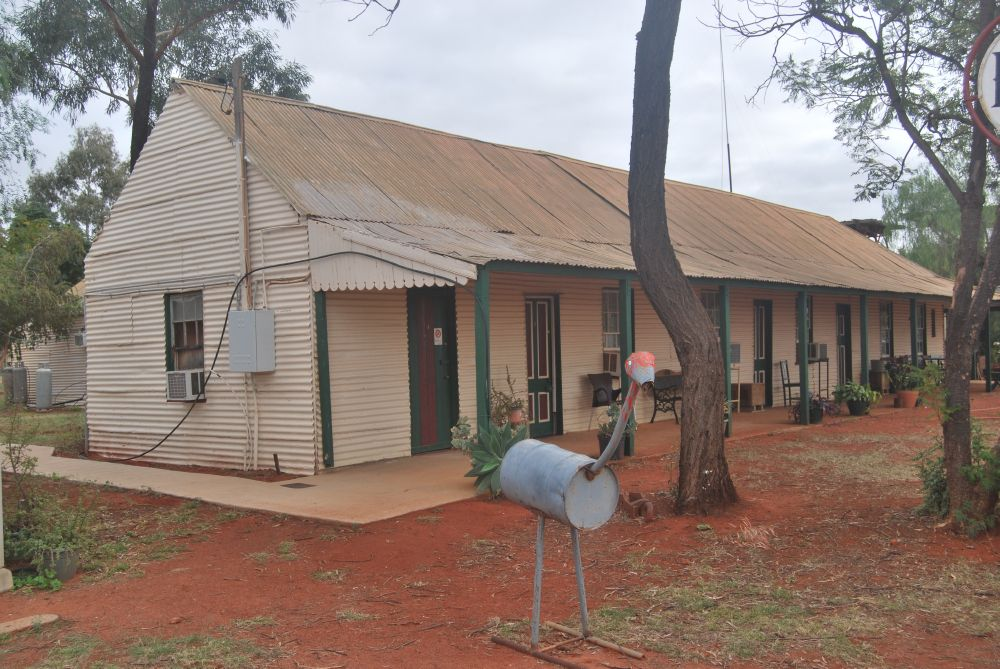
Royal Mail Hotel, 2013

The Royal Mail Hotel is a single storey building with a timber frame clad and roofed in corrugated iron. It has two major elevations with a corner entrance and a wing extending to the rear forming a U-shaped plan.

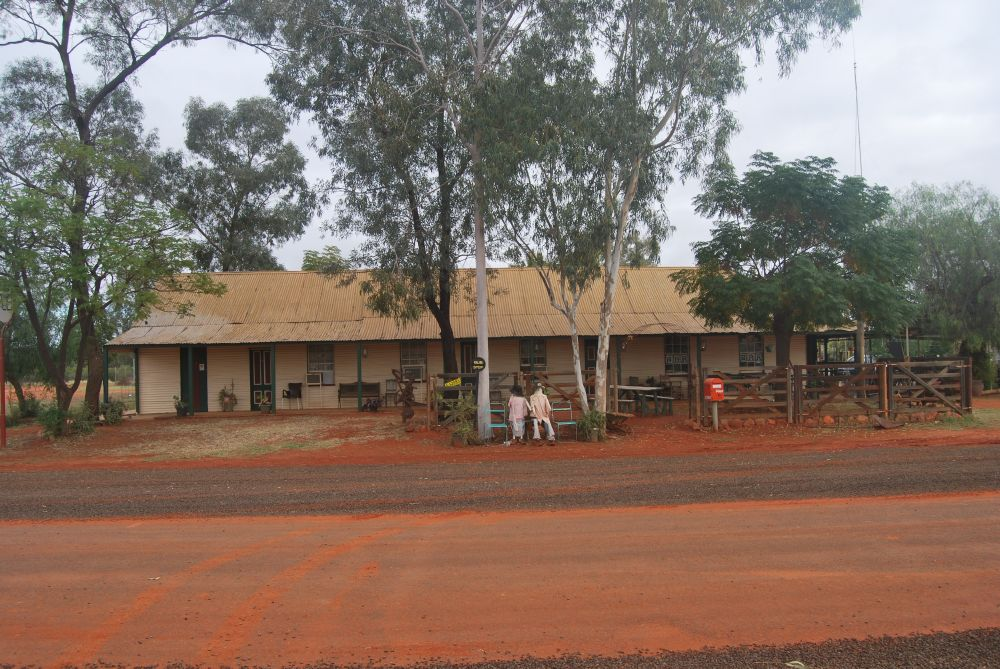
Royal Mail Hotel, 2013

The main entrance is on a truncated section at the north eastern corner and the gabled roof and awning is truncated to match. A wide awning supported on timber columns runs around both main elevations and the corner. The corner entrance opens onto the bar which has a high ceiling, is lined with pine boards and has 12 pane sash windows. A double sided brick chimney is between the bar and the original sitting room. The bar fireplace is formed with a brick arch and is in regular use. That to the room behind is lined with ripple iron. A room adjoining the sitting room was also part of the original living quarters, but is now used as a store room. The cellar survives and is reached by a handmade ladder. Shelving for kegs has been cut out of the earth.

The original dining room is now living quarters for the licensees. The ceiling and most of the walls are lined with ripple iron as is the pub kitchen and a private bedroom. Modern sliding doors have been added to the kitchen and living quarters. There are 3 guest bedrooms approximately 12 feet (3.7 m) square. 2 rooms are lined with pine boards, but the other is ceiled and lined largely with ripple iron, a material that has also been used in parts of the bar and dining area.

The outbuildings are clad with corrugated iron and consist of 2 bathrooms and an unused washhouse. Bathroom fittings are early and feature ripple iron lining and a claw foot bath. The former staff quarters has lost its cladding to all but one wall and is used as a storage shed.

== Heritage listing ==
Royal Mail Hotel was listed on the Queensland Heritage Register on 31 August 2001 having satisfied the following criteria.

The place is important in demonstrating the evolution or pattern of Queensland's history.

The Royal Mail Hotel illustrates the pattern of development of Queensland in several ways. It was built as a wayside inn serving an early stock and trading route and provided the foundation for a service town as did many such inns. The hotel also illustrates the role of Hungerford as a border post before Federation and held a New South Wales licence until the border was officially surveyed in 1879. As a hotel catering for coach teams and passengers and a postal receiving office from time to time, the hotel illustrates the ways in which communications functioned in remote areas in the 19th century.

The place demonstrates rare, uncommon or endangered aspects of Queensland's cultural heritage.

The Royal Mail Hotel is now uncommon in Queensland as a coaching inn still trading.

The place has potential to yield information that will contribute to an understanding of Queensland's history.

The hotel complex has the potential to reveal information about the operation of 19th century hotels in Queensland.

The place is important in demonstrating the principal characteristics of a particular class of cultural places.

It is a good example of a vernacular hotel in a remote township as it preserves examples of early building techniques and has changed little in the last century

The place is important because of its aesthetic significance.

The Royal Mail Hotel is important as a vernacular building whose form, scale and materials make a substantial contribution to the built character of Hungerford and which is a landmark well regarded by the community.

The place has a strong or special association with a particular community or cultural group for social, cultural or spiritual reasons.

It is important for its long connection with the community of Hungerford and the surrounding area as a venue for many social events.

The place has a special association with the life or work of a particular person, group or organisation of importance in Queensland's history.

The settlement of Hungerford, including the Royal Mail Hotel, is important for its connection with the life and work of Henry Lawson; Hungerford being the subject of one of his popular writings that contributed to the Australian view of the bush at the end of the 19th century.
