= Thurnapatcha, New South Wales =

Parish

Thurnapatcha, New South Wales is a rural locality of Burke Shire and a remote civil Parish, of Irrara County, a cadasteral division of New South Wales.

== Geography ==
The Parish is on the Paroo River between Hungerford, Queensland and Wanaaring, New South Wales, and the topography of the area is flat and arid with a Köppen climate classification of BSh (Hot semi arid).

The economy in the parish is based on broad acre agriculture, mainly Cattle, and sheep. The parish has no towns in the parish and the nearest settlement is Wanaaring, New South Wales with Hungerford, Queensland to the north.

== See also ==
- Irrara County#Parishes within this county
