= Kilfera Parish (Irrara County), New South Wales =

Kilfera Parish on the New South Wales - Queensland border in Bourke Shire is a remote civil Parish, of Irrara County, a cadasteral division of New South Wales.

== Geography ==
The topography of the area is flat and arid with a Köppen climate classification of BSh (Hot semi arid).

The economy in the parish is based on broad acre agriculture, mainly Cattle, and sheep. The parish has no towns in the parish and the nearest settlement is Hungerford, Queensland to the west.

== See also ==
- Irrara County § Parishes within this county
