= Jim Gasteen =

Australian farmer and conservationist

Jim Gasteen AM
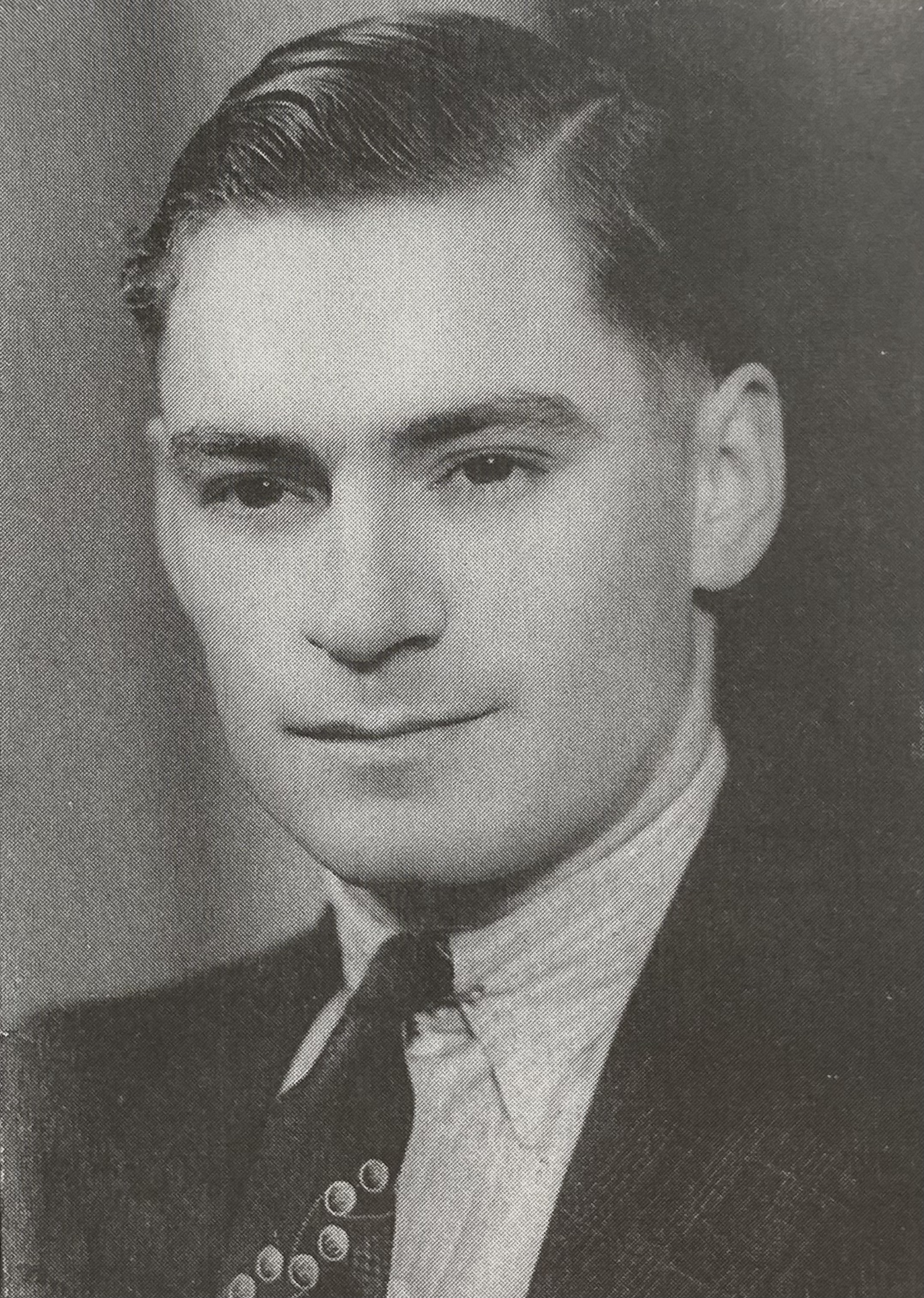
- Gasteen in 1942 (Aged 20)
- Born: Wrixon Jim Gasteen; 1922; Brisbane, Australia
- Died: 2017 (aged 94–95); Lismore
- Spouse: Marj Pearce
- Awards: Member of the Order of Australia (AM) for nature conservation and as an advocate of balanced land use management (1993).

Jim Gasteen AM (1922–2017) was an Australian farmer and conservationist, responsible for the establishment of a number of National Parks in Queensland and New South Wales.

== Early life ==
Wrixon James Gasteen was born in Brisbane, Queensland in 1922. He grew up on farms around Thrushton, Queensland where his father used the mulga lands as feedstock. Gasteen educated himself in a number of subjects including land management, geology, botany, biology and wood-turning. The family farm completely regenerated over time and Gasteen petitioned the Queensland government to make it a national park. Gasteen's book Under the Mulga (2005) reflected his early life on the land.

== Career ==
In the 1960s and 1970s Gasteen was involved in surveying and promoting National Parks proposals across Queensland. This was unpopular with many graziers and politicians. He worked to protect remnant patches of Central Queensland scrub but also surveyed land from the Gulf of Carpentaria in Queenland's north to the Scenic Rim on the Queensland/New South Wales border. His survey work or reports led to the establishment of Expedition National Park, Nuga Nuga National Park, New England National Park, Rinyirru National Park, Boodjamulla National Park, Northern Rivers National Park and Border Ranges National Park.

== Memberships and awards ==
- Appointed Member of the Order of Australia (AM) for "nature conservation and as an advocate of balanced land use management" in 1993.
- Life member of the Wildlife Preservation Society of Queensland.

Gasteen also wrote They All Left Tracks (2003) and Back to the Bush (2011).

Gasteen died in Lismore, New South Wales in August 2017 He was married and had four children. Ten boxes of Gasteen's notebooks, photographs and correspondence are held in the University of Queensland Fryer Library.
