= Thrushton National Park =

National park in Australia

- IUCN category II (national park)
- Location within Queensland
- Location: Queensland
- Coordinates: 27°45′50″S 147°40′00″E
- Area: 256.52 km^{2} (99.04 sq mi)
- Established: 1990
- Governing body: Queensland Parks and Wildlife Service
- Website: Official website

Thrushton is a national park in South West Queensland, Australia, 520 km West of Brisbane.

Dense mulga scrub typical of Queensland's Mulga Lands bioregion grows in this park. The park also protects flat spinifex sandplains, dry eucalypt woodlands and relics of the former sheep grazing era.

The land was previously grazed by the Gasteen and other families. They lobbied for it to become a national park in the late 1980s.

== See also ==
- Protected areas of Queensland
