= Lake Numalla =

- Location within Australia
- Location: Mulga Lands, Queensland, Australia
- Coordinates: 28°44′S 144°19′E
- Type: lake

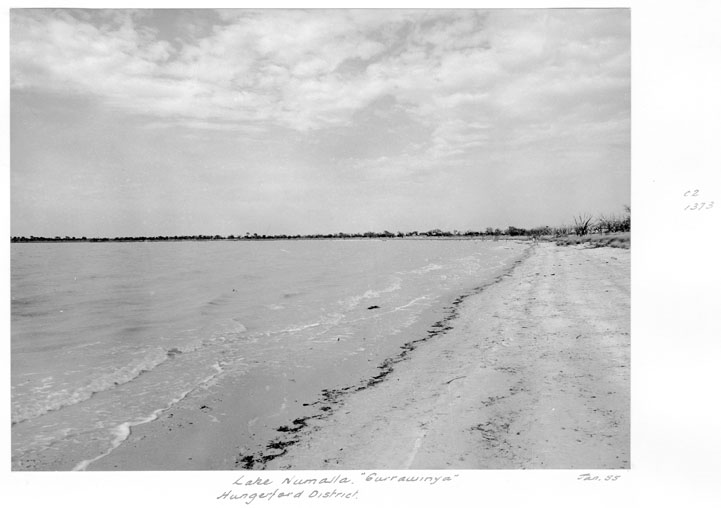
Lake Numalla in 1955.

Lake Numalla is in the Mulga Lands bioregion of Western Queensland, Australia. The area has a very dry climate, with unpredictable low rainfall (450mm-650mm per year). Lake Numalla is freshwater while nearby Lake Wyara is saline. These provide significant waterbird habitats at times of drought and for migrating waders which travel across inland Australia. 200 bird species have been recorded in the park.

The lake is part of Currawinya National Park and is a site listed under the Ramsar Convention.
