= Yantabulla, New South Wales =

Yantabulla
- Town
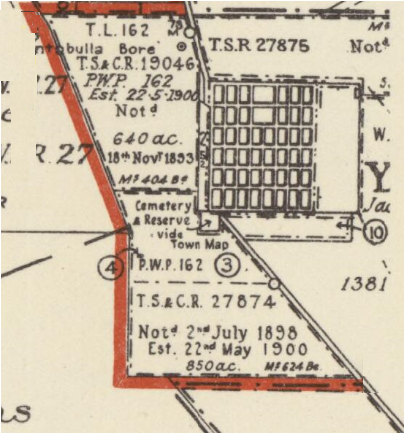
- Town map c1900

- Coordinates: 29°20′54″S 145°00′05″E
- Country: Australia
- State: New South Wales
- LGA: Bourke Shire

Government
  - State electorate: Barwon
  - Federal division: Parkes

Population
  - Total: 22 (2021 census)
- Postcode: 2840

Yantabulla, New South Wales is a ghost town in far north west New South Wales, Australia. It is on the border of New South Wales and Queensland.

The town is on the traditional lands of the Paaruntyi people.

The village is adjacent to the Yantabulla Swamp, part of the Ramsar listed Currawinya Important Bird Area.

Yantabulla has been noted as being the future location of the rare double-sighting of solar eclipses within short intervals of one another, and should experience three eclipses before 2040.

The town is in Irrara County, a cadasteral division of New South Wales.
