= Mulga Lands =

Terrestrial ecoregion in Australia

Mulga Lands Eastern Australia mulga shrublands
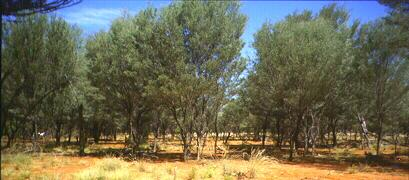
- Mulga lands in South west Queensland

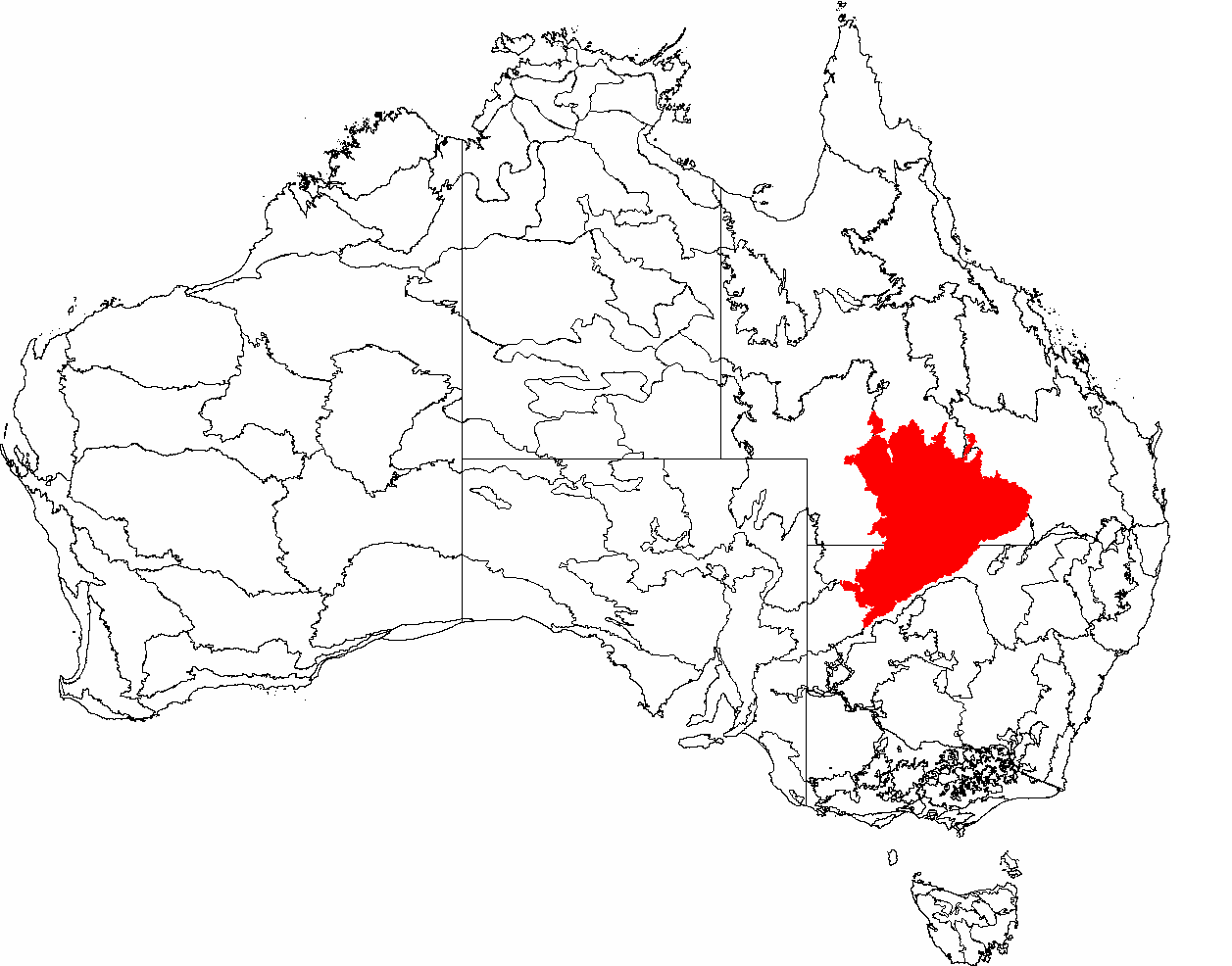
- Map of IBRA bioregions, with Mulga Lands in red

Ecology
- Realm: Australasian
- Biome: Temperate grasslands, savannas, and shrublands Deserts and xeric shrublands
- Borders: List: Brigalow tropical savanna; Mitchell Grass Downs; Southeast Australia temperate savanna; Simpson Desert, Tirari-Sturt stony desert

Geography
- Area: 251,883 km^{2} (97,253 mi^{2})
- Country: Australia
- States: New South Wales; Queensland
- Coordinates: 28°06′S 145°41′E

Conservation
- Conservation status: vulnerable
- Protected: 9,662 km^{2} (4%)

The Mulga Lands are an interim Australian bioregion of eastern Australia consisting of dry sandy plains with low mulga woodlands and shrublands that are dominated by Acacia aneura (mulga). The Eastern Australia mulga shrublands ecoregion is coterminous with the Mulga Lands bioregion.

== Location and description ==
Located in inland New South Wales and Queensland, these are flat plains with some low hills and infertile sandy soil with a cover of grasses and shrubs with mulga and eucalyptus trees. The region contains areas of wetland, most of them only seasonally flooded, these include Lake Wyara and Lake Numalla, the Currawinya Lakes, Lake Bindegolly and others on the Warrego and the Paroo Rivers, the latter of which in particular remains relatively unmanaged and in its natural state.

The area has a very dry climate, with unpredictable low rainfall (450–650 mm per year). The plains are drained in three directions: the eastern side by the Wallam, Nebine and Mungallala Creeks (tributaries of the Culgoa River), and the Warrego and Paroo rivers into the Murray-Darling basin; the southwest by the Bulloo River into wetlands near the Simpson Desert; and finally the northern side by the Barcoo River towards Lake Eyre. The Great Artesian Basin lies below these plains and more rich patches of wildlife are found around mound springs stemming from the basin.

The Mulga Lands are defined by their plant life and poor soil and as such are distinct from neighbouring ecoregions, the Brigalow Belt to the east and the Mitchell Grass Downs to the north, both of which have better soil and richer plant life. The Southeast Australia temperate savanna ecoregion lies to the south and southeast. The drier Simpson Desert and Tirari-Sturt stony desert ecoregions lie to the west.

The mulga lands are sparsely populated and mostly used for grazing sheep and cattle.

== Flora ==
Mulga trees are a type of acacia which have adapted to efficiently collect the sparse rainfall, are the distinctive habitat of this ecoregion while the ground cover consists of shrubs and grasses. However the mulga lands are not uniform and there are micro-climates and patches of other kinds of habitat, especially areas of eucalyptus woodland in the better-watered parts that have more wildlife than the mulga acacia plains themselves. Eucalyptus trees found here include bimble box, coolibah, and silver-leaved ironbark. To the east of the Warrego River in Queensland the mulga lands merge into a heath of sand dunes. Throughout the mulga lands plant life quickly flourishes after rainfall and habitats revive and change.

== Fauna ==
Currawinya National Park is part of the project to revive Australia's population of the bilby, which in the park is protected from dingos and cats. This part of Australia is generally dry and when flooded Lakes Wyara and Numalla are important habitats for birds, being home to 250,000 birds of 40 species including the rainbow bee-eater, Australasian shoveller, freckled duck, musk duck, black swan, silver gull, Australian pelican, great egret, and glossy ibis.

== Conservation and threats ==
Together with the Brigalow Belt, the Mulga Lands are where most of Queensland's land clearing is occurring. 80% of the original plant cover is intact, especially in the drier inland west, as some areas of eucalyptus woodland have been cleared in the eastern side of the area. There are no endangered habitats in the mulga lands. However, most of the area is used for grazing sheep and cattle, so there is always a danger of overgrazing while mulga leaves are used as livestock fodder and other trees are removed to create more grassland and to allow access to water sources. The mound springs are particularly affected by this. There are some areas of National Park, the largest of which is Currawinya, whose wetlands are especially important as bird habitats. Others include Hell Hole Gorge, Lake Bindegolly, Mariala, Thrushton, part of Welford, Idalia and the Culgoa Floodplain National Parks.
