= Currawinya National Park =

National park in Australia

- IUCN category II (national park)
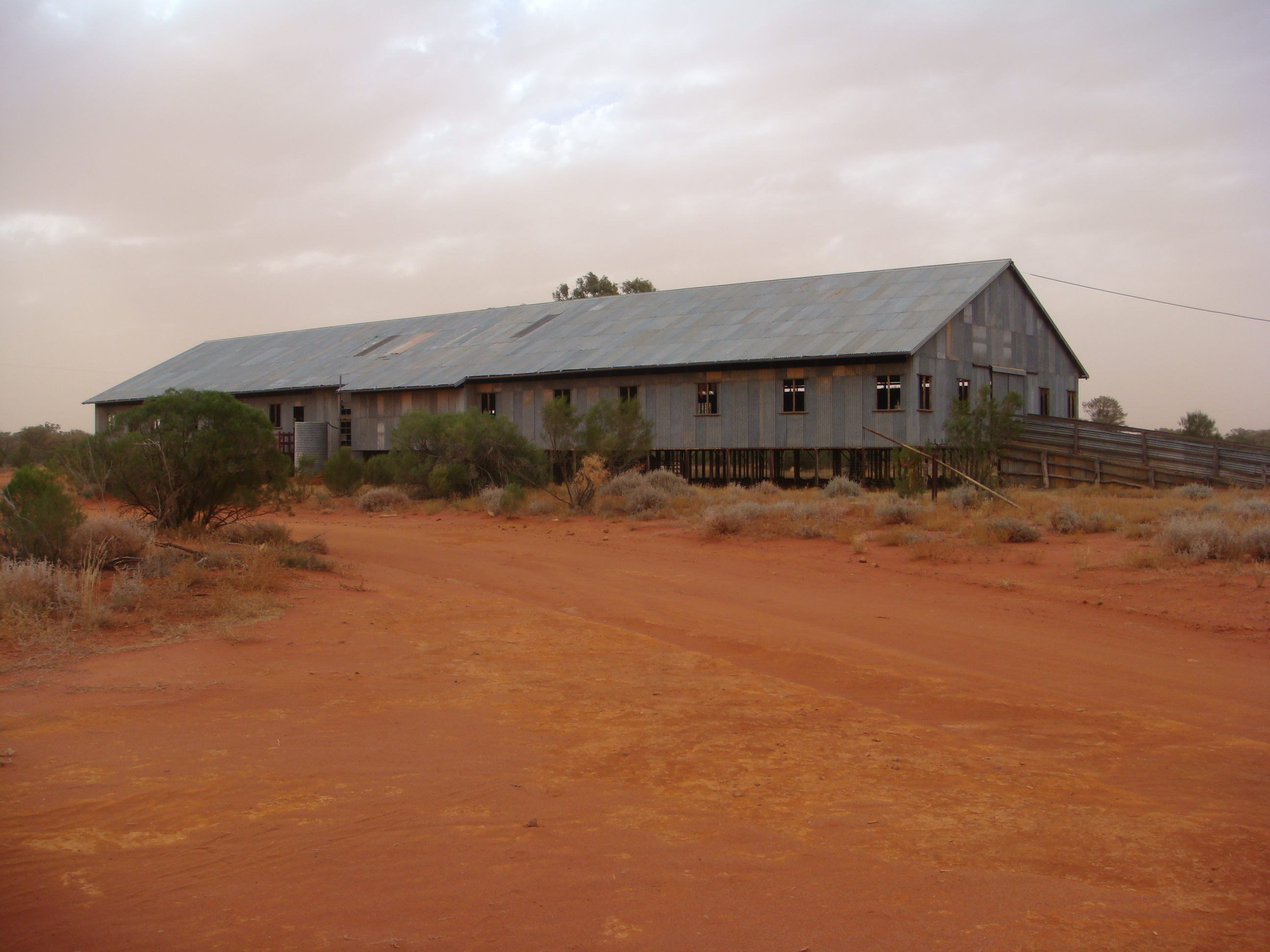
- Woolshed in Currawinya National Park

- Location within Queensland
- Location: Queensland
- Nearest city: Hungerford
- Coordinates: 28°39′S 144°24′E
- Area: 1,513 km^{2} (584 sq mi)
- Established: 1991
- Governing body: Queensland Parks and Wildlife Service
- Website: nprsr.qld.gov.au/parks/currawinya/index.html

Ramsar Wetland
- Official name: Currawinya Lakes
- Designated: 11 March 1996
- Reference no.: 791

Currawinya is a national park near Hungerford in South West Queensland, Australia, 828 km west of Brisbane. Part of the mulga lands bioregion this is an area of dry sandy plain with small trees and shrubs. The Paroo River passes through the park.

== History ==
The park contains many Indigenous Australians' sites of cultural significance, which indicate a long period of Aboriginal occupation and use of the wetlands within the park. The park was previously pastoral land. In 1991, the Government of Queensland purchased two properties, Currawinya and Caiwarro Homestead. Remains of the homestead, machinery and a levee bank still exist today. In 2015, the size of the park doubled after the state government acquired three adjoining properties.

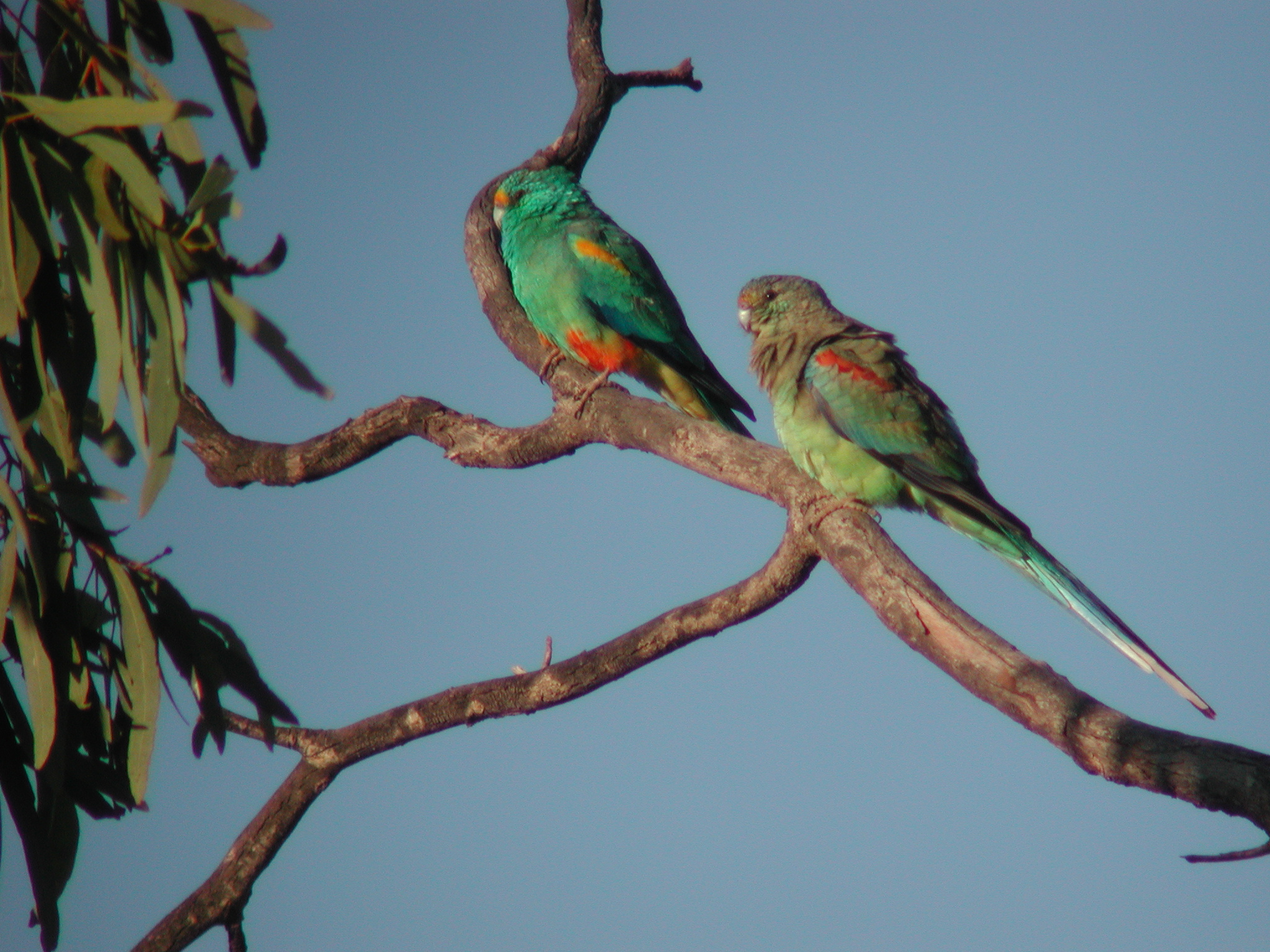
Male and female Mulga parrots

== Environment ==
Lakes Numalla and Wyara within the park are listed as Ramsar wetland sites of international importance. Lake Numalla is freshwater while Lake Wyara is saline. These provide significant waterbird habitats at times of drought and for migrating waders which travel across inland Australia. 200 bird species have been recorded in the park. Most of the park lies within the Paroo Floodplain and Currawinya Important Bird Area, identified as such by BirdLife International because of its importance, when conditions are suitable, for large numbers of waterbirds.

A total of 14 threatened species have been identified within the park.

== Bilby enclosure ==
A feature of the park is a 25 km^{2} (9.7 sq mi) bilby enclosure surrounded by a predator-exclusion fence. The electrified enclosure was opened in 2001. Captive-bred and rehabilitated bilbies once thrived within the safety of the enclosure. The fence was damaged by flooding in late 2011 and early 2012, allowing feral cats into the area. The cats proved difficult to cull and there was a temporary hold put on placing newly reared bilbies into the enclosure until feral cats are below detectable levels there. As of July 2015 there were 75 bilbies ready to be released into the enclosure, but with at least six cats remaining after around 30 were culled, release was being held back

By December 2021, bilbies from breeding programs elsewhere, such as the Charleville Bilby Experience, were being considered for introduction to the enclosure.

== Facilities ==
Fishing, canoeing and swimming are popular recreational activities in the park.

== See also ==
- List of Ramsar sites in Australia
- Protected areas of Queensland
