= Paroo Floodplain and Currawinya Important Bird Area =

Important Bird Area in New South Wales, Australia

Coordinates: 29°46′37″S 144°17′00″E

Designations

Ramsar Wetland
- Official name: Currawinya Lakes
- Designated: 11 March 1996
- Reference no.: 791

Ramsar Wetland
- Official name: Paroo River Wetlands
- Designated: 13 September 2007
- Reference no.: 1716

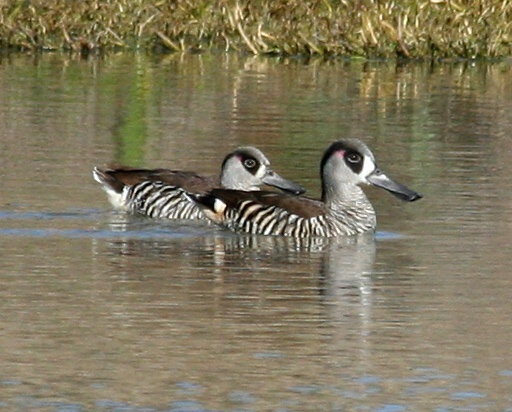
The IBA is an important area for pink-eared ducks

The Paroo Floodplain and Currawinya Important Bird Area is a 7,874 km^{2} (3,040 sq mi) site comprising the floodplain and the associated wetlands of the Paroo River in north-western New South Wales and south-western Queensland, Australia. It includes extensive areas of the Paroo-Darling and Currawinya National Parks, both of which are listed under the Ramsar Convention as wetland sites of international importance, as well as of the Nocoleche Nature Reserve.

== Description ==
The IBA contains the lower Paroo floodplain, including the overflow lakes, as well as the Yantabulla swamp and the Cuttaburra Creek floodplain. The area contains a complex network of channels, wetlands and lakes. Water is received from local rainfall or the Paroo River. Floods occur erratically; water enters from the Paroo, the Warrego River via Cuttaburra Creek and other channels, or backs up from the Darling River in the south, filling shallow channels, floodplain depressions and numerous ephemeral lakes. Ranging to 5.5 m in depth, some lakes retain water for up to three years. The shores and channels support samphire, lignum, canegrass and other grasses, with black-box and other riparian woodland communities which flood seasonally. Currawinya National Park also has Acacia shrublands on sand sheets and dunes. The region has a desert climate, with low and very variable rainfall usually falling in summer; mean annual rainfall at Currawinya is 278 mm.

== Birds ==
The site has been identified by BirdLife International as an Important Bird Area (IBA) because, when conditions are suitable, it supports up to 400,000 waterbirds with over 1% of the world populations of black swans, freckled and pink-eared ducks, grey teals, Australasian shovelers, hardheads, red-necked avocets, white-headed and banded stilts, sharp-tailed sandpipers and red-capped plovers. It supports regionally significant numbers of Australian pelicans, Eurasian coots and whiskered terns. It also holds populations of inland dotterels, Caspian terns, Bourke's parrots, grey-headed, black and pied honeyeaters, slaty-backed thornbills, Hall's babblers, chirruping wedgebills and chestnut-breasted quail-thrushes.
