= Solar eclipse of July 22, 2028 =

Total eclipse

- Total eclipse
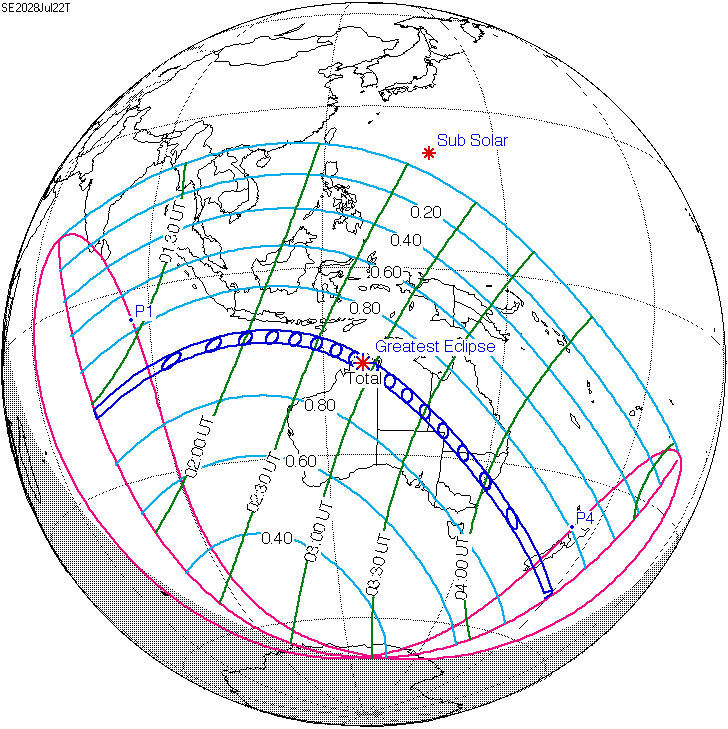
- Map
- Gamma: −0.6056
- Magnitude: 1.056

Maximum eclipse
- Duration: 310 s (5 min 10 s)
- Coordinates: 15.6°S 126.7°E
- Max. width of band: 230 km (140 mi)

Times (UTC)
- Greatest eclipse: 2:56:40

References
- Saros: 146 (28 of 76)
- Catalog # (SE5000): 9570

A solar eclipse, also called the Great Australasian Eclipse by some media outlets, will occur at the Moon's descending node of orbit on Saturday, July 22, 2028, with a magnitude of 1.056. A solar eclipse occurs when the Moon passes between Earth and the Sun, thereby totally or partly obscuring the image of the Sun for a viewer on Earth. A total solar eclipse occurs when the Moon's apparent diameter is larger than the Sun's, blocking all direct sunlight, turning day into darkness. Totality occurs in a narrow path across Earth's surface, with the partial solar eclipse visible over a surrounding region thousands of kilometres wide. Occurring about 1.8 days before perigee (on July 23, 2028, at 23:20 UTC), the Moon's apparent diameter will be larger.

The central line of the path of the eclipse will cross the Australian continent from the Kimberley region in the north-west and continue in a south-easterly direction through Western Australia, the Northern Territory, south-west Queensland and New South Wales, close to the towns of Wyndham, Kununurra, Tennant Creek, Birdsville, Bourke and Dubbo, and continuing on through the centre of Sydney, where the eclipse will have a duration of over three minutes. It will also cross Queenstown and Dunedin, New Zealand. Totality will also be viewable from two of Australia's external territories: Christmas Island and the Cocos (Keeling) Islands. A partial eclipse will be visible for parts of Southeast Asia, Australia, and Oceania.

This is the first time Sydney will experience a total solar eclipse since March 26, 1857 and will be the last until June 3, 2858. It will be the first total solar eclipse visible anywhere in New Zealand since 1965, and the first one experienced by Dunedin since 1163, when New Zealand was still uninhabited.

== Eclipse timing ==
=== Places experiencing total eclipse ===
Solar eclipse of July 22, 2028 (local times)
Country or territory	City or place	Start of partial eclipse	Start of total eclipse	Maximum eclipse	End of total eclipse	End of partial eclipse	Duration of totality (min:s)	Duration of eclipse (hr:min)	Maximum magnitude
Cocos (Keeling) Islands	Bantam	07:03:38	08:12:03	08:13:48	08:15:34	09:35:17	3:31	2:32	1.0199
Christmas Island	Flying Fish Cove	07:39:42	08:54:49	08:56:45	08:58:42	10:25:33	3:53	2:46	1.0166
Australia	Durack Range - Doon Doon, near Kununurra	09:27:32	10:58:08	11:00:43	11:03:18	12:32:50	5:10	3:05	1.0283
Australia	Kununurra	09:27:52	10:59:46	11:01:13	11:02:40	12:33:14	2:54	2:54	1.0051
Australia	Lake Argyle	09:28:19	10:59:29	11:01:39	11:03:48	12:33:36	4:19	3:05	1.0129
Australia	Tennant Creek	11:16:50	12:47:58	12:49:41	12:51:24	14:17:30	3:26	3:01	1.0079
Australia	Bourke	12:27:17	13:50:08	13:52:11	13:54:13	15:09:20	4:05	2:42	1.022
Australia	Dubbo	12:34:34	13:55:20	13:57:16	13:59:11	15:12:17	3:51	2:38	1.0197
Australia	Orange	12:36:16	13:57:12	13:58:17	13:59:22	15:12:45	2:10	2:36	1.0049
Australia	Mudgee	12:36:45	13:56:52	13:58:49	14:00:46	15:13:12	3:54	2:36	1.0237
Australia	Bathurst	12:37:18	13:57:31	13:59:01	14:00:31	15:13:11	3:00	2:36	1.0098
Australia	Katoomba	12:38:53	13:58:23	14:00:08	14:01:53	15:13:50	3:30	2:35	1.0153
Australia	Penrith	12:39:39	13:58:48	14:00:41	14:02:34	15:14:11	3:46	2:35	1.0208
Australia	Campbelltown	12:40:03	13:59:09	14:00:55	14:02:39	15:14:15	3:30	2:34	1.0157
Australia	Blacktown	12:40:03	13:59:04	14:00:59	14:02:53	15:14:21	3:49	2:34	1.0239
Australia	Kiama	12:40:30	14:00:16	14:01:04	14:01:52	15:14:14	1:36	2:34	1.0029
Australia	Wollongong	12:40:25	13:59:40	14:01:05	14:02:30	15:14:17	2:50	2:34	1.009
Australia	Pennant Hills	12:40:20	13:59:17	14:01:12	14:03:06	15:14:30	3:49	2:34	1.0243
Australia	Canterbury	12:40:32	13:59:24	14:01:18	14:03:12	15:14:32	3:48	2:34	1.0241
Australia	Sydney	12:40:40	13:59:30	14:01:25	14:03:19	15:14:36	3:49	2:34	1.0248
Australia	Darlinghurst	12:40:42	13:59:31	14:01:26	14:03:20	15:14:37	3:49	2:34	1.0249
Australia	Mosman	12:40:43	13:59:33	14:01:28	14:03:21	15:14:38	3:48	2:34	1.0235
Australia	Gosford	12:40:40	13:59:51	14:01:31	14:03:10	15:14:44	3:19	2:34	1.0128
Australia	Norah Head	12:41:01	14:00:35	14:01:48	14:03:00	15:14:55	2:25	2:34	1.0058
New Zealand	Queenstown	15:07:25	16:15:04	16:16:32	16:17:59	17:20:03	2:55	2:13	1.0211
New Zealand	Dunedin	15:09:01	16:15:47	16:17:13	16:18:38	17:20:00	2:51	2:12	1.0218
New Zealand	Ranfurly	15:08:53	16:16:15	16:17:24	16:18:33	17:20:23	2:18	2:16	1.0091

=== Places experiencing partial eclipse ===
Solar eclipse of July 22, 2028 (local times)
Country or territory	City or place	Start of partial eclipse	Maximum eclipse	End of partial eclipse	Duration of eclipse (hr:min)	Maximum coverage
Maldives	Malé	06:02:44 (sunrise)	06:19:54	07:05:15	1:03	22.26%
India	Thiruvananthapuram	06:12:50	06:50:02	07:30:03	1:18	13.49%
Sri Lanka	Sri Jayawardenepura Kotte	06:07:56	06:50:56	07:37:51	1:35	20.77%
Maldives	Addu City	06:11:25 (sunrise)	06:20:57	07:13:22	1:02	37.34%
British Indian Ocean Territory	Diego Garcia	07:24:06 (sunrise)	07:27:19	08:22:03	0:58	58.92%
Myanmar	Yangon	07:26:22	08:00:48	08:37:31	1:11	6.21%
Thailand	Bangkok	07:47:51	08:35:20	09:27:12	1:39	15.89%
Malaysia	Kuala Lumpur	08:34:02	09:39:56	10:55:08	2:21	52.16%
Cambodia	Phnom Penh	07:45:40	08:41:22	09:42:57	1:57	24.12%
Singapore	Singapore	08:34:39	09:44:09	11:03:43	2:29	60.16%
Vietnam	Ho Chi Minh City	07:45:39	08:44:12	09:49:04	2:03	27.17%
Indonesia	Jakarta	07:38:03	08:54:52	10:23:12	2:45	88.63%
French Southern and Antarctic Lands	Île Amsterdam	06:57:50 (sunrise)	07:02:00	07:57:50	1:00	45.72%
Brunei	Bandar Seri Begawan	08:48:37	10:02:11	11:23:25	2:35	47.56%
Philippines	Manila	09:13:34	10:07:17	11:03:49	1:50	13.44%
Philippines	Davao City	09:11:07	10:23:39	11:39:10	2:28	32.46%
Philippines	General Santos	09:09:11	10:23:41	11:41:28	2:32	36.04%
Timor-Leste	Dili	10:11:54	11:42:58	13:16:17	3:04	85.00%
Palau	Ngerulmud	10:38:19	11:43:41	12:48:32	2:10	19.52%
Antarctica	Casey Station	10:24:51	11:12:33	12:00:46	1:36	18.69%
Papua New Guinea	Port Moresby	12:17:02	13:35:33	14:47:12	2:30	41.44%
Antarctica	Dumont d'Urville Station	12:43:51	13:38:47	14:32:41	1:49	31.38%
Australia	Melbourne	12:32:23	13:52:56	15:07:12	2:35	81.47%
Solomon Islands	Honiara	14:04:02	14:57:21	15:46:25	1:42	14.46%
Vanuatu	Port Vila	14:21:35	15:15:00	16:03:55	1:42	20.09%
New Caledonia	Nouméa	14:12:37	15:15:39	16:12:43	2:00	36.20%
Norfolk Island	Kingston	14:12:04	15:19:11	16:19:52	2:08	54.42%
New Zealand	Wellington	15:15:41	16:22:00	17:17:03 (sunset)	2:01	82.62%
New Zealand	Auckland	15:18:21	16:23:32	17:23:01	2:05	67.80%
Fiji	Suva	15:48:14	16:23:37	16:56:56	1:09	7.02%

== Eclipse details ==
Shown below are two tables displaying details about this particular solar eclipse. The first table outlines times at which the Moon's penumbra or umbra attains the specific parameter, and the second table describes various other parameters pertaining to this eclipse.

July 22, 2028 solar eclipse times
Event	Time (UTC)
First penumbral external contact	2028 July 22 at 00:28:44.4 UTC
First umbral external contact	2028 July 22 at 01:31:51.9 UTC
First central line	2028 July 22 at 01:33:16.8 UTC
First umbral internal contact	2028 July 22 at 01:34:42.2 UTC
Greatest duration	2028 July 22 at 02:53:30.9 UTC
Greatest eclipse	2028 July 22 at 02:56:39.6 UTC
Ecliptic conjunction	2028 July 22 at 03:02:52.3 UTC
Equatorial conjunction	2028 July 22 at 03:17:00.0 UTC
Last umbral internal contact	2028 July 22 at 04:18:21.6 UTC
Last central line	2028 July 22 at 04:19:49.0 UTC
Last umbral external contact	2028 July 22 at 04:21:15.8 UTC
Last penumbral external contact	2028 July 22 at 05:24:22.4 UTC

July 22, 2028 solar eclipse parameters
Parameter	Value
Eclipse magnitude	1.05602
Eclipse obscuration	1.11518
Gamma	−0.60557
Sun right ascension	08h08m03.8s
Sun declination	+20°10'53.0"
Sun semi-diameter	15'44.5"
Sun equatorial horizontal parallax	08.7"
Moon right ascension	08h07m16.7s
Moon declination	+19°36'14.4"
Moon semi-diameter	16'24.3"
Moon equatorial horizontal parallax	1°00'12.3"
ΔT	73.2 s

== Characteristics ==
=== Eclipse path intersections ===
The path of the July 22, 2028 eclipse will be crossed by the paths of 3 more total solar eclipses within the following 10 years, including the November 2030, July 2037, and December 2038 total solar eclipses. The path of the July 2028 solar eclipse will intersect that of the November 2030 eclipse at a point between Thargomindah and Bourke in Eastern Australia, that of the July 2037 eclipse near Bedourjie, in southwestern Queensland, and that of the December 2038 eclipse at a point in the Tasman Sea, in between Australia and New Zealand. This is similar to the intersection in the paths of the August 2017 and April 2024 total solar eclipses in the United States, over southern Illinois, the intersection of the August 2027 and March 2034 total solar eclipses in Egypt, and the intersection of the August 1999 and March 2006 solar eclipses over Turkey; the intersections within these pairs of total eclipses occurred about 7 years apart. This phenomenon is considered to be unusual, since the average interval for any given spot on Earth to observe a total solar eclipse is about once every 375 years. The intersection patterns are caused by the dynamics of the Saros cycle.

== Impact ==
By August 2026 one hotel in Dunedin was already booked out for its 2028 "solar eclipse package", and 35,000 visitors were predicted to visit the city for the event. Dunedin was planning a winter night-sky festival, beginning with Matariki and ending with the eclipse ten days later.

== Eclipse season ==
This eclipse is part of an eclipse season, a period, roughly every six months, when eclipses occur. Only two (or occasionally three) eclipse seasons occur each year, and each season lasts about 35 days and repeats just short of six months (173 days) later; thus two full eclipse seasons always occur each year. Either two or three eclipses happen each eclipse season. In the sequence below, each eclipse is separated by a fortnight.

Eclipse season of July 2028
July 6 Ascending node (full moon)	July 22 Descending node (new moon)
Partial lunar eclipse Lunar Saros 120	Total solar eclipse Solar Saros 146

== Related eclipses ==
=== Eclipses in 2028 ===
- A partial lunar eclipse on January 12.
- An annular solar eclipse on January 26.
- A partial lunar eclipse on July 6.
- A total solar eclipse on July 22.
- A total lunar eclipse on December 31.

=== Metonic ===
- Preceded by: Solar eclipse of October 2, 2024
- Followed by: Solar eclipse of May 9, 2032

=== Tzolkinex ===
- Preceded by: Solar eclipse of June 10, 2021
- Followed by: Solar eclipse of September 2, 2035

=== Half-Saros ===
- Preceded by: Lunar eclipse of July 16, 2019
- Followed by: Lunar eclipse of July 27, 2037

=== Tritos ===
- Preceded by: Solar eclipse of August 21, 2017
- Followed by: Solar eclipse of June 21, 2039

=== Solar Saros 146 ===
- Preceded by: Solar eclipse of July 11, 2010
- Followed by: Solar eclipse of August 2, 2046

=== Inex ===
- Preceded by: Solar eclipse of August 11, 1999
- Followed by: Solar eclipse of July 1, 2057

=== Triad ===
- Preceded by: Solar eclipse of September 21, 1941
- Followed by: Solar eclipse of May 24, 2115

=== Solar eclipses of 2026–2029 ===
This eclipse is a member of a semester series. An eclipse in a semester series of solar eclipses repeats approximately every 177 days and 4 hours (a semester) at alternating nodes of the Moon's orbit.

The partial solar eclipses on June 12, 2029 and December 5, 2029 occur in the next lunar year eclipse set.

Solar eclipse series sets from 2026 to 2029
Ascending node			Descending node		
Saros	Map	Gamma	Saros	Map	Gamma
121	February 17, 2026 Annular	−0.97427	126 León, Spain	August 12, 2026 Total	0.89774
131	February 6, 2027 Annular	−0.29515	136	August 2, 2027 Total	0.14209
141	January 26, 2028 Annular	0.39014	146	July 22, 2028 Total	−0.60557
151	January 14, 2029 Partial	1.05532	156	July 11, 2029 Partial	−1.41908

=== Saros 146 ===
This eclipse is a part of Saros series 146, repeating every 18 years, 11 days, and containing 76 events. The series started with a partial solar eclipse on September 19, 1541. It contains total eclipses from May 29, 1938 through October 7, 2154; hybrid eclipses from October 17, 2172 through November 20, 2226; and annular eclipses from November 30, 2244 through August 10, 2659. The series ends at member 76 as a partial eclipse on December 29, 2893. Its eclipses are tabulated in three columns; every third eclipse in the same column is one exeligmos apart, so they all cast shadows over approximately the same parts of the Earth.

The longest duration of totality was produced by member 26 at 5 minutes, 21 seconds on June 30, 1992, and the longest duration of annularity will be produced by member 63 at 3 minutes, 30 seconds on August 10, 2659. All eclipses in this series occur at the Moon’s descending node of orbit.

Series members 16–37 occur between 1801 and 2200:
16	17	18
March 13, 1812	March 24, 1830	April 3, 1848
19	20	21
April 15, 1866	April 25, 1884	May 7, 1902
22	23	24
May 18, 1920	May 29, 1938	June 8, 1956
25	26	27
June 20, 1974	June 30, 1992	July 11, 2010
28	29	30
July 22, 2028	August 2, 2046	August 12, 2064
31	32	33
August 24, 2082	September 4, 2100	September 15, 2118
34	35	36
September 26, 2136	October 7, 2154	October 17, 2172
37
October 29, 2190

=== Metonic series ===
The metonic series repeats eclipses every 19 years (6939.69 days), lasting about 5 cycles. Eclipses occur in nearly the same calendar date. In addition, the octon subseries repeats 1/5 of that or every 3.8 years (1387.94 days). All eclipses in this table occur at the Moon's descending node.

21 eclipse events between July 22, 1971 and July 22, 2047
July 22	May 9–11	February 26–27	December 14–15	October 2–3
116	118	120	122	124
July 22, 1971	May 11, 1975	February 26, 1979	December 15, 1982	October 3, 1986
126	128	130	132	134
July 22, 1990	May 10, 1994	February 26, 1998	December 14, 2001	October 3, 2005
136	138	140	142	144
July 22, 2009	May 10, 2013	February 26, 2017	December 14, 2020	October 2, 2024
146	148	150	152	154
July 22, 2028	May 9, 2032	February 27, 2036	December 15, 2039	October 3, 2043
156
July 22, 2047

=== Tritos series ===
This eclipse is a part of a tritos cycle, repeating at alternating nodes every 135 synodic months (≈ 3986.63 days, or 11 years minus 1 month). Their appearance and longitude are irregular due to a lack of synchronization with the anomalistic month (period of perigee), but groupings of 3 tritos cycles (≈ 33 years minus 3 months) come close (≈ 434.044 anomalistic months), so eclipses are similar in these groupings.

Series members between 1801 and 2200
April 4, 1810 (Saros 126)	March 4, 1821 (Saros 127)	February 1, 1832 (Saros 128)	December 31, 1842 (Saros 129)	November 30, 1853 (Saros 130)
October 30, 1864 (Saros 131)	September 29, 1875 (Saros 132)	August 29, 1886 (Saros 133)	July 29, 1897 (Saros 134)	June 28, 1908 (Saros 135)
May 29, 1919 (Saros 136)	April 28, 1930 (Saros 137)	March 27, 1941 (Saros 138)	February 25, 1952 (Saros 139)	January 25, 1963 (Saros 140)
December 24, 1973 (Saros 141)	November 22, 1984 (Saros 142)	October 24, 1995 (Saros 143)	September 22, 2006 (Saros 144)	August 21, 2017 (Saros 145)
July 22, 2028 (Saros 146)	June 21, 2039 (Saros 147)	May 20, 2050 (Saros 148)	April 20, 2061 (Saros 149)	March 19, 2072 (Saros 150)
February 16, 2083 (Saros 151)	January 16, 2094 (Saros 152)	December 17, 2104 (Saros 153)	November 16, 2115 (Saros 154)	October 16, 2126 (Saros 155)
September 15, 2137 (Saros 156)	August 14, 2148 (Saros 157)	July 15, 2159 (Saros 158)	June 14, 2170 (Saros 159)	May 13, 2181 (Saros 160)
April 12, 2192 (Saros 161)

=== Inex series ===
This eclipse is a part of the long period inex cycle, repeating at alternating nodes, every 358 synodic months (≈ 10,571.95 days, or 29 years minus 20 days). Their appearance and longitude are irregular due to a lack of synchronization with the anomalistic month (period of perigee). However, groupings of 3 inex cycles (≈ 87 years minus 2 months) comes close (≈ 1,151.02 anomalistic months), so eclipses are similar in these groupings.

Series members between 1801 and 2200
December 9, 1825 (Saros 139)	November 20, 1854 (Saros 140)	October 30, 1883 (Saros 141)
October 10, 1912 (Saros 142)	September 21, 1941 (Saros 143)	August 31, 1970 (Saros 144)
August 11, 1999 (Saros 145)	July 22, 2028 (Saros 146)	July 1, 2057 (Saros 147)
June 11, 2086 (Saros 148)	May 24, 2115 (Saros 149)	May 3, 2144 (Saros 150)
April 12, 2173 (Saros 151)		

== See also ==
- List of solar eclipses in the 21st century
- Solar eclipse of April 8, 2024
- Solar eclipse of August 2, 2027
- Solar eclipse of November 25, 2030
- Solar eclipse of July 13, 2037
- Solar eclipse of December 26, 2038
