= Hungerford, Queensland =

Hungerford
- Town
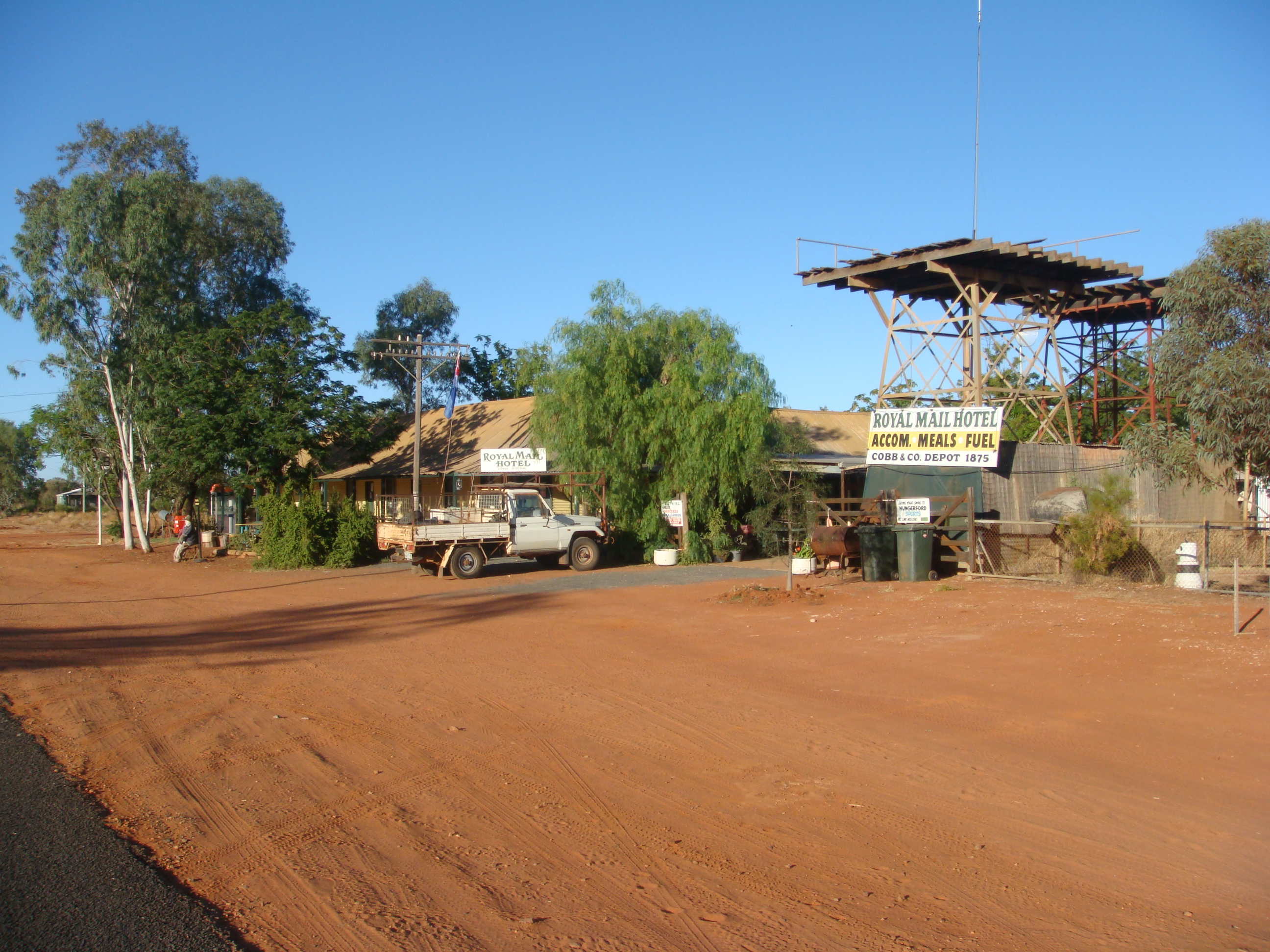
- The view around the Royal Mail Hotel

- Interactive map of Hungerford
- Coordinates: 28.9961°S 144.4080°E
- Country: Australia
- State: Queensland
- Region: South West Queensland
- LGAs: Shire of Bulloo; Shire of Paroo
- Location: 152 km (94 mi) SE of Thargomindah; 194 km (121 mi) SW of Cunnamulla; 214 km (133 mi) NW of Bourke; 985 km (612 mi) WSW of Brisbane

Government
  - State electorate: Warrego
  - Federal division: Maranoa

Area
  - Total: 6,690.5 km^{2} (2,583.2 sq mi)
- Elevation: 130 m (430 ft)

Population
  - Total: 19 (2021 census)
  - Density: 0.00284/km^{2} (0.00736/sq mi)
- Time zone: UTC+10:00 (AEST)
- Postcode: 4493
- County: Numalla County
Localities around Hungerford
Thargomindah	Thargomindah	Eulo
Bulloo Downs	Hungerford	Cuttaburra
Wanaaring (NSW)	Hungerford (NSW)	Yantabulla (NSW)

Hungerford is an outback town in the Shire of Bulloo and a locality in the Shire of Bulloo and Shire of Paroo, South West Queensland, Australia. The town and locality are on the Queensland border with New South Wales (which is also the Dingo fence).

In the 2021 census, the locality of Hungerford had a population of 19 people. The locality of Hungerford on the New South Wales side of the border had a population of 15.

Hungerford will be the site of a total solar eclipse on 22 July 2028.

== Geography ==
The locality is split between the Shire of Bulloo (western part) and the Shire of Paroo (eastern part). The town is located in the Shire of Bulloo immediately north of the border between Queensland and New South Wales.

The intermittent Paroo River enters the locality from the north-east (Eulo) and flows in a south-westerly direction through the locality, passing immediately west of the border town of Hungerford before crossing into New South Wales as part of the Murray Darling basin.

Currawinya National Park is in the north, north-east, centre, and south of the locality, extending north into neighbouring Thargomindah. Apart from this protected area, the land use is predominantly grazing on native vegetation.

== History ==
Hungerford was in Badjiri territory.

The town is named after Thomas Hungerford who once camped at the site. The town developed from a border customs post on a stock route alongside the Paroo River. In 1874, the first hotel opened and the following year the town was gazetted. For a number of years, before a proper survey was conducted the town was thought to be located in New South Wales.

Hungerford Post Office opened on 1 October 1880, was replaced by a New South Wales office in 1881, reopened in 1886 and closed by 1907, replaced the New South Wales office in 1941 and closed by 1985.

In 1892–3, Henry Lawson visited the town and wrote a short story named after it. In the story he wrote:

The town is right on the Queensland border, and an inter-provincial rabbit-proof fence -- with rabbits on both sides of it -- runs across the main street. ...
Hungerford consists of two houses and a humpy in New South Wales, and five houses in Queensland. Characteristically enough, both the pubs are in Queensland. We got a glass of sour yeast at one and paid six pence for it -- we had asked for English ale.

A Cobb & Co coach service to the town was stopped in 1904.

Hungerford Provisional School opened in 1892, becoming Hungerford State School in 1909. It closed in 1918, due to low attendance. It reopened in 1928, but low attendances caused it to close again in 1930. The school was on a 5-acre (2.0 ha) site bounded by Arcturus Street, Achernar Street, Aldebran Street and Canopus Street (28.9934°S 144.4107°E). The school was reopened one final time in the Bulloo Shire Hall between 30 January and 11 December 1981.

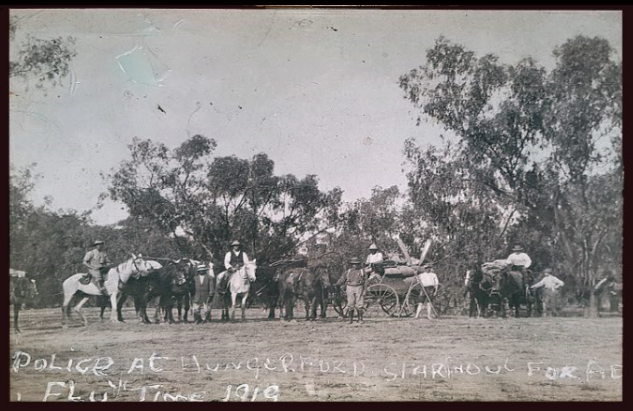
Charleville Police keeping the border closed at Hungerford during the Spanish flu pandemic, 1919

In 1919 during the Spanish flu pandemic, Queensland Police were dispatched from Charleville to Hungerford to close the border at Hungerford, to prevent people crossing into Queensland from New South Wales to reduce the spread of the flu. A medical screening process was used to determine if Queensland residents could safely return to the state.

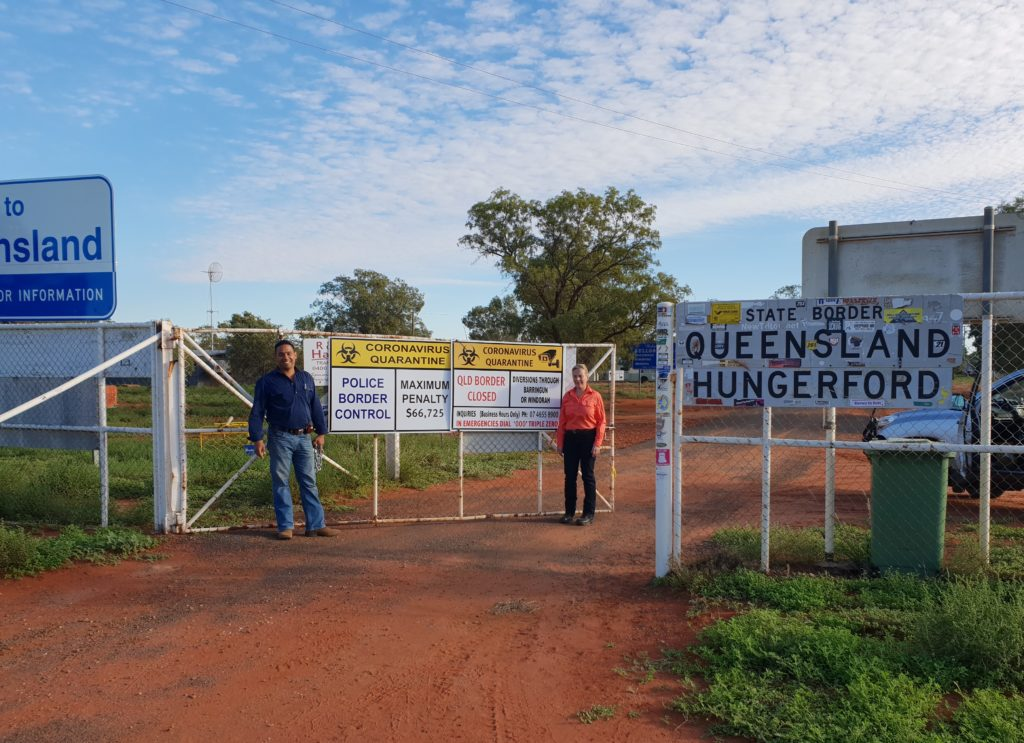
Charleville Police keeping the border closed at Hungerford during the COVID-19 pandemic, 2020

During 2020 and 2021 in response to the COVID-19 pandemic, Queensland Police again closed the border at Achenar Street at Hungerford to prevent movement of people between the two states.

== Demographics ==
In the 2016 census, Hungerford had a population of 23 people. The locality of Hungerford on the New South Wales side of the border had a population of 15.

In the 2021 census, the locality of Hungerford had a population of 19 people.

== Heritage listings ==
Hungerford has a number of heritage-listed sites, including:

- Royal Mail Hotel, Archernar Street (28.9976°S 144.4091°E)

== Education ==
There are no schools in Hungerford nor nearby. The alternatives are distance education and boarding school.

== Economy ==
There are a number of homesteads in the locality:

- Boorara (28.6579°S 144.3803°E)
- Corina (28.4670°S 144.5788°E)
- Currawinya (28.8376°S 144.4944°E)
- Granite Springs (28.3407°S 144.5584°E)
- Karto (28.9118°S 144.0640°E)
- Moombidary (28.9316°S 143.8971°E)
- Werewilka (28.3333°S 144.3890°E)

== Facilities ==
Hungerford Aerodrome is operated by the Bulloo Shire Council. It is to the east on the town on the Hungerford Airstrip Road (28.9965°S 144.4525°E). There is one sealed runway 1,100-metre (3,600 ft) long. It has no lighting but portable lights and flairs can be used in emergencies.

== Attractions ==
Walters Range Lookout is off the Old Thargominda Hungerford Road (28.6257°S 144.3359°E).
