= Burke and Wills expedition =

Australian exploration expedition (1860–61)

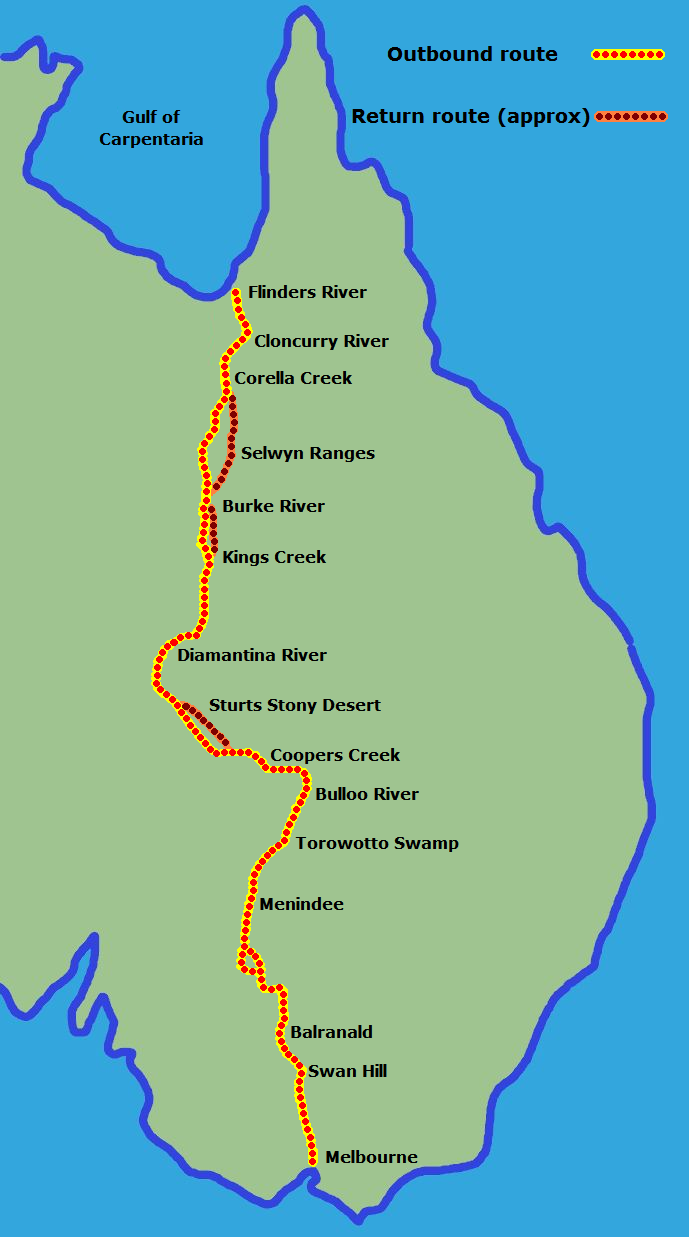
Map of the Burke and Wills expedition

The Burke and Wills expedition, originally called the Victorian Exploring Expedition, was an exploration expedition organised by the Royal Society of Victoria (RSV) in Australia in 1860–61.

The exploration party initially consisted of nineteen men led by Robert O'Hara Burke, with William John Wills being a deputy commander. Its objective was the crossing of Australia from Melbourne in the south to the Gulf of Carpentaria in the north, a distance of around 3,250 kilometres (approximately 2,000 miles). At that time most of the inland of Australia had not been explored by non-Indigenous people and was largely unknown to European settlers.

The expedition left Melbourne in winter. Very bad weather, poor roads and broken-down horse wagons meant they made slow progress at first. After dividing the party at Menindee on the Darling River, Burke made good progress, reaching Cooper Creek at the beginning of summer. The expedition established a depot camp at Cooper Creek, and Burke, Wills and two other men pushed on to the north coast (although dense swampland stopped them from reaching the northern coastline).

The return journey was plagued by delays and monsoon rains, and when Burke's party reached the depot at Cooper Creek, they found it had been abandoned just hours earlier. Burke and Wills died on or about 30 June 1861. Several relief expeditions were sent out, all contributing new geographical findings. Altogether, seven men died, and only one man, the Irish soldier John King, crossed the continent with the expedition and returned alive to Melbourne.

== Background ==
In 1851, gold was discovered in what was then the Colony of Victoria. The subsequent gold rush led to a huge influx of migrants, with the local population increasing from 29,000 in 1851 to 139,916 in 1861 (Sydney had 93,686 at the time). As a result, Melbourne rapidly grew to become Australia's largest city and the second largest city of the British Empire. The boom lasted forty years and ushered in the era known as "marvellous Melbourne".

The influx of educated gold seekers from England, Ireland and Germany led to rapid growth of schools, churches, learned societies, libraries and art galleries. The University of Melbourne was founded in 1855 and the State Library of Victoria in 1856. The Philosophical Institute of Victoria was founded in 1854 and became the Royal Society of Victoria (RSV) after receiving a Royal Charter in 1859.

By 1855 there was speculation about possible routes for the Australian Overland Telegraph Line to connect Australia to the new telegraph cable in Java, then part of the Dutch East Indies, and then Europe. There was fierce competition between the colonies over the hypothetical route, with governments recognising the economic benefits that would result from becoming the centre of the telegraph network. A number of routes were considered including Ceylon to Albany in Western Australia, or Java to the north coast of Australia and then either onto east coast, or south through the centre of the continent to Adelaide. The Government of Victoria organised the Burke and Wills expedition to cross the continent in 1860. The Government of South Australia offered a reward of £2000 to encourage an expedition to find a route between South Australia and the north coast.

== Exploration Committee ==
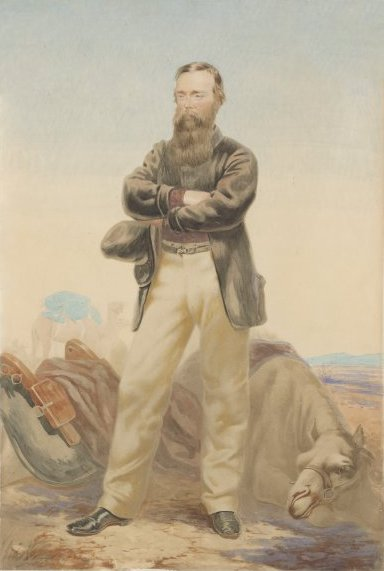
Robert O'Hara Burke by William Strutt

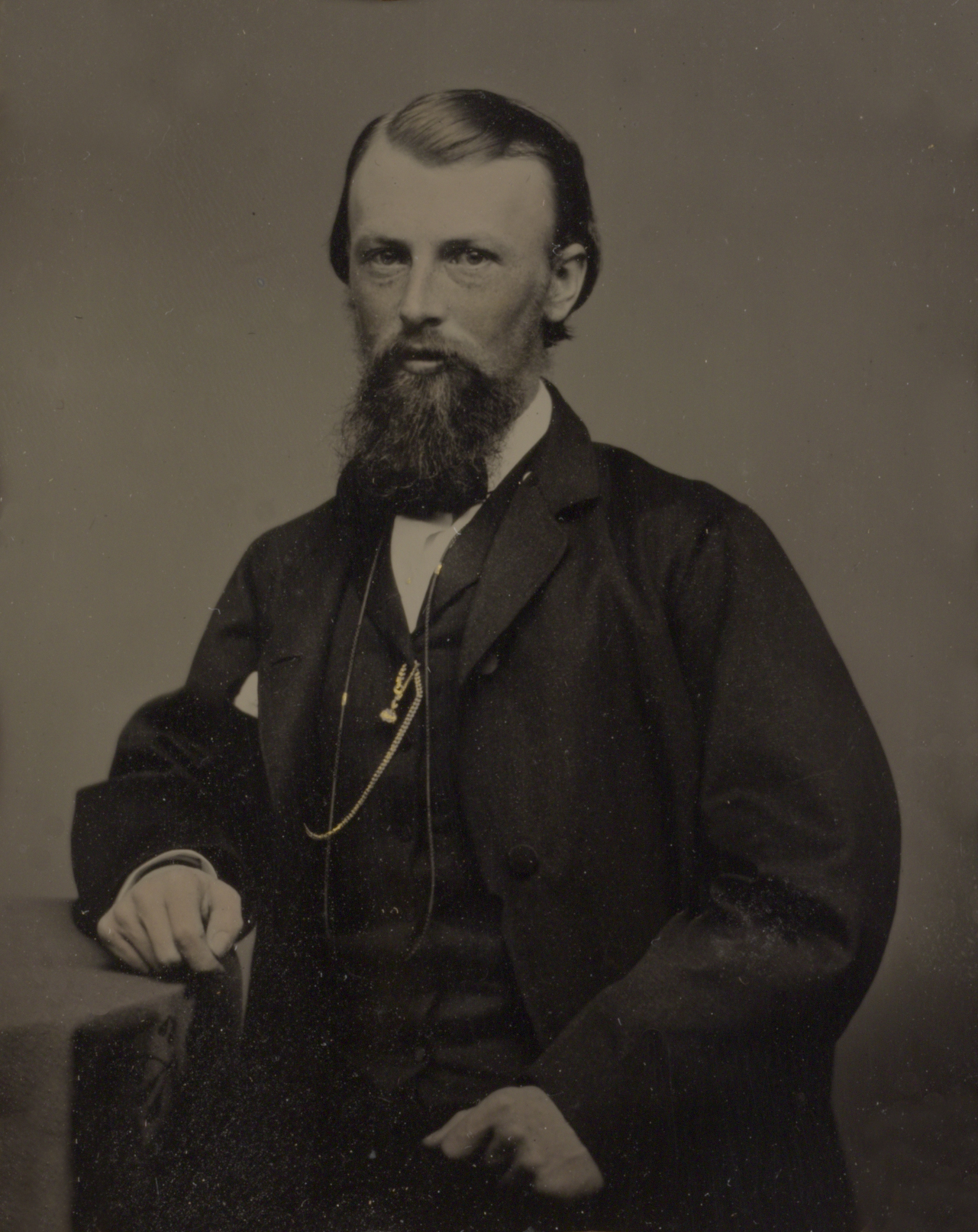
William John Wills

In 1857 the Philosophical Institute formed an Exploration Committee with the aim of investigating the practicability of fitting out an expedition of the Australian interior. While interest in inland exploration was strong in the neighbouring colonies of New South Wales and South Australia, in Victoria enthusiasm was limited. Even the anonymous donation of £1,000 (later discovered to be from Ambrose Kyte) to the Fund Raising Committee of the RSV failed to generate much interest and it wasn't until 1860 that sufficient money was raised and the expedition was assembled.

The Exploration Committee called for offers of interest for a leader for the Victorian Exploring Expedition. Only two members of the committee, Ferdinand von Mueller and Wilhelm Blandowski, had any experience in exploration. However, due to factionalism, both men were consistently outvoted. Several people were considered for the post of leader and the RSV held a range of meetings in early 1860. Robert O'Hara Burke was selected by committee ballot as the leader, and William John Wills was recommended as surveyor, navigator and third-in-command. Burke made for an unusual choice as he had no experience in exploration; he was an Irish-born ex-officer with the colonial forces, and later became police superintendent with virtually no skills in bushcraft. Wills was more adept than Burke at living in the wilderness, but it was Burke's leadership skills (or lack thereof) that were especially detrimental to the mission.

Rather than take cattle to be slaughtered during the trip, the Exploration Committee decided to experiment with dried meat. The weight required three extra wagons and slowed the expedition down appreciably.

=== Instructions from the Exploration Committee ===
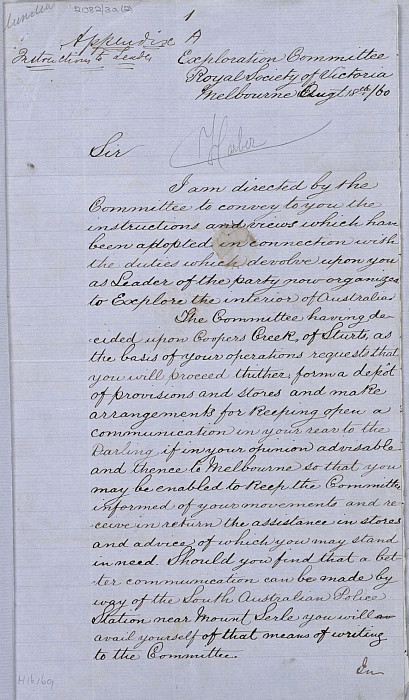
Instructions issued to Burke, leader of the Victorian Exploration Expedition

The Exploration Committee gave Burke written instructions. These included suggestions for the expedition's route, but also gave Burke discretion depending on conditions and barriers he might encounter. The instructions were signed by the Honorary Secretary Dr John Macadam and in part advised:

"The object of the Committee in directing you to Coopers Creek is that you should explore the country intervening between it and Ludwig Leichhardt's track south of the Gulf of Carpentaria avoiding as far as practicable Sturt's route on the west and Gregory's down the Victoria on the east….. should you determine the impracticability of this route you are desired to turn westward into the country recently discovered by Stuart and connect his furthest point north with Gregory's furthest southern exploration in 1856.....

The Committee is fully aware of the difficulty of the Country you are called on to traverse and in giving you these instructions has placed these routes before you more as an indication of what it has been deemed desirable to have accomplished than as indicating an exact course for you to pursue.

The Committee entrusts you with the largest discretion as regards the forming of depots, and your movements generally….

=== Members of the Exploration Committee ===
The Exploration Committee of the Royal Society of Victoria included:

- Sir William Foster Stawell, Chief Justice of Victoria
- Dr David Elliott Wilkie MD., Treasurer
- Dr John Macadam, Honorary Secretary
- Professor Georg Neumayer
- Dr Ferdinand von Mueller, government botanist
- Sir Frederick McCoy, Melbourne University's first professor
- The Hon. Captain Andrew Clarke
- Dr Richard Eades, Mayor of Melbourne
- Charles Ligar, Government Surveyor General
- The Hon Sir Francis Murphy, Speaker of the Legislative Assembly
- Lieutenant John Randall Pascoe, JP
- Captain Francis Cadell
- Alfred Selwyn Esq., government geologist
- Reverend Father Dr John Ignatius Bleasdale
- Clement Hodgkinson Esq.
- Dr J William McKenna
- Edward Wilson, editor of The Argus
- Dr William Gilbee
- Sizar Elliott Esq.
- Dr Solomon Iffla
- Angus McMillan Esq.
- James Smith Esq.
- John Watson Esq.

== Camels ==
Camels had been used successfully in desert exploration in other parts of the world, but by 1859 only seven camels had been imported into Australia. The Victorian government appointed George James Landells to purchase twenty-four camels in India for use in desert exploration. The animals arrived in Melbourne in June 1860, and the Exploration Committee purchased an additional six from George Coppin's Cremorne Gardens. The camels were initially housed in the stables at Parliament House and later moved to Royal Park. Twenty-six camels were taken on the expedition, with six (two females with their two young calves and two males) being left in Royal Park.

== Departure from Melbourne ==
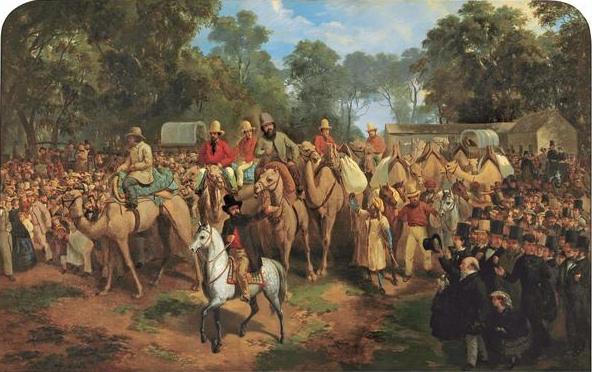
Nicholas Chevalier, Memorandum of the Start of the Exploring Expedition, oil on canvas, 1860

The Burke and Wills expedition set off from Royal Park at about 4pm on 20 August 1860, watched by around 15,000 spectators. The nineteen men of the expedition included six Irishmen, five Englishmen, three Germans, an American, and four camel drivers from the Indian subcontinent. They took twenty-three horses, six wagons and twenty-six camels.

The members of the expedition at the time of departure were:

- Robert O'Hara Burke (leader)
- George James Landells (1825–1871) (second in command, charge of camels)
- William John Wills (third in command, surveyor and astronomical observer)
- Hermann Beckler (medical officer and botanist)
- Ludwig Becker (artist, naturalist and geologist)
- Charles Ferguson (1832–1925) (foreman)
- Thomas Francis McDonough (1834–1904) (assistant)
- William Patton (?–1861) (assistant)
- Patrick Langan (assistant)
- William Brahe (1835–1912) (assistant)
- John King (assistant)
- John Drakeford (assistant)
- James McIlwaine (1834–?) (assistant)
- Patrick Langan (assistant)
- Thomas Brooks (assistant)
- Samla (camel driver, a Hindu from India)
- Esau Khan (camel driver, a Muslim from Kalat)
- Dost Mahomet (camel driver, a Muslim from Ghazni)
- Belooch Khan (camel driver, a Parsi from Kanpur)

The expedition took a large amount of equipment, including enough food to last two years, a cedar-topped oak camp table with two chairs, pocket charcoal water filters, rifles, revolvers, rockets, flags and a Chinese gong; the equipment all together weighed as much as twenty tonnes.

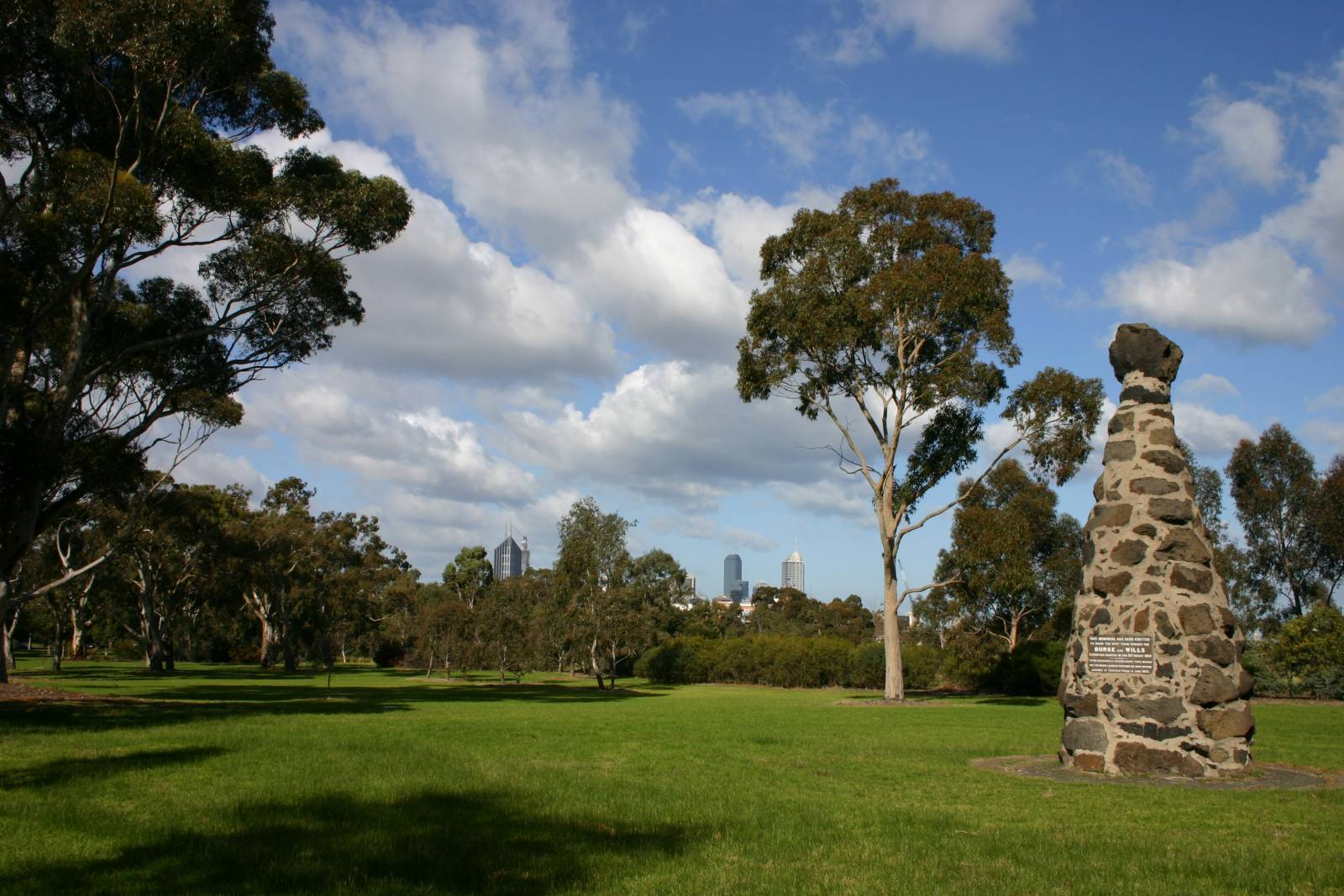
Monument in Royal Park, Melbourne where the expedition commenced

Committee member Captain Francis Cadell had offered to transport the equipment from Adelaide up the Murray River to the junction with the Darling River to be collected on the way. However, Burke declined his offer, possibly because Cadell had opposed Burke's appointment as leader of the expedition. Instead, all of the supplies were loaded onto six wagons. One wagon broke down before it had even left Royal Park and by midnight of the first day the expedition had reached only Essendon, on the edge of Melbourne. There, two more wagons broke down. Heavy rains and bad roads made travelling through Victoria difficult and time-consuming. The party arrived at Lancefield on 23 August and set up their fourth camp. The first day off was taken on Sunday 26 August at Camp VI in Mia Mia.

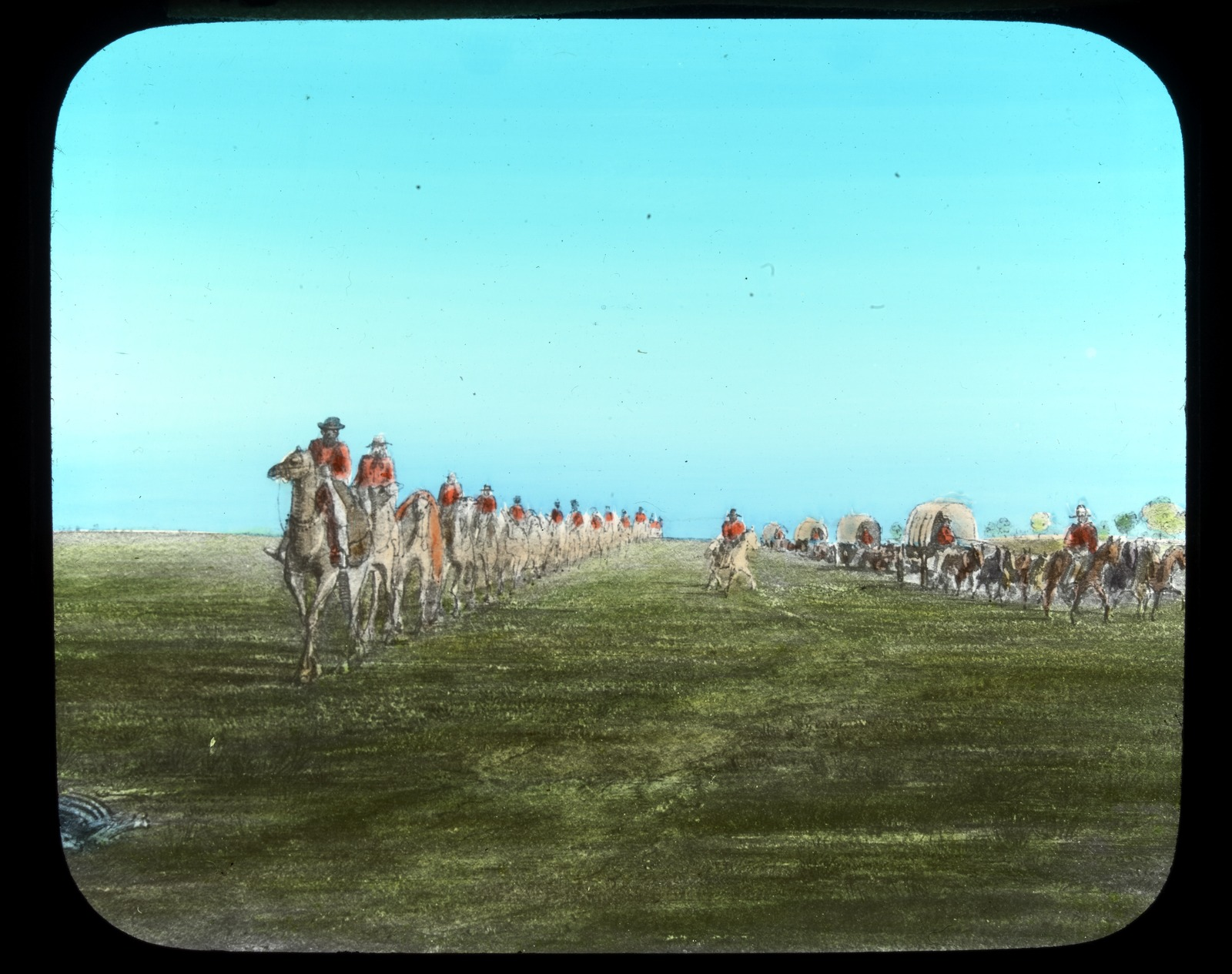
Crossing the Terrick-Terrick Plains by Ludwig Becker, who died on the journey

The expedition reached Swan Hill on 6 September, where Charles Gray joined the expedition. They arrived in Balranald on 15 September. There, to lighten the load, the expedition left behind their sugar, lime juice and some of their guns and ammunition. Burke also dismissed several members of the expedition here, including the foreman Charles Ferguson, citing lack of funds. Ferguson later successfully sued for unfair dismissal. At Gambala on 24 September, Burke decided to load some of the provisions onto the camels for the first time, and to lessen the burden on the horses he ordered the men to walk. He also ordered that personal luggage be restricted to 30 lb (14 kg).

At Bilbarka on the Darling, Burke and his second-in-command, Landells, argued after Burke decided to dump the 60 gallons (≈270 litres) of rum that Landells had brought to feed to the camels in the belief that it prevented scurvy. At Kinchega on the Darling, Landells resigned from the expedition, followed by the expedition's surgeon, Dr Hermann Beckler. Third-in-command Wills was promoted to second-in-command. They reached Menindee on 12 October, having taken two months to travel 750 km (470 mi) from Melbourne—the regular mail coach did the journey in little more than a week. By this time two of the expedition's five officers had resigned, thirteen members had been fired and eight new men had been hired.

== Menindee to Cooper Creek ==
In July 1859 the South Australian government offered a reward of £2,000 (about A$243,800 in 2023 dollars) for the first successful south–north crossing of the continent west of the 143rd line of longitude. The experienced explorer John McDouall Stuart had taken up the challenge. Burke was concerned Stuart might beat him to the north coast and he soon grew impatient with the expedition's slow progress, often averaging only 2 mi (3.2 km) an hour.

Burke therefore split the group, taking fifteen horses, sixteen camels and the seven fittest men; Wills, Brahe, Patton, McDonough, King, Gray and Dost Mahomet. He also reduced the amount of equipment, with plans to push on quickly to Cooper Creek (then known as Cooper's Creek) and then wait for the others left behind at Menindee to catch up. They departed Menindee on 19 October, guided by a Paakantyi man named Dick Barkinji, William Wright (the manager of the nearby Kinchega sheep station) and another local Aboriginal man. Wright was appointed third-in-command and travel was relatively easy because recent rain made water abundant, and the unusually mild weather temperatures exceeded 90 °F (32 °C) only twice. Wright and Barkinji had also travelled the same way near to Cooper Creek a few months beforehand.

Burke's party journeyed via waterholes at Bilpa, Langawirra, Mutawintiji and Wannaminta to the swamp at Torowotto. At Torowotto, Wright, Barkinji and the other Aboriginal guide were sent back to Menindee to bring up the remainder of the men and supplies, while Burke's party continued on to Cooper Creek. Aboriginal people living at Torowotto told them they would meet with opposition from the inhabitants further north.

Guided by another two Aboriginal men, Burke's party soon reached Lake Altiboulka (Altoka) and then travelled through the Caryapundy floodplains to the Bulloo River, which was also known as Wright's Creek. At the Bulloo, they encountered around 120 Aboriginal residents and at times used their pathways to make their way to Cooper Creek, which they arrived at on 11 November.

== Cooper Creek ==
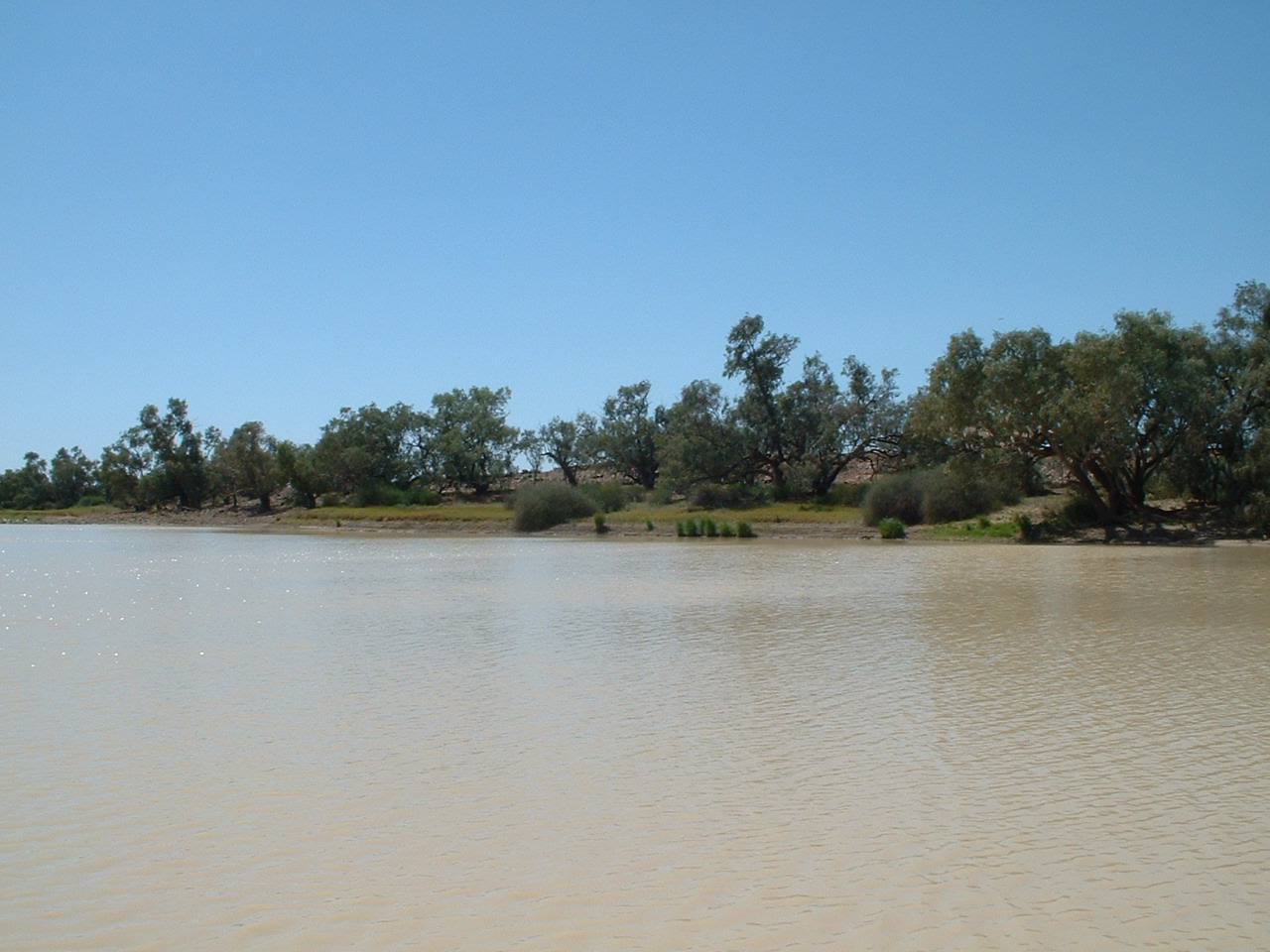
Site of Camp 65 on Cooper Creek

In 1860, Cooper Creek was the outer limit of the land that had been explored by Europeans, the river having been visited by Captain Charles Sturt in 1845 and Augustus Charles Gregory in 1858. Burke's party arrived at the Cooper on 11 November and they formed a depot at Camp LXIII (Camp 63). While conducting a ninety-mile reconnaissance to the north of this camp, Wills lost three camels and had to walk back to the depot. A plague of rats forced the men to move camp, so they formed a second depot further downstream at a waterhole. This was Camp LXV (Camp 65), where they erected a stockade which they named Fort Wills.

It was thought that Burke would wait at Cooper Creek until autumn (March the next year) so that they would avoid having to travel during the hot Australian summer. However, Burke waited only until 16 December before deciding to make a dash for the Gulf of Carpentaria. He split the group again, leaving Brahe in charge of the depot, with Dost Mahomet, Patton and McDonough.

Burke, Wills, King and Gray set off for the Gulf with six camels, one horse and enough food for just three months. By now it was mid-summer and the daily temperature often reached 122 °F (50 °C) in the shade, and in the Strzelecki and Sturt Stony Deserts there was very little shade to be found. Brahe was ordered by Burke to wait for three months; however, the more conservative Wills had reviewed the maps and developed a more realistic view of the task ahead, and secretly instructed Brahe to wait for four months.

== Gulf of Carpentaria ==
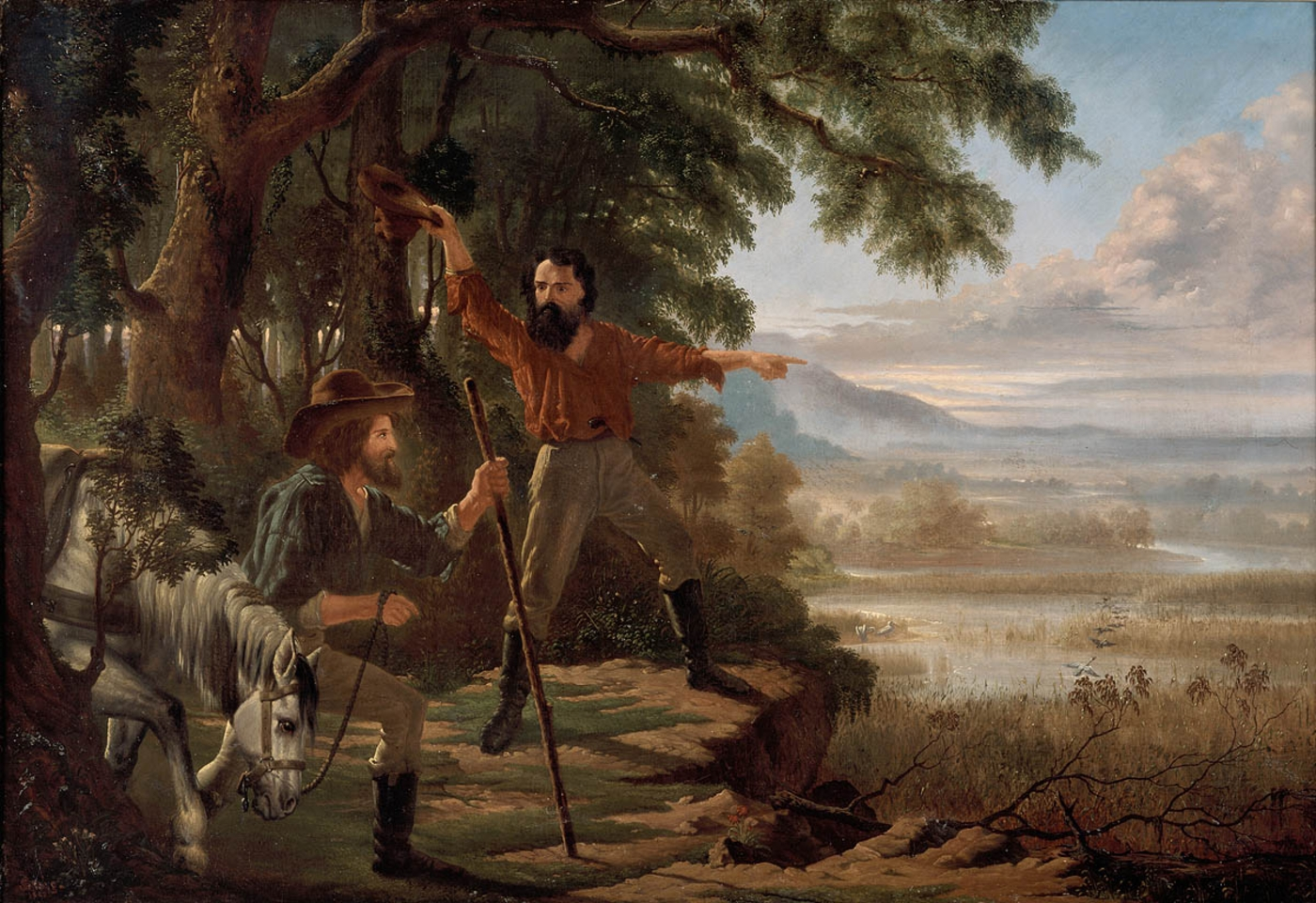
Edward Jukes Greig, Arrival of Burke & Wills at Flinders River, oil on canvas, 1862, State Library of New South Wales

The journey north to the Gulf of Carpentaria went smoothly, with recent rains making water easy to find and the Aboriginal people, contrary to expectations, were peaceful. Around 2 February 1861, the group formed Camp CXIX (Camp 119) on the banks of the Bynoe River, an arm of the Flinders River delta, which Wills had noticed to be salty and tidal. Knowing that the sea must be close, but with the ground being boggy, Burke and Wills decided to leave the camels behind with King and Gray at Camp 119 and set off through the swamps to the coast. They followed a path which led to an Aboriginal community with a yam-field and a very large hut. Some of the resident Kukatj men pointed them in the best direction. It is assumed that on 11 February 1861 they may have reached or viewed the shores of the Gulf, but there is no documentary evidence of this. By this stage, they were desperately short of supplies. They had food left for twenty-seven days, but it had already taken them fifty-nine days to travel from Cooper Creek. Burke and Wills rejoined the others at Camp 119 and started the return journey on 13 February.

== Return journey to Cooper Creek ==
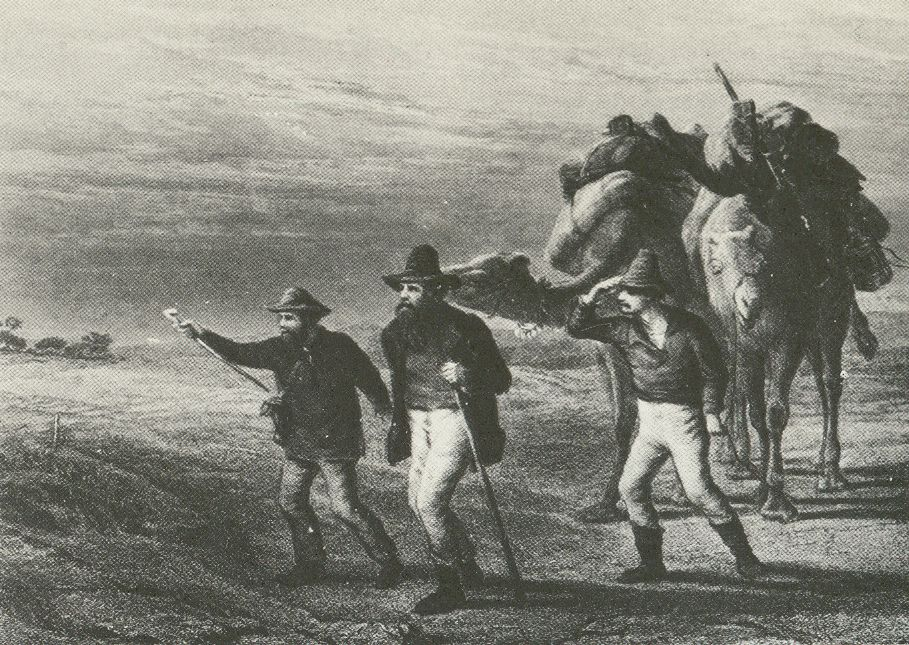
The return journey

On the way back, the wet season broke and the tropical monsoonal rains began. A camel named Golah Sing was abandoned on 4 March when it was unable to continue. Three other camels were shot and eaten along the way and they shot their only horse, Billy, on 10 April on the Diamantina River, south of what is today the town of Birdsville. Equipment was abandoned at a number of locations as the number of pack animals was reduced. One of these locations, Return Camp 32, was relocated in 1994; the Burke and Wills Historical Society mounted an expedition to verify the discovery of camel bones in 2005.

To extend their food supply, Burke's party ate portulaca, a flowering plant. Gray also caught an 11 lb (5.0 kg) python (probably Aspidites melanocephalus, a black-headed python), which they ate. Both Burke and Gray immediately came down with dysentery. Gray was ill, but Burke thought he was "gammoning" (pretending). On 25 March on the Burke River (just south of what is now the town of Boulia), Gray was caught stealing skilligolee (a type of watery porridge) and Burke beat him. By 8 April, Gray could not walk; he died on 17 April of dysentery at a place they called Polygonum Swamp. The location of his death is unknown, although it is generally believed to be Lake Massacre in South Australia. While the possibility that Burke killed Gray has been discounted, the severity of the beating Burke gave has been widely debated. The three surviving men stopped for a day to bury Gray, and to recover their strength – they were by this stage very weak from hunger and exhaustion. They finally reached Cooper Creek on 21 April, only to find that the depot in charge of Brahe had been abandoned several hours earlier.

== Actions of Brahe and Wright ==
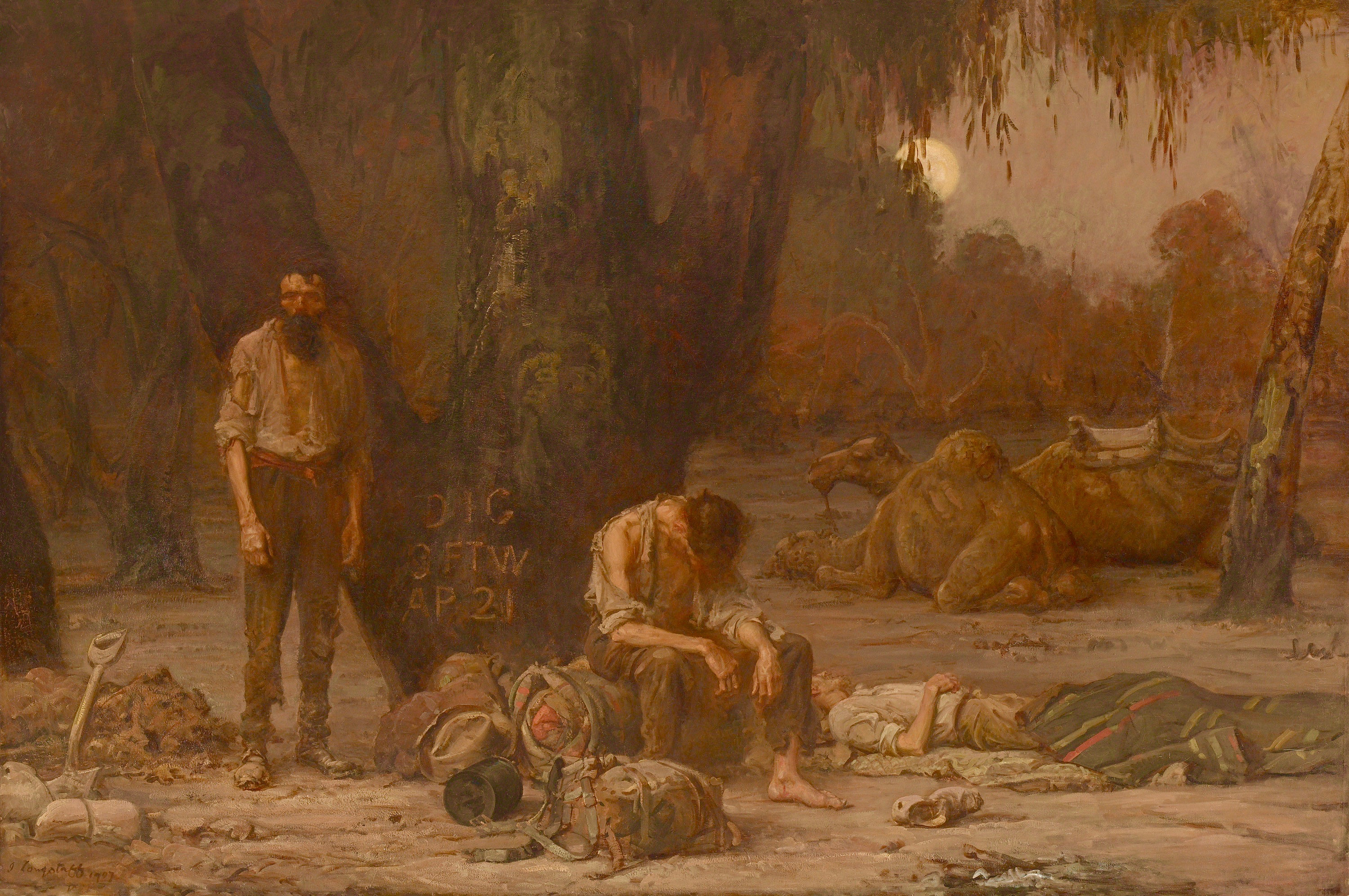
John Longstaff, Arrival of Burke, Wills and King at the deserted camp at Cooper's Creek, Sunday evening, 21 April 1861

Burke had asked Brahe and the depot party to remain at the camp on the Cooper for thirteen weeks. The party had actually waited for eighteen weeks and was running low on supplies and starting to feel the effects of scurvy; they had come to believe that Burke would never return from the Gulf. After one of the men at the depot, Patton, had injured his leg from being thrown off a horse, Brahe decided to return to Menindee. Before leaving he buried some provisions in case Burke did return, carving a message on a tree to mark the spot.

=== The Dig Tree ===
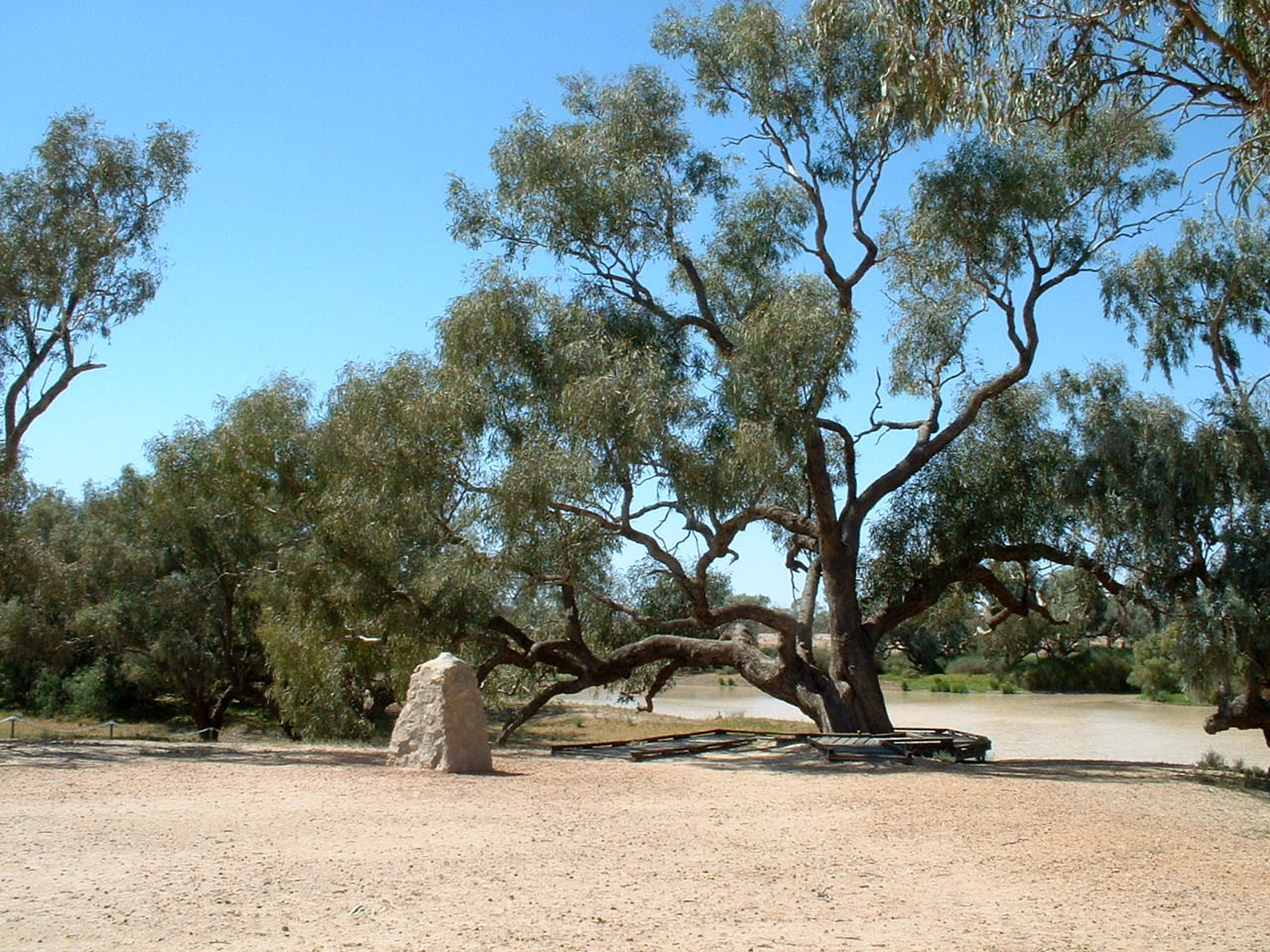
The Dig Tree on Cooper Creek

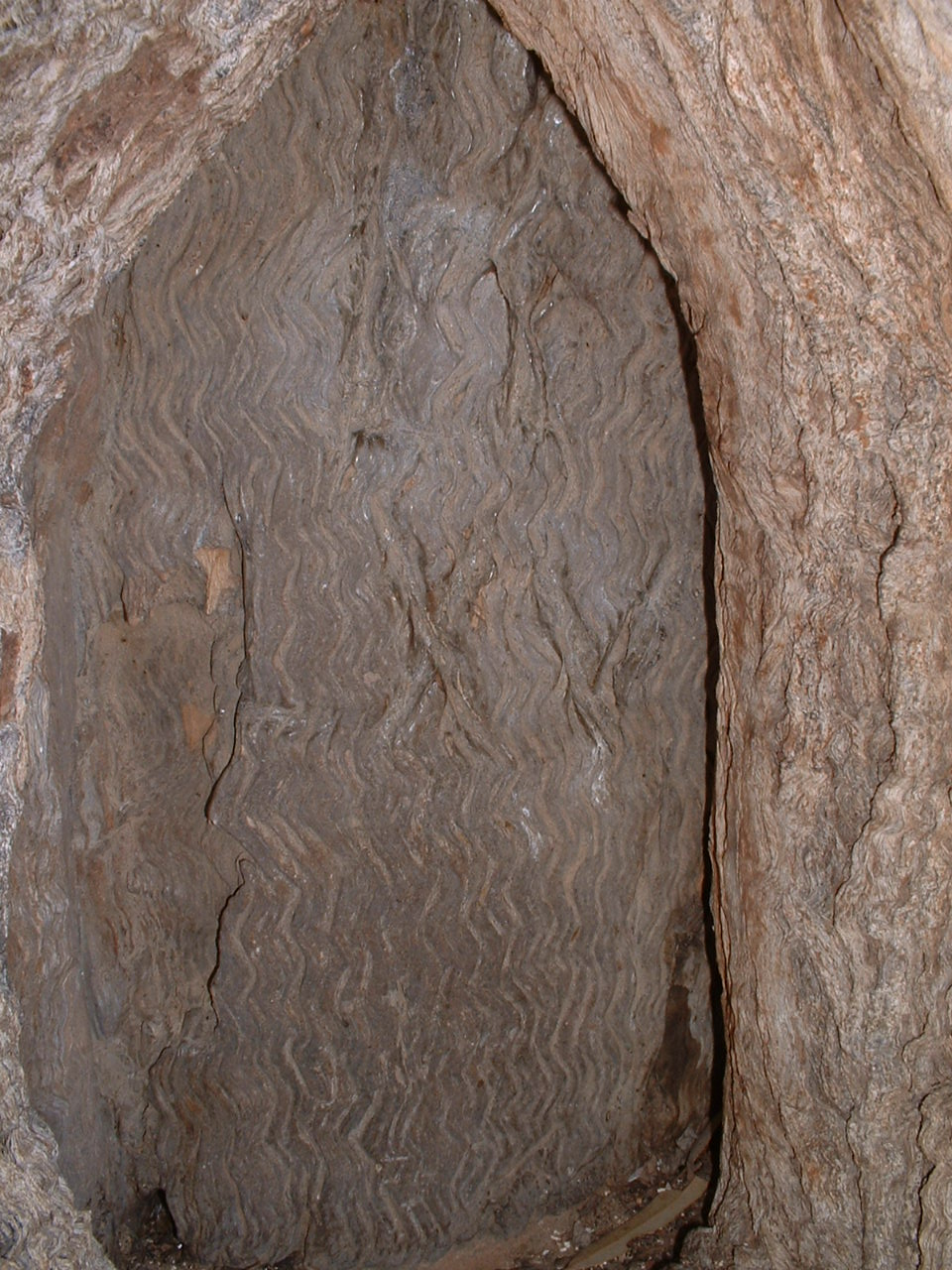
The camp blaze, B LXV on the Dig Tree

Brahe blazed two trees (27.623902°S 141.075784°E) at Camp 65. Located on the banks of Cooper Creek, both are coolibahs (Eucalyptus coolabah formerly Eucalyptus microtheca) and both are estimated to be at least 250 years old. One tree has two blazes on it; one denoting the date of arrival and the date of departure "DEC-6-60" carved over "APR-21-61" and the other showing the initial "B" (for Burke) carved over the Roman numerals for (camp) 65; "B" over "LXV". The date blaze has grown closed and only the camp number blaze remains visible today. On an adjacent smaller tree, Brahe carved the instruction to "DIG". The exact inscription is not known, but is variously recalled to be "DIG", "DIG under", "DIG 3 FT N.W.", "DIG 3FT N.E." or "DIG 21 APR 61".

Initially the tree with the Date and Camp Number blaze was known as "Brahe's Tree" or the "Depot Tree", and the tree under which Burke died attracted most attention and interest. However, the tree at Camp 65 became known as the "Dig Tree" from at least 1912.

In 1899, John Dick carved a likeness of Burke's face in a nearby tree along with his initials, his wife's initials and the date.

=== Wright's journey ===
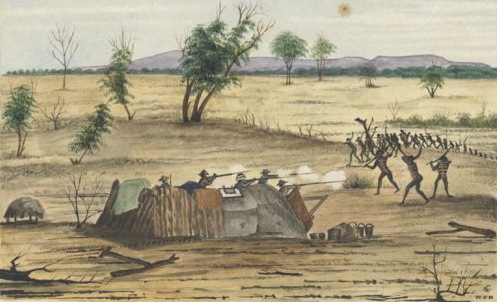
William Hodgkinson, Bulla, Queensland, watercolour, 1861. Hodgkinson briefly joined the expedition at Swan Hill, and was a member of two relief expeditions. Bulla depicts the skirmish between William Wright's group and Aboriginal people at the Bulloo River.

Meanwhile, the mission led by Wright to bring the supplies and men up to Camp 65 was having terrible problems. Wright's group had only departed Menindee at the end of January 1861 and made very slow progress due to hot weather and a lack of water availability. They arrived at the Bulloo River in early April with several men in poor health. Wright camped at a large lagoon populated with Galali people, who had made several 'ingeniously constructed fishing dams' nearby. The Galali made demonstrations for Wright's group to get off their campsite, and Wright built a stockade for protection.

For the rest of April, Wright was stuck at the lagoon, unable to move due to his sick men. Eventually three of the men, Dr Ludwig Becker, Charles Stone and William Purcell, died. Toward the end of the month, a large group of Galali tried to take down the stockade, with Wright's group firing upon and dispersing them. A member of Wright's party, William Hodgkinson, later produced a painting of this skirmish.

=== Brahe joins up with Wright ===
On 29 April, Brahe's group arrived at the Bulloo River after abandoning Camp 65 eight days previously. They united with Wright's group and started to head back to Menindee to try and save their remaining men. However, Wright and Brahe decided to make one last quick excursion to Camp 65 to see if Burke had returned. When the two men arrived on 8 May, Burke had already left for Mount Hopeless, and the Cooper Creek depot was again deserted. Burke and Wills were 35 miles (56 km) away by this point. As the mark and date on the tree were unaltered, Brahe and Wright assumed that Burke had not returned, and did not think to check whether the supplies were still buried. They left to rejoin the main party and return to Menindee.

== Burke, Wills and King at Cooper Creek ==
Burke, Wills and King arrived at Camp 65 in the evening of Sunday, 21 April 1861, finding the Cooper Creek depot deserted after Brahe's group had left earlier that day. They found the "Dig Tree" and dug up the cache of supplies together with Brahe's letter explaining that the party had given up waiting and left. Burke's party had missed them by only nine hours. The three men and two remaining camels were exhausted; they had no hope of catching up to Brahe's party.

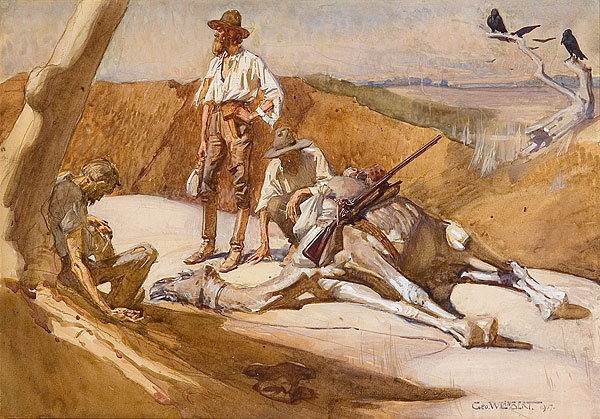
George Washington Lambert, Burke and Wills on the way to Mount Hopeless, watercolour, 1907

Burke's party rested at Camp 65 for two days, living off the supplies left in the cache. Wills and King wanted to follow their outward track back to Menindee, but Burke overruled them and decided to attempt to reach the furthest outpost of pastoral settlement in South Australia, a cattle station near Mount Hopeless. This would mean travelling southwest through the desert for 240 kilometres (150 mi). They wrote a letter explaining their intentions and reburied it in the cache under the marked tree in case a rescue party visited the area. Unfortunately, they did not change the mark on the tree or alter the date. On 23 April they set off, following Cooper Creek downstream and then heading out into the Strzelecki Desert towards Mount Hopeless.

After leaving the "Dig Tree", Burke's party rarely travelled more than 5 mi (8.0 km) a day, mostly following paths used by the local Aboriginal residents. The region was well populated with Yandruwandha people and they were very courteous to the three explorers, giving them fish, beans called padlu and a type of damper made from the ground sporocarps of the ngardu (nardoo) plant (Marsilea drummondii) in exchange for sugar. One of the two remaining camels, Landa, was shot when he became bogged in Minkie waterhole and the other, Rajah, later collapsed on 7 May. Without pack animals, it became impossible for Burke, Wills and King to leave Cooper Creek and cross the Strzelecki Desert.

Over the next few days, the party encountered several Yandruwandha communities who gave them a variety of cooked foods, including fish, nardoo, native rats and padlu. They were also given gunyahs to sleep in and the stimulant pituri to chew. Some Yandruwandha even stayed attentive to their fire at night so the explorers wouldn't get cold. However, by 10 May these Yandruwandha moved elsewhere, forcing the three men to fend for themselves. They were unable to locate other Aboriginal camps and had to make do for the next two weeks camping next to a nardoo patch, preparing this food themselves.

At the end of May 1861, Burke ordered Wills to return to the "Dig Tree" to deposit some items for safekeeping. During this trip, Wills met with two more Yandruwandha clans who offered their hospitality to him. For about a week, Wills lived with them, sharing a gunyah with a man named Poko Tinnamira and learning some of their language. He became friends with another man called Pitchery, and was supplied with ample water and food. They even de-boned the fish for him before he ate it. By 5 June, Wills left this group to reunite with Burke and King.

While Wills was away, Burke and King had also been well cared for by another group of Yandruwandha. However, when one of them took Burke's oilcloth after giving him some fish, Burke ran after him and shot over his head. King had also lined some Yandruwandha up outside the gunyah they were staying in and fired over their heads after he felt threatened by their approach. Burke then went up to another group who had arrived with nets full of fish. He knocked the nets out of their hands and ordered King to fire over them. They ran away and Burke collected the fish left behind. While cooking this fish, Burke accidentally set fire to the gunyah they were in, destroying most of their remaining belongings except for Burke's pistol and another firearm.

On 6 June, Wills had returned to Burke and King. They spent the following days trying to find another Aboriginal camp, but unsurprisingly the Yandruwandha had cleared out from the area. Over the next few weeks, the three men subsisted on leftover camel meat and nardoo they prepared themselves. The weather became rainy and cold, and they had little to protect themselves from exposure to the elements. Wills recorded that the nardoo agreed with King more, while he and Burke were starving and feeling the cold.

=== Death of Burke and Wills ===
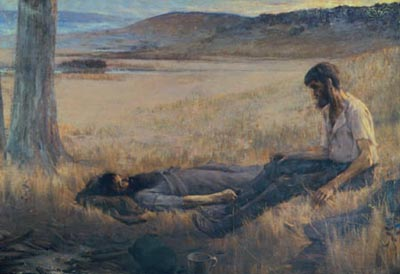
Artur Loureiro, Death of Burke, oil on canvas, 1892

Wills' last entry in his journal was on 29 June, when King and Burke had decided to leave him to look for an Aboriginal camp. Wills had become too weak to continue. At his own insistence he was left behind at Breerily waterhole with some food, water and shelter. Burke and King continued upstream for another two days until Burke became too weak to continue. He died the following morning at a place called Yaenimemgi, his pistol loaded and capped in his hand. King stayed with his body for two days and then returned downstream to Breerily waterhole, where he found that Wills had died as well.

The exact dates on which Burke and Wills died are unknown, and different dates are given on various memorials in Victoria. The Exploration Committee fixed 28 June 1861 as the date both explorers died.

After the deaths of Burke and Wills, King found a two-week supply of nardoo flour at an abandoned Aboriginal camp. He then came across a group of Yandruwandha willing to give him food and shelter, and in return he shot birds to contribute to their supplies. He became more closely united with this clan after he attempted to heal a skin sore on a woman named Carrawaw, and lived with them for around a month until he was found on 15 September by the rescue expedition led by Alfred Howitt.

== Rescue expeditions ==
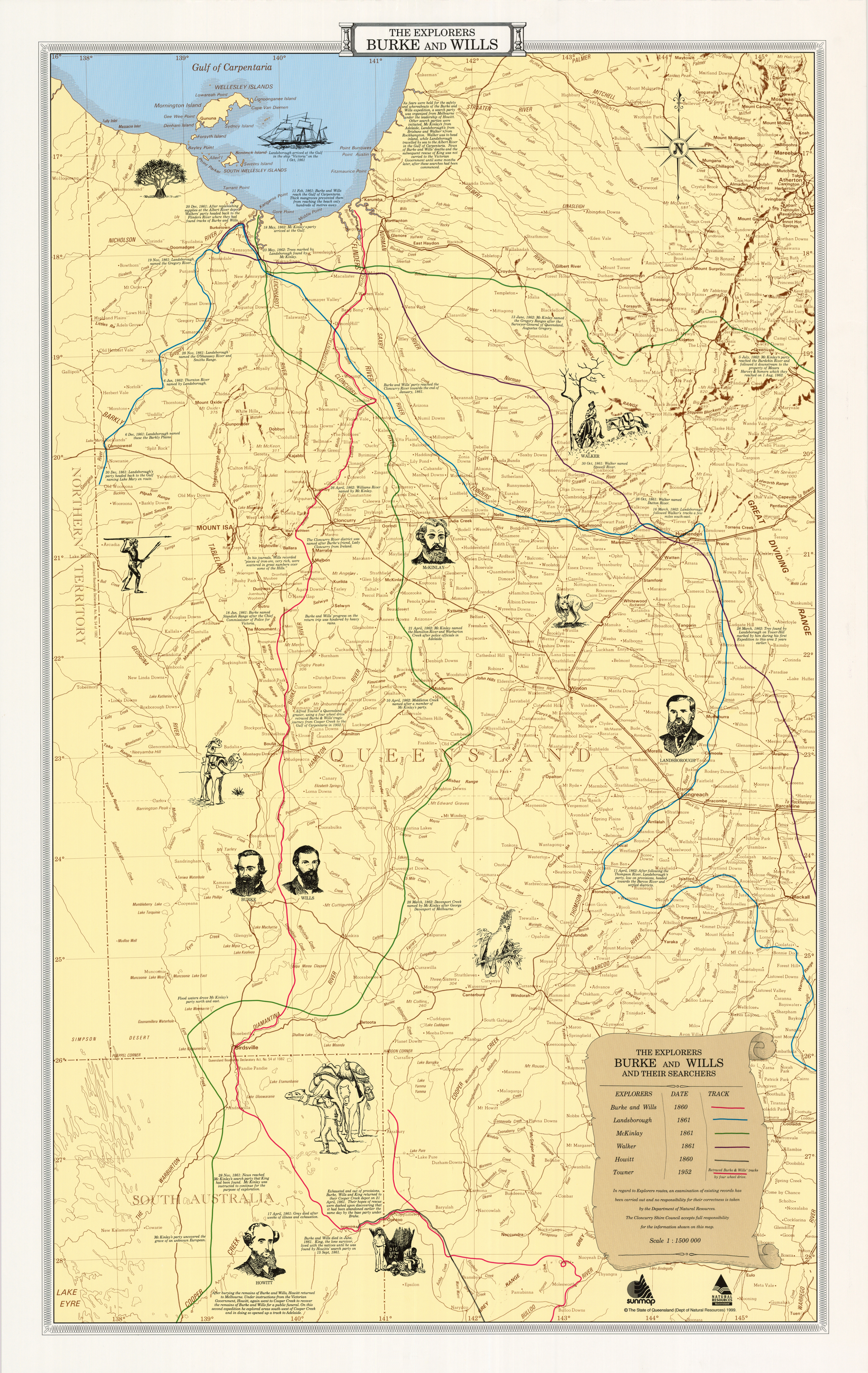
Map of the Burke and Wills expedition and their searchers

In 1861, five expeditions were sent out to search for Burke and Wills; two commissioned by the Exploration Committee, one by the Victorian government, one by the government of Queensland and one by the government of South Australia. HMCSS Victoria was sent from Melbourne to search the Gulf of Carpentaria for the missing expedition, and SS Firefly sailed from Melbourne to Brisbane, where they picked up William Landsborough's Queensland Relief Expedition. The other expeditions went overland, with Howitt's Victorian Contingent Party departing from Melbourne, John McKinlay's South Australian Burke Relief Expedition departing from Adelaide and Frederick Walker's Victorian Relief Expedition departing from Rockhampton.

=== Victorian Contingent Party ===
After six months without receiving word from the Burke and Wills expedition, the media began questioning its whereabouts. Public pressure for answers increased and on 13 June 1861, the Exploration Committee agreed to send a search party to find the expedition and, if necessary, offer them support. The Victorian Contingent Party left Melbourne on 26 June 1861 under the leadership of Alfred Howitt. At the Loddon River, Howitt met Brahe, who was returning from Cooper Creek. As Brahe did not have knowledge of Burke's whereabouts, Howitt decided a much larger expedition would be required to find the missing party. Leaving three of his men at the river, Howitt returned to Melbourne with Brahe to update the Exploration Committee. On 30 June, the expanded expedition left to follow Burke's trail.

On 8 September, the party reached Cooper Creek, on 11 September the "Dig Tree", and four days later the two Aboriginal members of the party, Sandy and Frank, brought news to Howitt that King had been found, living with the Yandruwandha. Over the next week, Howitt located the remains of Burke and Wills and buried them. Howitt had transported four messenger pigeons with him from Melbourne to release when Burke and Wills had been found. On releasing these pigeons one was immediately eaten by a kite while another stayed close to the camp. Howitt gave tomahawks, knives, mirrors, beads, sugar, flour, ribbons and Union Jack handkerchiefs to the Yandruwandha for their kind treatment toward Burke, Wills and King. Tchukulow, Mungalee and the woman Carrawaw were some of the main people acknowledged by Howitt.

Although King was found in a pitiful condition, he recovered rapidly to complete the two-month trip back to Melbourne. He died eleven years later, aged 33, never having fully recovered his health. He is buried in the Melbourne General Cemetery.

=== HMVS Victoria ===
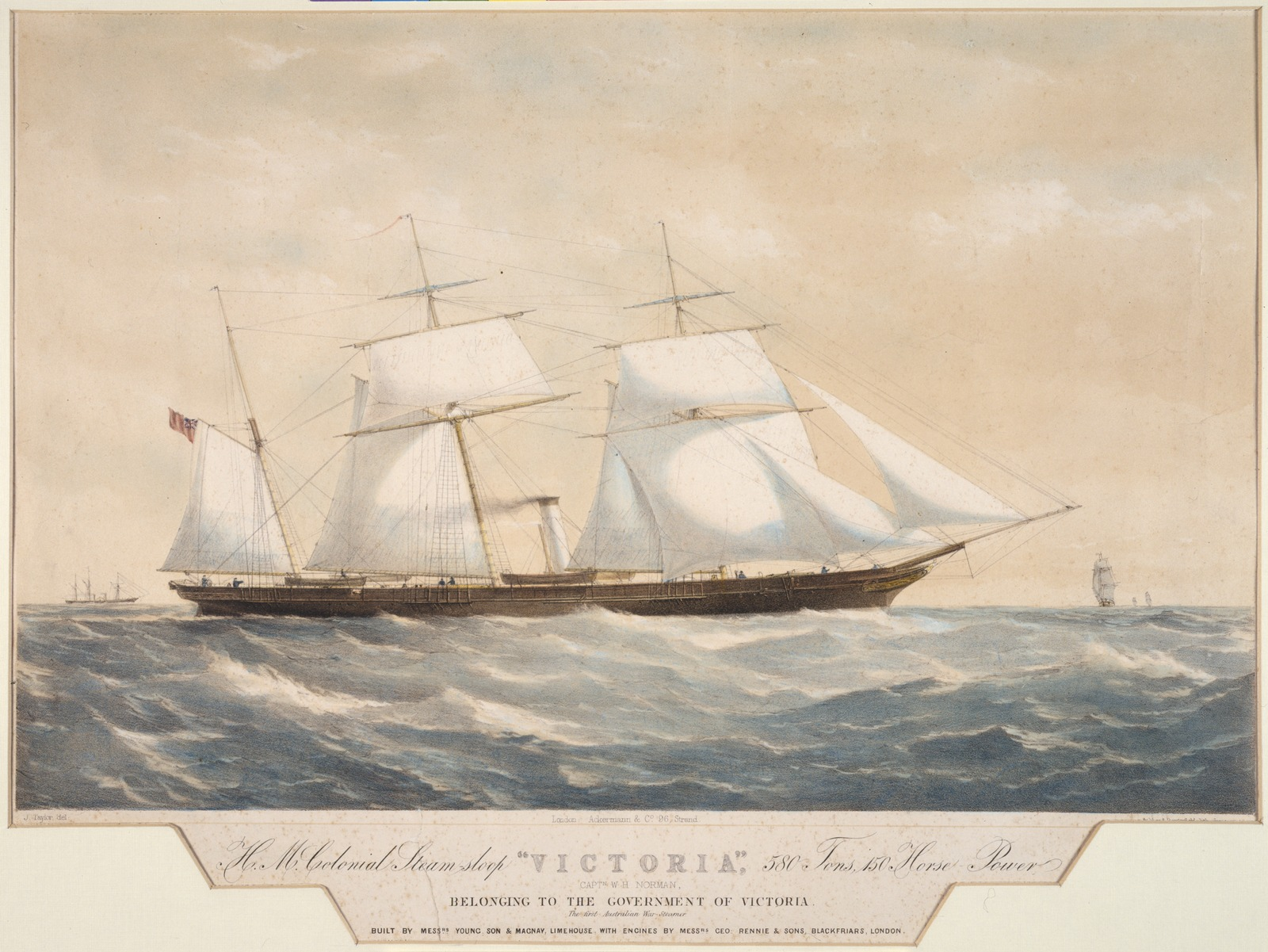
H.M. Colonial Steam-sloop "Victoria"

On 4 August 1861, HMCSS Victoria, under the Command of William Henry Norman, sailed from Hobson's Bay with orders to search the Gulf of Carpentaria. The Victorian government also chartered Firefly (188 tons, built 1843) to assist with transportation. Firefly left Hobson's Bay on 29 July and arrived at Moreton Bay in Brisbane on 10 August 1861, the same day as Victoria. Firefly transported the Queensland party led by William Landsborough, along with thirty horses. The two ships sailed for the Gulf on 24 August 1861.

The ships became separated in a storm on 1 September, and Firefly hit a reef off Sir Charles Hardy Islands. The crew were able to free and save twenty-six of the horses by cutting a hole in the side of the ship. Victoria arrived shortly afterwards. Firefly was repaired and able to be towed by Victoria. They recommenced their journey on 22 September, arriving near Sweers Island and Albert River on 29 September, where they rendezvoused with the brig Gratia and the schooner Native Lass, which had also been chartered by the Victorian government as support. They established a land base on Sweers, after visiting Bentinck Island and finding it inhabited by "hostile natives".

Using Victoria's boats, Firefly was manoeuvred up the Albert River some 20 miles (32 km) to a suitable place to transfer the horses and stores to land.

=== Queensland Relief Expedition ===
After disembarking from Victoria in November, Landsborough's Queensland Relief Expedition searched the north coast for the missing expedition. The party proceeded south and, while they found no trace of Burke's party, they continued all the way to Melbourne arriving in August 1862. This was the first European expedition to traverse mainland Australia from northern to southern coast. Landsborough named various geographical entities along the way, such as the Barkly Tableland, Gregory River and Aramac Creek. On reaching the Thomson River, they were guided along the best routes by the local Aboriginal people, while at the Barcoo River they had a skirmish with a clan of the Kuungkari, resulting in one of these people being shot dead. In 1881, the Queensland Parliament awarded Landsborough £2000 for his achievements as an explorer.

=== Victorian Relief Expedition ===
Frederick Walker led the Victorian Relief Expedition. The party, consisting of twelve mounted men, seven of them ex-troopers from the Native Police Corps, started from Rockhampton on 7 September 1861 with the goal of reaching the Gulf of Carpentaria. On 30 October, they came across a group of Aboriginal people at the Stawell River, killing twelve in the fight that ensued. On 25 November, they found traces of Burke's track near the Bynoe River and followed them close to Camp 119 but lost the trail from there. On 1 December they had another encounter with a large group of Aboriginals, whom they charged and inflicted a heavy loss upon. On 7 December, Walker met up with Commander Norman of Victoria in the Gulf.

=== South Australian Burke Relief Expedition ===
The South Australian House of Assembly chose John McKinlay to lead the South Australian Burke Relief Expedition, which left Adelaide on 16 August 1861. On 21 October the grave of a European man was found at Lake Kadhi-baeri, about 100km north of Lake Hope on Cooper Creek. It was ascertained that this man was part of a group of three and was killed during a conflict with local Aboriginal people probably many months previously. Several Aboriginal people had also been killed, and some of the survivors showed McKinlay their bullet wounds. The dead man's two associates had left to the south. In vengeance, the Aboriginal people had cut off some of the dead man's muscle, cooked it and ate it. McKinlay assumed that the dead man was a member of the Burke expedition until he received news a few weeks later that Howitt had found King and the bodies of Burke and Wills. Some sources claim the man to have been Gray.

The same group of Aboriginal people later became angry at McKinlay's party, surrounding and shouting at them. McKinlay ordered his men to fire several rounds at them, with many feeling the effects. The Aboriginal people retreated to the lake, where McKinlay's men fired at them some more, dispersing them completely.

McKinlay then decided to make exploration the focus of his expedition and headed in the direction of Central Mount Stuart, but was driven back by heavy rains and floods. He then made for the Gulf of Carpentaria, hoping to find Victoria still there. By 20 May 1862, McKinlay was around five miles (8 km) from the shore of the gulf, but the intervening country was found to be impassable and he decided to turn east and make for Port Denison on the north coast. On 2 August 1862 he reached a station on the Bowen River, and after resting a few days the expedition reached Port Denison. The party then returned by sea to Adelaide. McKinlay received a grant of £1000 from the government and a gold watch from the Royal Geographical Society of England.

== Expedition to recover the remains of Burke and Wills ==
In late 1861, Howitt was tasked with returning to Cooper Creek, exhuming Burke and Wills' remains and returning them to Melbourne for a state funeral. Howitt and his party left Melbourne on 9 December. After a long stay in Menindee and again at Mount Murchison, the expedition arrived at Cooper Creek on 25 February 1862, camping at Cullyamurra waterhole. From there Howitt undertook numerous exploratory trips into the surrounding area. On 13 April, Wills' remains were exhumed, and in September 1862, Burke's bones were retrieved from the grave that Howitt had dug a year earlier.

For the next six months, Howitt explored the Australian interior before deciding in November to return to the settled areas. On 8 December the party arrived in Clare, South Australia. Howitt and the expedition's doctor continued on to Adelaide while the rest of the party followed three days later by train. Burke's and Wills' remains were then taken to Melbourne, arriving on 29 December 1862.

On this expedition, Howitt presented three breastplates commissioned by the Exploration Committee to the Yandruwandha people in appreciation of the assistance they had given to Burke, Wills and King. Breastplates were often issued to Aboriginal people for faithful service to the colonists. One of these plates is in the collection of the National Museum of Australia. The inscription on the plate states that it was presented "for the Humanity shewn to the Explorers Burke, Wills and King 1861".

== Controversy and blame ==
Fairly or unfairly, blame for the deaths of Burke and Wills have been focused on three individuals, namely Brahe, Wright and Burke himself.

Brahe could have stayed longer at Camp 65 were it not for the leg injury suffered by the blacksmith Patton, necessitating the Brahe party's departure for Menindee that morning. Patton was to die from complications six weeks later. Burke and Wills discussed catching up with them, but they were too exhausted and decided to wait.

Wright's delay at Menindee and at the Bulloo River subsequently resulted in his being blamed for the deaths of Burke and Wills. In 1963, Alan Moorehead wrote of the 'mystery' surrounding Wright's delay:

There was no basis here for criminal proceedings against Wright, but he had been publicly condemned as the man on whom the guilt chiefly lay, and that was a reputation that he was unlikely ever to live down. He retired to obscurity in Adelaide, leaving behind him still a slight, persistent mystery: why had he really delayed? Was it only because he wanted to make sure of his salary? Was it because he did not want to leave his wife and family and the comforts of the settled districts? Was it merely that he was stupid, lazy and indifferent: a man too mean-spirited to think of anyone but himself? Or was it just possible that he was the victim of that same fated chain of errors that had bedevilled the expedition from the beginning? These were questions that would never be fully answered.

An in-depth study of Wright's action formed a part of Dr Tom Bergin's 1982 MA thesis. Bergin, who recreated the original journey from Cooper Creek to the Gulf of Carpentaria with camels in 1978, showed that a lack of money and too few pack animals to carry supplies meant Wright was placed in an unenviable position. His requests to the Exploration Committee were not acted on until early January, by which time the hot weather and lack of water meant that the party moved extremely slowly.

Burke's abrasive personality, poor decision making and hostile behaviour to some of his fellow expeditioners and to Aboriginal people has also been pointed out as contributing factors to the disaster.

== Cause of death ==
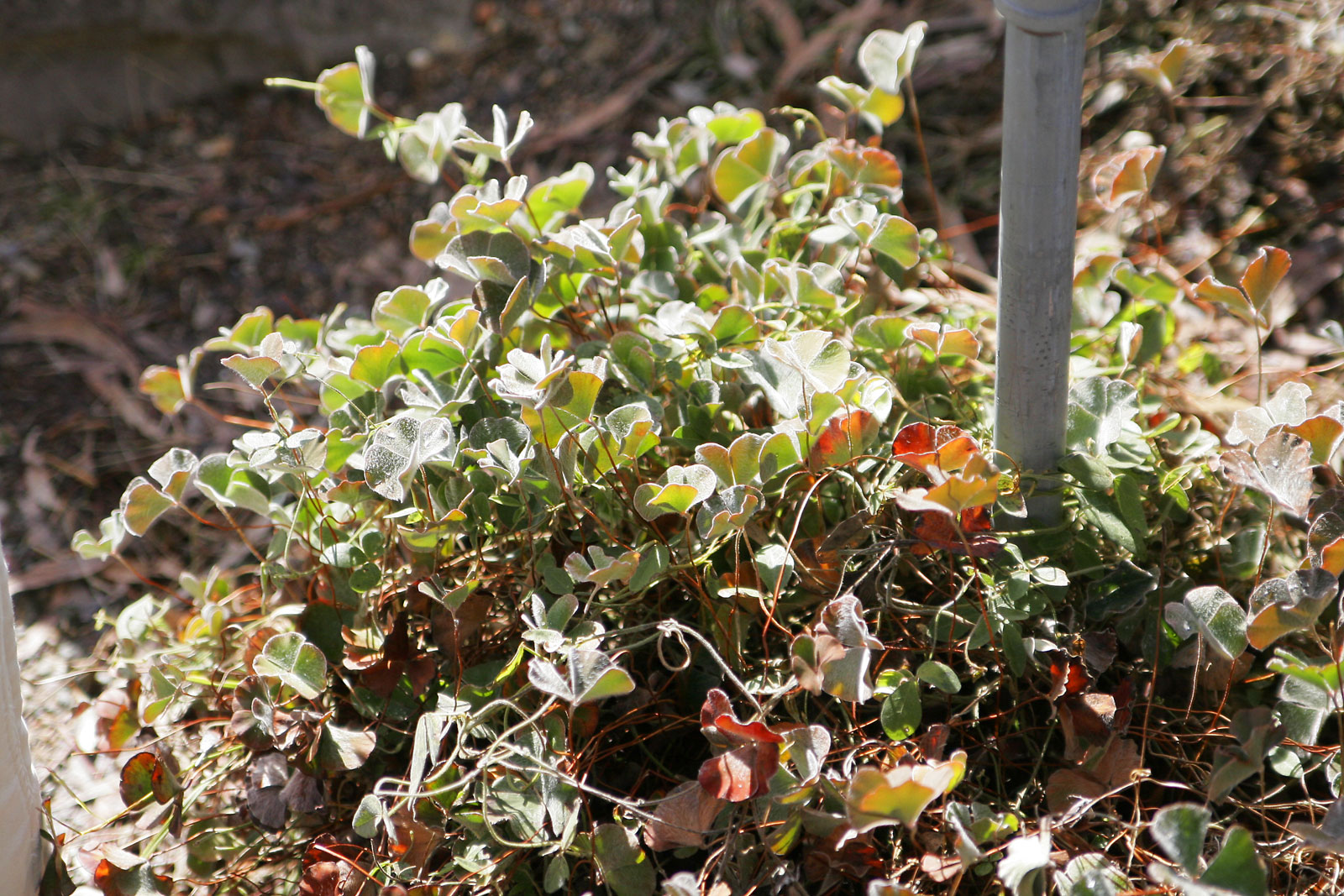
Aboriginal people fed the explorers seedcakes made from the sporocarps of this plant, nardoo

Unknown to the explorers, nardoo sporocarps contain the enzyme thiaminase, which depletes the body of vitamin B_{1} (thiamin). It is probable that they were not preparing the seedcakes in accordance with Aboriginal food preparation methods, as the food was a staple among the local people. It has been argued that Burke's party did not first process the food into a paste, which might have prevented the ill effects they suffered. Despite eating, the men got weaker and weaker. Wills wrote in his diary:

My pulse is at 48 and very weak and my legs and arms are nearly skin and bone. I can only look out like Mr Micawber for something to turn up, but starvation on nardoo is by no means unpleasant, but for the weakness one feels, and the utter inability to move oneself, for as the appetite is concerned, it gives me the greatest satisfaction.

As a result, it is likely that the deaths of Burke and Wills resulted in part from a vitamin deficiency disease called beriberi. Evidence to this effect is further provided by King's account, which revealed that Burke complained of leg and back pain shortly before his death. However, other research suggests that scurvy (vitamin C deficiency) and environmental factors also contributed to their deaths.

== Cooper Creek summary ==
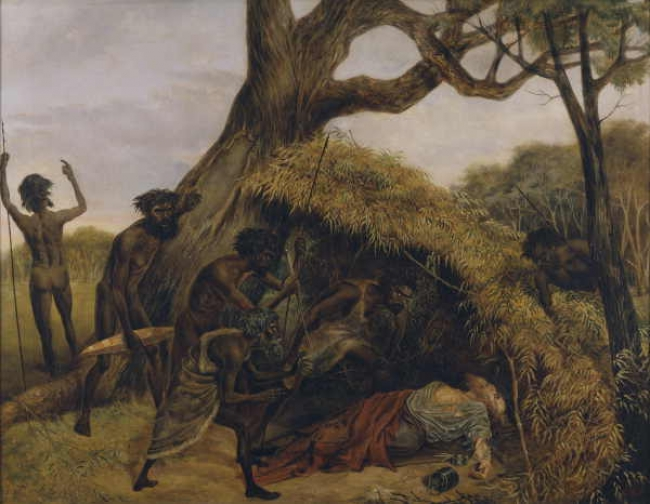
Eugene Montagu Scott, Natives discovering the body of William John Wills, the explorer, at Coopers Creek, June 1861, oil on canvas, 1862

- 11 November 1860. Burke, Wills, King, Gray, Brahe, Mahomet, Patton and McDonough made their first camp on what they thought was Cooper Creek, but which was actually the Wilson River. This was Camp LVII (Camp 57).
- 20 November 1860. The first Depôt Camp was established at Camp LXIII (Camp 63).
- 6 December 1860. The Depôt Camp was moved downstream to Camp LXV—The Dig Tree (Camp 65).
- 16 December 1860. Burke, Wills, King and Gray left the Depôt for the Gulf of Carpentaria.
- 16 December 1860—21 April 1861. Brahe is left in charge of the Depôt at Cooper Creek.
- 21 April 1861. Brahe buried a cache of supplies, carved a message in the Dig Tree and headed back to Menindee. Later that day, Burke, Wills and King returned from the Gulf to find the Depôt deserted.
- 23 April 1861. Burke, Wills and King followed the Cooper downstream heading towards Mount Hopeless in South Australia.
- 7 May 1861. The last camel, Rajah, died. The men cannot carry enough supplies to leave the creek.
- 8 May 1861. Brahe and Wright return to the Dig Tree. They stayed only 15 minutes and did not dig up Burke's note in the cache.
- 30 May 1861. Wills, having failed to reach Mount Hopeless, returned to the Dig Tree to bury his notebooks in the cache for safe-keeping.
- End of June / early July 1861. Burke and Wills died.
- 11 September 1861. Howitt, leader of the Burke Relief Expedition arrived at the Dig Tree.
- 15 September 1861. Howitt found King, the only survivor of the four men who reached the Gulf.
- 28 September 1861. Howitt dug up the cache at the 'Dig Tree' and recovered Wills' notebooks.

== Deaths on the Victorian Exploring Expedition ==
- Charley Gray, Wednesday, 17 April 1861 at Polygonum Swamp.
- Charles Stone, Monday, 22 April 1861 at Koorliatto Waterhole, Bulloo River.
- William Purcell, Tuesday, 23 April 1861 at Koorliatto Waterhole, Bulloo River.
- Dr Ludwig Becker, Monday, 29 April 1861 at Koorliatto Waterhole, Bulloo River.
- William Patton, Wednesday, 5 June 1861 near Desolation Camp, Rat Point.
- William John Wills, the official date of death adopted by the Exploration Committee was Wednesday, 28 June 1861, but Wills probably died around Friday, 30 June or Saturday, 1 July 1861 at Breerily Waterhole, Cooper Creek.
- Robert O'Hara Burke, the official date of death adopted by the Exploration Committee was Wednesday, 28 June 1861, but Burke probably died on Saturday, 1 July 1861 at Burke's Waterhole, Cooper Creek.

== Aftermath ==
The Victorian government held a Commission of Enquiry into the deaths of Burke and Wills. Howitt was sent back to Cooper Creek to recover their bodies.

=== Commission of Enquiry ===
The Commission was convened on 18 November 1861, and the results of their investigations were presented to both houses of the colonial parliament. It was laid on the table of the Legislative Council on 4 March 1862.

The Commission found that Burke "evinced far greater amount of zeal than prudence in finally departing from Cooper's Creek before the depot party had arrived from Menindie", found the conduct of Mr Wright "to have been reprehensible" and had some sympathy for Brahe, upon whom "a responsibility far beyond his expectations devolved upon him". The Commission judged that in leaving the depot before Burke returned or further relief had arrived was regrettable, but that Brahe had "acted from a conscientious desire to discharge his duty."

Subsequent historians have posited that the commissioners were compromised by their close relationships with members of the RSV and failed to question them with the same zeal that was applied to men like Brahe.

=== Funeral ===
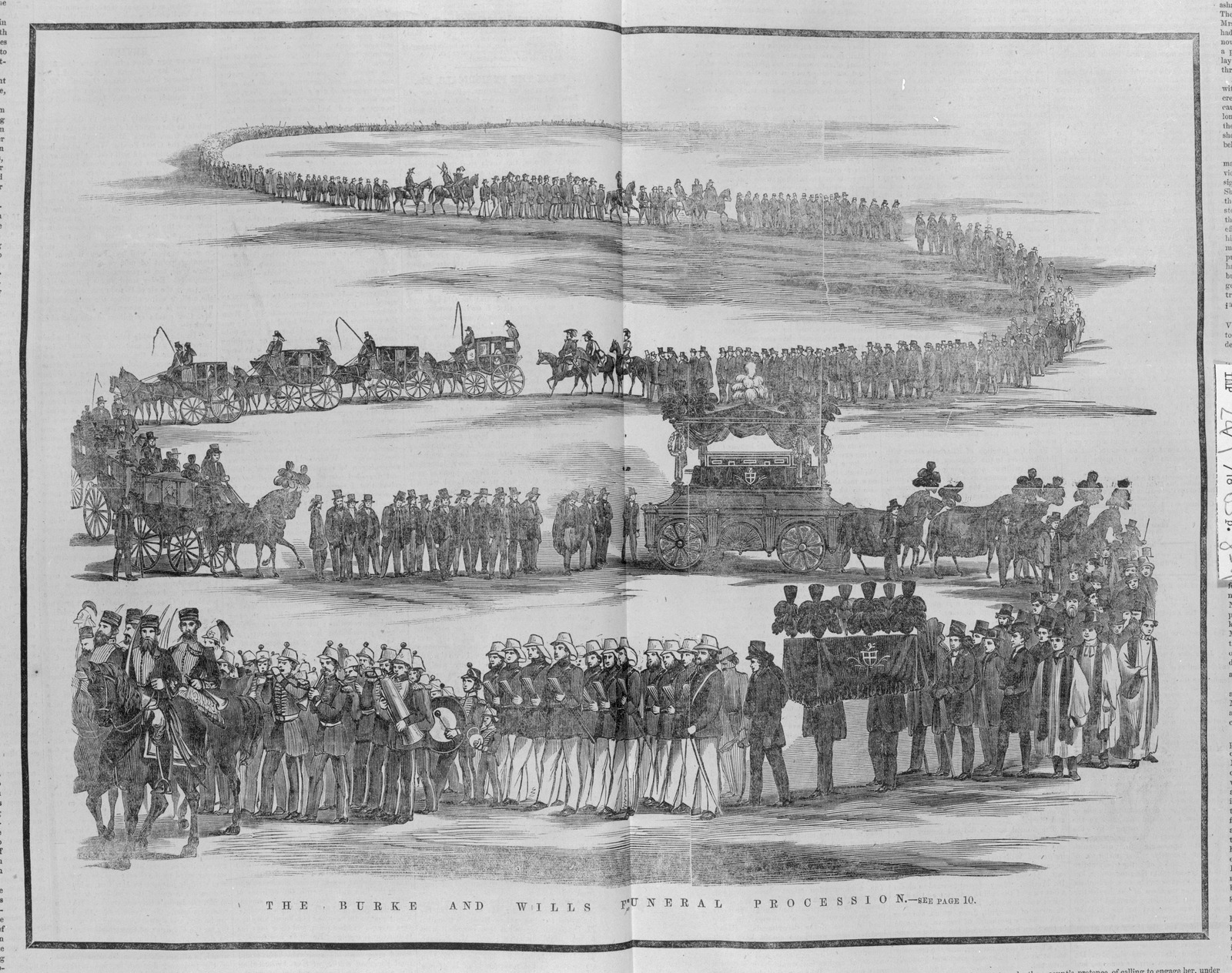
The Burke and Wills funeral procession

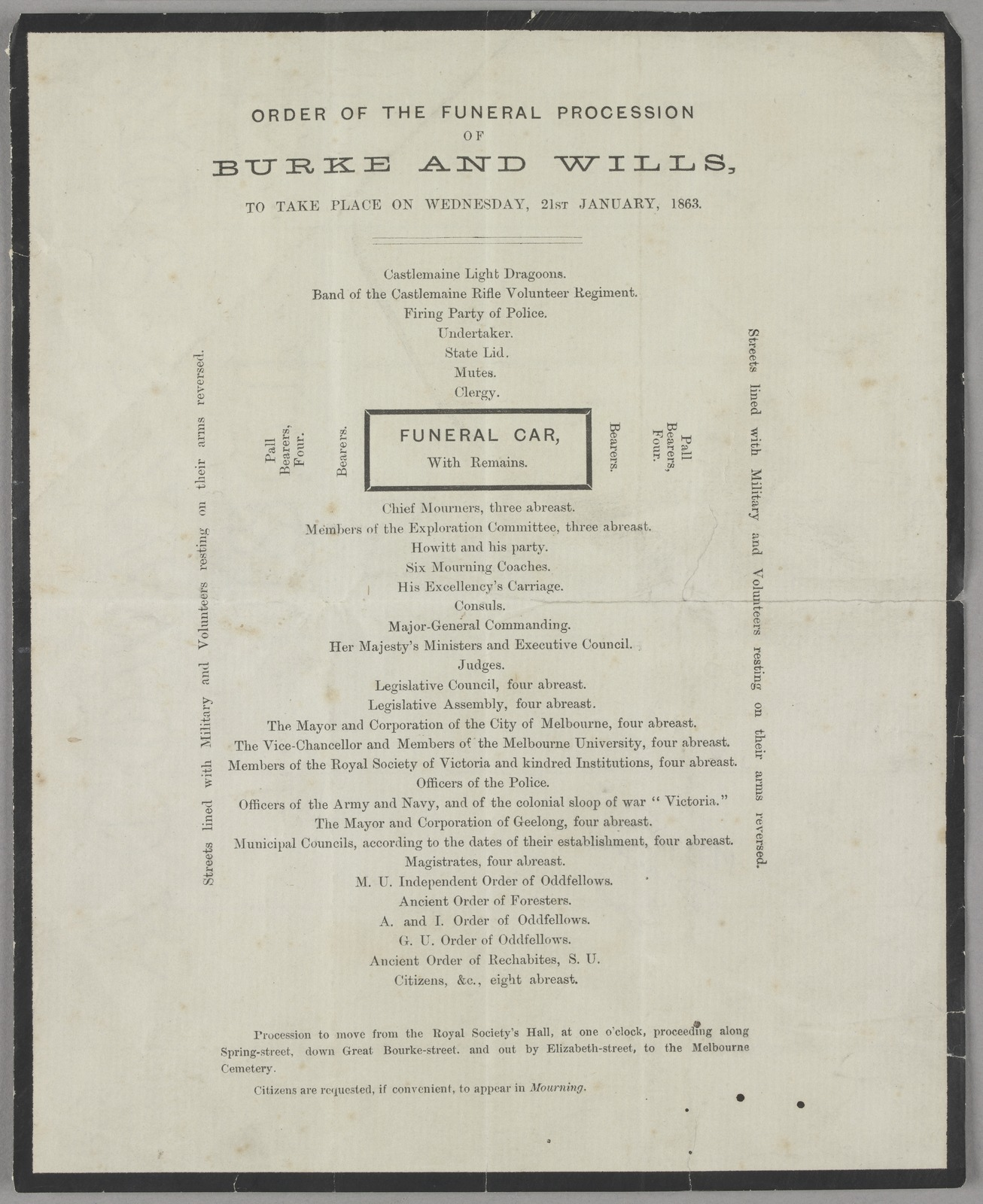
Order of the funeral procession of Burke and Wills, Wednesday, 21 January, 1863

Howitt sailed from Adelaide to Melbourne on the SS Havilah with the remains of Burke and Wills in a small wooden box, arriving at Hobson's Bay on 28 December 1862. The box was taken to the hall of the RSV, and a coffining ceremony was held on 31 December. This ceremony was delayed because Dr. John Macadam, who held the only key to the box, arrived late. A locksmith was called but before he could pick the lock Dr Macadam, blaming his own distress for his lateness, finally arrived with the key.

The remains were placed in state for two weeks. Around 100,000 people visited the RSV hall to view the coffins.

It was originally proposed that the funeral should take place at St James Cathedral, but it was decided this would be impractical because of the expected crowds and the difficulty of moving the coffins into the church from the grand mourning vehicle. It was agreed that a service at the cemetery would be appropriate.

The order and carriage of the clergy was discussed with agreement that they would walk in the procession with the Protestant clergy in front, followed by the Roman Catholics. This small example of ecumenism is interesting given the general enmity and divisive sectarianism between Irish Catholics and English Protestants that blighted Victoria's history over the previous century.

The state funeral of Burke and Wills was held on 21 January 1863. It was an elaborate affair, with the funeral car modelled on the design used for the Duke of Wellington ten years earlier. It was estimated that 40,000 people lined the streets of Melbourne. Many had travelled from rural Victoria, especially the Castlemaine area where Burke had served most recently as police superintendent.

Burke and Wills were buried at the Melbourne General Cemetery. There the Dean of Melbourne, Hussey Burgh Macartney, conducted an Anglican burial service, but clergy representing various Christian denominations were represented in the funeral procession.

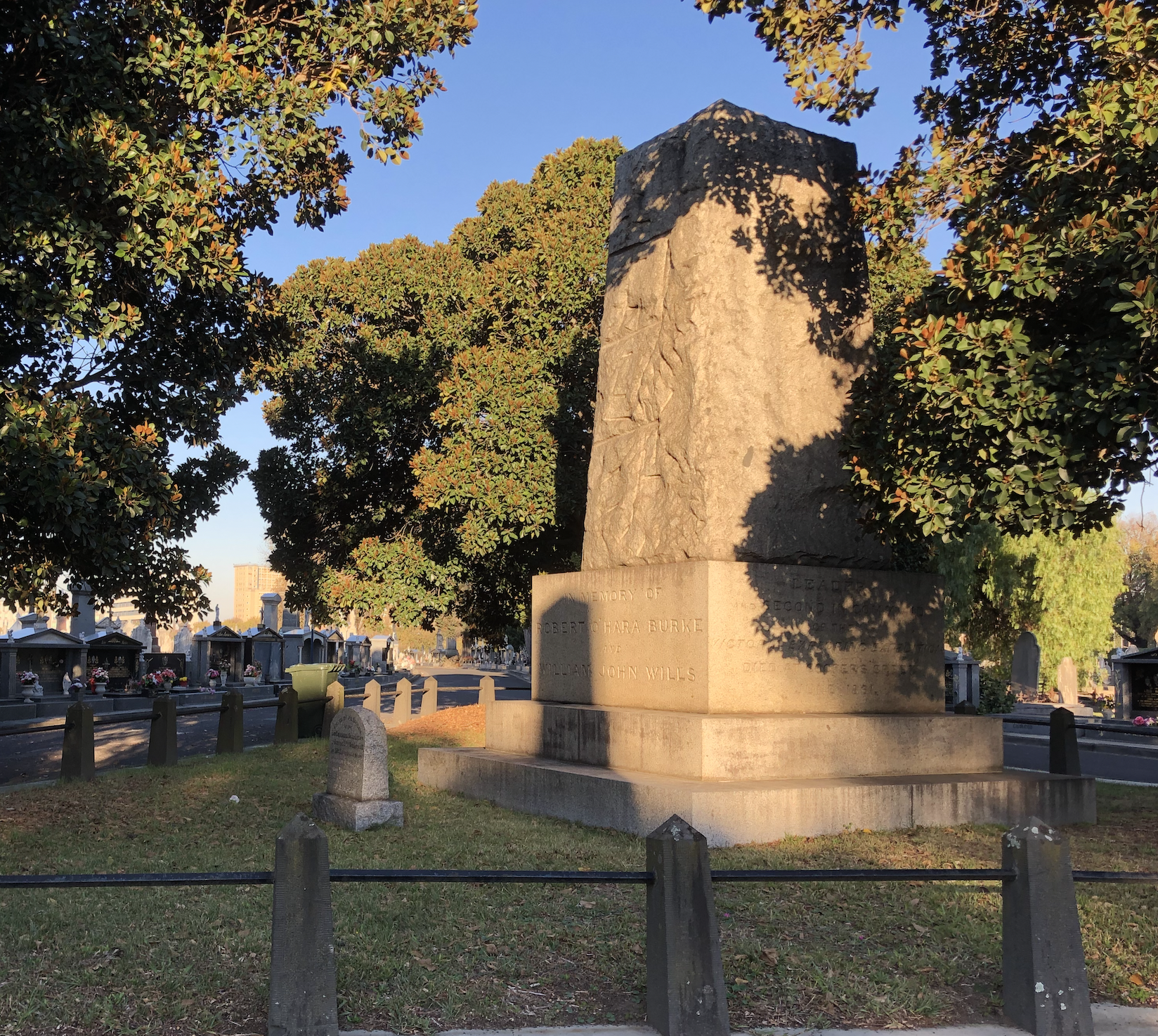
Inscribed 'Comrades in a great achievement, Companions in death and associates in renown.'The granite monolith marking the graves of Burke & Wills. Melbourne General Cemetery

At 8pm that evening there was a public meeting at St George's Hall, where Macadam addressed the crowd, and acknowledged the contributions of Ambrose Kyte, Howitt and Commander Norman.

=== Legacy ===
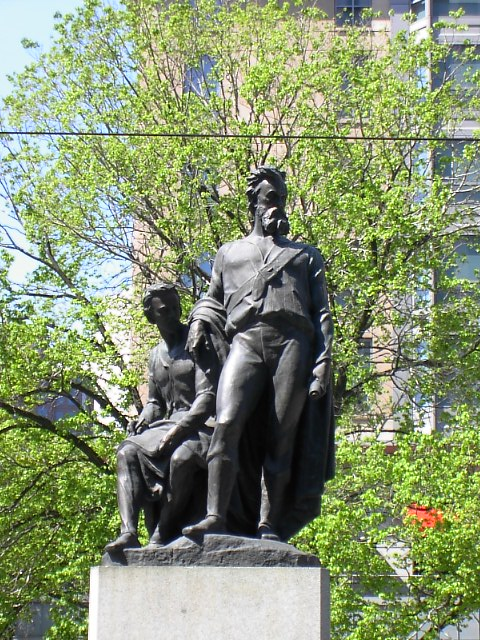
Burke and Wills Statue by Charles Summers on the corner of Collins and Swanston Streets, Melbourne.

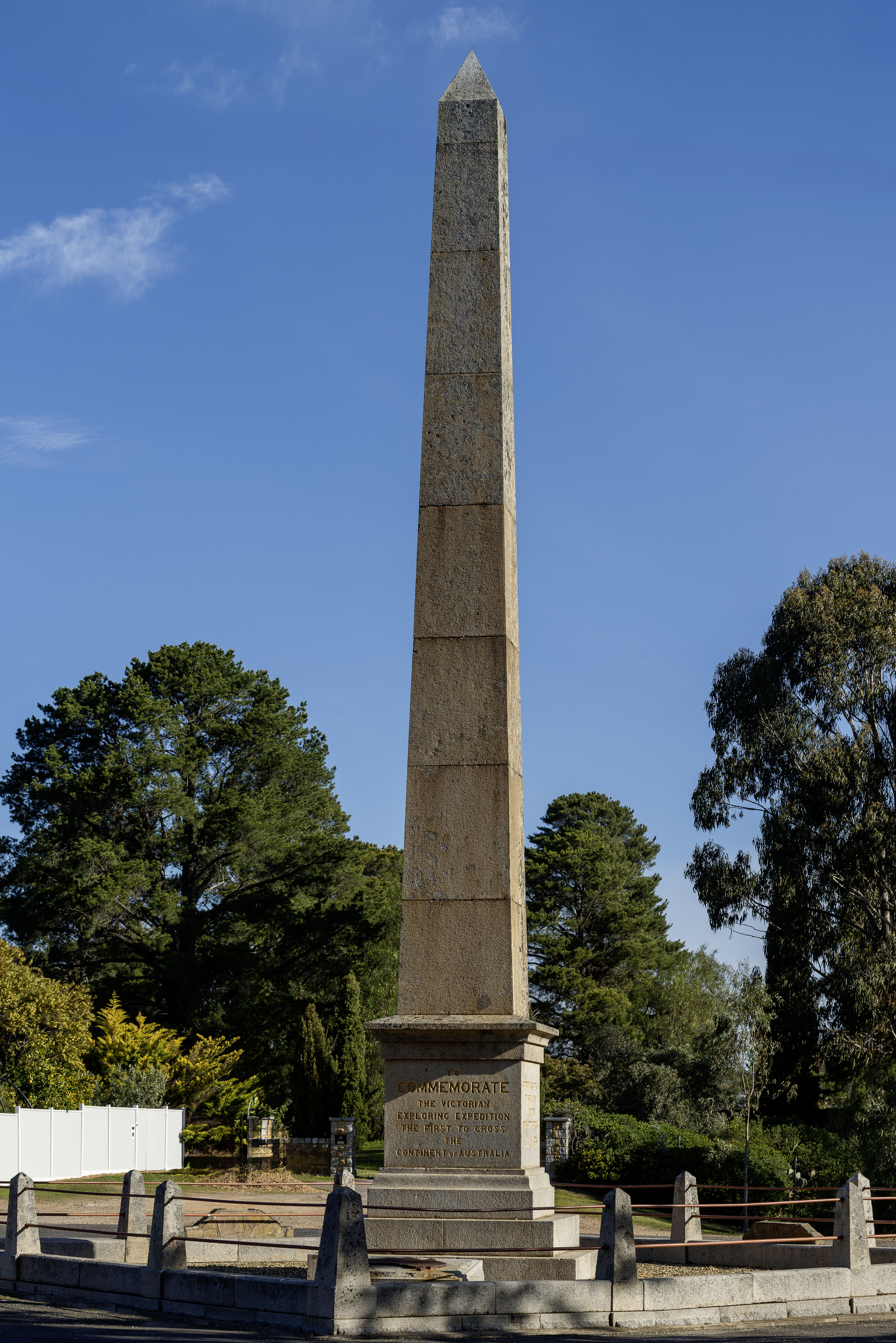
Burke and Wills expedition monument, Castlemaine

In some ways the tragic expedition was not a waste. It completed the picture of inland Australia and proved that there was no inland sea. More importantly, each of the rescue parties sent from different parts of the continent added in some way to the understanding of the land it crossed.

In the years immediately following the expedition, monuments to Burke were erected in Melbourne, Castlemaine, Ballarat, Bendigo, Beechworth and Fryerstown. In 1863, when Julius von Haast searched for a crossing from Otago to the west coast in New Zealand, he named two rivers flowing into the Haast River after Burke and Wills.

In 1983, the Burke and Wills expedition were honoured on a postage stamp depicting their portraits issued by Australia Post. In August 2010 Australia Post issued four stamps to commemorate the 150th anniversary.

A silent movie, A Romance of Burke and Wills Expedition of 1860, was released in 1918. The plot is fictional and only loosely connected to the historical expedition. In 1957, Anthony Quayle was linked to a proposed film about the expedition written by Ralph Peterson. It was never made. In the 1960s, William Sterling attempted to make a feature film about the expedition that resulted in the short documentary Return Journey. In 1970 it was announced a film of the expedition written by Terence Rattigan called Mr Burke and Mr Wills would start filming later that year, but no film resulted.

The 1966 stage play Burke's Company dramatised the expedition.

In 1975 an episode of a BBC documentary series called The Explorers featured the Burke and Wills expedition, narrated by David Attenborough (replaced with narration by Anthony Quinn in the later 1976 US broadcast) and directed by Lord Snowdon.

In 1985 the film, Burke & Wills, was made with Jack Thompson as Burke and Nigel Havers as Wills. Also in 1985, the spoof Wills & Burke was released with Garry McDonald as Burke and Kym Gyngell as Wills.

In 2002 the book "The Dig Tree" by Sarah Murgatroyd was published. This provides a detailed account of the expedition.

In November 2009 the Royal Australian Mint issued two coins, $1 and a 20 cent, to commemorate the 150th anniversary of the expedition.

== Heritage listings ==
Heritage listings associated with the Burke and Wills expedition include:

- Burke and Wills Dig Tree near Thargomindah within Durham, Shire of Bulloo, listed on the Queensland Heritage Register
- Burke and Wills Plant Camp near Betoota within Birdsville, Shire of Diamantina, listed on the Queensland Heritage Register
- Burke and Wills Camp B/CXIX near Normanton, Shire of Carpentaria, listed on the Queensland Heritage Register

== See also ==
- History of Australia
- Royal Society of Victoria
- List of places associated with the Burke and Wills expedition
