= Burke and Wills Camp B/CXIX =

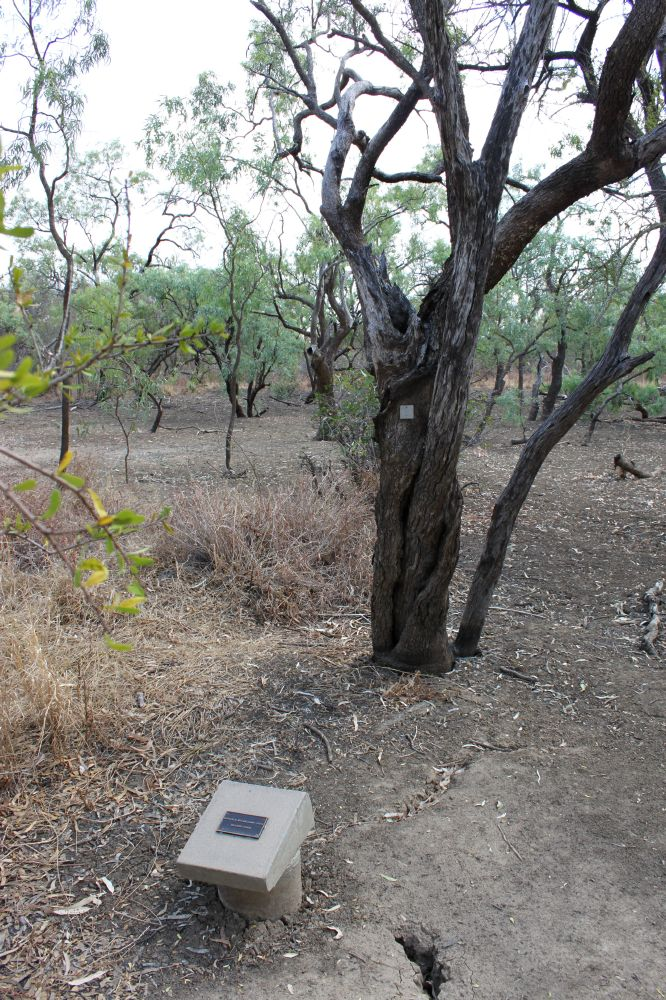
- Burke and Wills Camp B-CXIX, 2010

- Location within Queensland Location within Australia
- 17.8763°S 140.8269°E
- Location: Burke and Wills Access Road (Private Road), Normanton, Shire of Carpentaria, Queensland, Australia

History
- Design period: 1840s–1860s (mid-19th century)

Queensland Heritage Register
- Official name: Burke and Wills' Camp B/CXIX and Walker's Camp, Little Bynoe River, Walker's Camp
- Type: state heritage (archaeological, landscape)
- Designated: 14 August 2008
- Reference no.: 602156
- Significant period: 1861–62
- Significant components: blazed tree/dig tree/marker tree, memorial/monument

Burke and Wills Camp B/CXIX is a heritage-listed campsite at Burke and Wills Access Road (Private Road), Normanton, Shire of Carpentaria, Queensland, Australia. It is also known as Walker's Camp. It was added to the Queensland Heritage Register on 14 August 2008.

== History ==
On 11 February 1861, four members of the Burke and Wills expedition attempting to cross the Australian continent from south to north, established their most northerly campsite adjacent the Bynoe River (west of the Norman River) in the Gulf of Carpentaria. Two of the party camped at this location for three days while expedition leader Robert O'Hara Burke and surveyor William John Wills ventured further north in an attempt to reach the Gulf coast. During their occupation of the site, the party blazed 15 trees to mark its location. A search party led by Frederick Walker arrived in the area 11 months later, on 8 January 1862, and also established a camp on a small seasonal lagoon near Burke and Wills' Camp B/CXIX. Walker's expedition blazed a tree to record the location of their camp approximately 0.75 miles (1.21 km) north of Burke and Wills' Camp B/CXIX.

Inspired by the prevailing interest in the sciences and exploration, the Royal Society of Victoria established a committee in 1857 to "fit out" an expedition to traverse the Australian continent from "south to north". The Royal Society, a philosophical organisation whose membership came from the highest levels of society, the sciences, the squattocracy and the government in Victoria, approached the community for donations to fund the exploration. Within two years they raised over £9,000 including £6,000 from the Victorian Government. The chief aim of the expedition was to build on previous exploration work in order to open up the "centre" of the continent.

The Royal Society advertised the position of leader of the Victorian Exploration Expedition and Robert O'Hara Burke, a police superintendent from the Castlemaine District of Victoria, was chosen to lead the expedition - a position he had anxiously and diligently pursued. Burke was born in 1821 in County Galway, Ireland, to Protestant gentry. He was educated at Woolwich and served as a lieutenant in the Austrian cavalry and later in the Irish Mounted Constabulary before emigrating to Australia in 1853.

The Society chose William John Wills as the expedition's surveyor and astronomer and third-in-command behind camel master George James Landells. Wills was born in Devon, England in 1834 and trained in medicine. He emigrated to Australia in 1853 and after a short stint working as a shepherd at Deniliquin, New South Wales, he assisted in his father's medical practice at Ballarat in Victoria.

The guidance from the Royal Society regarding the details of the expedition were unclear and it appeared from instructions presented to Burke on 16 August 1860, that he could travel in any direction he chose once he arrived at Cooper's Creek. However, there was pressure on Burke and Wills to hasten to the "centre" ahead of a rival South Australian group to be led by John McDouall Stuart, who was instructed to explore to the northwest across the continent.

Burke left Melbourne ahead of Stuart with a large party of men, stock and supplies. By the time he reached Menindee on the Darling River, it was obvious that the push north was going to be hampered by extreme summer weather and the slow speed of the drays carrying equipment and stores. Burke decided to establish a permanent camp there while waiting for the last of his equipment to arrive. Feeling that he had to continue north as quickly as possible, Burke left a party of men at Menindee and pressed on towards Cooper's Creek with a reduced team of eight men. He arranged to have the rest of the team and stores moved up to Cooper's Creek within three months.

On arrival at Cooper's Creek, Burke decided to make a dash for the Gulf with Wills, Charles Gray and John King, before the wet season set in. This northern party was made up of Burke as party leader, Wills as second-in-command and astronomer, navigator and meteorologist, King as attendant to the party's camels, and Gray as camp organizer.

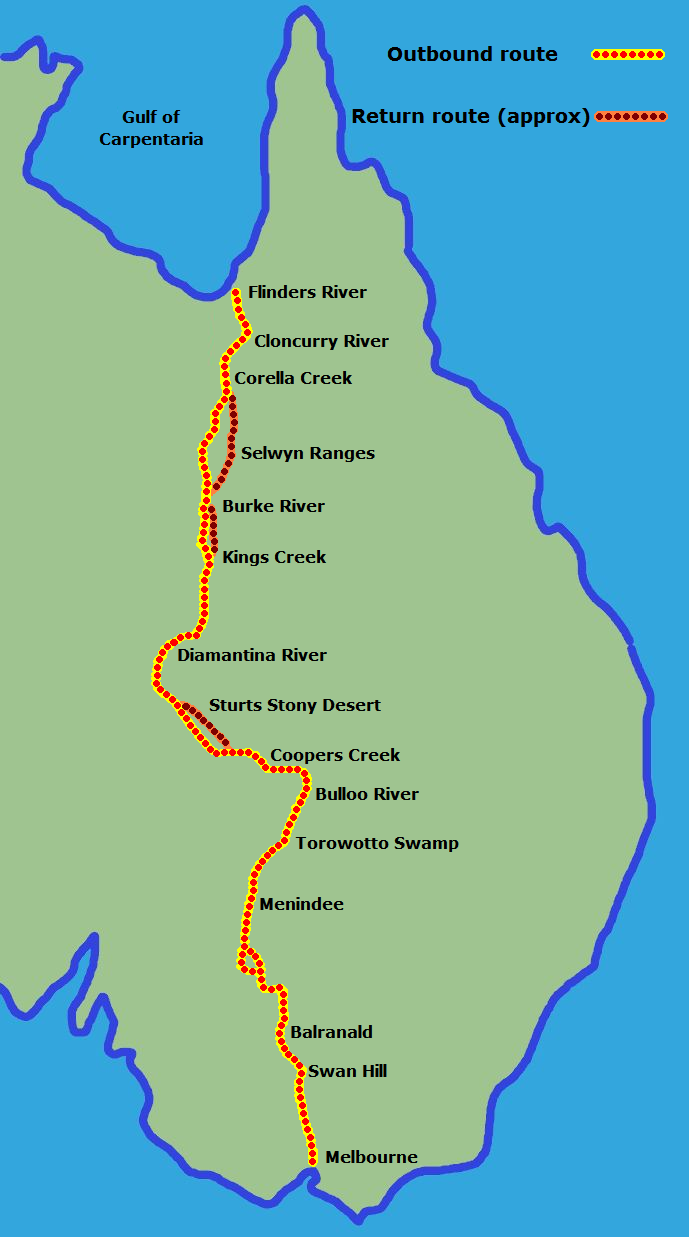
Burke and Wills route map

Following a line to the northeast of Stuart's proposed track, Burke and his team arrived at the Little Bynoe River on 11 February 1861. They were 57 days out from Cooper's Creek and 13 days over the planned time. Burke and Wills' Camp B/CXIX became the most northern of their camps as mangroves blocked further progress to the Gulf. As they were running low on stores and concerned about meeting the remainder of the exploration party at Cooper's Creek, Burke and Wills left Gray and King at Camp B/CXIX and pushed further north through the mangroves in an attempt to reach the Gulf of Carpentaria coast. However, after three days of difficult travel, they returned south picking up Gray and King at Camp B/CXIX. The explorers left little evidence of their stay on the Gulf except for 15 blazed coolibah and Gutta-percha trees.

Most early Australian explorers marked their route of passage across the continent by blazing trees. Blazed trees identify the routes they travelled and the points along their route where they made important observations. Distinguishing markings were often cut within each blaze. The most common markings included the initials of the explorer, the date the blaze was made, and a unique number related to the progress of the expedition (e.g. the number "1" would be used to signify the location as camp number 1. Explorers were often directed by expedition organisers and sponsors on the configuration of the actual markings to be cut. B/CXIX signifies Burke's 119th camp. It was common for unique markings on blazed trees to be matched with entries made in explorers' diaries and journals. In this manner, it is sometimes possible to gain an understanding of what occurred at a particular location when little physical evidence remains.

Between 14 February and 21 April 1861, the four men, with Gray sickening, struggled back towards Cooper's Creek on short supplies and with failing camels. Gray became ill suffering from pain in his head and limbs. His condition continued to deteriorate until he died on the morning of 17 April 1861.

Travel had been so slow that the team at Cooper's Creek gave up hope after four months of waiting, and after burying messages and food at the foot of a tree, left the camp to go for help hours before Burke, Wills and King returned to the camp. Thinking they were alone and unaware of the buried supplies, the three men attempted to reach the nearest police station at Mount Hopeless in South Australia. However, the difficult terrain and the health of the explorers and their two remaining camels were so bad they were forced to remain along Cooper's Creek, where both Burke and Wills died in late June. King was cared for by local Aboriginal people and survived until rescued by Alfred William Howitt's search party in mid-September 1861.

Apart from Howitt, others were sent to search for the lost explorers. One such person was Frederick Walker, who had already made several prospecting trips on behalf of pastoralists during 1860 and 1861. In late 1861, Walker led a party to find the Burke and Wills expedition. Walker established his own camp on a small seasonal lagoon and, during the subsequent four days, located Burke and Wills' Camp B/CXIX approximately three quarters of a mile away on the Little Bynoe River. Walker's party left several blazed trees in the vicinity of his campsite beside an overflow of the Little Bynoe River.

In the early 1860s, Liddle and Hertzer established Magowra Station, which encompassed Camp B/CXIX and Walker's nearby campsite. The township of Normanton, 35 kilometres (22 mi) from Camp B/CXIX, was established in 1864 as a port and service centre for the surrounding pastoral ventures and was declared a town in 1868.

Burke and Wills' Camp B/CXIX and Walker's Camp remained "undiscovered" until 1909 when staff from Magowra Station found Walker's blazed trees and the blazed trees at Camp B/CXIX. JP Thomson, of the Queensland Geographical Society, published an article in the Queensland Geographical Journal 25th Session titled "Expedition to the Gulf of Carpentaria, 1909-10". Thomson located 15 blazed trees on this visit.

In 1999, David Hillian revisited the site and was able to relocate 10 blazed trees. Thomson's recorded Tree Number 9 is believed to have vanished in 1997 and Number 1 was destroyed in 1999. Tree Number 6 had also been removed to be housed in the Normanton Railway Museum.

== Description ==
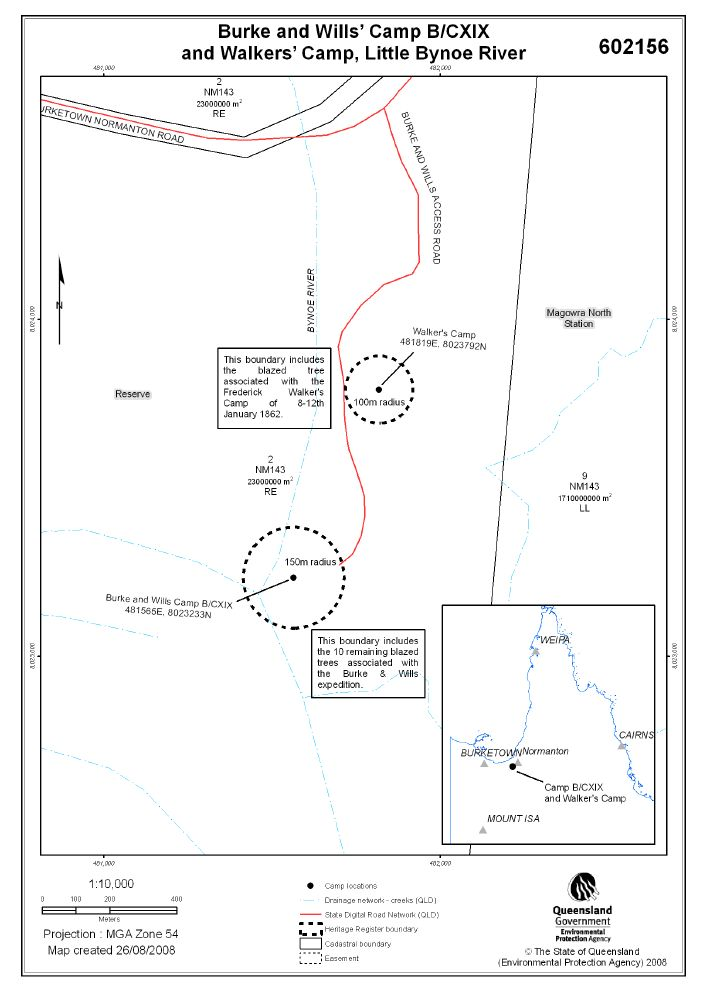
Map of Burke and Wills Camp B-CXIX and Walker's Camp

Burke and Wills' Camp B/CXIX and Walker's Camp are located 35 kilometres (22 mi) south-west of Normanton. They are about 2 kilometres (1.2 mi) south of the Normanton-Burketown Road and close to the Little Bynoe River. The sites are located above the waterline on small, seasonal overflows of the river.

Both campsites are accessible via the Burke and Wills Access Road, which runs south off the Normanton-Burketown Road. Both sites are located on unremarkable, dusty landscapes showing no evidence of the dramatic events that took place there. The Burke and Wills Camp B/CXIX is marked by signs and memorials and enclosed by a graded track. Visitors are able to bring vehicles onto the site via this track.

Burke and Wills' Camp B/CXIX is marked by the 10 remaining blazed trees made during the party's three day occupation of the site. These trees are located within the fringe of bush round the site and are not obviously tampered with. The blazing is unimposing but remains present on a number of trees at the camp sites. The fact that the blazes are not readily evident without examination has probably enabled most to survive.

Walker's Camp lies within an overflow of the Little Bynoe River. It is marked by a single blazed tree. A stainless steel plaque which reads "Walker's Camp, 8-12th Jan 1862 DNH 1998" has been fastened to the blazed tree. Visitors to this site need to walk through bush for about 500 metres (1,600 ft) to reach it.

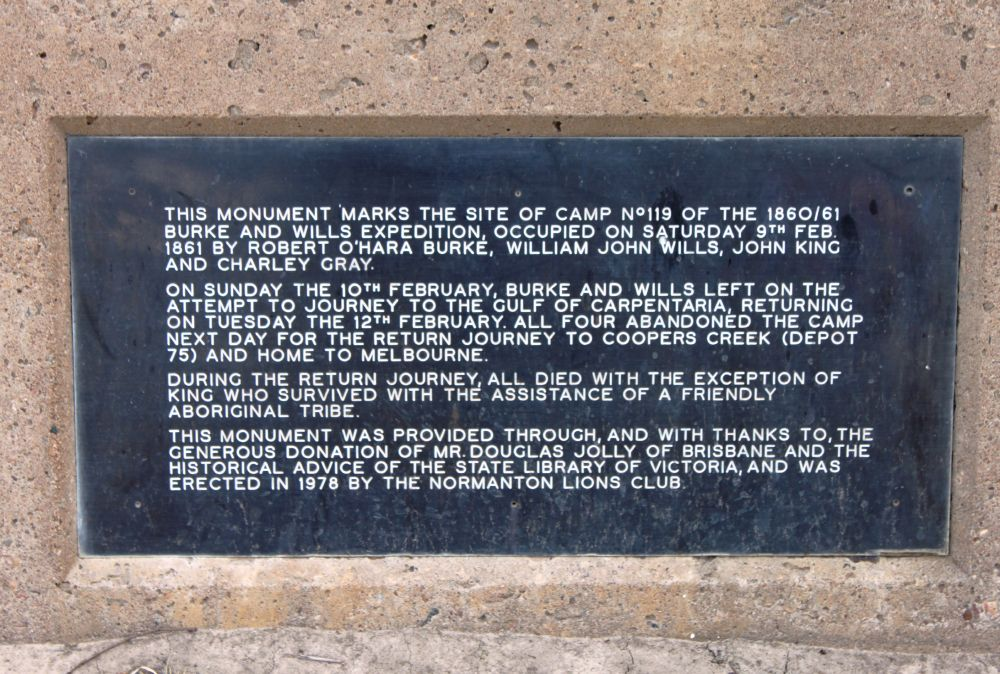
Plaque at Camp B/CXIX, 2010

Carpentaria Shire Council has completed significant signage and site protection work as part of funding received from the Community Memorial Restoration Program. Interpretative signage, bollards that protect the site and help restrict access, a protective shelter and a designated car park and access roads have all been installed on the site. None of these additions or alterations is of cultural heritage significance.

== Heritage listing ==
Burke and Wills' Camp B/CXIX and Walker's Camp, Little Bynoe River was listed on the Queensland Heritage Register on 14 August 2008 having satisfied the following criteria.

The place is important in demonstrating the evolution or pattern of Queensland's history.

The Burke and Wills' Camp B/CXIX of 11–14 February 1861 and Walker's Camp of 8–12 January 1862, adjacent to the Bynoe River in the Gulf of Carpentaria, are important in demonstrating the evolution or pattern of Queensland's history in that they reflect the nineteenth century interest in scientific exploration and the exploration of central and northern Australia. The Burke and Wills Camp B/CXIX is the most northerly marked camp established during the expedition.

Burke and Wills' Camp B/CXIX is important in demonstrating the pattern of exploration designed to "open up" the Australian continent for pastoralism. The process of pastoral expansion into a still largely unknown Gulf region of Queensland commenced soon after the expedition concluded, forever changing the region.

The place is significant to the broader Queensland and Australian community as a symbolic representation of the past in the present, providing tangible evidence of the Burke and Wills Expedition and the search effort by Walker's party that was made to locate the lost explorers. Burke and Wills' Camp B/CXIX is significant as a landmark.

The camps are also significant tangible evidence of the extent and degree to which the story of the Burke and Wills Expedition has affected the broader Queensland and Australian community.

The place demonstrates rare, uncommon or endangered aspects of Queensland's cultural heritage.

The blazed trees on both the Burke and Wills' Camp B/CXIX and Walker's Camp sites, together with the "Dig Tree" at Cooper's Creek, are rare surviving and tangible evidence of the ill-fated Burke and Wills Expedition, and also of Frederick Walker's search for the lost explorers.

The blazed trees are also rare in that they are still identifiable as belonging to an early exploration event and that they have also survived since 1861 in a remote and inhospitable landscape.

The place has potential to yield information that will contribute to an understanding of Queensland's history.

The camps are significant in that they have the potential to yield additional archaeological evidence that may add to our store of knowledge about practices and processes of nineteenth century exploration in northern Queensland and Australia.

The place has research potential, especially if other campsites from the Burke and Wills expedition are located in the future, and therefore may enable a better understanding of the hardships endured on that expedition. The place may also yield information suitable for comparative analysis with camps associated with other exploration events.

The place is important in demonstrating the principal characteristics of a particular class of cultural places.

The Burke and Wills' Camp B/CXIX and Walker's Camp are significant in illustrating a principal characteristic of early exploration in Queensland - the marking of expedition campsites with blazes to record information for future travellers. The earliness, intactness, and rarity of these blazed trees makes this place an outstanding example of its type.

The place has a special association with the life or work of a particular person, group or organisation of importance in Queensland's history.

Burke and Wills' Camp B/CXIX and Walker's Camp sites have a special association with the work of Robert O'Hara Burke, William John Wills and Frederick Walker who were key figures in nineteenth century Australian and Queensland exploration.

== See also ==
- Other heritage listings associated with the Burke and Wills expedition include:
  - Burke and Wills Dig Tree near Thargomindah, Shire of Bulloo, listed on the Queensland Heritage Register^{[27]}
  - Burke and Wills Plant Camp near Betoota, Shire of Diamantina, listed on the Queensland Heritage Register^{[28]}
- List of places associated with the Burke and Wills expedition
