= List of places associated with the Burke and Wills expedition =

- Royal Park, in Melbourne.
- Essendon and Moonee Ponds, Camp 1.
- Bulla, Camp 3.
- Lancefield, Camp 4.
- Baynton, Camp 5.
- Mia Mia, Camp 6.
- Campaspe River, Camp 8.
- Kerang, Camp 12.
- Loddon River.
- Swan Hill, Camp 15.
- Murray River, Camp 16.
- Kyalite, Camp 18.
- Balranald, Camp 20.
- Murrumbidgee River.
- Pooncarie, Camp 30.
- Darling River.
- Kinchega National Park, Camp 34A.
- Menindee, Camp 34B.
- Mutawintji National Park, Camp 40.
- Wilson River, Camp 57.
- Cooper Creek, Camp 63.
- Innamincka.
- Diamantina River, Camp 74.
- Birdsville, Queensland, Camp 76.
- Bilpa Morea (3 April 1861)
- Burke River, Camp 89.
- Boulia.
- Selwyn Ranges, Camp 99.
- Corella River, Camp 101.
- Cloncurry River, Camp 110.
- Flinders River, Camp 115.
- Gulf of Carpentaria, Camp 119.
- Burke and Wills Plant Camp
