= Benjamin Bynoe =

British ship's surgeon and naturalist (1803–1865)

Benjamin Bynoe (1803–1865) was surgeon on the voyages of HMS Beagle who made collections of plants and animals at the western and northern coasts of Australia.

Born in Barbados in 1803, Benjamin Bynoe was accepted by the Royal College of Surgeons and Royal Navy in 1825. Bynoe sailed with Charles Darwin on the second voyage of the Beagle, nursing the young scientist back to health while ill in Chile. The surgeon accompanied Darwin during expeditions, and what would be the critical research at the Galápagos Islands, making field notes that were later consulted in Darwin's research for On the Origin of Species. The collections of specimens made on these voyages were often unknown in Europe, becoming the basis of new scientific descriptions. Bynoe's name is commemorated in some of the common names and epithets of several species, such as Bynoe's gecko (Heteronotia binoei). The Bynoe River and Bynoe Bay (Bynoe Harbour) were also named for this individual.

The original volumes of Lives of Fellows at the Royal College of Surgeons gives a brief entry, "Entered the Royal Navy and retired with the rank of Staff Surgeon. He died at Old Kent Road, SE, on Nov 15th, 1865.". A more extensive biographical article was composed in 1949 using as its source a register that had avoided routine destruction of 'valueless' public records.
