= Bynoe River =

River in Queensland, Australia

Coordinates: 17°30′S 140°44′E

The Bynoe River, also called the Little Bynoe River, is an arm of the Flinders River delta in the Gulf of Carpentaria. It is of significant historical interest as the point where the Burke and Wills expedition, an expedition seeking to cross Australia from south to north and return, reached salt water in 1861. The mouth of the river was the explorers' Burke and Wills Camp B/CXIX, with 'CXIX' being the Roman numerals for 119.

The river was named for Benjamin Bynoe, a surgeon and naturalist on HMS Beagle. The river's mouth is adjacent to Normanton, Queensland. The river and mouth should not be confused with Bynoe Harbour in the Northern Territory.
