= Wannaminta Station =

Pastoral lease in New South Wales

Wannaminta Station is a cattle station located at 30°15′16″S 142°00′06″E in far western New South Wales. The area includes Bullea Lake and Green Lake and the Silver City Highway.

During the early 1920s the property was owned by the Morden Pastoral Company and had an area of million and a quarter acres.

Wannaminta was owned by Sidney Kidman and managed by Jack Watt.
