= Burke and Wills Plant Camp =

- Location within Queensland Location within Australia
- 25.1526°S 139.866°E
- Location: Near Betoota, Shire of Diamantina, Queensland, Australia

History
- Design period: 1840s–1860s (mid-19th century)

Queensland Heritage Register
- Official name: Burke and Wills "Plant Camp", Return Camp 46, Buke and Wills Camp R46
- Type: protected area (archaeological)
- Designated: 11 December 2008
- Reference no.: 645622
- Significant period: 1861
- Significant components: blazed tree/dig tree/marker tree, artefact field

Burke and Wills Plant Camp is a heritage-listed campsite near Betoota within the locality of Birdsville, Shire of Diamantina, Queensland, Australia. It is also known as Return Camp 46 and Burke and Wills Camp R46. It was added to the Queensland Heritage Register on 11 December 2008.

== History ==
The Burke and Wills Plant Camp on Durrie Station is associated with explorers Robert O'Hara Burke and William John Wills. On the 3 April 1861, on their return trip from the Gulf of Carpentaria, the Burke and Wills expedition was approximately 100 kilometres (62 mi) north of the present day Birdsville. That evening Wills made his last astronomical observations and then "planted" his instruments and associated equipment, presumably in a shallow hole, on an unnamed creek near return camp XLVI (also known Camp R46 or Plant Camp). This return trip was a desperate race to reach their depot camp number LXV - the site of the famous Dig Tree located close to the border with South Australia and near the present Nappa Merrie Homestead.

In 2010, a student of the University of Queensland, Nick Hadnutt, published his Honours thesis which undertook a detailed analysis of artefacts found at the site when compared with the known dates of the expedition using primary and secondary sources to confirm the authenticity of the site. The thesis concluded that the site was indeed Burke and Wills Camp 46R.

== Description ==
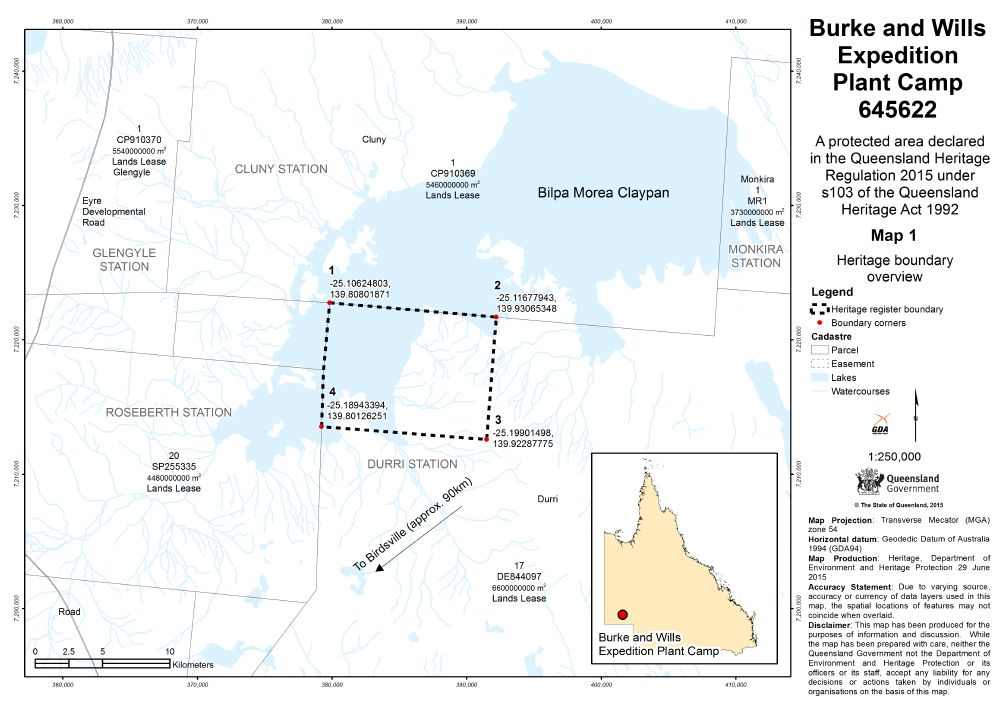
Boundary map, 2015

The Burke and Wills Plant Camp site is located on an unnamed creek on Durrie station, approximately two hours drive north of Birdsville. The archaeological record of the Plant Camp has two key components in two different locations. The majority of the European artefacts found to date were located at the terminus of the intermittent unnamed creek and a claypan. Artefacts have been found all along the unnamed creek in varying concentrations. All artefacts are located within the influence of the drainage pattern of the unnamed creek, however artefacts are mostly found on the high points within this local environment. The depth of the artefacts also varies with the majority being found close to the surface or within the top 10–20 millimetres (0.39–0.79 in) of soil.

A number of artefacts have been collected by a number of researchers who have visited the site including canvas/leather sewing kit needles, thrust block, duck bill leather sewing pliers, percussion cap, nipples and bullets consistent with the calibre, vintage and make of weapons taken on the Burke and Wills Expedition. These artefacts have been compared with the "List of Stores III" from the expedition and found to be consistent with goods that were officially supplied.

The remainder of the site consists of two scarred trees located 2 kilometres (1.2 mi) and 2.7 kilometres (1.7 mi) east along the creek from the main artefact concentration. The origin of the scars on these trees remains unknown, but it is possible that these are the remains of blazes associated with the Burke and Wills expedition, providing a visible marker for the location of the Plant Camp for other explorers, or in the case of this expedition, to any potential rescuers.

Evidence of indiscriminate looting of archaeological artefacts is visible throughout the Plant Camp site. More extensive excavations have also been undertaken at the base of the two scarred trees thought to be associated with the Burke and Wills expedition. Both tree locations show evidence of extensive shovel testing or turning of soil - presumably the digger was searching for buried instruments of other artefacts. Ongoing disturbance is a key threat facing Plant Camp as the process of retrieving surface artefacts without sufficient concern for their provenance and the indiscriminate digging up of artefacts removes them from their archaeological context and thus limits our ability to obtain reliable information about the Burke and Wills expedition.

== Heritage listing ==
Burke and Wills "Plant Camp" was listed on the Queensland Heritage Register on 11 December 2008 having satisfied the following criteria.

The Burke and Wills Plant Camp is significant in demonstrating the evolution or pattern of Queensland's history as evidence of the nineteenth century interest in scientific exploration. The Burke and Wills expedition, and the subsequent search parties sent to find the lost explorers, contributed to the opening up of Queensland and large portions of inland Australia to pastoralism. The process of pastoral expansion commenced soon after the expedition concluded. Expansion into the largely unknown areas of western Queensland and the gulf forever changed these regions.

The Plant Camp is significant as a representation of the past in the present, providing tangible evidence of the first overland north-south crossing of the continent from settled areas in Victoria through Queensland to the Gulf of Carpentaria covering a distance of around 2,800 kilometres (1,700 mi). The place was the final camp established by the explorers and is representative of a key stage in the expedition when Burke and Wills decided to abandon most of their equipment.

The Plant Camp is significant for its potential to contain additional archaeological artefacts associated with the Burke and Wills expedition, particularly equipment associated with Wills' decision to "plant" or bury his astronomical equipment and Burke's order to leave behind everything except food and whatever they could carry on their backs. The Plant Camp has been identified through the presence of archaeological artefacts and two blazed trees situated along an unnamed ephemeral creek line on Durrie Station. Artefacts located to date include percussion caps, nipples, buckles, canvas/leather sewing kit needles, thrust block and duck bill leather sewing pliers a number of the brass fittings, including a clasp, escutcheon, latch and hinge all suggestive of a possible instrument case. These artefacts date to the same period (c. 1850s-1860s) as the Burke and Wills expedition and are consistent with items listed in the detailed "List of Stores III" of goods officially supplied to the expedition.

Plant Camp is significant for its research potential, especially future comparative analysis of archaeological artefacts with others documented at other Burke and Wills campsites. Comparative analysis could provide new and important information on the decisions made by the explorers throughout the expedition, including the rationing of supplies and the value placed on certain objects and items in their possession. For example, scientific analysis may reveal evidence as to why the explorers kept certain scientific instruments and abandoned more practical and useful items which could have increased their chances of success and ultimately survival. Comparative analysis of Plant Camp archaeological artefacts with other early exploration sites across Queensland may also benefit our understanding and knowledge of the conduct of those exploration events.

The Plant Camp has potential to substantiate or challenge documented accounts and myths surrounding the final days of the Burke and Wills expedition. Documentary evidence is limited to that provided in William Wills' journals and to that recorded by the Commission of Enquiry for the expedition held in 1862. Additional archaeological research at the Plant Camp may lead to a greater understanding of the reasons behind the ultimate failure of the expedition and enable a better understanding of the hardships endured by the explorers during the expedition.

The Plant Camp is significant for its special association with prominent Australian explorers Robert O'Hara Burke and William John Wills, who both died during the return journey in 1861.
