= Betoota, Queensland =

Betoota
- Town
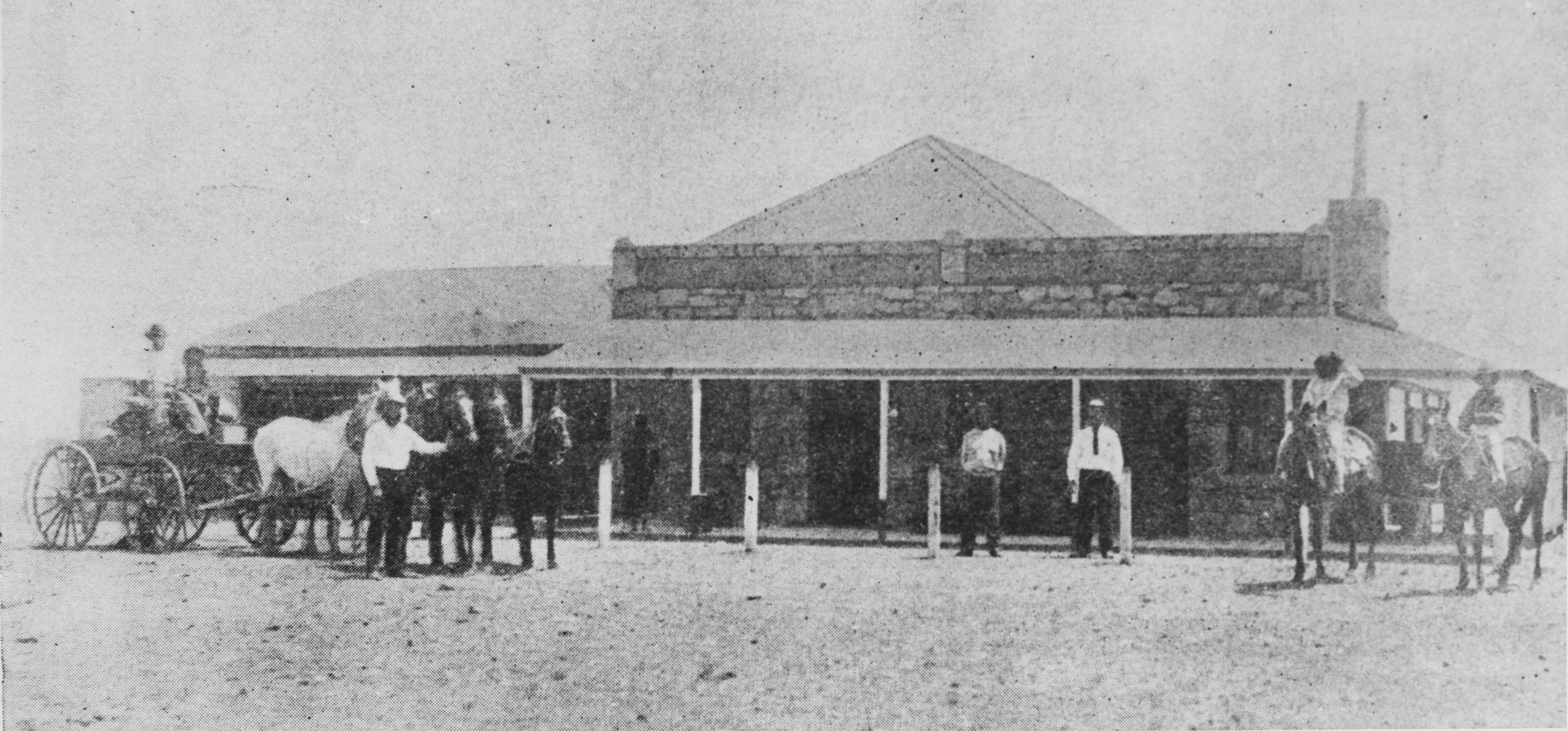
- Store in Betoota, 1903

- Coordinates: 25.6944°S 140.7442°E
- Country: Australia
- State: Queensland
- LGA: Shire of Diamantina
- Location: 166 km (103 mi) E of Birdsville; 276 km (171 mi) SE of Bedourie; 677 km (421 mi) W of Charleville; 1,330 km (830 mi) NNE of Adelaide; 1,424 km (885 mi) W of Brisbane
- Established: 1887

Government
  - State electorate: Gregory
  - Federal division: Maranoa

Population
  - Total: 3 (2023)
- Postcode: 4482

Betoota is a ghost town within the locality of Birdsville, in the Shire of Diamantina, in the Channel Country of Central West Queensland, Australia. Betoota is situated on a gibber plain (a stony desert plain) 170 kilometres (110 mi) east of Birdsville and 227 kilometres (141 mi) west of Windorah.

The only facilities in Betoota are a racetrack, a dry weather airstrip, a cricket field, and the Betoota Hotel. Visitors are drawn to the town during the annual Simpson Desert Carnival which is held in September.

== History ==
Karuwali (also known as Garuwali, Dieri) is a language of far western Queensland. The Karuwali language region includes the landscape within the local government boundaries of the Diamantina Shire Council, including the localities of Betoota and Haddon Corner.

The town was surveyed in 1887, but only three streets were ever named. The Betoota Hotel was constructed in the late 1880s and is the last remaining building in town outside the race track. The building is constructed of sandstone and has timber floors.

In 1885, the Queensland Government opened a customs post to collect a toll for stock travelling the stock route. Betoota was once a Cobb & Co change station.

In 1895, a police presence was established in the town as construction of a rabbit-proof fence in the region was attracting many "undesirable characters" to the town. A police station with a court was built in 1915 but was closed in 1930 because an inspection in 1928 found no-one had been taken into custody or placed before the court in more than five years.

The hotel operated until 1997, when its owner, Sigmund (Simon) Remienko, retired at 82 years of age. Originally from Poland, Remienko worked as a grader driver until he bought the Betoota Hotel in 1957. He owned it for 47 years, and was Betoota's sole resident until ill-health forced him to move. The hotel closed in October 1997. Remienko died in 2004.

In 2017, Robert Haken, a smash repairer from Logan, bought the long-defunct hotel from the couple Remienko had left it to. It was being restored, with the aim of reopening in time for the Betoota Races in August 2018. However, that goal was not achieved, "due to paperwork". The Betoota Hotel re-opened on 20 July 2020.

== Education ==
There are no schools in Betoota. The alternatives are distance education and boarding school.

== Heritage listings ==
Betoota has a number of heritage-listed sites, including a protected area known as Burke and Wills "Plant Camp".

== Popular culture ==
The town's name has been used by the Australian satirical news website and digital media company The Betoota Advocate, although the company is actually based in Sydney. It purports to be "Australia's oldest newspaper".

== See also ==
- List of ghost towns
