= Arthur Stanley Wohlmann =

English physician and balneologist (1867–1943)

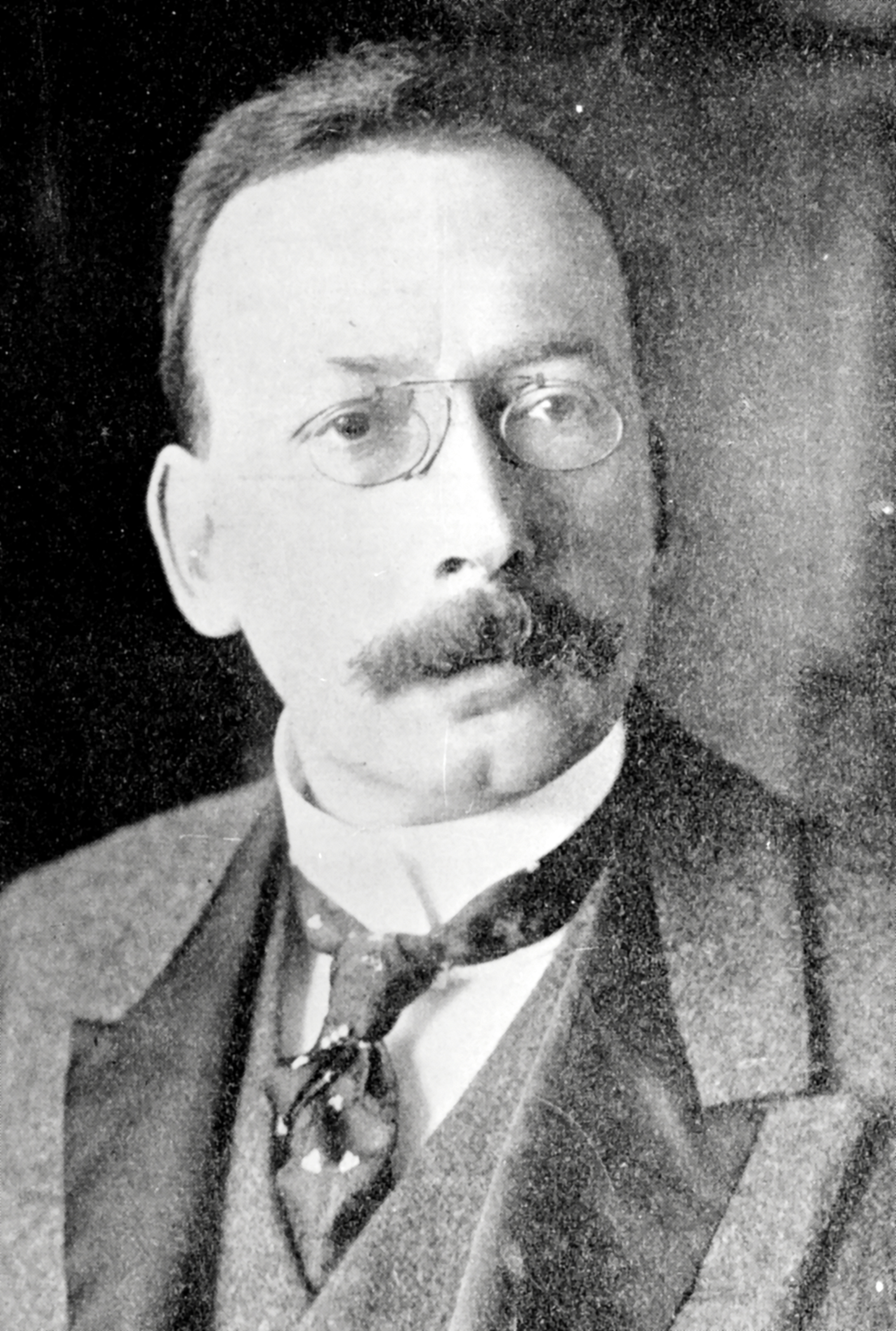
- Wohlman in 1902
- Born: 3 October 1867; Hertford
- Died: 3 March 1944 (aged 76); Richmond
- Occupation: Physician

Arthur Stanley Wohlmann (1867–1943), also known as Arthur Stanley Herbert, was an English physician and balneologist, known for his significant contributions to the therapeutic use of the spa in New Zealand. Born in London, he qualified as a dentist in 1894 and moved to New Zealand in 1902. Wohlmann was appointed as the first government balneologist in Rotorua, where he played a pivotal role in developing the town into a renowned spa destination.

His work included the design and supervision of various therapeutic facilities, promoting the health benefits of the spa. Wohlmann's efforts were instrumental in attracting both local and international visitors to Rotorua, boosting its reputation and economy. He also published extensively on the therapeutic properties of hot springs, contributing valuable knowledge to the field of balneology.

Wohlmann's influence extended beyond Rotorua as he consulted on similar projects in other regions. He retired in 1935 but continued to be involved in balneology until his death in 1943. His legacy is marked by his dedication to advancing the scientific and therapeutic use of geothermal resources.

== Biography ==
Trained in London and having practiced balneotherapy for several years in the renowned spa town of Bath, he was chosen in 1902 by the government of New Zealand, shortly after that country had been the first to set up a government tourism agency, to be the colony's official balneologist. This title, which at first aroused astonishment, reflected the economic importance attributed to the development of New Zealand spa tourism and the hope of attracting an influx of international curists, drawn by the beauty and virtues of the North Island's thermal zone.

Wohlmann enthusiastically took on the task of surveying the springs and promoting them, notably by producing brochures and exhibitions. His priority, however, was the development of the Rotorua site, where he aimed to build an international spa. The latter, inaugurated in 1908, boasts a level of luxury and equipment unrivaled in the southern hemisphere. Although the site is still world-famous today, this major investment did not bear the fruit hoped for at the time. This was mainly due to the remoteness of the country and despite the innovations introduced by Wohlmann, including a dangerous radioactive cure. It eventually fell into disrepair, eaten away by sulfurous fumes.

Despite some of the errors typical of the medical concepts of the time, Wohlmann brought a scientific and holistic approach to the practice of thermalism, the latter being particularly in tune with the government's tourist propaganda, thanks to the importance attached to a change of scenery.

== Context ==
In the 19th century, the development of tourism was closely linked to that of the spa. During the period, most European countries and the United States experienced the "spa fever", with the expansion or launch of spas and their provision of prestigious tourist facilities to satisfy the growing demand for hydrotherapy cures and mineral water consumption.

In 1874, William Fox recommended that the New Zealand Government follow the American example of Yellowstone National Park, created in 1872, and intervene to protect the spa areas of the North Island. He suggested the creation in this region of "a sanatorium not only for the Australian colonies but also for India and other parts of the globe". The project began to be implemented in 1881 with the passing of the Thermal-Springs Districts Act, which gave the Crown the right to purchase land offered for sale in the area. In 1886, a small private sanatorium was opened in Rotorua. In 1888, it was destroyed by fire and rebuilt by the government in 1889 as a "national institution", under the management of Dr. Alfred Ginders.

In 1894, the opening of a railroad line between Auckland and Rotorua boosted the number of visitors to the spa area and the Rotorua sanatorium. In 1895, the New Zealand press reported that the government was dissatisfied with Dr. Ginders' management, that he would soon be sent to Rotorua to analyze the mineral waters, and that an "experienced balneologist" should be sought in Europe. In 1896, in a parliamentary report on the state of hospitals, Duncan MacGregor recommended a radical reorganization of the organization of spa treatments to cope with the foreseeable growth in demand for spa treatments, and in particular the recruitment of a "medical expert in balneology with competence and experience in the field". That same year, the government asked the colony's agent-general in London, William Pember Reeves, to search Europe for such a balneologist to run New Zealand's thermal baths. According to Reeves, the position required the combined skills of a physician, chemist, engineer, and hotelier.

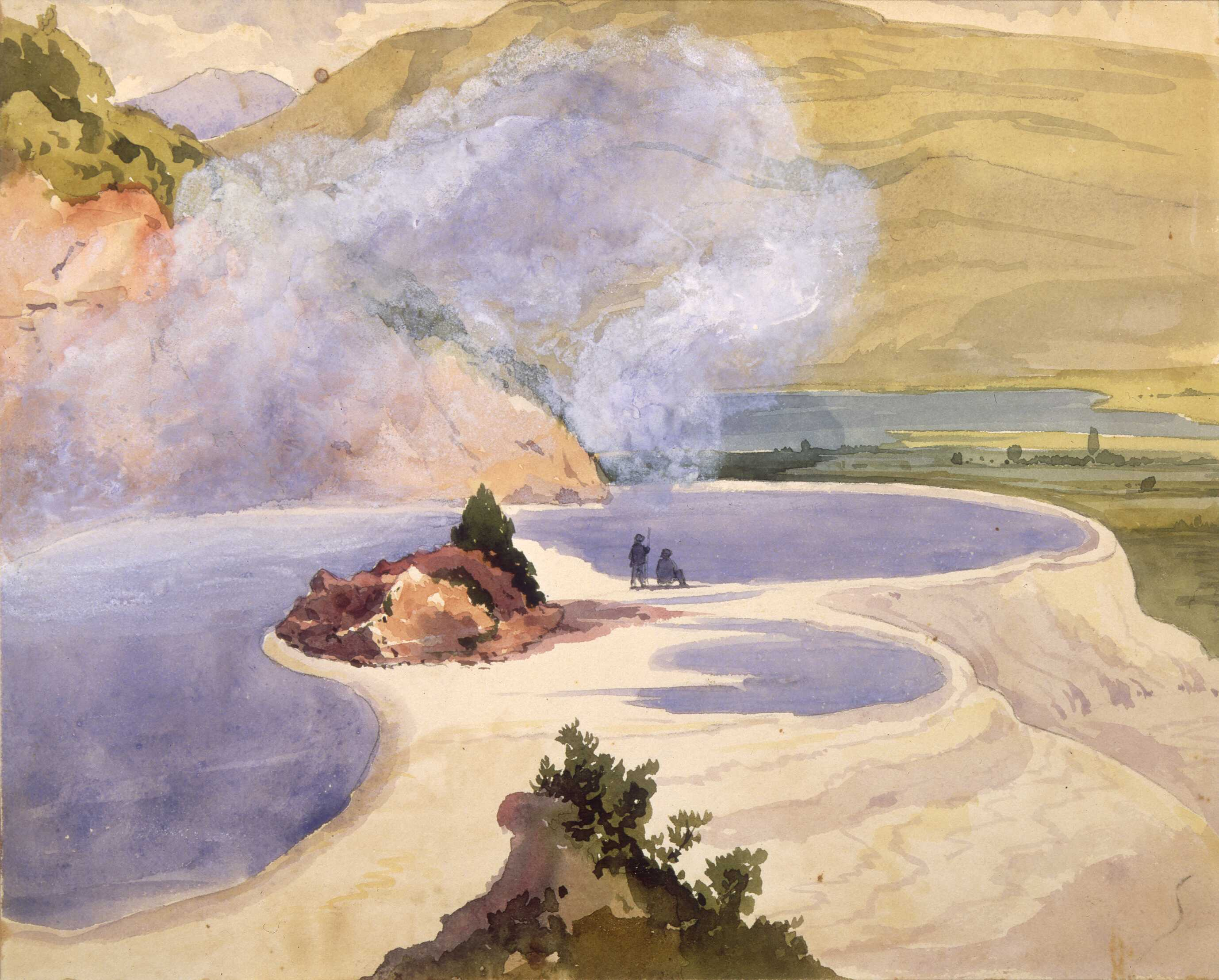
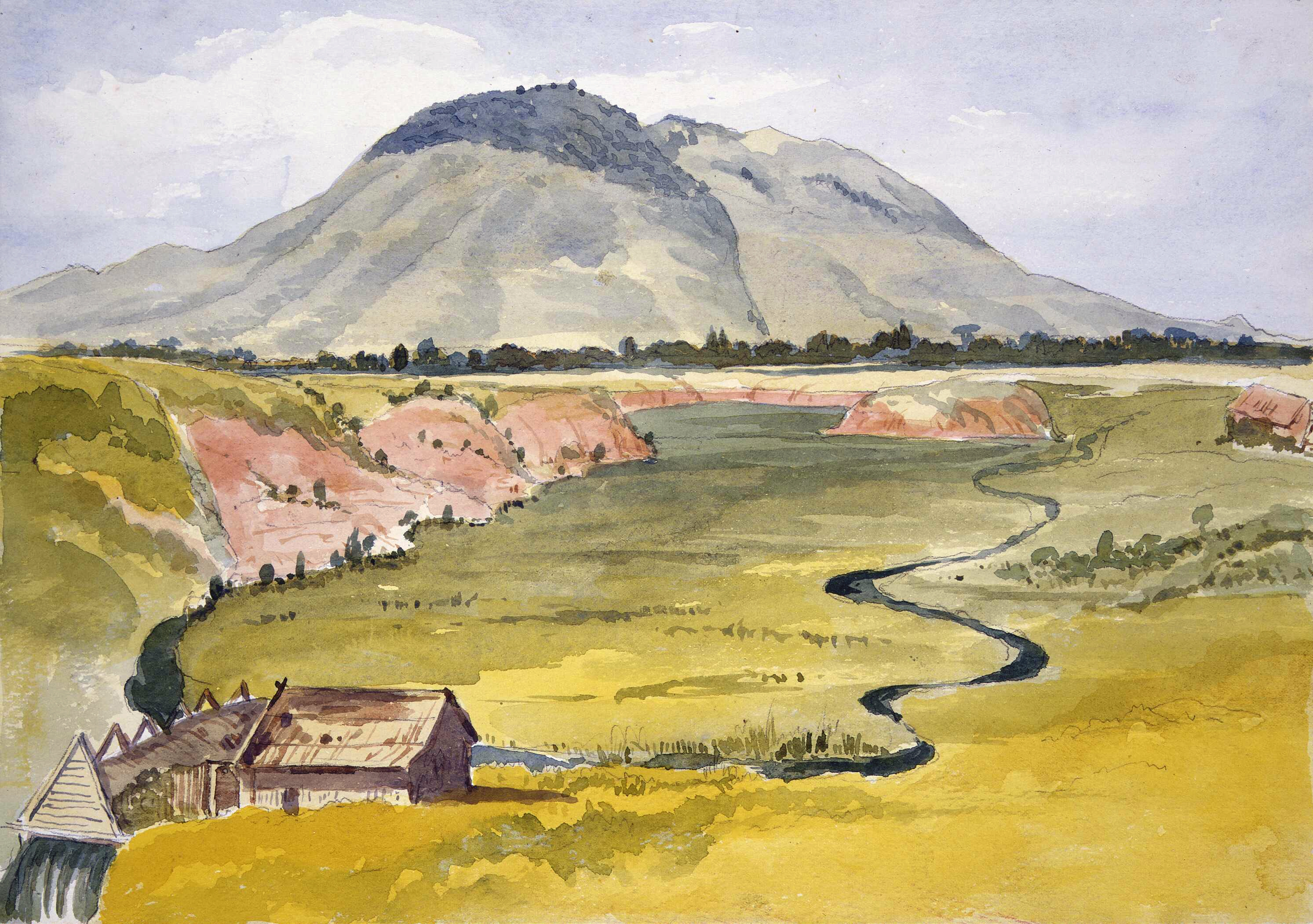
Two watercolours by William Fox. The first, circa 1864, depicts hot-water pools in the White Terraces, a natural wonder destroyed by a volcanic eruption in 1886; the second, from 1874, shows a bath near Taupō, illustrating a report submitted to the Prime Minister on the prospects for exploiting thermal resources.

Balneology was introduced into the New Zealand political landscape in 1897. In October, during parliamentary debates on the budget, the allocation of a £1,000 line for the annual salary and expenses of a balneologist – a large sum reflecting the national importance of the function – was denounced by the opposition as a "gross extravagance". It attracted criticism from some of the press: while the Otago Witness assumed that the term referred to the North Island's hot springs, the Ohinemuri Gazette suggested that the role of a balneologist would be to show patients how to locate whales in the warm waters of Lake Rotorua; the Daily Telegraph regarded the choice of the term as a form of offensiveness designed to conceal the nature of the tasks involved; and the Observer suggested that, as the necessary "expertise" seemed easy to acquire, the post could easily be awarded to a local resident.

By 1898, Reeves met Dr. Karl Grube, head physician at the Bad Neuenahr spa clinic and known for his "young, energetic personality, extensive experience of thermal springs and thorough knowledge of the subject". He was fluent in English and treated celebrities such as the Prince of Fürstenberg and the Duchess of Teck, who he hoped would tempt them to come and experience the thermal benefits of New Zealand. However, Grube requested, in addition to the £800 annual salary he had been offered, the right to charge for private consultations, which the government refused.

== Formative years ==
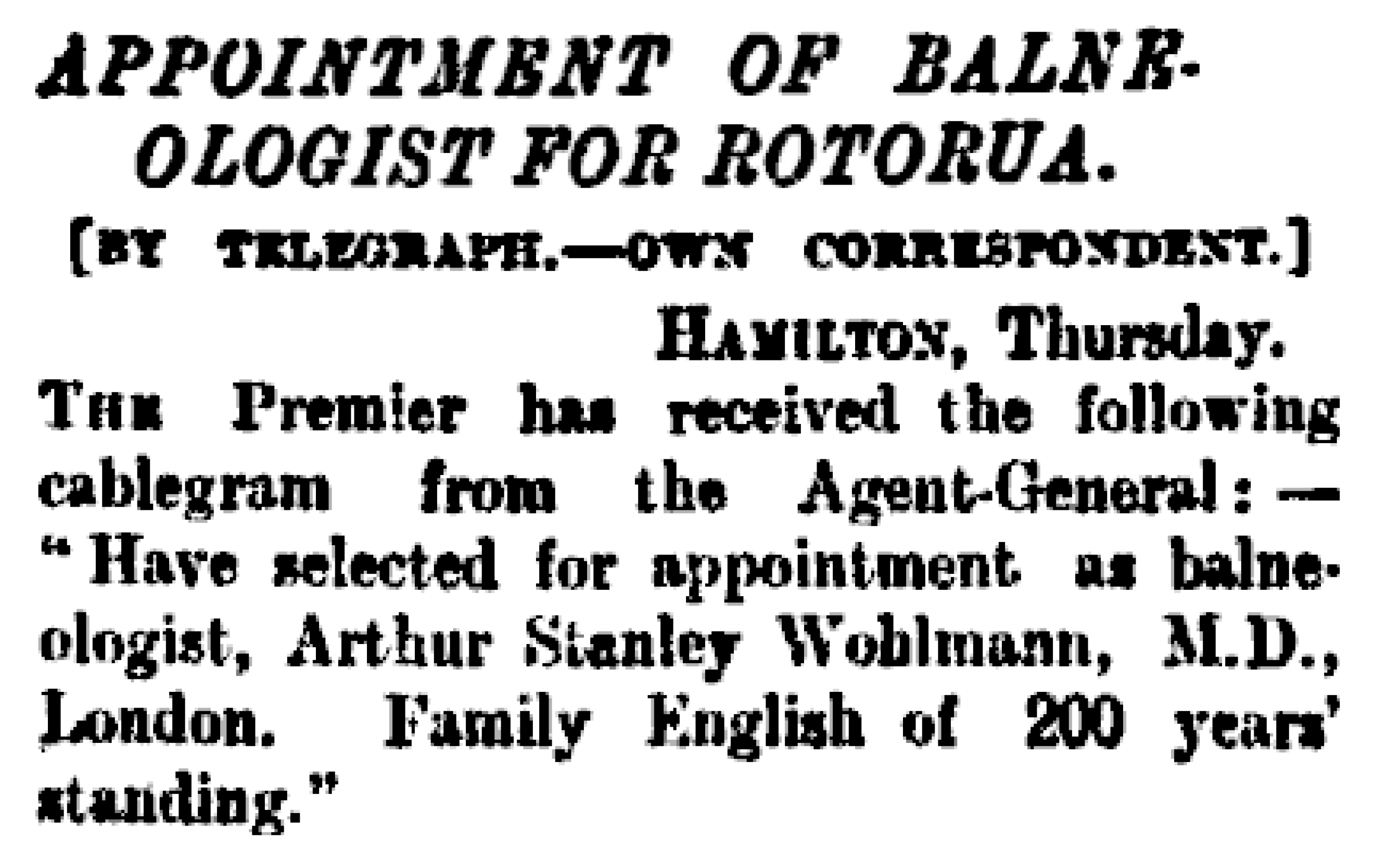
Announcement of Wohlmann's nomination.

In March 1902, several New Zealand newspapers announced the nomination of Arthur Stanley Wohlmann to the post of government balneologist, often mentioning a decisive fact: despite his Teutonic-sounding name, he came from a family that had been "English for two hundred years".

Born on March 3, 1867, in Hertford, where he attended secondary school, Wohlmann began his medical studies in 1885 at Guy's Hospital in London, graduating in 1892. After practicing in the city, he spent four months as a surgeon at the British hospital in Port Saïd, then spent two years as a resident physician at the Royal Mineral Water Hospital in Bath, where he treated rheumatoid arthritis, before setting up his practice in the city renowned for its spa treatments. Over six years, he developed a balneotherapy practice, in which he was recognized for his considerable experience, particularly in the use of electricity. In 1896, Wohlmann co-authored a noteworthy article on rheumatoid arthritis which defended the hypothesis, since abandoned, of a bacterial origin for this disease, and in 1899 published an article on rheumatic diseases. In 1899, he married Eugenia Madden, widow of a colonel in the Indian Army, with whom he had a daughter aged three when he arrived in New Zealand. In choosing him from 43 applicants, the New Zealand government hoped to capitalize on his experience and reputation with Bath's wealthy spa clientele. His credentials were published in the first report of the Tourism Development Agency set up in 1901. However, before setting sail for New Zealand, he was asked to spend two weeks touring Europe's leading spas to assess their strengths and weaknesses. In his report on the subject, he analyzes the factors contributing to their success, such as their plans, the materials used, and their resistance to degradation, as well as the different types of equipment and treatments.

== Government balneology ==
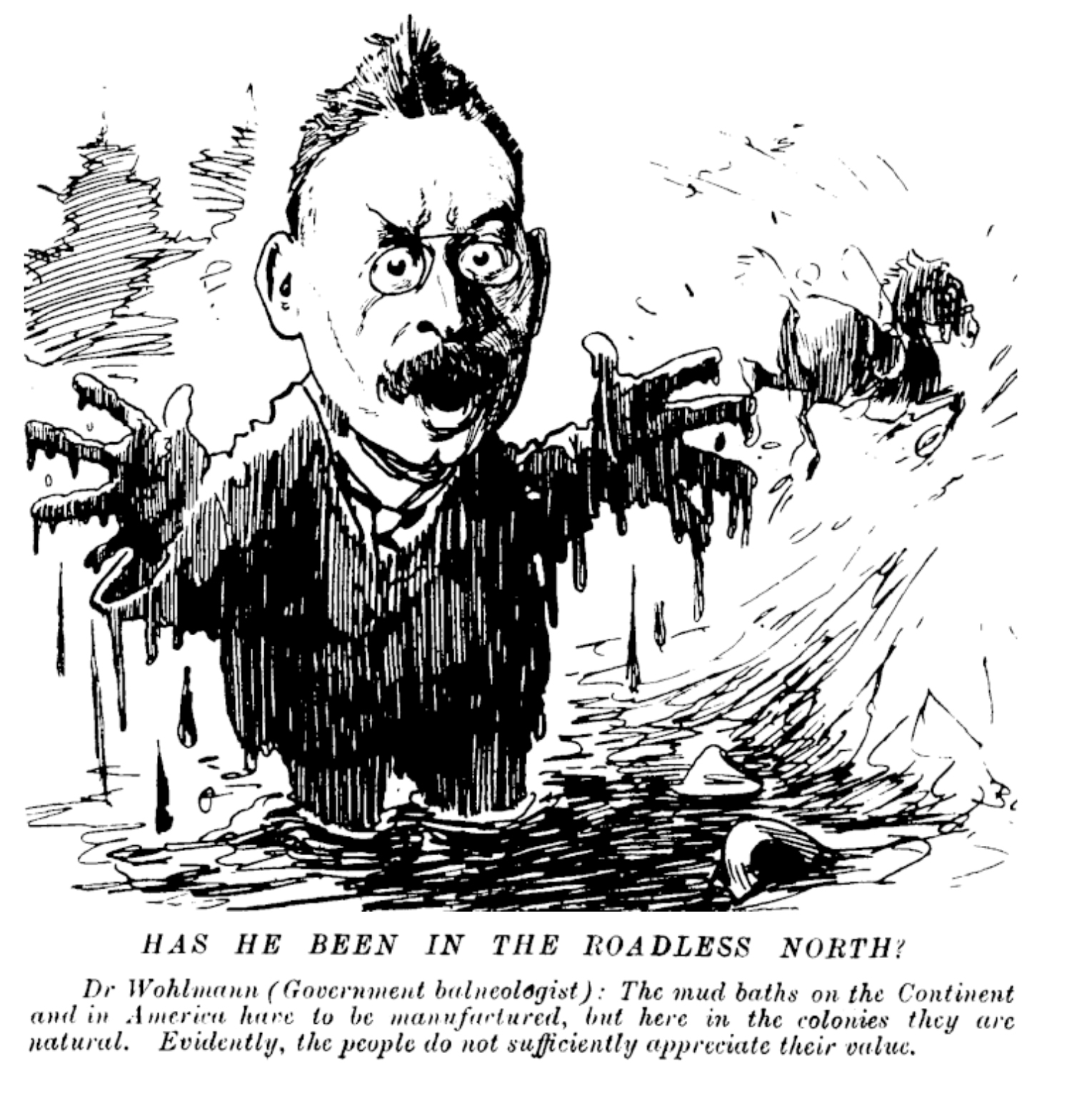
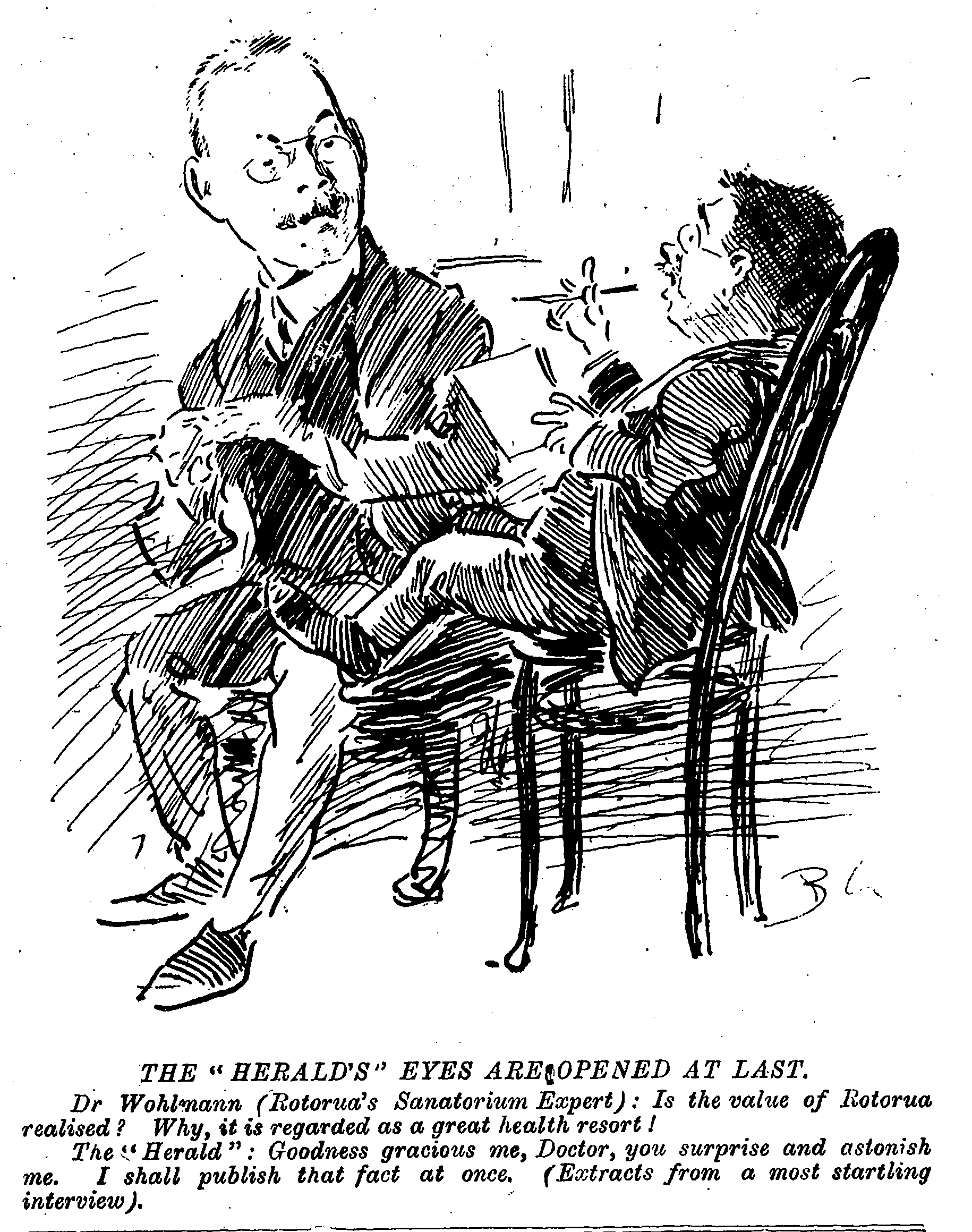
Two press cartoons by Wohlmann extolling New Zealand's spa resources. In the first (1902), the mud baths; in the second (1912), the benefits of Rotorua.

Shortly after arriving in New Zealand in July 1902 and establishing his residence in Rotorua, Wohlmann undertook inspection visits to the colony's thermal springs, in particular those at Waiotapu, Wairakei, Orakei Korako, Taupō, Tokaanu, Okoroire, Te Aroha, Helensville, Morere and Hanmer, taking water samples, which he had analyzed by the Colonial Museum laboratory in Wellington, to select the sites he recommended for development.

In the report he submitted at the end of this first tour, he expressed both enthusiasm and caution, stating that "nature has endowed [New Zealand] with thermal springs with prodigality, but the very abundance of these gifts makes [his] task all the more difficult [and that] to do justice [to all the springs in this country] would require an enormous and unjustifiable expense". As a priority, he recommended the development of Rotorua, which boasted thermal water of "almost unique quality in almost inexhaustible quantities", an "invigorating" climate, an established reputation and rail access; but also, as a secondary priority, the development of Te Aroha, for its drinkable mineral waters, and Hanmer, for "the invalids [of the South Island] who could not undertake the long journey to Rotorua".

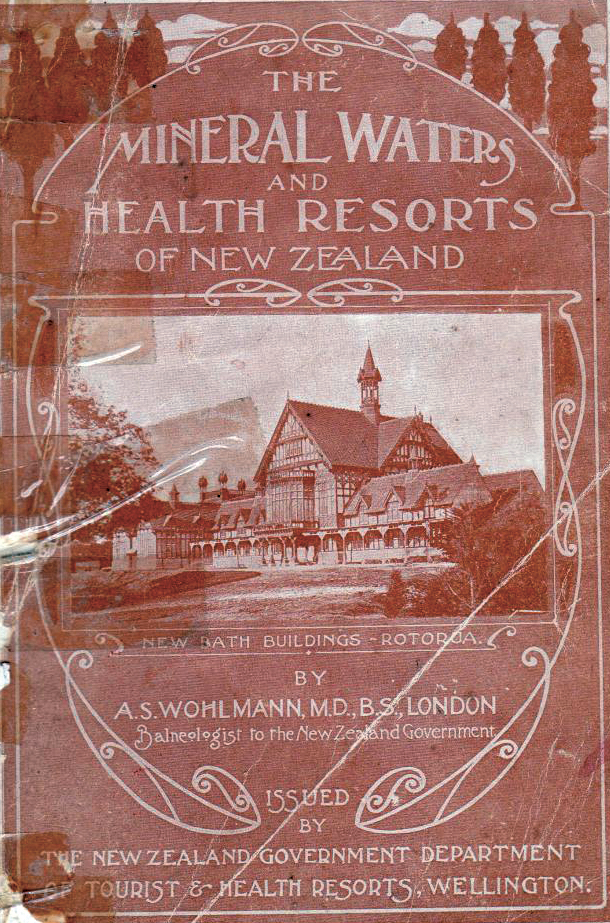
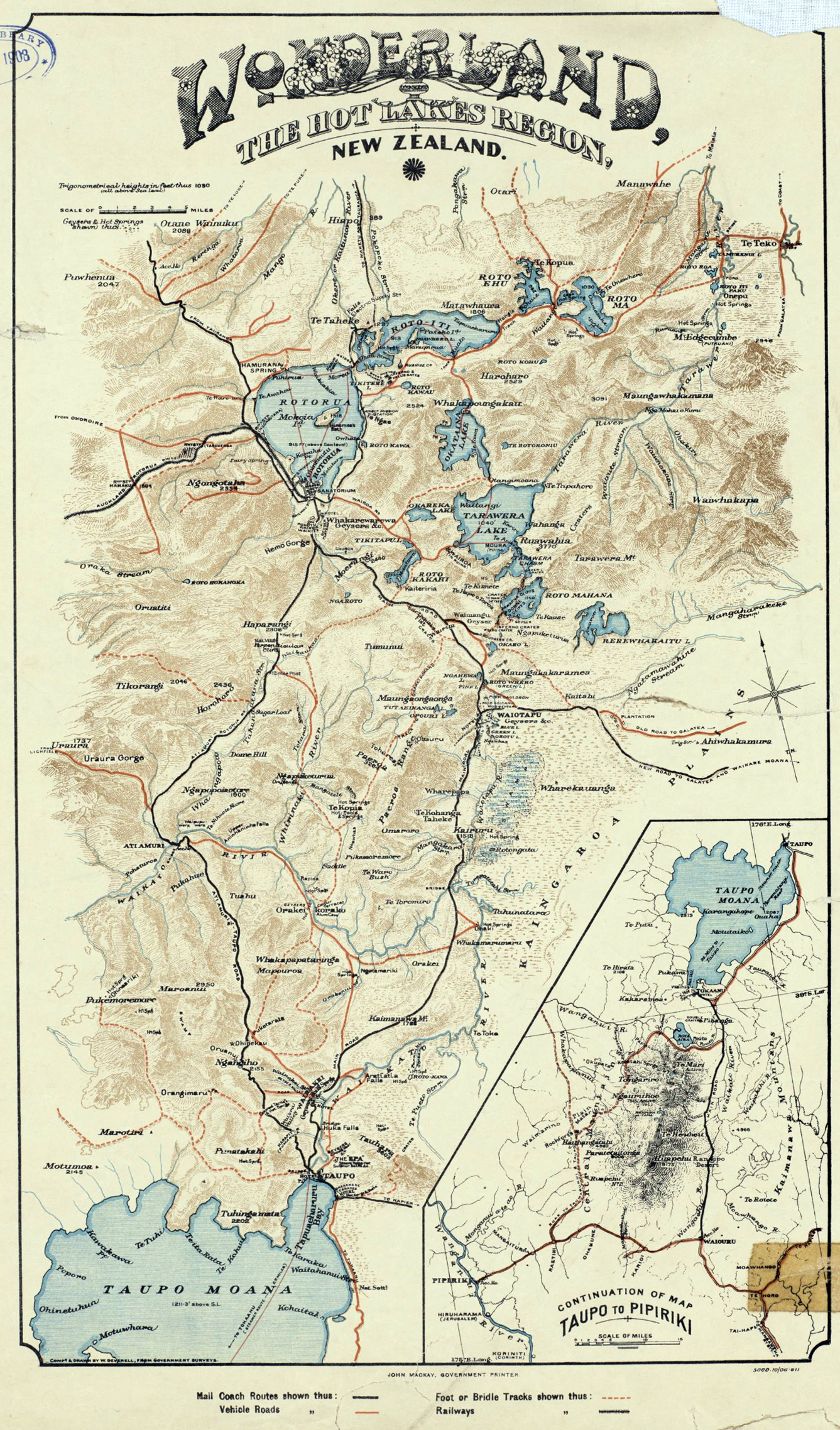
Cover of the 1907 edition of The Mineral Waters and Health Resorts of New Zealand, Wohlmann's brochure distributed by the government tourism agency, and tourist map of spa regions (1903).

In 1903, Wohlmann began writing a guide to the mineral waters of New Zealand, intended both for patients and the medical profession. In 1904, he published the first part devoted to the waters of Rotorua, in which meteorological tables and chemical analyses supplied by the colonial laboratory are complemented by considerations of the curative virtues attributed to these waters and the distractions offered by the region to curists. The work was gradually supplemented with information on other sites, with pagination increasing from 48 pages in 1904 to 82 pages in 1907 and 155 pages in 1914. These publications were part of a strategy developed by Donne, the director of the tourism promotion department, to present New Zealand as a "thermal wonderland" and a "cureland", the spa par excellence of the southern hemisphere. According to Peter Hodder, the ambiguous status of Wohlmann's publications, which simultaneously aim to provide scientific data on the composition of the waters and more conjectural information on their alleged virtues, while at the same time addressing a readership of potential tourists and health-care professionals, results in a mixture between compilations of chemical analyses and subjective assessments of the waters' gustatory or curative qualities. Wohlmann made favorable comparisons between New Zealand's mineral waters and those of Europe's most famous spas. Te Aroha's, for example, had a higher proportion of sodium bicarbonate than Vichy's, making it "the strongest alkaline thermal water in the world". However, these analyses will later be called into question when it emerges that the same waters are also rich in arsenic and boron.

In 1906, Wohlmann was entrusted with organizing part of the Tourism Department's section at the Christchurch International Exhibition. Responding to visitors' expectations of spectacular attractions at the time, Wohlmann designed and built a "wonderfully accurate copy of some of the most remarkable features of the thermal regions [... where,] after passing through a portal surrounded by carved Maori totem poles, the visitor is immediately transported to the land of soufrières, wai-arikis [hot springs], geysers and fumaroles". This ingenious and faithful miniature recreation of "geyserland" was inaugurated by the Prime Minister, Joseph Ward, and earned Wohlmann his congratulations.

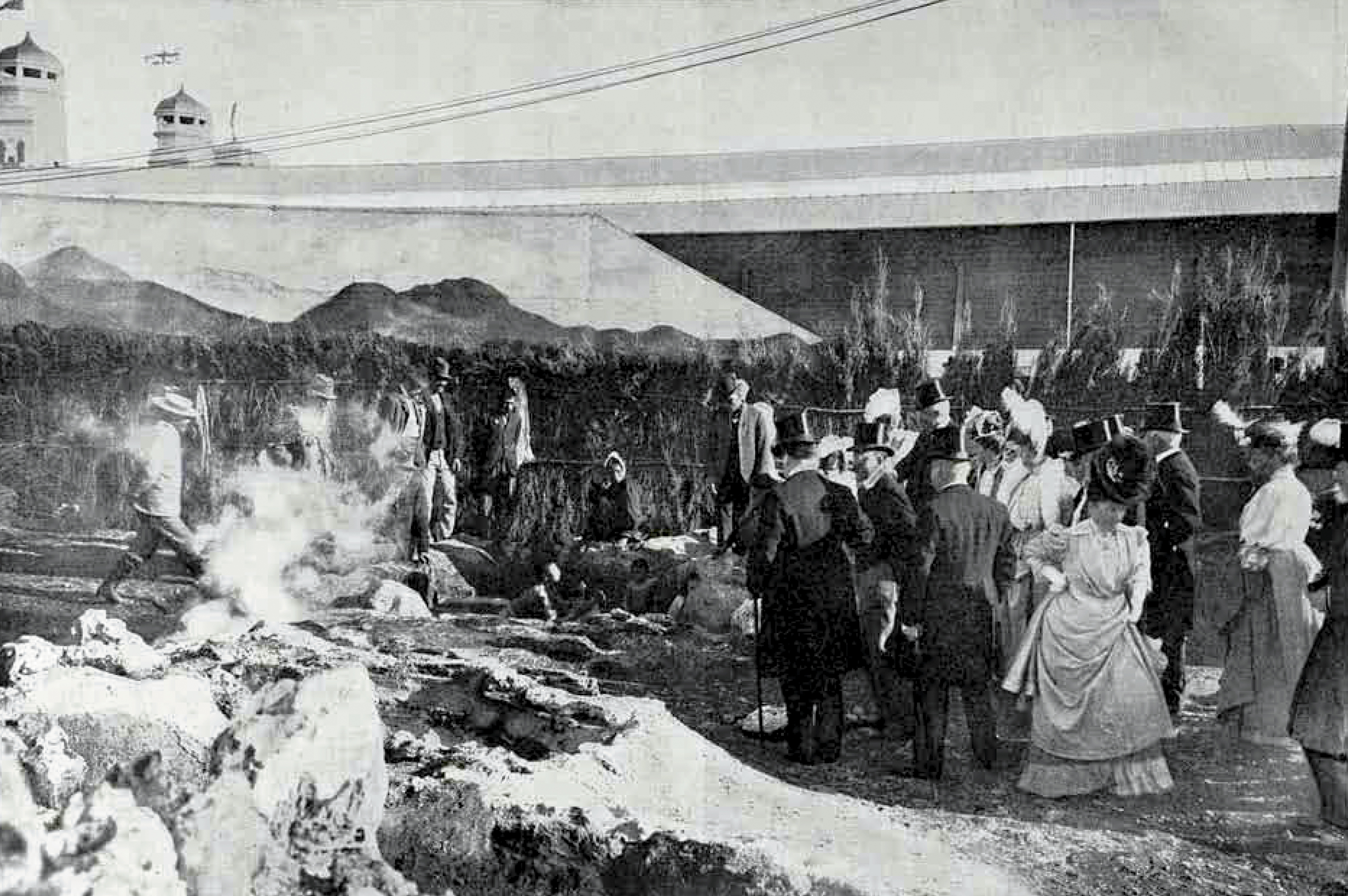
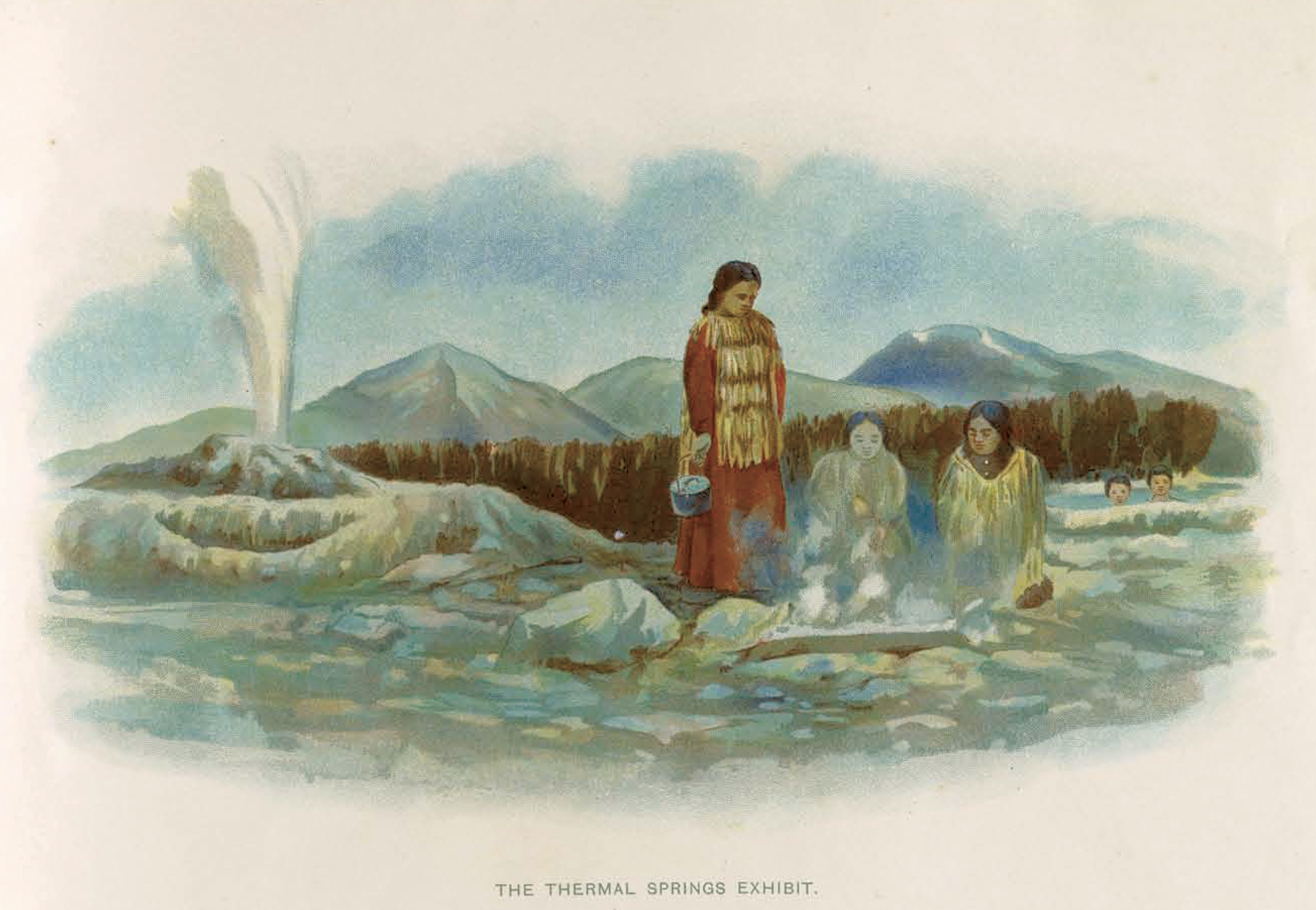
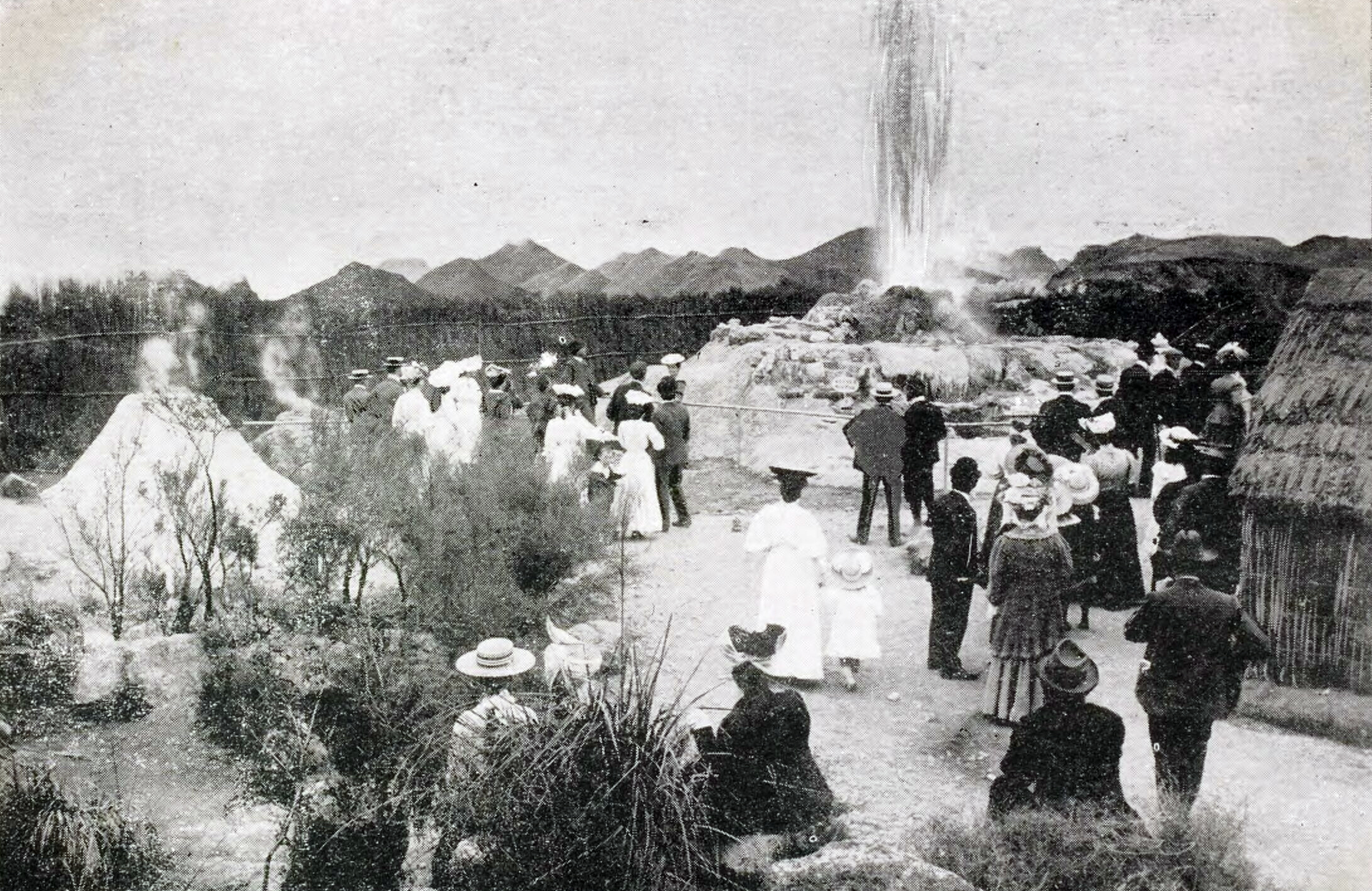
Christchurch International Exhibition, 1906. On the left, Wohlmann presents his project to Prime Minister Joseph Ward at the inauguration. Center, illustration from the exhibition booklet showing Maori women cooking their food with steam. Right, souvenir postcard showing a geyser and miniature fumarole cones.

== Development of Rotorua ==
Soon after he arrived in Rotorua, Wohlmann decided on the development strategy he would constantly recommend to the authorities: to prioritize the developing the local spa facilities into the largest spa in the southern hemisphere. He points to the economic benefits that can be expected from such a development: "If, through increased attractions, we can attract a thousand more visitors, we can expect a million more pounds to be spent in the country. To attract these visitors, we need to upgrade a spa completely, both in terms of baths and amusements and treatments [...] the baths must not only be places where you can bathe in thermal waters but they must be equipped with all the expensive apparatus of modern balneological methods; and there must not only be decent comfort but a certain level of luxury".

He complained both about the dilapidated state of the existing facilities and their dangerous nature, as some baths – which he privately compared to pigsties – were built directly above the springs, exposing their users to fumaroles. He was also interested in improving the town's appearance, experimenting with colors that would brighten up building facades while resisting sulfurous vapors. Initially, his landscaping project was budgeted at ten thousand pounds, and the estimated duration of the work was seven months. Despite the apparent support of the government, work did not begin until 1905, an article published in the New Zealand Herald that same year reflecting the frustration engendered by this procrastination: "we have a brilliant balneologist, but in practice, we have no baths".

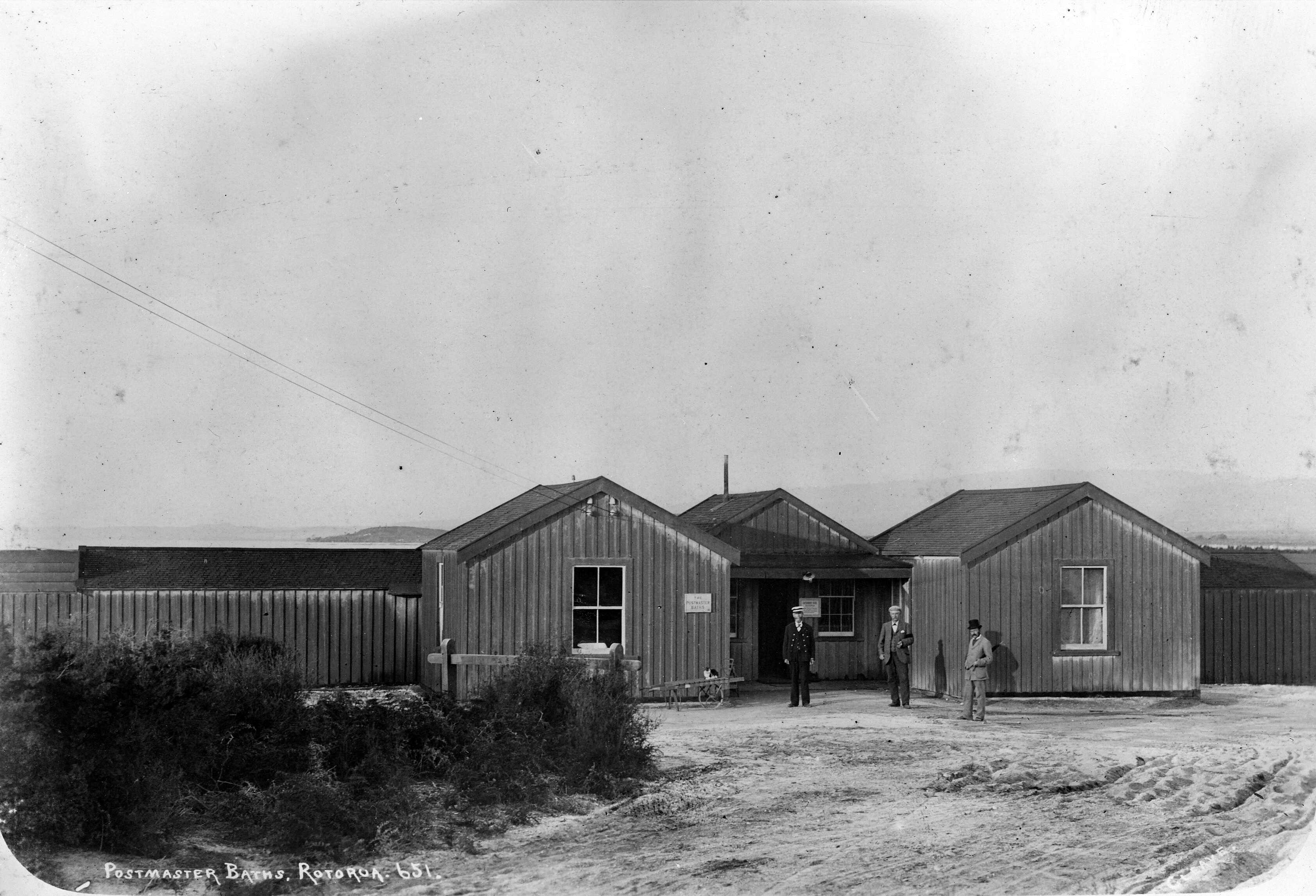
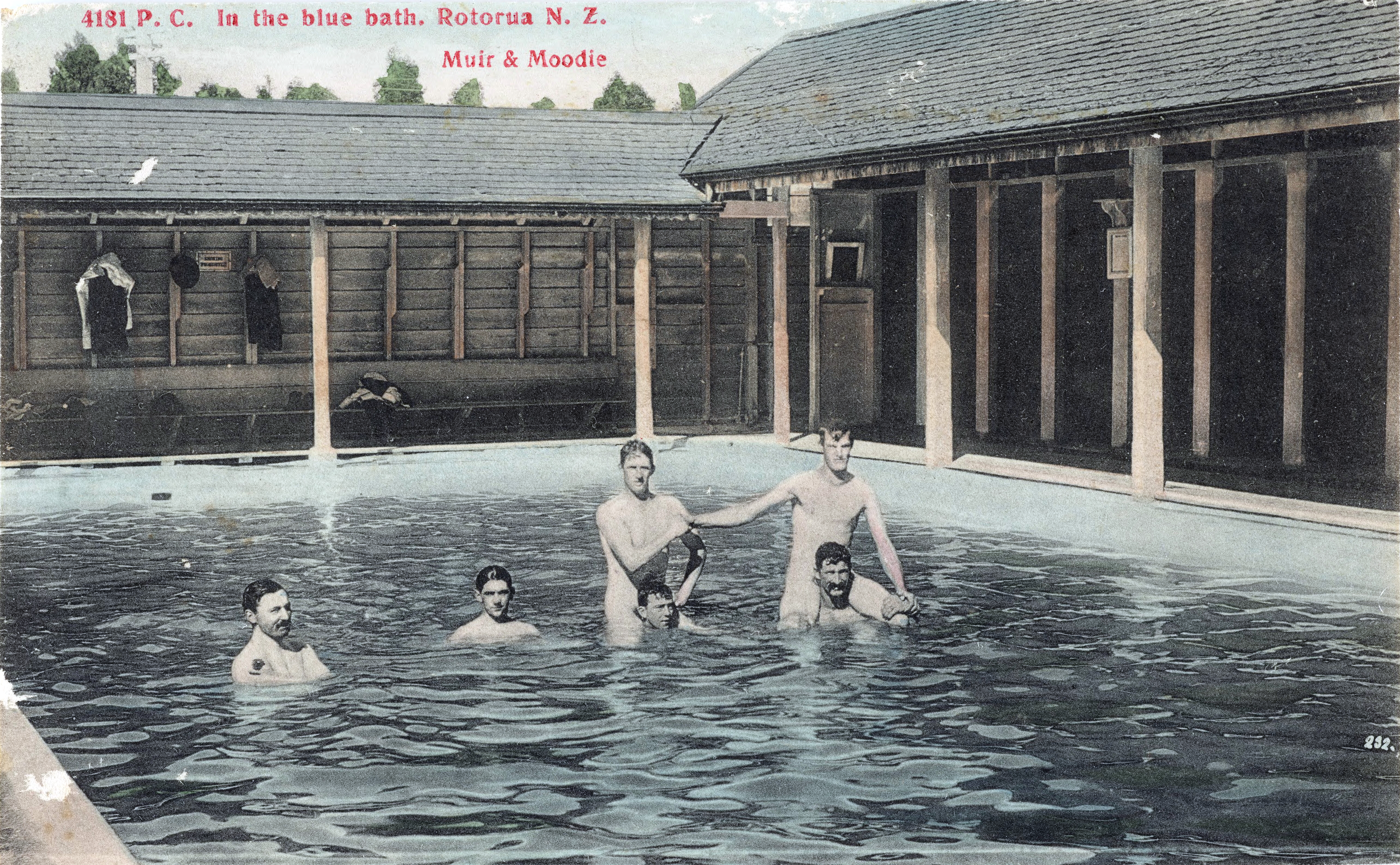
Two of Rotorua's thermal baths predate the Rotorua Baths, which Wohlmann disapproved of as much for their rusticity as for their unhygienic and dangerous nature. On the left, the Postmaster Baths and on the right, the Blue Bath.

By August 1908, the work, which had cost around £40,000, was sufficiently advanced to allow a partial opening. The official inauguration took place in August 1908, in the presence of the Prime Minister, Admiral Sperry, and two hundred officers of the American fleet. The facility, built in a half-timbered style inspired by German spa towns, was intended to feature 14 deep baths, 42 basin baths, 12 mud baths, 4 electric baths, 4 steam baths, and 8 massage showers of various types, while inhalations would be performed in separate rooms where they could be dispensed to 10 patients via wall-mounted cabins "resembling the compartments made available to the public in telegraph offices", all of which could be operated simultaneously via a central electrical panel, but due to budget overruns, only 25 baths were opened. The therapeutic ambitions of the spas were extensive: in addition to arthritis, neuralgia, skin problems, hysteria, neurasthenia, dyspepsia, migraines, hypertension, colitis, constipation, obesity, hemorrhoids, "pelvic viscera" disorders, insomnia, nervous irritability, bronchial and throat infections, liver problems, gout, and kidney ailments were also treated. Many treatments are modeled on those offered in European spas: massage showers according to Dr. Forestier's Aix method, recommended for rheumatism and gout, but also supposed to remedy the atonic condition of the viscera; hot-air Greville baths, intended to relieve effusions; Plombières showers reputed to be effective for "arthritic diseases of the colon"; electric baths used to remedy nervous weakness; or the newly-discovered X-rays used to treat dermatological problems. Wohlmann advocated the idea that certain parts of the skin are linked to internal organs, such as the palms of the hands to the lungs.

In 1913, after returning to Britain for a few months to recover from a fall from a horse, Wohlmann met Dr. Sigmund Saubermann from Berlin, who explained the therapeutic benefits of radioactive mineral water. He convinced the government that the public was "radium-mad" and secured the purchase of an "activator" from a specialist firm in London to enrich mineral water with radium emanation, or radon, to be administered orally in doses of four to six glasses a day, drunk at "frequent intervals" to "maintain the charge in the blood". Increased urine production, gut excretory activity and sexual activity are among the expected beneficial effects. According to Rebecca Priestley and John Horrocks, this therapy was not the result of charlatanism, but of a desire to offer "the best technology available" at a time when the harmfulness of radium was still unknown. Moreover, Wohlmann adopted a holistic approach to spa treatment, considering ambience, change of atmosphere and climate to be an integral part of it; this approach went hand in hand with a more commercial argument, highlighting the age-old expertise of the Maoris from which spa-goers could benefit.

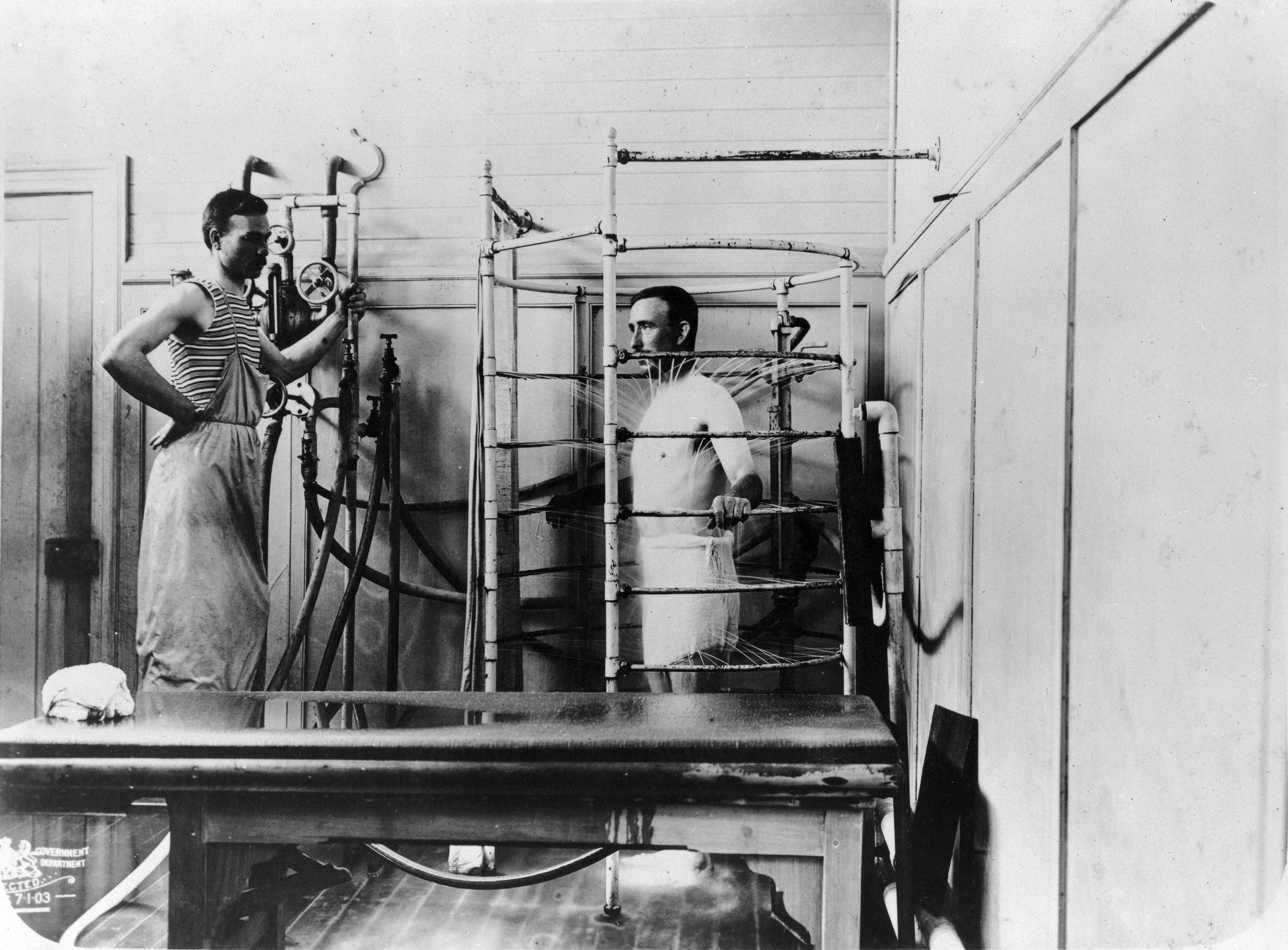
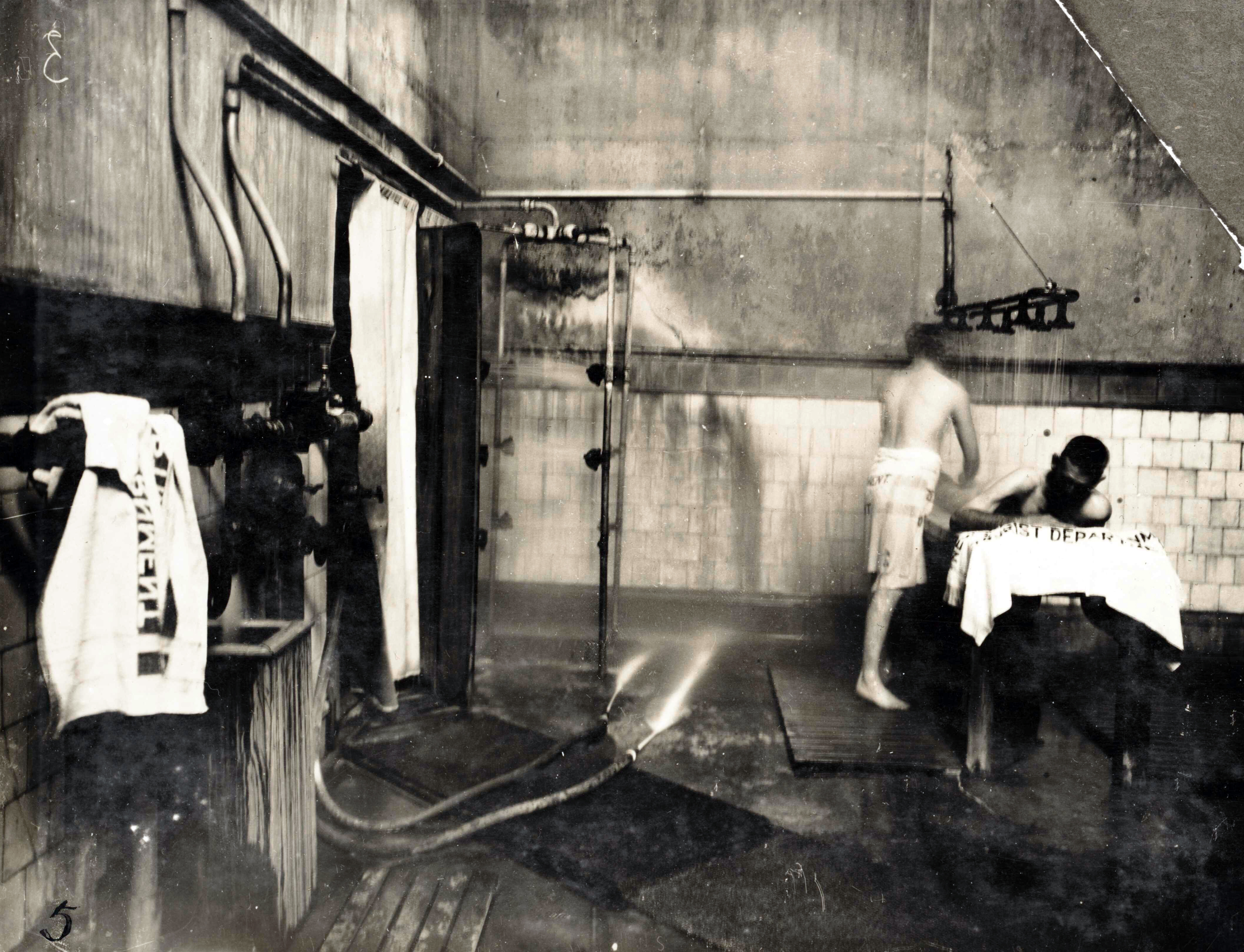
Four of the treatments introduced by Wohlmann in Rotorua. From left to right: needle shower (photo circa 1908), Aix shower-massage using the method developed by French doctor Forestier in Aix-les-Bains (photo circa 1908), four-cell galvanic bath using the method of Austrian doctor Schnee (photo circa 1926) and hot-air electrothermal bath using the method of British doctor Greville (photo circa 1926).

The spa was described as the most beautiful and luxurious building in New Zealand. Journalists pointed out the presence of statues of Charles Francis Summers in the foyer and the luxury of the spa facilities. Wohlmann, supported by the Department of Tourism, argued that these luxuries were necessary to enable Rotorua to compete with the great spas of international renown, but soon after the official opening, the government gradually became more and more reluctant to finance further investment. By 1909, it was clear that the results were not living up to expectations, as the new facilities, despite their luxury, were not sufficient to motivate international spa-goers to make the long journey to New Zealand: the increase in revenue for the year was only £612, and the number of foreign spa-goers remained limited to 95 Australians, 40 Britons and 35 from other countries.

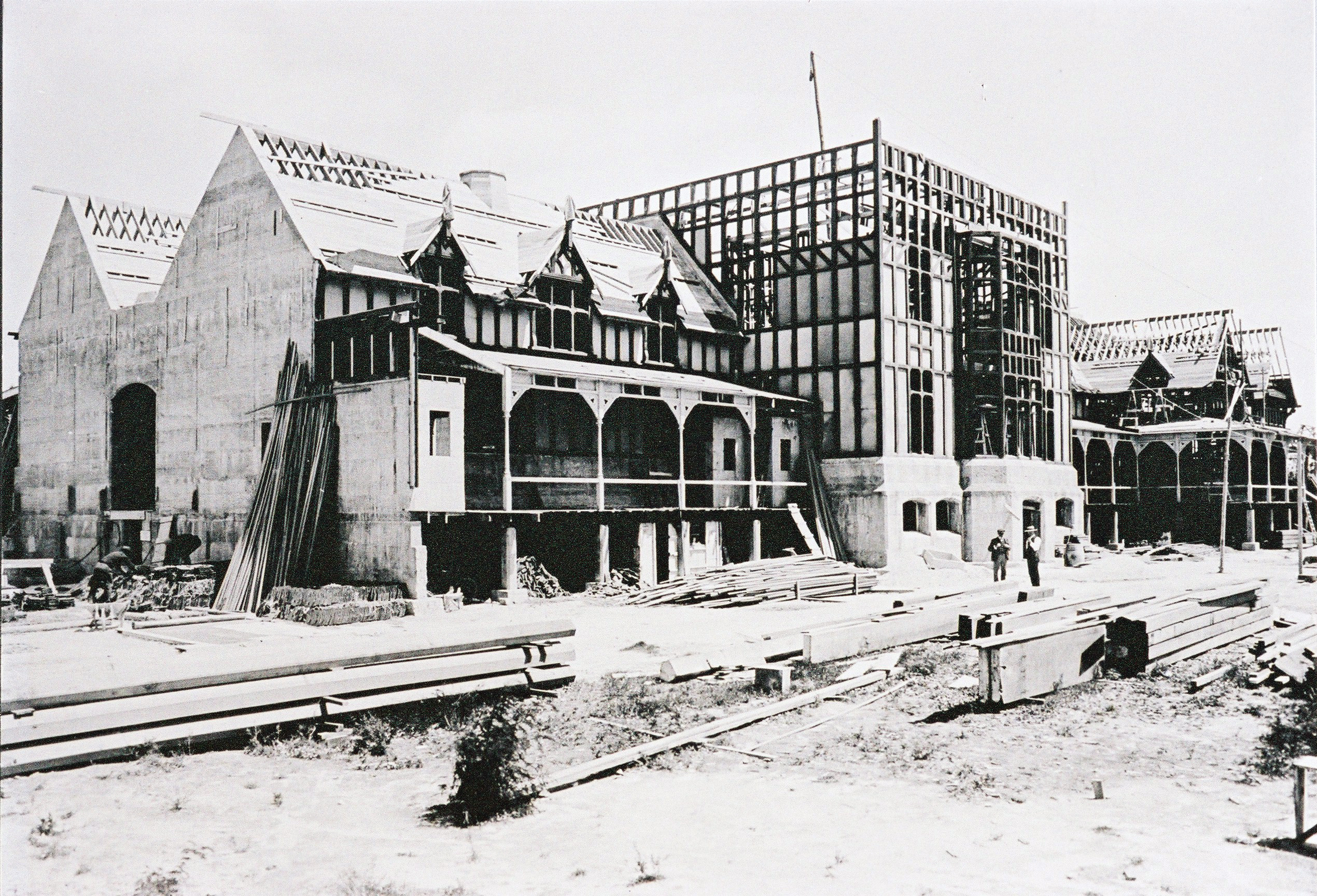
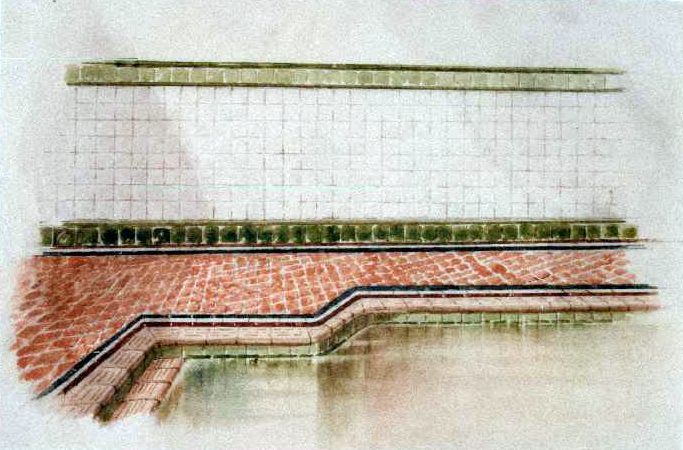
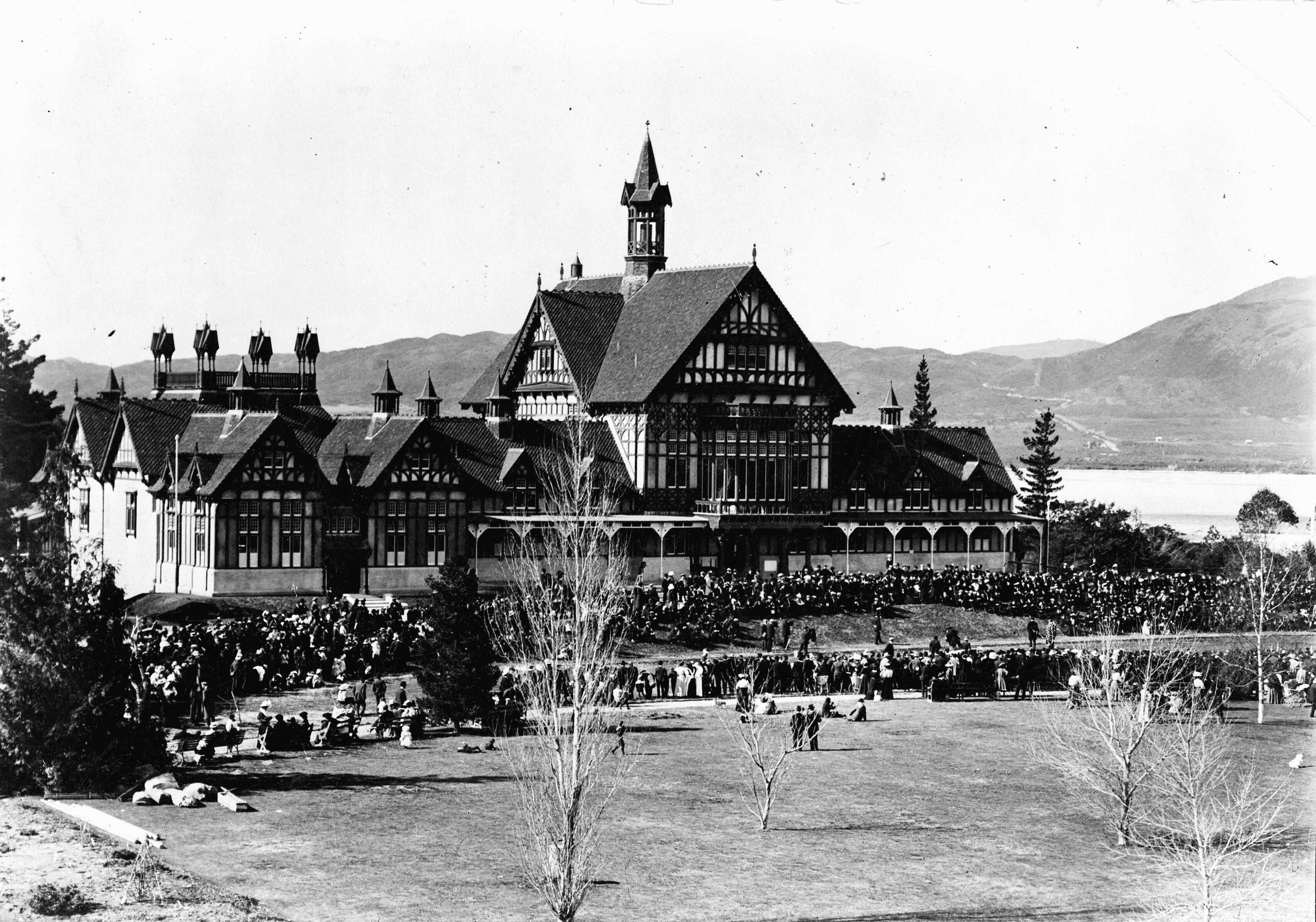
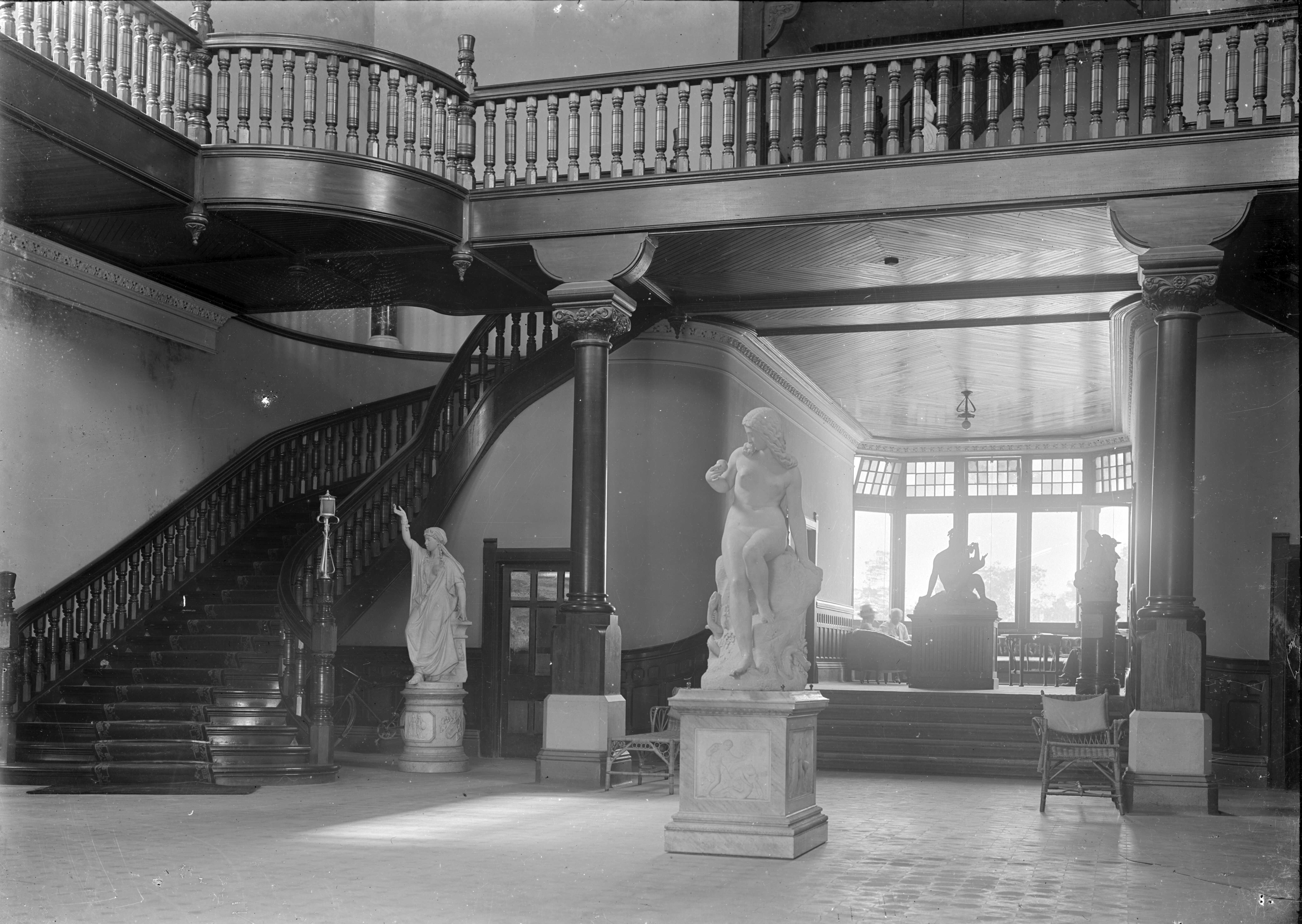
Rotorua Baths. From left to right: photograph of construction, circa 1907; watercolour by Wohlmann illustrating a paving project for the baths; photograph of the inauguration, (1908), attended by the Prime Minister, Joseph Ward, Admiral Sperry accompanied by 200 officers of the American fleet and Maori dignitaries; photograph of the foyer adorned with statues by Charles Francis Summers, which John Horrocks notes implicitly express a kind of promise of the benefits that curists can expect in return for the treatments they agree to undergo.

In the first months of operation, the Rotorua spa began to show signs of deterioration. The high level of sulfur in the water led to rapid corrosion of the piping, while sulfur vapors blackened the paint on the walls, attacked the ventilation and loosened the tile joints. In addition, a dozen minor earthquakes occurred shortly after the opening of the new building. Wohlmann had to write several letters to the Department of Tourism, pointing out that the plasterwork on the walls and ceilings was cracking, with chunks of plaster liable to fall off and injure guests. These problems, attributable as much to the nature of the water as to errors in the building's design, led the government to consider closing the building at the end of the 1920s.

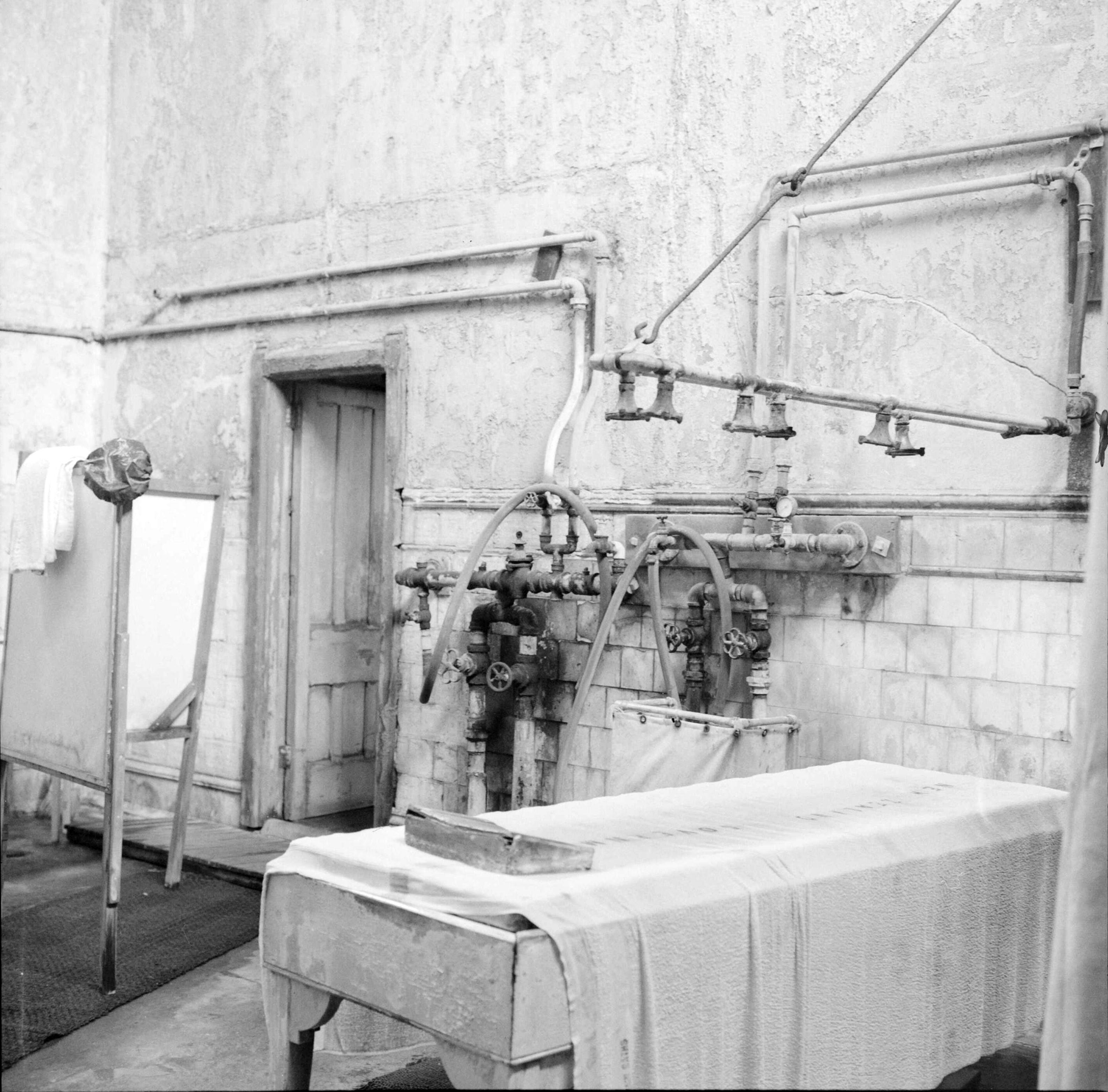
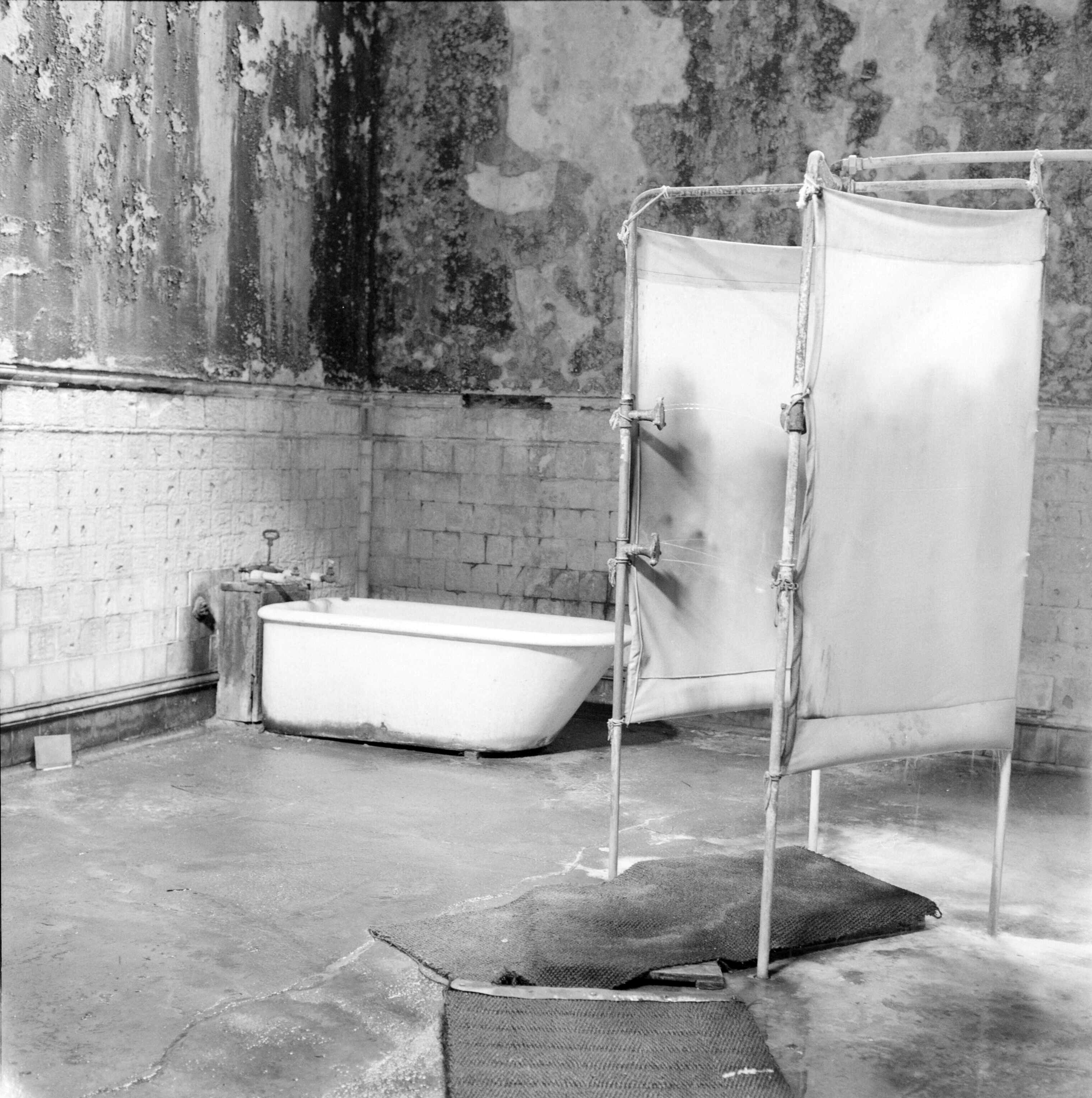
Photographs taken in 1960 showing the dilapidated state of the baths, which closed for good in 1966.

At the same time as managing the spa, Wohlmann continued his work as a physician. In his 1914 book on mineral waters, he summarized the results obtained on 593 patients he had personally treated over the previous three years at the new Rotorua establishment estimating that 536 of them had improved, particularly in cases of rheumatism and arthritis, but also neurasthenia. According to Ralph Johnson, this retrospective synthesis "regrettably" lacks a critical section, particularly on the "supreme importance" attributed to radioactivity in balneology.

== The end of his career ==
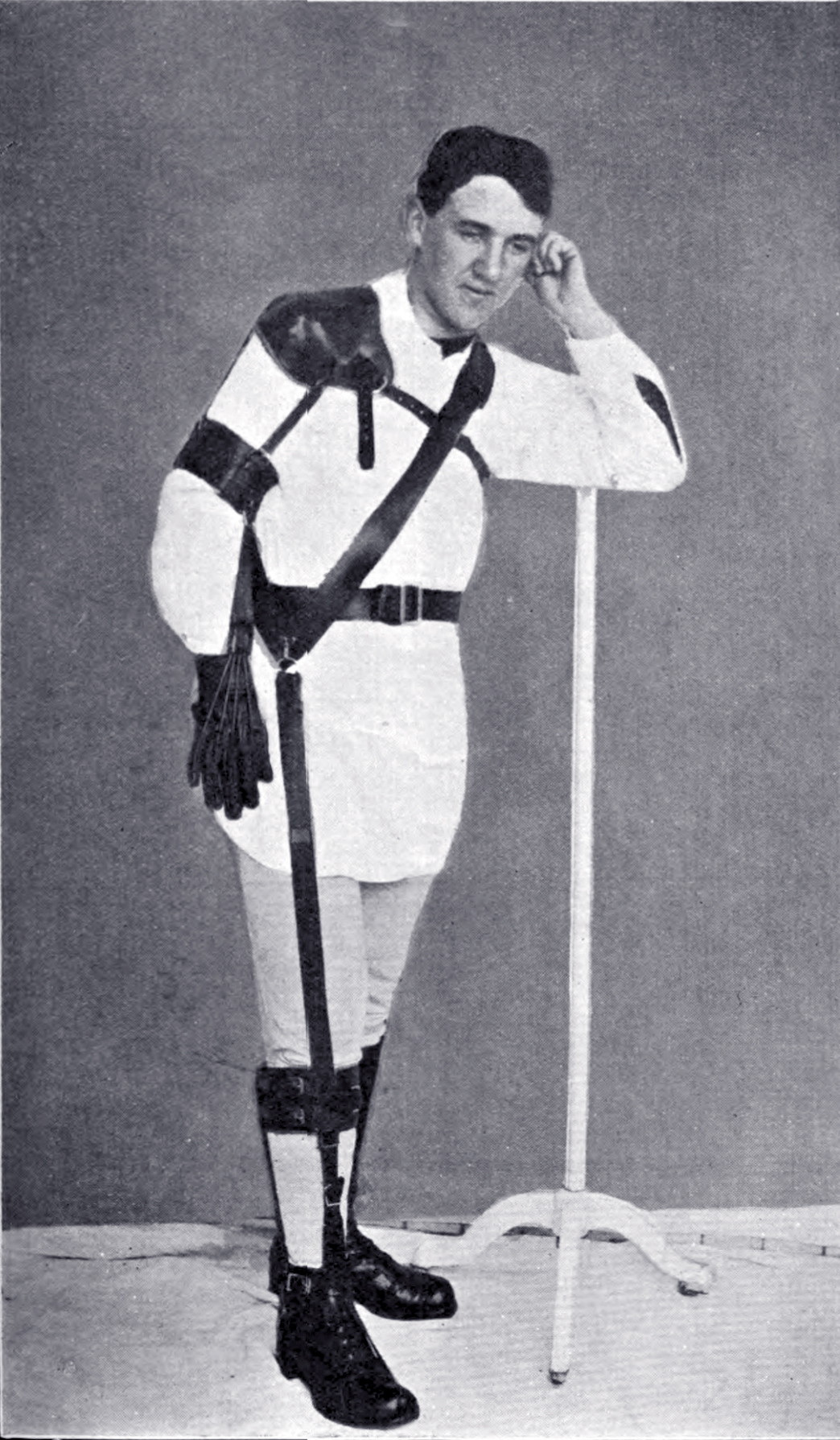
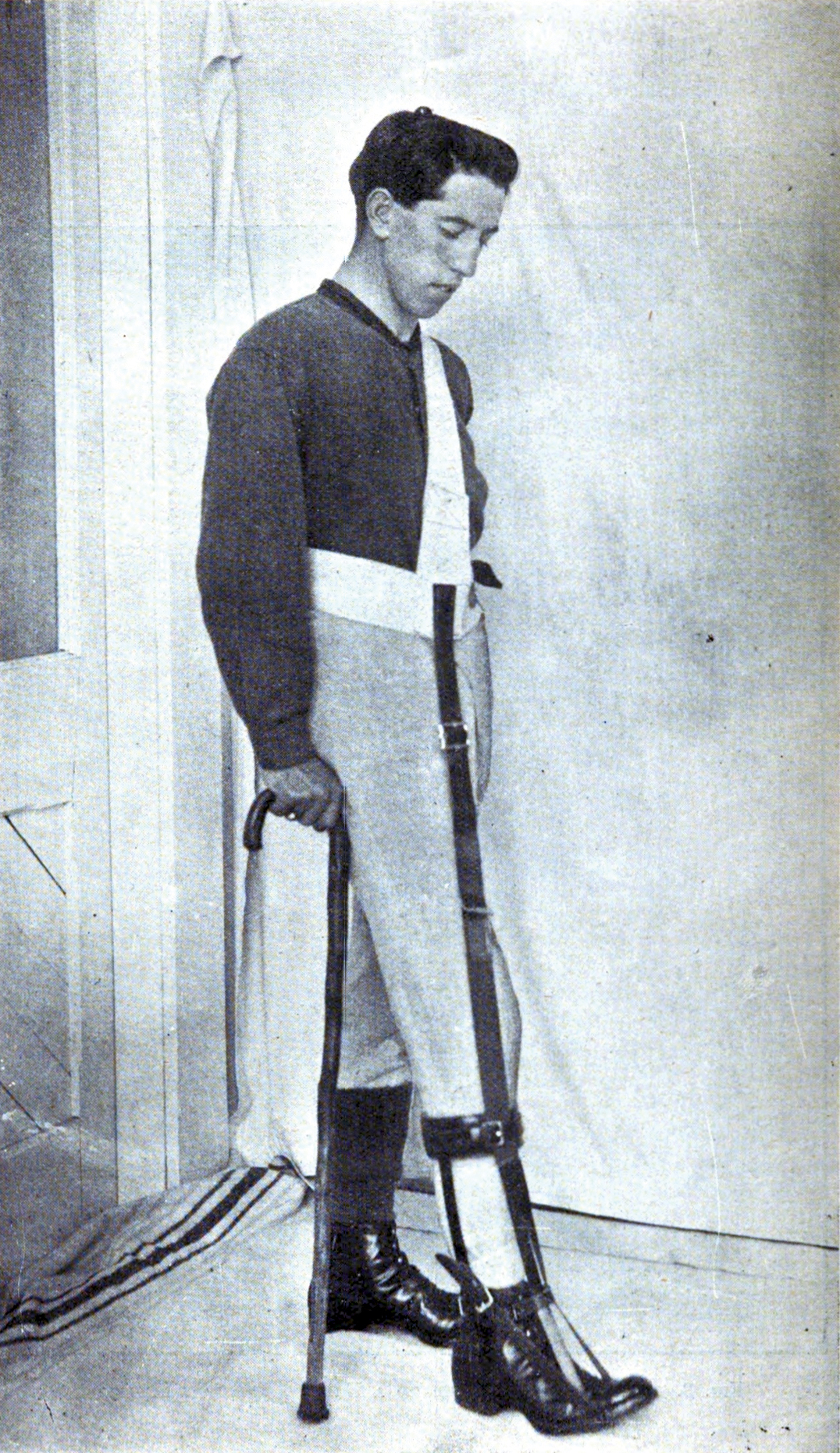
Photographs in 1916 of soldiers fitted with orthopaedic devices after paralysis following wounds.

Shortly after the outbreak of the First World War, Wohlmann was prompted by growing anti-German sentiment to stop using his surname. He adopted his mother's maiden name, Herbert, and announced it in the press.

In 1915, he assumed responsibility for a newly-built hospital in Rotorua for convalescent soldiers, providing treatment which he described in 1916 and 1918 in articles for the New Zealand Medical Journal and later in a book published in 1918, for which he was awarded the Order of the British Empire. According to Ralph Johnson, these works are remarkable both for the precision of their lesion descriptions and for the care with which Wohlmann kept abreast of medical news. However, a review published in the British Medical Journal in 1920 felt that the work reflected the difficulties of New Zealand's isolation during the war, and that the author tended to exaggerate the benefits of his elastic-based devices.

in 1919, Wohlmann was promoted to Major and reinstated in the New Zealand Army. In the same year, he was appointed spa therapist in New Zealand. In this position, he undertook a tour of the country to inspect and classify the hot springs, which he published in 1921 in The Official Guide to the Hot Springs of New Zealand. According to Peter Hodder, this guide took account of worldwide advances in thalassotherapy and highlighted the variety of mineral springs available on the island.

Wohlmann resigned as balneologist in 1919 and returned to London, where he practiced medicine privately in Kensington. In 1921, he published The Hot Springs of New Zealand, a detailed work on spa treatments in New Zealand. In the preface, Wohlmann argues that, while New Zealand spas cannot compete socially with those in Europe, the change of atmosphere is one of the important aspects of a cure, and that in this respect New Zealand, with "its strange and wonderful scenery, its splendid lakes, [...] its geysers, its bubbling springs, [...] its picturesque Maori villages, [...] its housewives washing their clothes in a hot spring or nonchalantly cooking in a steam pit, offers more of a change of scenery than a visit to a continental spa". According to John Horrocks, this remark testifies to an "openness to the importance of suggestion", in the context of a balneologist's interest in the care of "indefinite and borderline cases" and, more generally, in the idea – developed a few years earlier by George Miller Beard with his thematization of the concept of neurasthenia – that the cause of nervous disease was modern civilization, Wohlmann thus expressed a sincere alignment with the theme developed by the New Zealand government's tourism propaganda.

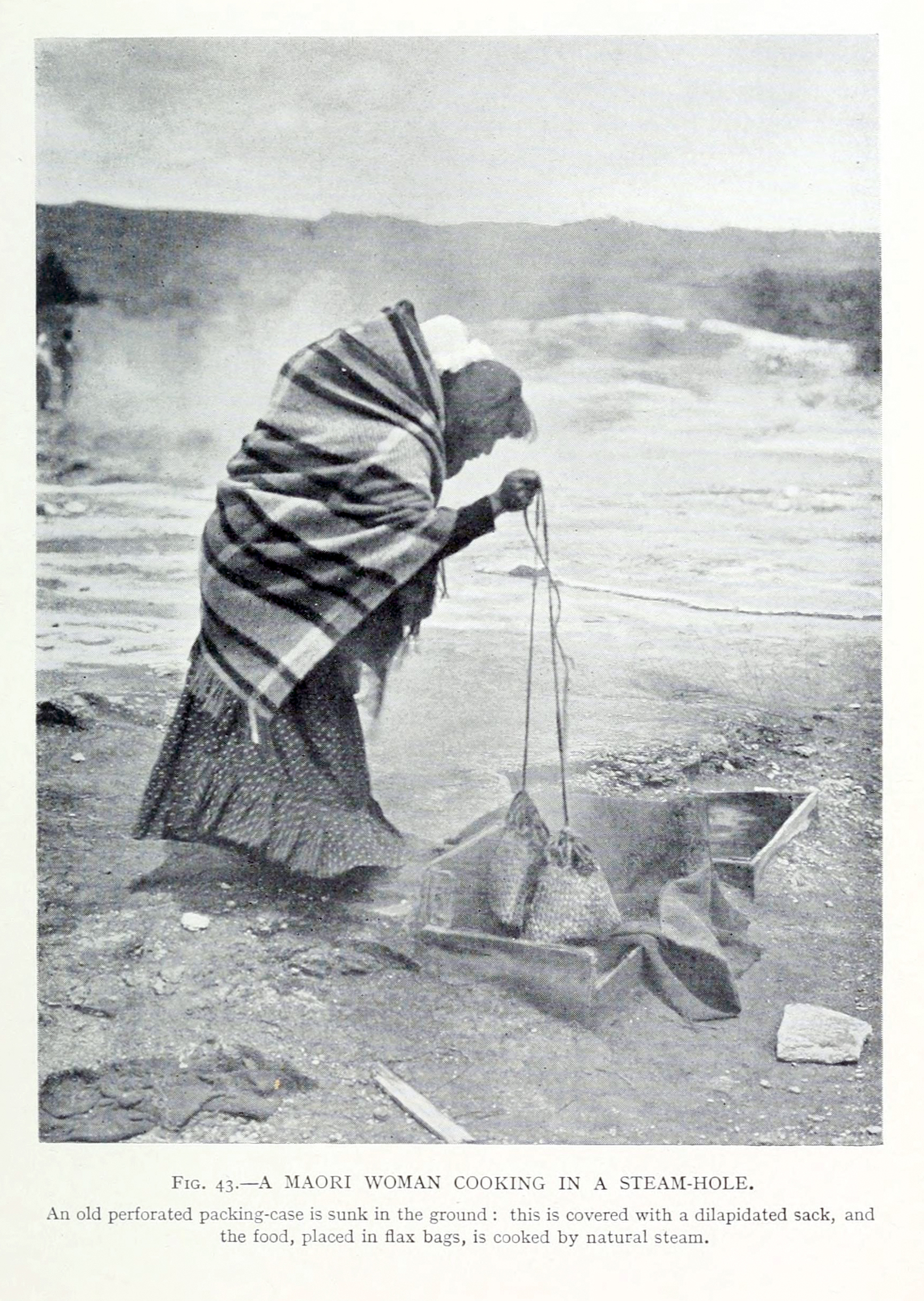
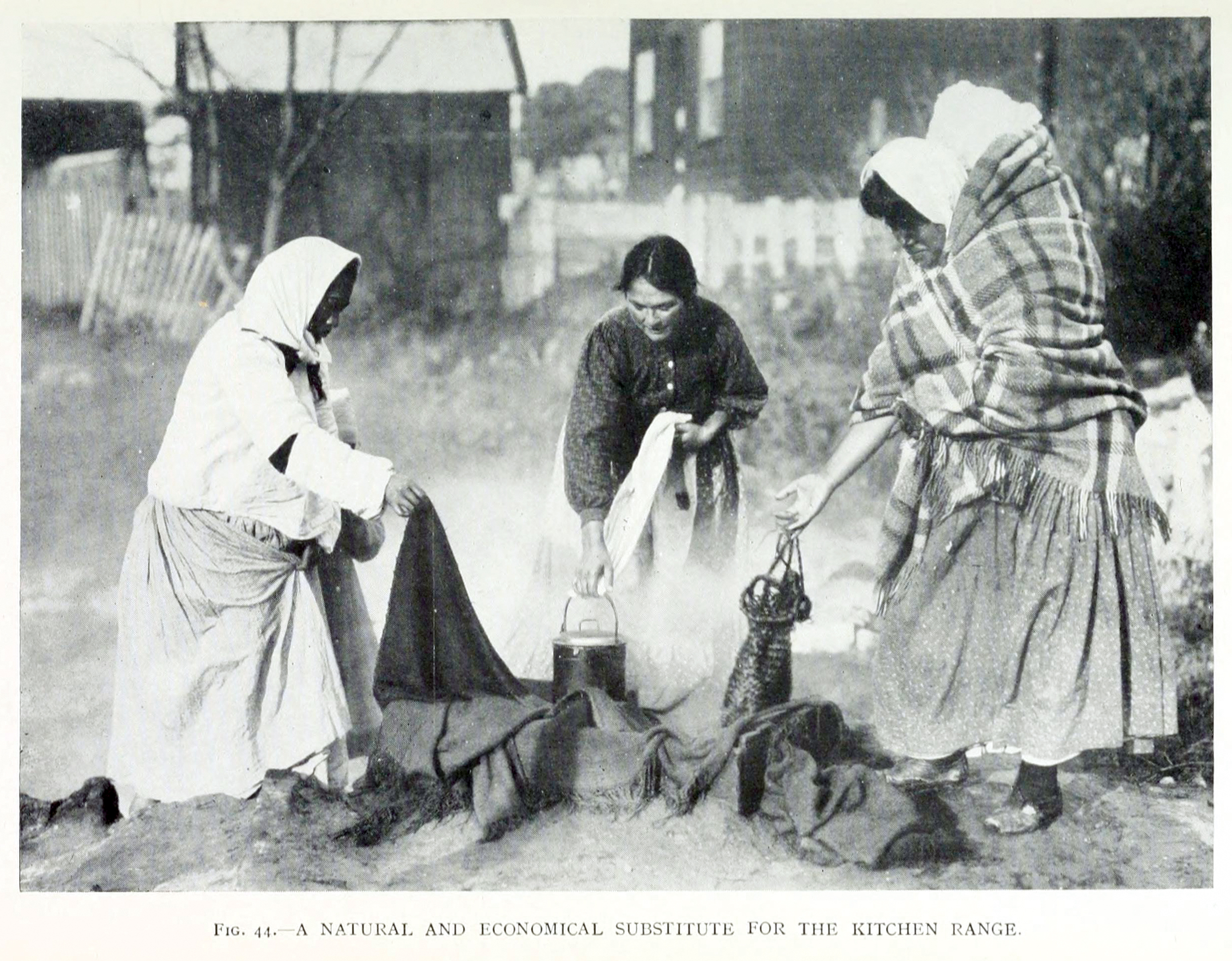
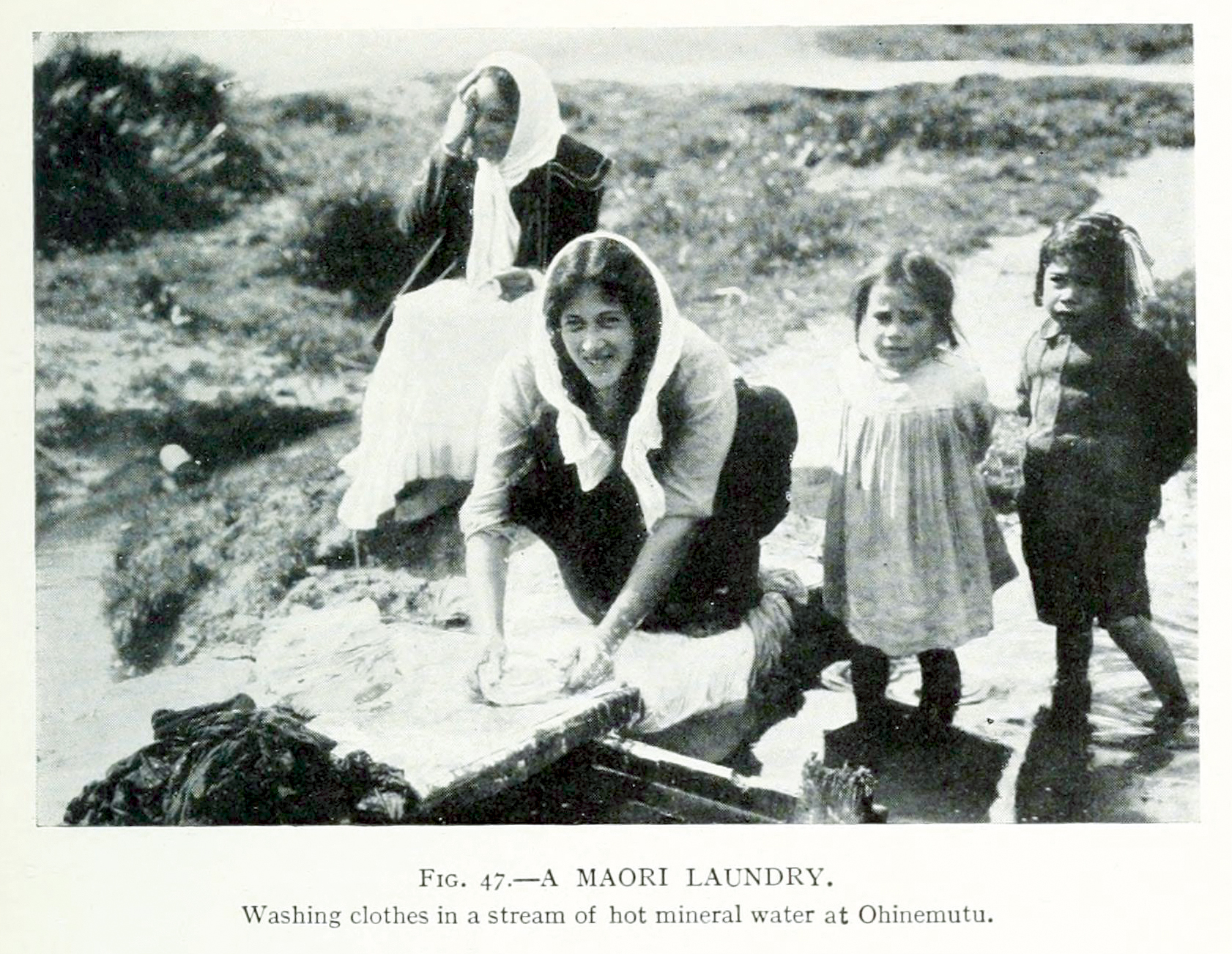
Illustrations from The Hot Springs of New Zealand, vernacular use of thermal resources for cooking and laundry.

In one of his latest publications, Wohlmann, without going back over the benefits of a change of scenery during a spa treatment, nor over the therapeutic virtues of mineral waters, recommended not underestimating the advantages of simple hydrotherapy with ordinary hot water available in a city like London, combined with "massage, manipulation and movement, using electricity, light and dry heat". Peter Hodder noted that Wohlmann had already been convinced in 1914 that the effectiveness of some of his treatments was due more to the temperature of the water than to its composition.

He died on March 3, 1944 in Richmond. The position of government balneologist was held by Dr. Duncan from 1919 to 1942, then by Dr. Blair from 1942 to 1957, and was not renewed after 1957. This evolution is consistent with the changing perception of geothermal water issues in New Zealand since the mid-twentieth century, first seen as a spectacle for tourists, then as a remedy in the form of baths or beverages, then as a leisure activity, before being mainly considered today from the angle of energy supply.

== Bibliography ==
- Hodder, Peter (2015). Trends in Technological Use and Social Relevance of New Zealand's Geothermal Waters (PDF). Vol. 79. Chemistry in New Zealand.
- Horrocks, John (2012). Cureland : The Spa as Metaphor. Vol. 1. The International Journal of Health, Wellness, and Society.
- Johnson, Ralph (1990). "Arthur Stanley Wohlmann, the First Government Balneologist in New Zealand". The Medical History of Waters and Spas (in French). Wellcome Institute for the History of Medicine.
- McClure, Margaret (2004). The Wonder Country : Making New Zealand Tourism. Auckland University Press.
- Nicholls, David; Harwood, Grayson (2017). Physical Therapies in 19th Century Aotearoa/New Zealand : Part 3 — Rotorua Spa and Discussion. Vol. 45. New Zealand Journal of Physiotherapy.
- Priestley, Rebecca (2017). Dr Wohlmann's Radon Cure : The Story of the Rotorua Bathhouse Radium Activator (PDF). Vol. 81. Chemistry in New Zealand.
