= Margaret Thomas =

Australian writer, painter and sculptor (1842–1929)

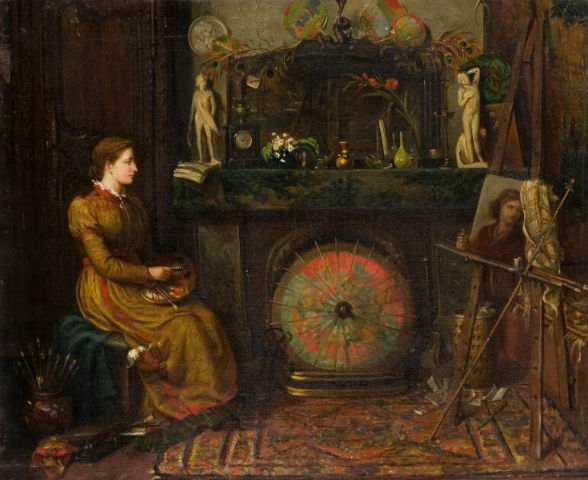
- Margaret Thomas, self-portrait, c.1881
- Born: Margaret Cook; 23 December 1842; Croydon, Surrey, England, UK
- Died: 24 December 1929 (aged 87); Norton, Hertfordshire, England, UK
- Known for: Painting, sculpture, poetry, writing

Margaret Thomas (born Margaret Cook; 23 December 1842 – 24 December 1929) was an English-born Australian travel writer, poet and artist. Thomas was born at Croydon, Surrey, daughter of Thomas Cook, shipowner. Her date of birth is sometimes cited as 1843 and she was herself inconsistent about both her age and date of birth. It has also been discovered that she was originally named Margaret Cook and only later changed her surname to her father's first name.

== Career ==
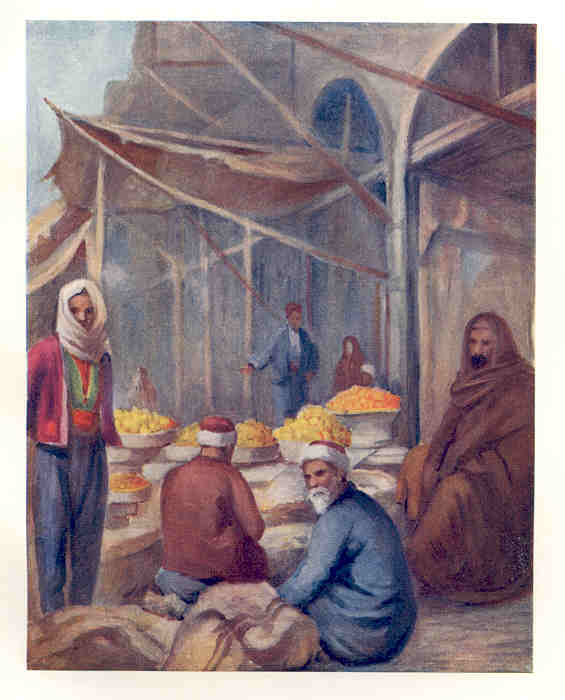
The Fruit Bazaar, Damascus, painting by Margaret Thomas and reproduced in John E. Kelman, From Damascus to Palmyra (1908)

Margaret Cook came to Australia with her family in 1852 and studied with the sculptor Charles Summers in Melbourne. Thomas lived in Richmond, Victoria and exhibited her work regularly.

Around 1867, she moved to Europe to continue studying sculpture, where she exhibited more of her work.

Between 1868 and 1880, Thomas exhibited her paintings (mostly portraits) at the Royal Academy. In 1880 Thomas wrote a biography of her teacher Charles Summers titled A Hero of the Workshop and completed a bust of him. She created other busts and began writing poetry. Thomas is also believed to have painted a number of middle eastern watercolours with a curious monogram consisting of an inverted L or Greek gamma (Γ) over a gothic M.

In 1888, Thomas left England for Brittany and subsequently Rome, accompanied by her long-term companion Henrietta Pilkington (1848-1927). During the 1890s, they travelled throughout the Middle East and her book A Scamper through Spain and Tangier (1892) was dedicated to My dear friend, the companion of these wanderings. She wrote further books, including Two Years in Palestine and Syria (1899), Denmark Past and Present (1902), How to Judge Pictures (1906), A Painter's Pastime (1908), How to Understand Sculpture (1911). In 1927, after Pilkington's death, she published another volume of poetry titled Friendship, Poems in Memoriam. She also illustrated the 1908 book From Damascus to Palmyra by John Kelman. Thomas did not marry, although she spent much of her adult life with Henrietta Pilkington. The pair moved to Norton, Hertfordshire in 1911, living in a cottage known as Countryside in Croft Lane, where Thomas died on 24 December 1929, the day after her 87th birthday. She was buried with Pilkington, who had died two years before, in Norton churchyard. Several of her sculptures and 27 of her paintings are in the collections of North Hertfordshire Museum, which also contains works by Pilkington.

== Australia ==
Margaret Thomas's painting of Charles Summers, c. 1879 was the first portrait of an Australian artist to enter the National Gallery of Victoria collection, notably it was also the first oil painting by an Australian female artist acquired by the National Gallery of Victoria in 1881. Thomas' portraits of Charles Summers and Sir Redmond Barry, are held by the State Library of Victoria, Melbourne.

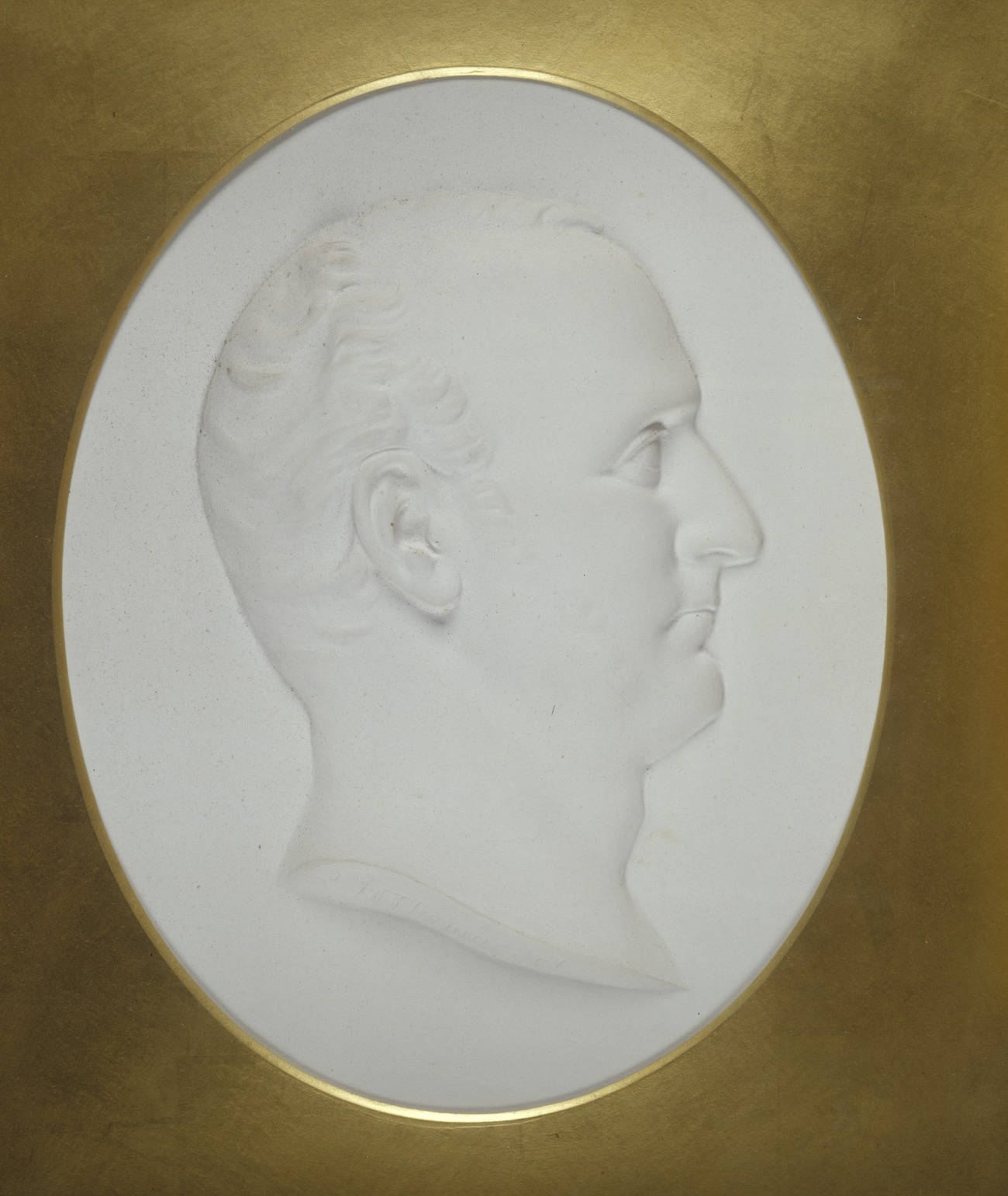
Sir Redmond Barry

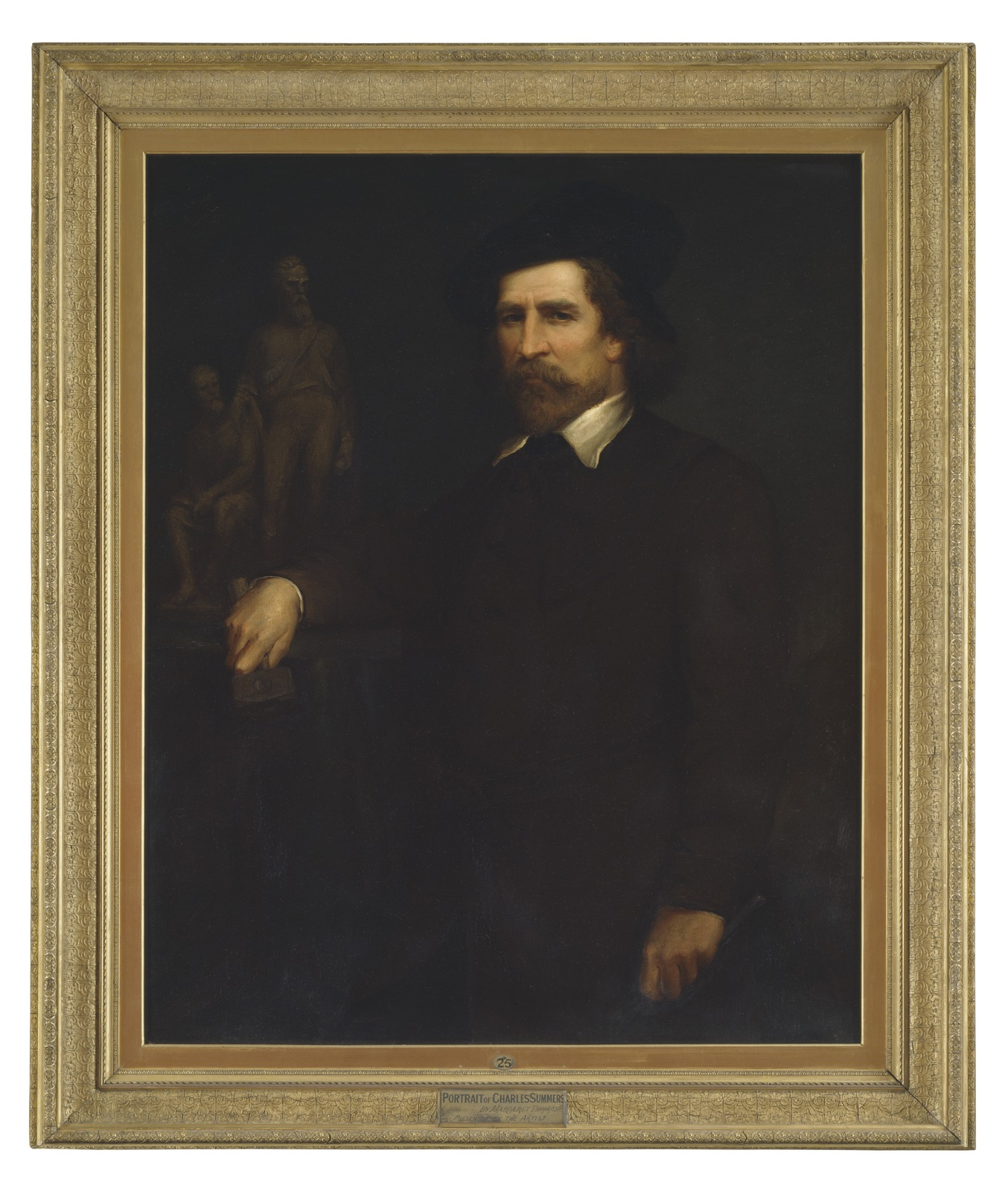
Charles Summers
Images courtesy of Margaret Thomas Collection, State Library Victoria

== Sources ==
- Serle, Percival (1949). "Thomas, Margaret". Dictionary of Australian Biography. Sydney: Angus & Robertson.
- "Mysterious Margaret" by John Ramm in Antique Dealer & Collectors Guide, vol 59, Nos 2&3 (Sept/Oct 2005)
