= Charles Summers =

English sculptor (1825–1878)

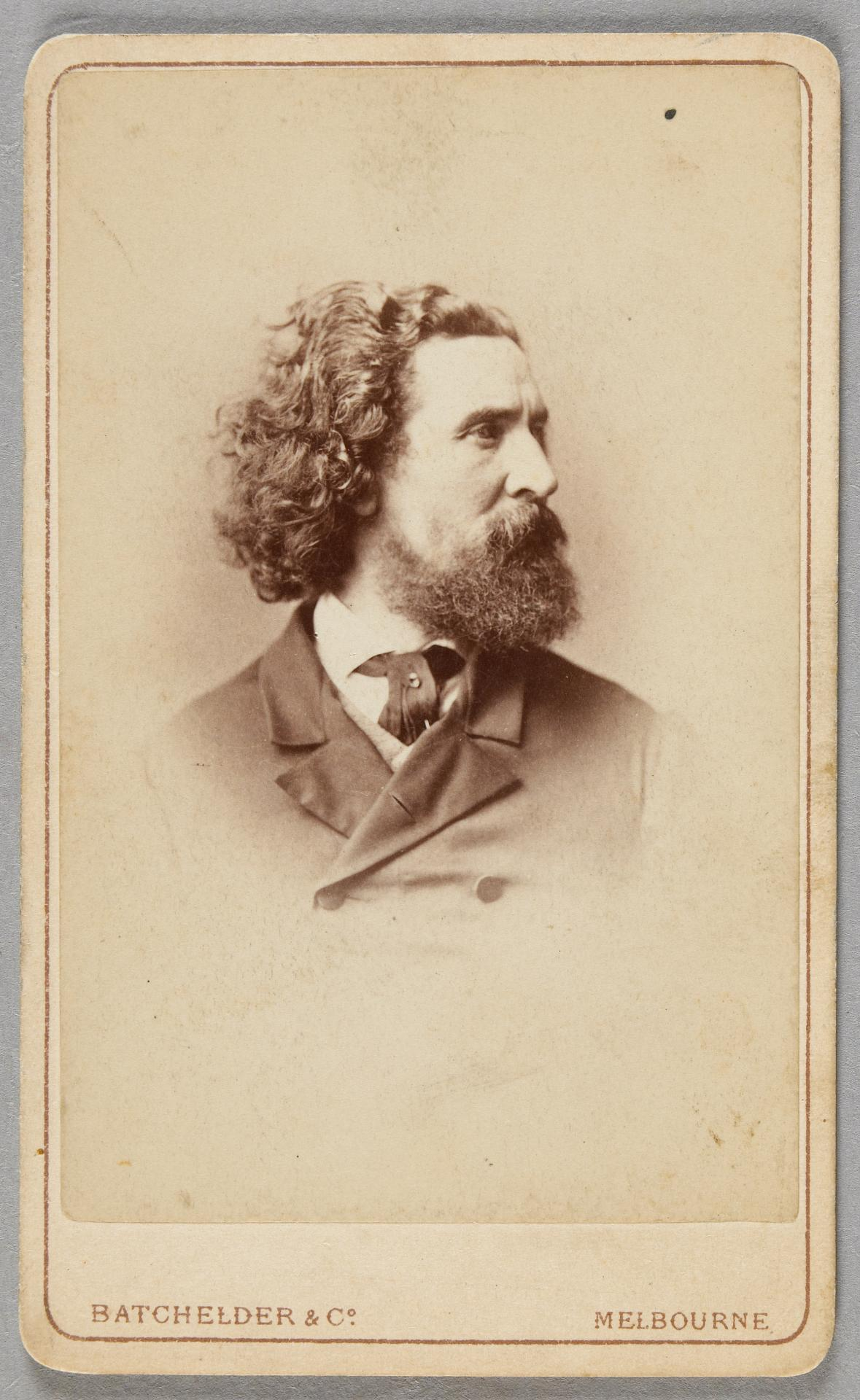
Batchelder & Co., photographers. [Charles] Summers [ca. 1863-ca. 1872], taken in Melbourne. Albumen silver carte-de-visite photograph. H9517. La Trobe Picture Collection, State Library Victoria, Australia

Charles Summers (27 July 1825 – 24 October 1878) was an English sculptor active in London, Melbourne and Rome. He was an important figure in the Australian art world of the 1850s and 60s, and is particularly remembered as the creator of the memorial to the explorers Burke and Wills in Melbourne.

== Early life ==
Summers was born at Charlton Mackrell, near Ilchester, in Somerset, son of George Summers, builder and mason, and elder brother of Joseph Summers. George Summers had roaming ways which meant that his family was frequently in financial difficulties. His mother, however, was a woman of good character. Summers went to work from eight years of age and, while employed in masons' yards, began to show ability in carving fancy stone work. That led to his being employed as an assistant in setting up a monumental figure at Weston-super-Mare, which had been modelled by Henry Weekes, R.A. He saved money from his wages and, at the age of 19, went to London and obtained work at Weekes's studio. Summers subsequently worked under Musgrave Watson, another sculptor of the period, and studied at the Royal Academy schools. In 1851, he won the silver medal for the best model from life and the gold medal for the set subject, Mercy interceding for the Vanquished.

== Australia ==
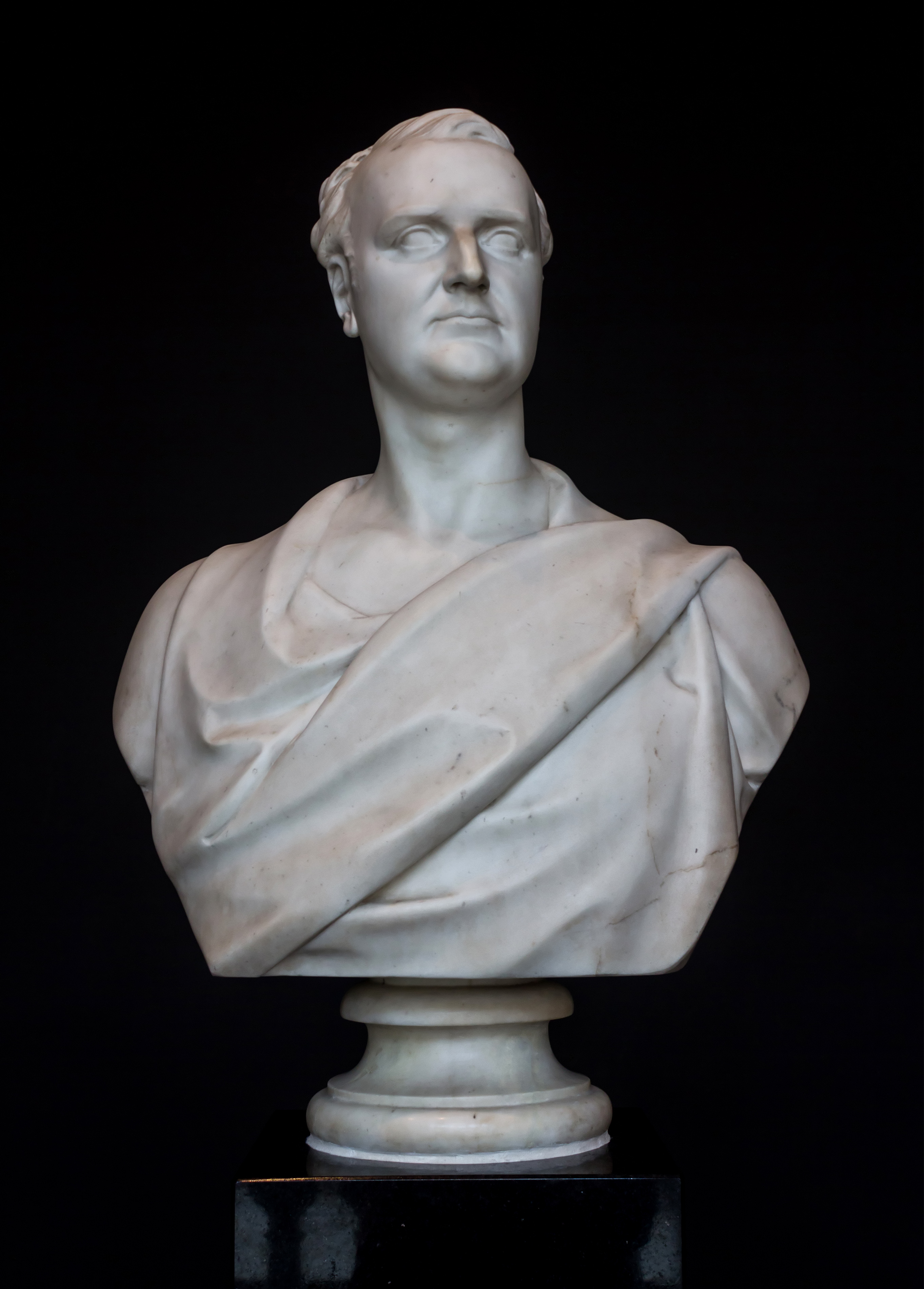
Bust of Sir Redmond Barry (Summers, 1860)

Summers, a hard worker, fell into ill health and, in 1852 sailed for Australia, joining one of his brothers who had previously settled there. He tried his fortunes at gold-digging but seeing an advertisement for modellers for the newly built Parliament House in Melbourne, obtained a position and modelled the figures on the ceiling of the council chamber. The exhibiting of some busts at the 1854 intercolonial exhibition led to his getting commissions, and he opened a studio in Collins Street. Summers was a founder of the Victorian Society of Fine Arts in October 1856. Summers tutored William Stanford in sculpture design.

In 1864, it was decided to erect a memorial to the explorers Burke and Wills. Summers obtained the commission, and not only modelled the figures but built a furnace and cast them in bronze himself. The colossal figure of Burke was cast in one operation, an amazing feat when it is considered that there were no skilled workmen for that type of work in Australia. On the completion of the group, he sailed for England on the True Briton in May 1867 and, after obtaining various commissions, went to Rome and opened a studio. There he did a large amount of work and was able to employ many assistants. In 1876, Sir William J. Clarke employed him to do four large statues in marble of Queen Victoria, Prince Albert, and the Prince and Princess of Wales for presentation to the Melbourne Art Gallery. They were completed in 1878. Soon afterwards, Summers was taken seriously ill while on his way to England, and died after an operation for acute goitre at Paris on 30 November 1878.

== Legacy ==
Summers was a regular exhibitor at Royal Academy exhibitions, and more than 40 of his works were shown between 1849 and 1876. Several examples of his work, together with his portrait of Margaret Thomas, are in the historical collection at the National Gallery of Victoria, Melbourne. Summers is also represented in the Adelaide gallery and at the Mitchell Library, Sydney. Summers had married Augustine Amiot in 1851. His only son, Charles Francis Summers, who survived him, was also a sculptor.

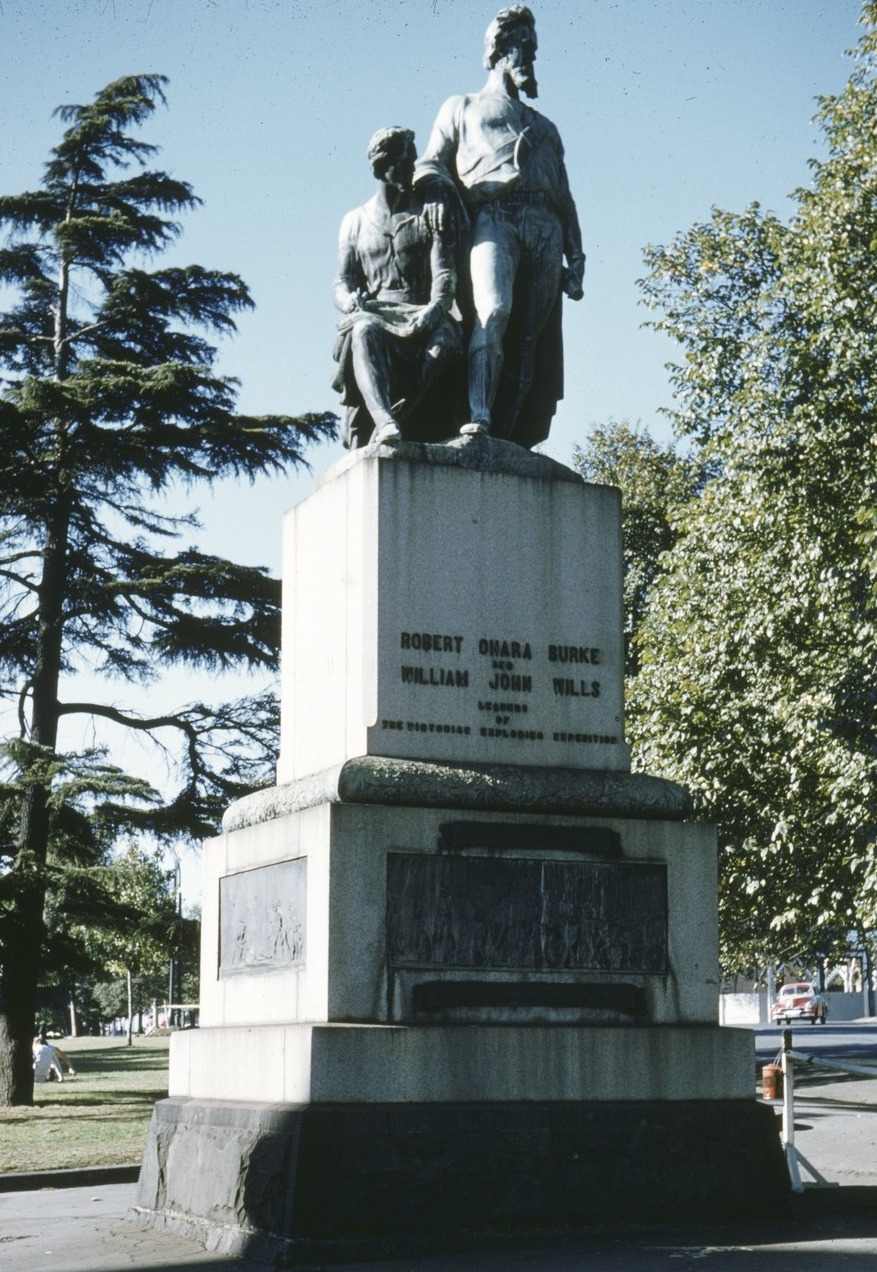
Statue of Burke & Wills by Charles Summers at the Spring Street location, 1954.
