= Joseph Summers (musician) =

Joseph Summers Mus.Doc (1839 – 10 October 1917) was an English-born Australian musician and composer.

Summers was youngest son of George Summers, of Charlton Mackrell, Somersetshire, and brother of the sculptor Charles Summers. In early life Summers was a chorister in Wells Cathedral. After studying under such eminent musicians as Dr. Henry Gauntlett and Sir William Sterndale Bennett, Summers graduated Mus. Bac. at the University of Oxford in 1863, and after holding the post of organist at Weston-super-Mare and at Notting Hill, London, he emigrated to Melbourne in 1865 and for fourteen years was choirmaster and organist at St. Peter's, Eastern Hill, Melbourne, one of the oldest and leading Anglican churches in Victoria. In 1876 he was appointed Government Inspector of Music for State Schools; acts as Musical Examiner for the Tasmanian Council of Education; also the Education Department of Victoria, and assisted Professor Ives (late of Glasgow) as examiner at the University of Adelaide. In 1890 the degree of Mus. Doc. was conferred on Summers by the Archbishop of Canterbury, as a social mark of recognition of his anthems and other high-class sacred music.

Summers moved to Perth, Western Australia in 1897 where he was commissioned two years later by Fr. James Duff to compose the music for a dramatic production of Milton's poetry. Summers went to court to try and obtain payment for the twenty seven pieces he wrote but was unsuccessful, although he did win the public performing rights. Summers died of heart failure in Perth on 10 October 1917, survived by a son and a daughter; his wife had died in April 1901.
