= Charles Francis Summers =

Australian sculptor

- Born: 1858; Richmond, Victoria, Australia
- Died: 1945 (aged 86–87); Fitzroy North, Victoria, Australia
- Known for: Sculpture

Charles Francis Summers (1858-1945) was an Australian sculptor. The son of the British-born sculptor Charles Summers, he worked mainly in Rome, travelling back and forth to Australia to sell his pieces.

== Career ==
Summers lived in Rome for thirty years, studying sculpture under his father, and drawing with Italian painter Ludovico Seitz.

In Melbourne, he had a studio in the Grosvenor Chambers, and later, in Jolimont. He was amongst the first to quarry marble in Victoria, in the area of Benambra.

== Works ==
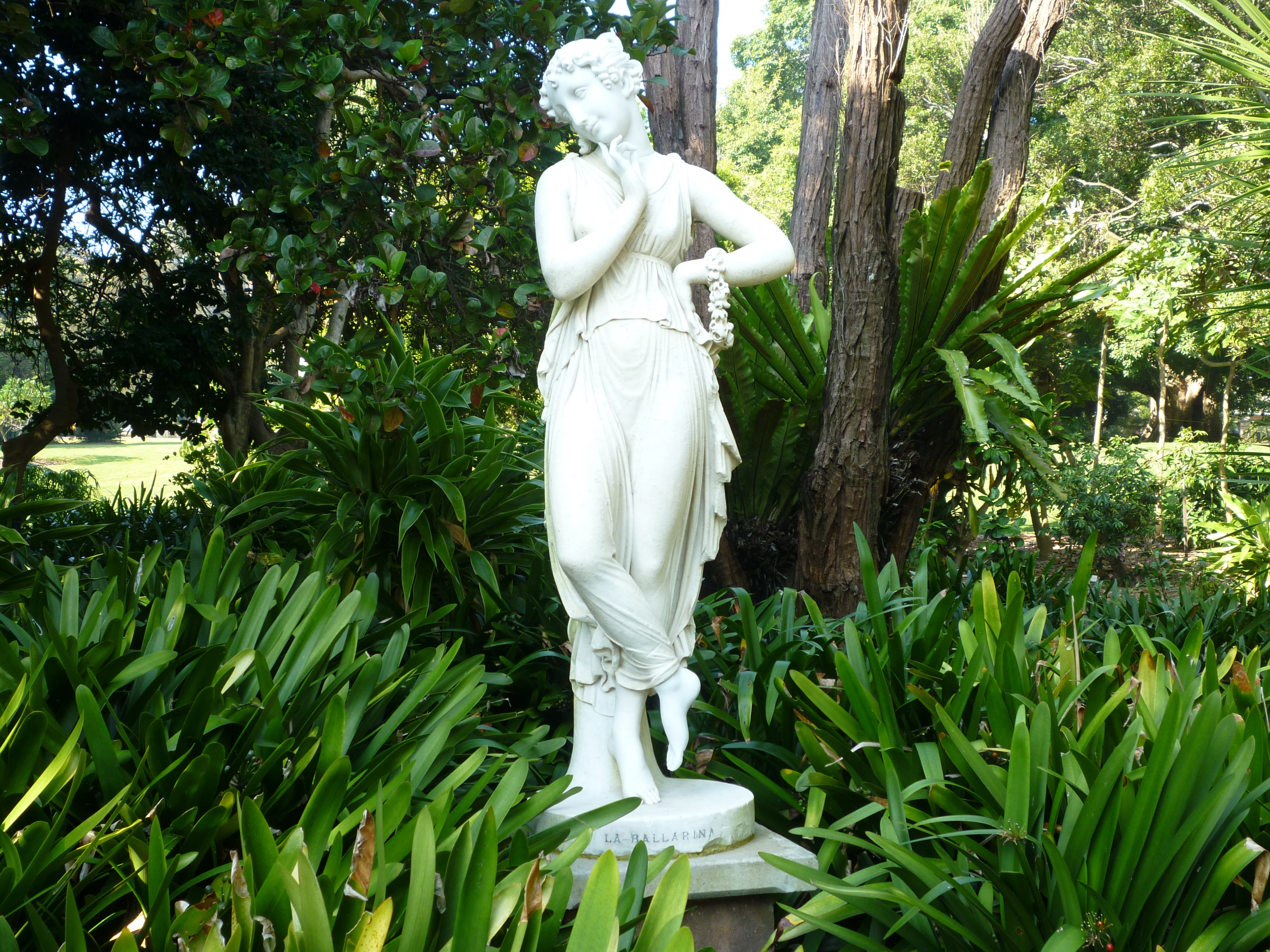
La Ballarina

A selection of Summers's works is preserved in the Art Museum of Rotorua, New Zealand.

A number of Summers' sculptures including La Ballerina (c.1880s), The Four Seasons (Spring, Summer, Autumn, and Winter) (c. 1870s), and The Boxers are situated in the Royal Botanic Garden, Sydney. Five of his sculptures (Flight From Pompeii, Modesty, Rebekah, Ruth, and Susannah) along with the pavilion in which they are housed are listed on the Victorian Heritage Register and are located in the Ballarat Botanical Gardens. "The Shunammite Woman" and "An Episode of Pompeii"is held by the Bendigo Art Gallery.
