= Burke & Wills =

- Film poster
- Directed by: Graeme Clifford
- Written by: Michael Thomas
- Based on: Burke and Wills expedition
- Produced by: Graeme Clifford; John Sexton
- Starring: Jack Thompson; Nigel Havers
- Cinematography: Russell Boyd
- Edited by: Tim Wellburn
- Music by: Peter Sculthorpe
- Production company: Hoyts Edgley
- Distributed by: Hoyts Distribution
- Release dates: 31 October 1985 (Australia); May 1986 (Cannes Film Festival)
- Running time: 140 minutes
- Country: Australia
- Language: English
- Budget: A$8,900,000 (estimated)
- Box office: A$1,567,000 (Australia)

Burke & Wills is a 1985 Australian adventure film directed by Graeme Clifford, starring Jack Thompson and Nigel Havers. The film is based on the ill-fated Burke and Wills expedition across Australia.

The film follows Robert O'Hara Burke and William John Wills in their crossing of Australia's interior in 1860–1. The film's account of the story changes the expedition's ending by having the explorers actually reach the northern coast. This upbeat idea was vehemently criticised by Australian reviewers. The film was released a week after the similarly themed comedy Wills & Burke.

== Plot synopsis ==
Irish explorer Robert O'Hara Burke (Thompson) and British scientist William John Wills (Havers), have set out to make the first maps of the interior region of the Australian continent in 1860. During their journey, they and their compatriots run low on food and suffer from heat exhaustion. They are offered food and assistance by Aboriginal people with experience of living in the region, but repeatedly refuse. Burke's stubbornness and poor leadership style also leads to multiple arguments. Ultimately, starvation and thirst kills off most of the expedition. Only John King survives after accepting Aboriginal assistance. He returns to Melbourne and shares his testimony of what happened, concluding that Burke "never understood the blacks."

== Cast ==
- Jack Thompson as Robert O'Hara Burke
- Nigel Havers as William John Wills
- Greta Scacchi as Julia Matthews
- Matthew Fargher as John King
- Chris Haywood as Tom McDonagh
- Ralph Cotterill as Charley Gray
- Drew Forsythe as William Brahe
- Ron Blanchard as Bill Patton
- Monroe Reimers as Dost Mahomet
- Barry Hill as George Landells
- Hugh Keays-Byrne as Ambrose Kyte
- Roderick Williams as Bill Wright
- Arthur Dignam as Sir William Stawell
- Ken Goodlet as Dr. John Macadam
- Peter Collingwood as Dr. William Wills
- Edward Hepple as Ludwig Becker
- Susannah Harker as Bessie Wills
- Martin Redpath as The Mayor of Melbourne
- Julie Hamilton as Mrs. Kyte
- Nick Carrafa as Edwin Welch
- John Gregg as Alfred Erwin
- Deryck Barnes as Tom Payne
- Les Foxcroft as Harry
- John Penman as Fat Kid
- Redmond Phillips as Commissioner May
- Mark Pegler as Journalist
- Mary Acres as Julia's Dresser
- David Bracks as Lawyer
- Lucy Bell as Kyte's Daughter
- Matthew Savage as Christopher Marsden

== Production ==
Graeme Clifford was an Australian who had become a leading editor in Hollywood before moving into directing. In 1978 he approached EMI Films, which had commissioned a script from Terence Rattigan about the Burke and Wills expedition. When that project did not proceed, Clifford hired fellow Australian expatriate Michael Thomas to write a screenplay. David Williams of Greater Union provided early financial assistance.

Clifford later received finance from Hoyts-Edgley. The film was the second most expensive Australian production of its time, after Mad Max Beyond Thunderdome. Greater Union backed the rival film Wills & Burke.

Charlton Heston was once interested in playing Burke, but Clifford said that he had always envisaged Jack Thompson in the role. After seeing Chariots of Fire, Clifford wanted Nigel Havers to play Wills. Actors Equity opposed Havers’s casting, but the objection was overturned at arbitration.

Filming began in September 1984 and continued for 13 weeks. The production was based for much of the shoot at Burke's Grave near Innamincka at Cooper Creek in Queensland, where the expedition’s final events took place. The National Film and Sound Archive lists production locations including Cooper Creek, Innamincka, Royal Park in Melbourne, Kellyville, Darwin, Alice Springs and Coober Pedy. A Getty Images caption also identifies Kellyville as a filming location.

The production’s locations did not all correspond to places on the expedition’s route. The expedition's departure from Melbourne’s Royal Park was filmed at Kellyville near Sydney; the Sturt Stony Desert sequences and Tropical landscape around Boulia was filmed near Coober Pedy and Alice Springs; the north coast scenes at the Gulf of Carpentaria were filmed near Darwin. This resulted in the film depicting vastly different landscapes to those the expedition experienced, other than those scenes filmed around Innamincka. The film also changes the expedition’s history: it depicts Burke and Wills reaching the beach at the Gulf coast, although they turned back in at flooded salt water flats before reaching the sea.

The film’s English sequence identifies Wills in the maze as “Hever Castle, Kent, England, 1854”. The historical maze episode associated with Wills took place in 1851 at Hampton Court Palace. By 1854 Wills had left England and migrated to Australia. The film therefore names Hever Castle for an episode historically associated with Hampton Court. The location where this sequence was filmed is a separate question from the place identified by the film and has not been established by the sources cited here.

Additional filming was completed in England some months later. Painter Sidney Nolan visited the set and was the film’s official painter.

== Release ==
The film premiered in Melbourne on 2 November 1985 before Prince Charles and Lady Diana; the first Australian Royal Premiere. It opened in other Australian cities on 7 November 1985, was shown at the 1986 Cannes Film Festival in May, the Toronto Film Festival in September 1986 and was released worldwide in early 1986.

Burke & Wills performed disappointingly, grossing $1,567,000 at the box office in Australia. Jonathan Chissick later said "people in Australia were just not interested in seeing a picture about these two guys dying in the desert." The poor box office was also blamed on the poor reviews of Wills & Burke that was released at the same time.

The film was released in the US but also performed disappointingly there.

The film was released on VHS Video in Australia by Charter Entertainment in 1987 and released in the USA on 26 October 1988 by Nelson Entertainment. The film was released on laserdisc in the USA.

The film was released on DVD in 2014 through Umbrella Entertainment. Although released in Australia on the PAL format, the disc is region free. Umbrella Entertainment used the re-mastered version of the film produced by the National Film and Sound Archive (Australia) as part of the sesquicentenary activities in 2010; the sound was left as 2-speaker stereo. The DVD has no menu on the disc and the film is presented in its original 2.35:1 widescreen format.

== Reception ==
The film received mostly positive reviews. Variety called it "satisfying entertainment despite its length and seemingly downbeat subject."

=== Accolades ===
Award	Category	Subject	Result
AACTA Awards	Best Cinematography	Russell Boyd	Nominated
AACTA Awards	Best Original Music Score	Peter Sculthorpe	Nominated
AACTA Awards	Best Sound	Syd Butterworth	Nominated
AACTA Awards	Best Sound	Jeanine Chiavlo	Nominated
AACTA Awards	Best Sound	Peter Fenton	Nominated
AACTA Awards	Best Sound	Phil Heywood	Nominated
AACTA Awards	Best Sound	Lee Smith	Nominated
AACTA Awards	Best Costume Design	George Liddle	Nominated

== Miscellaneous ==
A 1975 British documentary series called The Explorers on the BBC featured the Australian expedition story in the episode titled Burke and Wills. Directed by Lord Snowdon, it was narrated by David Attenborough in the UK version (but by Anthony Quinn in the 1976 US broadcast version), and coincidentally the same Australian actor, Chris Haywood, who played Tom McDonagh also previously appeared in the British documentary released around a decade earlier. Moreover, in the same year as this film, Haywood also played a cameo role of the constable in the Burke & Wills spoof parody Wills & Burke (1985).

== See also ==
- Cinema of Australia
