= Wills & Burke =

1985 Australian black comedy film

- DVD cover
- Directed by: Bob Weis
- Written by: Philip Dalkin
- Based on: Burke and Wills expedition
- Produced by: Bob Weis; Margot McDonald
- Starring: Garry McDonald; Kim Gyngell; Nicole Kidman
- Cinematography: Nino Gaetano Martinetti
- Edited by: Edward McQueen-Mason
- Music by: Red Symonds; Paul Gabrowsky
- Production company: Stony Desert Productions
- Distributed by: Greater Union Film Distributors
- Release date: 24 October 1985
- Running time: 101 minutes
- Country: Australia
- Language: English
- Budget: A$1.75 million
- Box office: A$54,000 (Australia)

Wills & Burke (also known as The Wacky World of Wills & Burke and Wills & Burke: The Untold Story) is a 1985 Australian black comedy film about the Burke and Wills expedition. It opened a week before Burke & Wills, a serious drama about the expedition.

== Plot ==
In 1860, Robert O'Hara Burke and William John Wills are chosen to explore the Australian continent from south to north and back again. Just before the expedition departs, Burke proposes to young actress Julia Matthews, who has trouble remembering who he is.

John Macadam tries to sustain public interest by staging a musical play about the expedition. Julia demands the lead role and grows a beard to prove she can play Burke. The play opens around the time Burke and Wills die in the desert. John King survives the expedition and is found by a search party in 1861.

== Cast ==
- Garry McDonald as Robert O'Hara Burke
- Kym Gyngell as William John Wills
- Nicole Kidman as Julia Matthews
- Peter Collingwood as Sir William Stawell
- Mark Little as John King
- Jonathan Hardy as John Macadam
- Colin Hay as Publican
- Wynn Roberts as William Wright
- Alex Menglet as William Brahe
- Mark Mitchell as Carpenter

== Production ==
Philip Dalkin first wrote the story as a stage play, which Bob Weis read in 1978. He enjoyed it and at one stage thought of making it as a television miniseries before deciding on turning it into a feature film. It was shot over six weeks in and around Melbourne on a budget of $1.7 million.

== Release ==
After the release dates for Burke & Wills were set, Greater Union Film Distributors decided to release the film before it, opening it two weeks before in Melbourne and one week before in Sydney.

The film received negative reviews and was not a success at the box office, closing after just three weeks with a gross of A$54,000 in Australia on a A$1.75 million budget.

Due to opening in advance of Burke & Wills, some critics believed that the film was a parody of Burke & Wills but Weis claimed that this was not his intention.
