= Yandruwandha people =

Aboriginal Australian people

The Yandruwandha, alternatively known as Jandruwanta, are an Aboriginal Australian people living in the Lakes area of South Australia, south of Cooper Creek and west of the Wangkumara people.

== Language ==
Yandruwandha is a generic term referring to a number of dialects: Yawarrawarrka, Nhirppi, Matja, Parlpamardramardra, Ngananhina, Ngapardajdhirri and Ngurawola. It belongs to the Karna group of Karnic languages The best known version is that recorded by Gavan Breen from informants in Innamincka.

== Country ==
The Yandruwandha ranged over an estimated 10,900 square miles (28,000 km^{2}) of their tribal lands, which extended, according to Norman Tindale, from an area south of Cooper Creek, namely from Innamincka to Carraweena. This area also included Strzelecki Creek.

== History ==
The Yandruwandha played a significant role in key moments of the Burke and Wills expedition. Oral lore conserved among them, according to a descendant, Aaron Paterson, has it that William John Wills, who recorded some of their words, made a good impression on the elders, who provided him with shelter in a walpa shared with an as yet uninitiated youth. While Burke and Wills died, the only man to survive, John King, did so because he found sanctuary with the Yandruwandha, among whom he was eventually found by Edwin Welch, a surveyor with Alfred William Howitt, who had been dispatched to find the missing explorers.

Many Yandruwandha people fell victims to the 1919 flu pandemic.

== Customs ==
They practised male circumcision.

== Native title ==
The Yandruwandha Yawarrawarrka filed a petition to have their land rights recognised in 1988. In 2015, their native title was determined by a Federal Court over some 40,000 square kilometres (15,000 sq mi) of the outback, covering pastoral leases, and including Coongie Lakes National Park, the Innamincka Regional Reserve and the Strzelecki Regional Reserve.

== Notable people ==
- Murtee Johnny (born c.1888; died Adelaide 1979) was the last member of the Yandruwanda of the Strzelecki Track, many of whom died in the flu pandemic that spread through the area in 1919. He was an accomplished stockman, working on the Mount Hopeless in the Flinders Ranges.

== Alternative names ==
- Yandruwunta, Yandruwonta, Yantruwanta, Jendruwonta, Yandra Wandra
- Yandrawontha, Yanderawantha, Yantowannta, Jandruwalda
- Yanduwulda.
- Endawarra
- Innamouka (loose transcription of the toponym Innamincka)

Notable Yandruwandha people are: Danpidli, who died in 1921, many photos appeared of him taken by visitors to Innaminka worded various ways. According to his grandson, Mangili known as Benny Kerwin, Benny was raised from age two, after his mother's death with child and Benny referred to Jimmy Marana and old Brolga as the last two men of the tribe who lived in the old was fully, prior to colonisation and that his grandad (mother's father) taught him the language, culture and put him through the rules of initiation (had him circumcised to enable him to take a wife). Audio recorings of Gavan Breen interviewing Benny Kerwin 1968 to Jan 7, 1976, the day before he died, held by A.I.A.T.S.I.S Canberra A.C.T. Jimmy Marana/Mariner assumed title as headman of the Pitjidi clan in 1897 after the death of his father, Minpidli (both father and son had breastplates maded and presented to them by Innamincka station manager, Alfred Walker, manager for 28 years who retired in 1907.

May, 1861 location, Cooper Creek between Yinimingka waterhole and Oontoo Waterhole William J Wills had deposited some of his journals, buried in the camel boxes near the DIG TREE, and was returning east down the creek, when he spotted a friend 'chief pitchery across the creek gesturing and calling out to him to cross, which he did, he was led back to the native pitchery clan camp and they hosted him two days supplying all the fish he could eat plus a big baked rat, nardoo cakes til he was 'positively full'.

There was only one headman of the clan at that time and that Minpidli (breastplate reads MINNPIDLEY) was the person Wills was referring to. burkeandwills.net

== Notes and references ==
=== References ===
- Breen, Gavan (2015a) [First published 2004]. Innamincka Talk: A grammar of the Innamincka dialect of Yandruwandha. Australian National University. ISBN 978-1-921-93420-9.
- Breen, Gavan (2015b) [First published 2004]. Innamincka Words: Yandruwandha dictionary and stories. Australian National University. ISBN 978-1-921-93422-3.
- Gage, Nicola (16 December 2015). "Native title granted by Federal Court for Yandruwandha Yawarrawarrka people". ABC News.
- Hercus, Luise A. (1980). "'How we danced the Mudlunga': Memories of 1901 and 1902" (PDF). Aboriginal History. 4 (1): 1–31.
- Paterson, Aaron (2013). "Introduction: A Yandruwandha Perspective". In Clark, Ian; Cahir, Fred (eds.). The Aboriginal Story of Burke and Wills: Forgotten Narratives. Csiro Publishing. pp. xiii=xvi. ISBN 978-0-643-10809-7.
- Phoenix, Dave (2011). "Introduction". In Joyce, E. B.; McCann, D. A. (eds.). Burke and Wills: The Scientific Legacy of the Victorian Exploring Expedition. Csiro Publishing. pp. x–xxiv. ISBN 978-0-643-10334-4.
- Tindale, Norman Barnett (1974). "Jandruwanta (SA)". Aboriginal Tribes of Australia: Their Terrain, Environmental Controls, Distribution, Limits, and Proper Names. Australian National University Press. ISBN 978-0-708-10741-6. Archived from the original on 8 April 2017.
