= Mitaka =

Mitaka may refer to:

- Mitaka, Tokyo, a city in Japan
  - Mitaka Station, a railway station
- 1088 Mitaka, an asteroid
- Mitaka people, an indigenous ethnic group of Australia
- Mitaka (observatory software), an observatory software developed by National Astronomical Observatory of Japan
- Shun Mitaka (三鷹 瞬), a fictional character in the Maison Ikkoku manga series
- Asa Mitaka (三鷹アサ), a fictional character in the Chainsaw Man manga series

== See also ==
- Mithaka
