= Mary Ann Coomindah =

Australian herbalist, healer, domestic servant (1865–1929)

Mary Ann Coomindah or Maghroolara (c. 1865 - January 1939) was a Karuwali/Mithaka woman who worked as a gdanja (herbalist), healer, smoke telegrapher and domestic servant who was also well known for her singing skills. In the Mithaka language her name Maghaoolara means 'the Singer'.

She was the tribal sister of Moses Yoolpee.

== Biography ==
Commindah was born in the Diamantina River region of the Channel Country in Queensland, and was a part of the Emu Tribe. Very little is known of her life before she began working for William and Laura Duncan at Mooraberrie Station in 1899. She was selected for service and trained by Laura, and was working at Mooraberrie when the Duncans had their first of four children, who she helped raise and to whom she was a second mother. It is also believed that she acted as a wet nurse for them. Commindah's role increased the longer she worked for the family, especially after William Duncan died in 1907, and she became head of the domestic staff.

One of the Duncan children was Alice Duncan-Kemp. Commindah recognised Alice's interest in learning Mithaka lore and culture, and passed on traditional knowledge and skills to her, including bush medicine. Other Aboriginal people living at the station did the same, including Moses Yoolpee, Maggie Muttamurrie and her husband Bogie, who was a respected hunter and tracker. At a ceremony performed at Kulkia Hill, Commindah gave Duncan-Kemp her Mithaka name, Pinningarra, which translated as "the Leaf Spirit".

Commindah was highly educated in tribal knowledge and was consequently considered a polymath, particularly because of her understanding of smoke telegraphy, which took years of training and intergenerational knowledge to master. The codes required to successfully interpret signals were precise, mathematical and cross-lingual.

On one occasion, Commindah had taken the girls on a day trip and, by the afternoon, they were 16 kilometres (9.9 mi) from the homestead. She realised that there was a fire threatening them and their ability to return home. She and the girls took refuge in a lake and she had to protect the children with her body to prevent them being burned by falling ash and debris. She received second degree burns to her body but her charges were unharmed.

Commindah worked at Mooraberrie until her death in 1929, and her husband Bogie died soon after.

== Legacy ==
- Mount Mary in the Diamantina National Park is believed to have been named for Commindah.
- Knowledge that she passed on to Duncan-Kemp was instrumental to the Mithaka peoples 2015 native title determination.
