= William Strutt (artist) =

English artist (1825-1915)

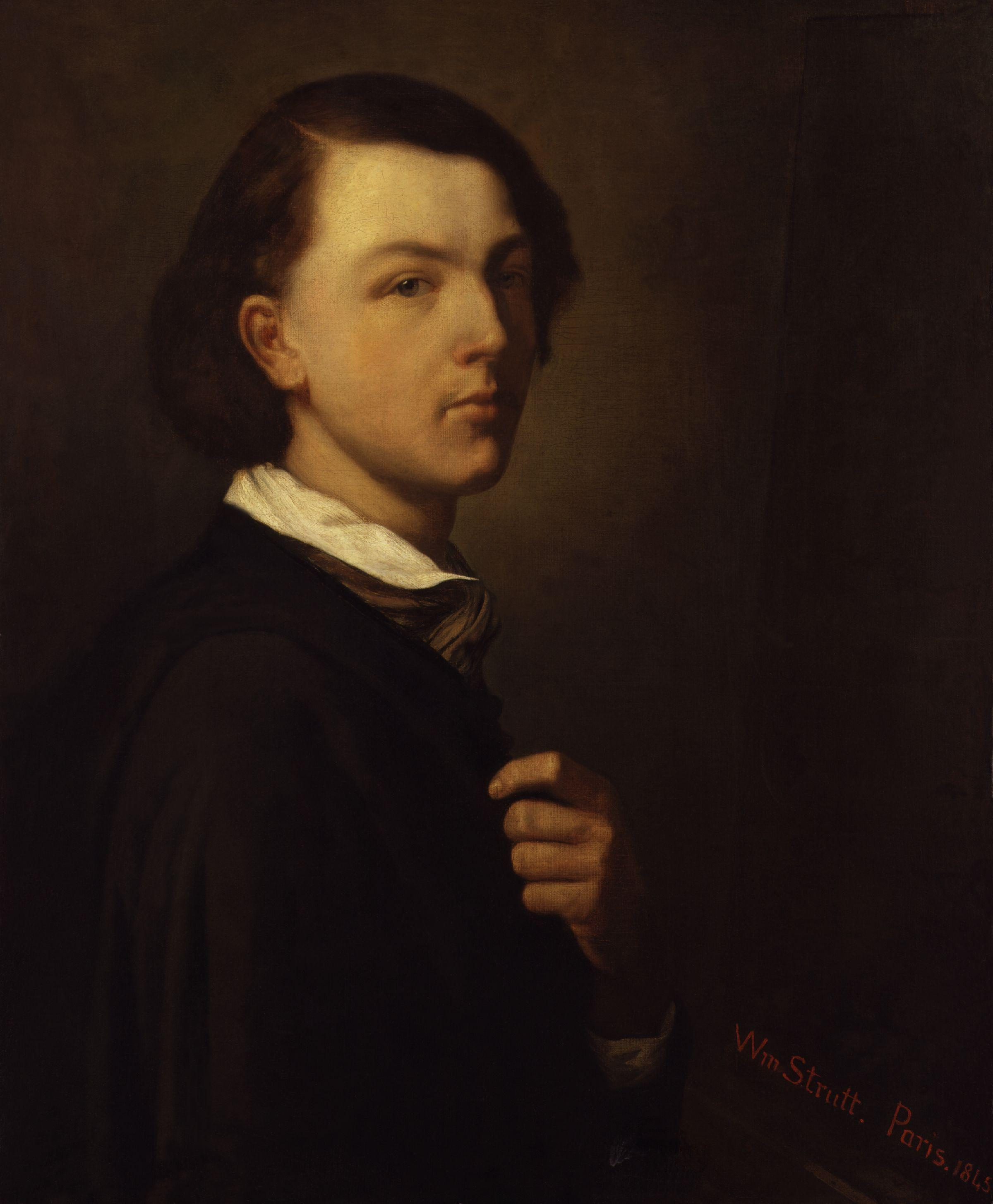
- Self portrait of Strutt, 1845
- Born: 3 July 1825; Teignmouth, Devon, England
- Died: 3 January 1915 (aged 89); Wadhurst, East Sussex, England
- Spouse: Sarah Agnes Hague

William Strutt RBA FZS (3 July 1825 – 3 January 1915) was an English artist.

Strutt was born in Teignmouth, Devon, England, and came from a family of artists. His grandfather, Joseph Strutt, was a well-known author and artist, his father, William Thomas Strutt, was a good miniature painter. In 1838 William Strutt moved to Paris and joined the atelier of French neoclassical painter Michel Martin Drolling. In 1839, he enrolled in the Ecole des Beaux-Arts fine arts school with his elder brother Thomas. He enjoyed a student life studying figurative and history painting in Paris, but moved back to London in 1848 due to political unrest. In response to a near-breakdown and problems with his eyes, Strutt decided to visit Australia, arriving 5 July 1850 on the Culloden, where he then married.

In Melbourne, Strutt found employment as an illustrator on the short-lived Illustrated Australian Magazine, published by Thomas Ham, as there was little demand for the figurative and history paintings for which he was trained. Some of his designs did, however, lead to commissions, including a design for a new postage stamp, and an Anti-Transportation League card. Despite the lack of interest for major history paintings in Melbourne, Strutt continued to sketch suitable subjects, including the 'Black Thursday' bushfires, which swept over the colony on 6 February 1851. It was from these sketches that Strutt composed one of his most notable paintings some 10 years later, Black Thursday, 6 February. 1851, 1864, which depicted animals and men fleeing from the fire.

In February 1852, Strutt joined the growing tide of men travelling to the gold-fields surrounding Ballarat, Victoria. Despite working in the gold fields for eighteen months he found little success. He returned to Melbourne in mid-1853 and became actively involved in the city's cultural scene, undertaking a number of portrait commissions and joining the Victorian Society of Fine Arts – which in 1856 became the Victorian Artists Society – as a founding member.

Strutt's interest in depicting the notable events of the colony was piqued by the events surrounding the Victorian Exploring Expedition led by Burke and Wills in 1860–61. He made several studies of their preparations at Royal Park, Melbourne, and followed the expedition to its first camp at Essendon, Victoria. Strutt also collected first-hand accounts from the rescue party and from John King, the expedition's sole survivor, upon his return.

Strutt left the colony of Victoria in 1862. A highly religious man, he dreaded bringing up his children in what he perceived to be a godless society. Returning to England where he completed two major works based on Australian sketches, Black Thursday, 6 February 1851 and Bushrangers, Victoria, Australia, 1852. He continued to draw on his Australian sketches to produce major oil paintings, including The Burial of Burke. In 1861, he painted imagined scenes from the First Taranaki War based on sketches that he made during him time in New Zealand from 1855 to 1856. The painting View of Mt Egmont, Taranaki, New Zealand, taken from New Plymouth, with Maoris driving off settlers' cattle, was purchased by the Museum of New Zealand Te Papa Tongarewa in 2015 from the John Lawford Collection for NZ$1.5 million; it is the only significant oil painting from the 1850s or 1860s held by New Zealand's national museum. An exhibition of Strutt's paintings and sketches 'chiefly made in New Zealand and Australia' was held at the Corn Exchange, Chelmsford, Essex, from October to November 1866.

William Strutt died in Wadhurst, Sussex, England on 3 January 1915.

== Gallery ==
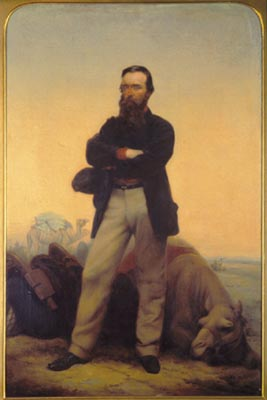
Robert O'Hara Burke, 1861, National Library of Australia

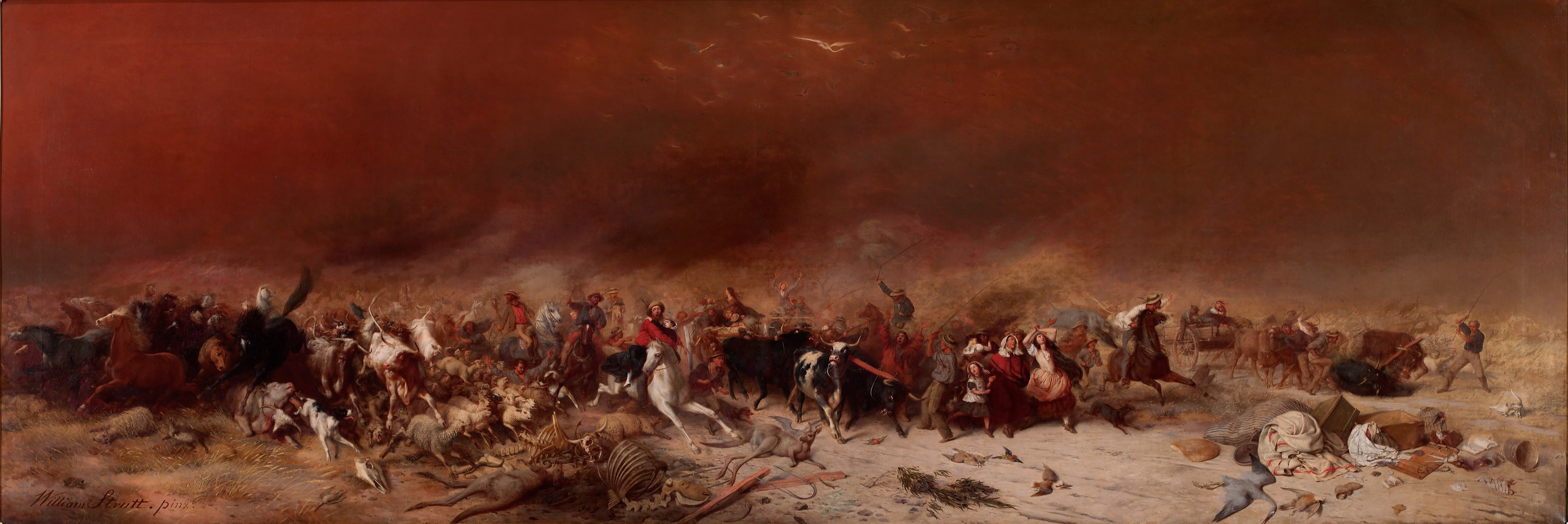
Black Thursday, February 6th. 1851, [1864], State Library Victoria, H28049

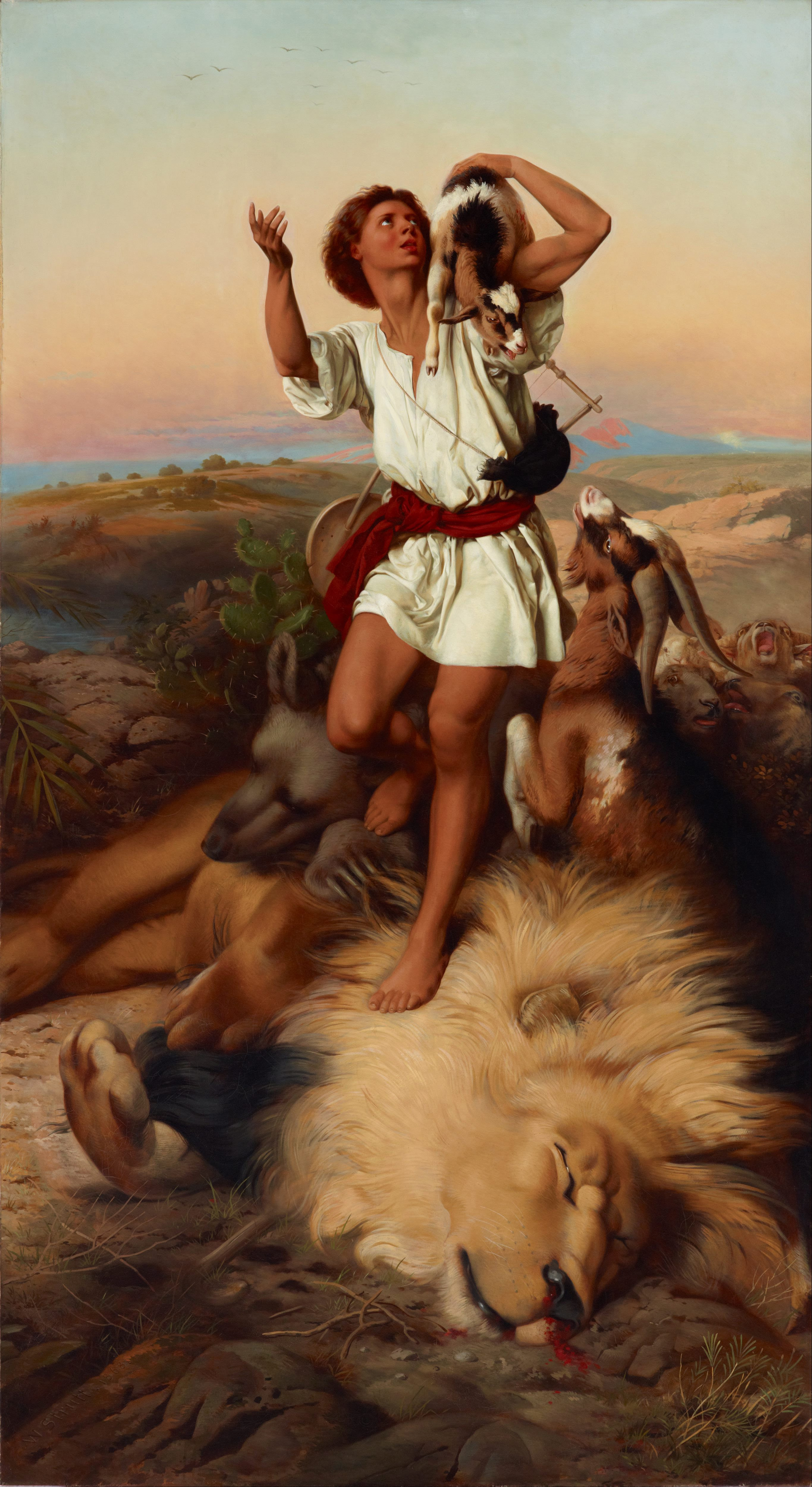
David's first victory, 1868, Art Gallery of New South Wales

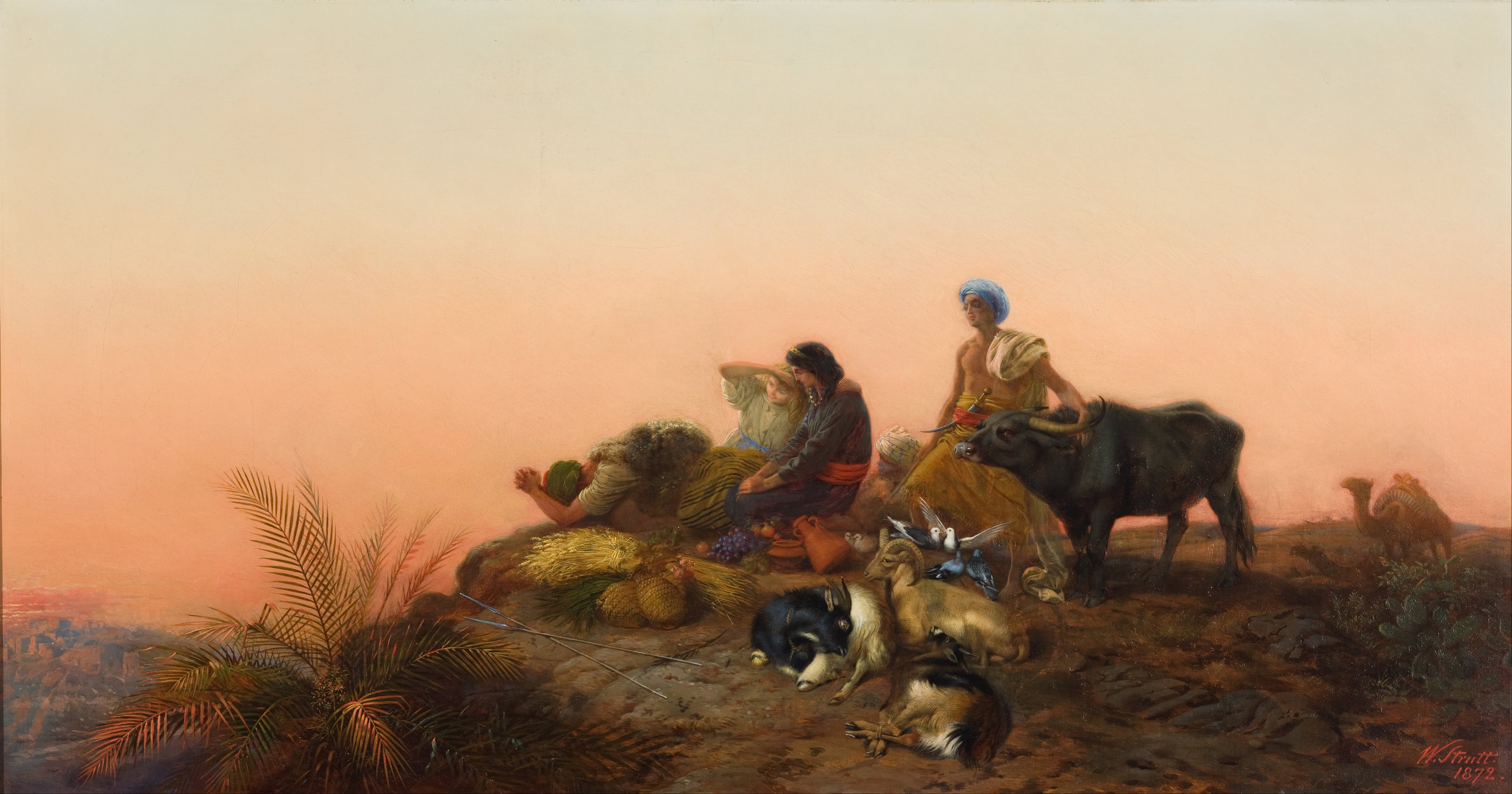
Jerusalem pilgrims, 1872, Art Gallery of South Australia

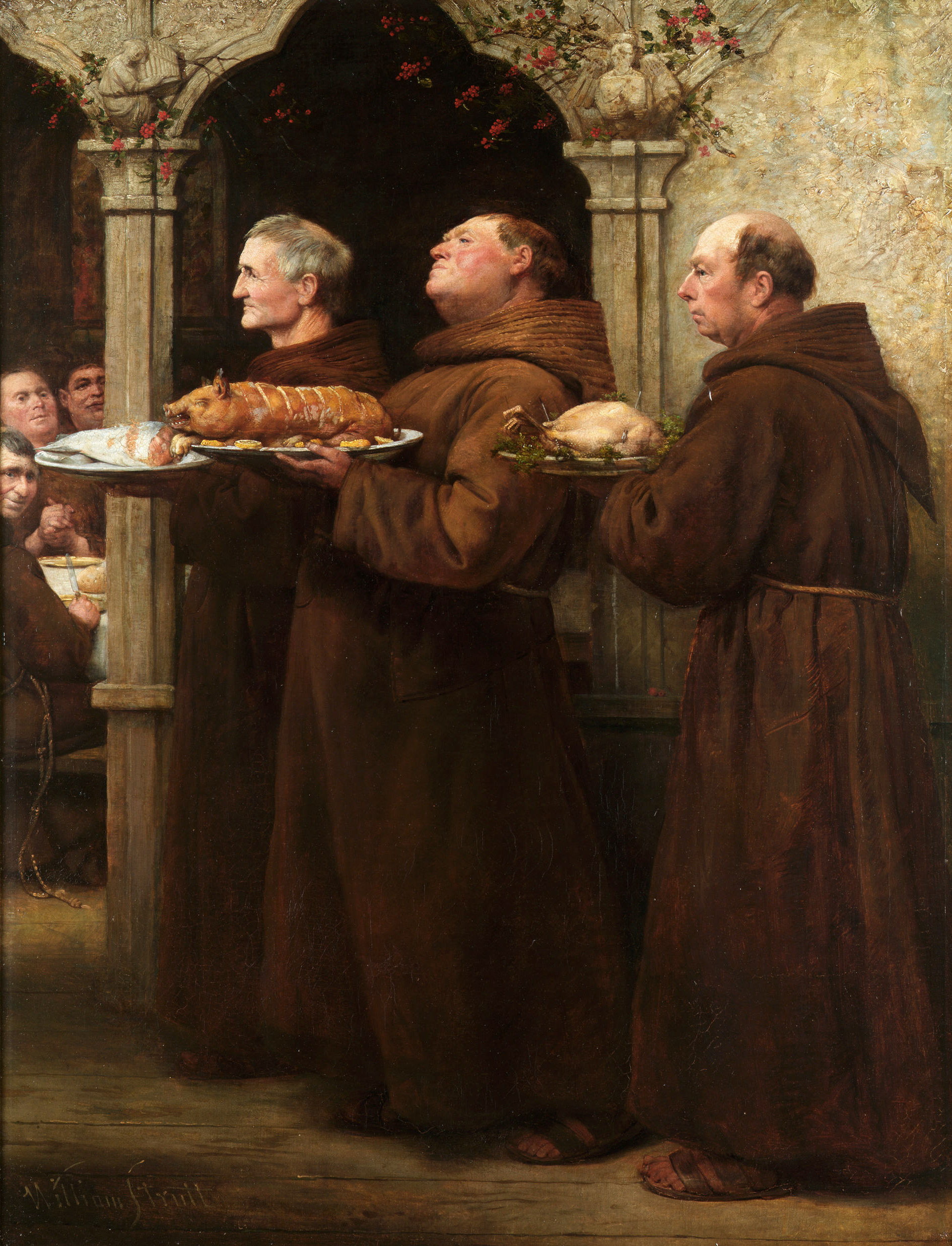
The Prior's Feast, 1915

== See also ==
- Australian art

== Publications ==
- William Strutt, The Australian journal of William Strutt, A.R.A., 1850–1862 (Sydney?: s.n., 1958).
- Heather Curnow, The life & art of William Strutt, 1825–1915 (Martinborough, N.Z.: Alister Taylor, 1980).
- William Strutt, Victoria the golden: scenes, sketches and jottings from nature, 1850–1862 (Melbourne: Library Committee, Parliament of Victoria, c1980).
- William Strutt, Cooey, or, The trackers of Glenferry (Canberra: National Library of Australia, 1989).
