= Moses Yoolpee =

(1865–1940) Karuwali–Mithaka elder and stockman)

Moses Yoolpee also recorded as Moses Mack and Budgeree Balyah (c. 1865 - 13 July 1940) was a Karuwali–Mithaka elder, stockman and tracker and translator for the Queensland Police. Despite being taken from his family at a young age he held significant amounts of the cultural knowledge of his people and spoke many Australian Aboriginal languages from the Channel Country region.

He was also a friend and mentor to author Alice Duncan-Kemp who he helped raise.

== Early life ==
Yoolpee was born at Farrars Creek in south-west Queensland and his birth coincided with the first permanent white colonisation of this region. Both of his parents died soon after his birth. It is not known how his mother died but his father, Moonie Budella, was killed in a fight; this left him to be raised by his mother's family.

In the late-1870s, when Yoolpee was around 10 years old he was taken from his family by a pastoralist, most likely John 'Jack' Mack to a sheep station in Victoria called 'Berry Bank' where he was very far away from home. While with the Mack family it appears that he was treated as family and he took on the Mack surname; also, while living with them, he attended Scotch College and this featured greatly in his later storytelling.

Yolpee lived with the Mack family until at least 1887 and, in the 1890s he decided to return to the Channel Country and travelled the 1,600 kilometres (990 mi) on foot which took a number of years. On his return journey, he took work along the way and he would later tell a journalist that an elderly woman he was working for 'for some months' proposed marriage to him but that he declined due to their 50 year age gap.

== Work in the pastoral industry ==
On his return to the Channel Country, Yoolpee began working at Mooraberrie Station as a stockman, where he was employed by William and Laura Duncan. He worked there for many years and features heavily in the writings of their daughter Alice Duncan-Kemp. Duncan-Kemp was Yoolpee's friend and was mentored and taught by him. He would often take her and her siblings on mustering trips where he taught them bush lore and handicraft. It is perhaps because of his influence that she believed that "[Aboriginal people] were the true owners of the land".

While Yoolpee had been away many of his family had experienced and been displaced by violent 'frontier conflict', with many forced on to missions or pastoral stations. Mooraberrie was considered by many Karuwali and Mithaka peoples to be a sanctuary due to the management of the Duncan family who encouraged cross-cultural respect and learning.

Yoolpee also worked at other cattle stations and, between approximately 1923 and 1930, he also worked as a translator and tracker for the Birdsville Police; he was highly valued for his ability to speak almost every dialect from the region and being able to lip-read from a distance.

At Mooraberrie, Yoolpee lived in a gunyah, a form of humpy, with the other Aboriginal stockmen and partnered with Maggie Muttamurrie, who also worked on the station, until her death in 1923. After Muttamurrie's death he lived with Bental (also recorded as 'Pinto') until her death in 1939.

== Later life ==
There is conjecture around the end of Yoolpee's life but it is known that, near the end, he refused to speak English and it has been suggested that this was a silent protest.

Duncan-Kemp has stated that he died on his own country and was buried there but other sources show that 'Moses Mack' died at Longreach on 13 July 1940 of pancreatic cancer.

== Legacy ==
- Moses Cone, a mountain in Diamantina National Park, is said to have been named for him.
- Knowledge that he passed on to Duncan-Kemp and his tribal sister Mary Ann Coomindah was instrumental to the Mithaka peoples 2015 native title determination.
