= Yandruwandha =

Yandruwandha may be,

- Yandruwandha people
- Yandruwandha language
