= Julia Mathews =

Actress and singer

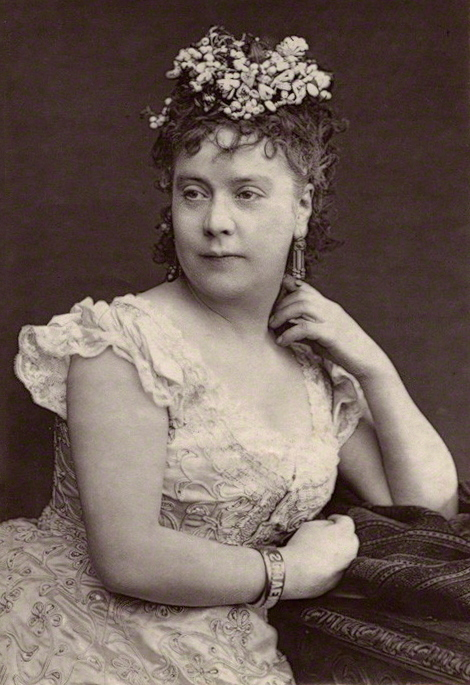
Julia Matthews

Julia Matthews or Julia Mathews (14 December 1842 – 19 May 1876) was an English actress and singer who was popular on the stage, particularly in Melbourne.

== Life ==
Matthews was born in London in 1842. Her parents were Sarah (born Irviner) and James Mathews. Her father was a sailor who also made artificial flowers. The family moved to Sydney where she made her debut on the stage of the Royal Victoria Theatre.

She received and refused a marriage proposal from Robert O'Hara Burke in 1860, shortly before the Burke and Wills expedition. Burke had made her his sole heir. She was one of the first to call for a search party. Matthews died aged just 33, in St. Louis, Missouri.

She was played by Greta Scacchi in Burke & Wills (1985) and by Nicole Kidman in Wills & Burke (1985).

It has been claimed that the film actress Jessie Matthews (1907–1981) was a descendant.
