= Marulta =

Aboriginal Australian people

The Marulta were an indigenous Australian people of the state of Queensland, Australia.

== Language ==
The Marulta spoke Marrulha, one of several dialects of a Karnic language, similar to Mithaka.

== Country ==
The Marulta were a people of Lake Barrolka, with, according to Norman Tindale, an estimated 3,700 square miles (9,600 km^{2}) of territory, extending south as far as Lake Yamma Yamma, and west to the Beal Range. Their northeasterly reach ran to the vicinity of Opalville and Cooper Creek.

== Alternative name ==
- Marula
- Marunga
- Marrulha

== Sources ==
- "AIATSIS map of Indigenous Australia". AIATSIS. 3 June 2015.
- Breen, Gavan (1990). Salvage Studies of Western Queensland Aboriginal Languages. Pacific Linguistics. ISBN 978-0-858-83401-9.
- Dixon, Robert M. W. (2002). Australian Languages: Their Nature and Development. Vol. 1. Cambridge University Press. ISBN 978-0-521-47378-1.
- Howitt, Alfred William (1904). The native tribes of south-east Australia (PDF). Macmillan.
- Howitt, Alfred William; Siebert, Otto (January–June 1904). "Legends of the Dieri and kindred tribes of Central Australia". Journal of the Anthropological Institute of Great Britain and Ireland. 34: 100–129. doi:10.2307/2843089. JSTOR 2843089.
- Tindale, Norman Barnett (1974). "Marulta (QLD)". Aboriginal Tribes of Australia: Their Terrain, Environmental Controls, Distribution, Limits, and Proper Names. Australian National University Press. ISBN 978-0-708-10741-6.
