= Alice Duncan-Kemp =

Australian writer and Indigenous rights activis

- Born: Alice Monkton Duncan; 3 June 1901 Charleville, Queensland, Australia
- Died: 4 January 1988 (aged 86) Oakey, Queensland, Australia
- Occupation: Memoirist, autobiographer, Indigenous culture recorder, Indigenous rights activist

Alice Monkton Duncan-Kemp (1901–1988) was an Australian writer and Indigenous rights activist.

== Biography ==
Born on 3 June 1901 at Charleville, Queensland, Duncan-Kemp was the daughter of William and Laura Duncan (née Davis). She grew up with her two sisters on a leasehold property west of Windorah. Her only brother died in 1903 and her father in 1907, leaving his widow to raise three girls.

Her moher elected to remain on the remote property, raising cattle with the assistance of local Aboriginal people, hired hands and, when they were old enough, Duncan-Kemp and her two sisters. One of the family's domestic servants was Mary Ann Coomindah. She acted as a wet nurse for Alice and worked for the family until her death on 1939.

As well as Coomindah, she was taught and mentored by Moses Yoolpee, one of the stockmen. He often took her and her sister on mustering trips where he taught them bush lore and handicraft. He and his wife, Maggie Muttamurrie, were fiercely protective of the girls.

Educated at home for many years, Duncan-Kemp completed her schooling at Spreydon College in Toowoomba as a boarder.

She married New Zealander Frederick Clifford Kemp in November 1923 in Longreach with whom she had five children. Previously a grazier, her husband moved into banking and the family moved around rural Queensland with him.

Well ahead of her time, she believed that "Aborigines were the true owners of the land", and understood the devastating effect that white settlement had had on them. Yvette Steinhauer, in a 2009 review of Kemp's work, praised the "value of her books as cultural products" providing "rare documentation of the frontier conflict and the Aboriginal resistance movements" taking place near her home.

Duncan-Kemp retired to Oakey in Queensland and died there on 4 January 1988.

In 2020, her daughter-in-law, Dawn Duncan-Kemp, published Those Bloody Duncans: A history of Mooraberrie, 1860–1998, using unpublished material written by Alice, including "The Days of My Years" (1942).

== Works ==
- Our Sandhill Country (1933) memoir
- Where Strange Paths Go Down (1952)
- Our Channel Country (1961)
- Where Strange Gods Call (1968)
- People of the Grey Wind: Life with a stone age people (2005)
