= Mount Hopeless (South Australia) =

Mountain in South Australia

Mount Hopeless (Maiurru Mitha Vambata)
- Location within South Australia

Highest point
- Elevation: 128 m (420 ft)
- Coordinates: 29.700°S 139.675°E

Geography
- Location: Murnpeowie, South Australia, Australia

Mount Hopeless / Maiurru Mitha Vambata is in the Flinders Ranges in South Australia, south-west of Lake Blanche. It is little more than a stony rise of 127 metres. It was over-named by the explorer Edward Eyre.

In June 1840, Eyre left Adelaide with the aim of leading an expedition to the ‘centre’ of the Australian continent – the first colonist to make such an attempt. But in early September he was in despair. The land was dry. Most of the water he encountered was salty and it seemed to him that Adelaide was cut off from the interior by a great horseshoe shaped salt lake. On 2 September that year he climbed a stony rise which he named ‘Mount Hopeless’. As he explained, ‘cheerless and hopeless indeed was the prospect before us.’ The great salt lake, he went on, ‘was now visible to the north and to the east; and I had at last ascertained, beyond all doubt, that its basin, commencing near the head of Spencer's Gulf, and following the course of Flinders range (bending round its northern extreme to the southward), constituted those hills the termination of the island of South Australia, for such I imagine it once to have been. This closed all my dreams as to the expedition...’ (Edward Eyre, Journals Of Expeditions Of Discovery Into Central Australia)

Robert O'Hara Burke tried several times to reach this outpost in 1861 when he became stranded with William John Wills and John King on Cooper Creek but he failed and returned to Cooper Creek, where he and Wills died shortly after.
