= Lake Yamma Yamma =

Lake in Queensland, Australia

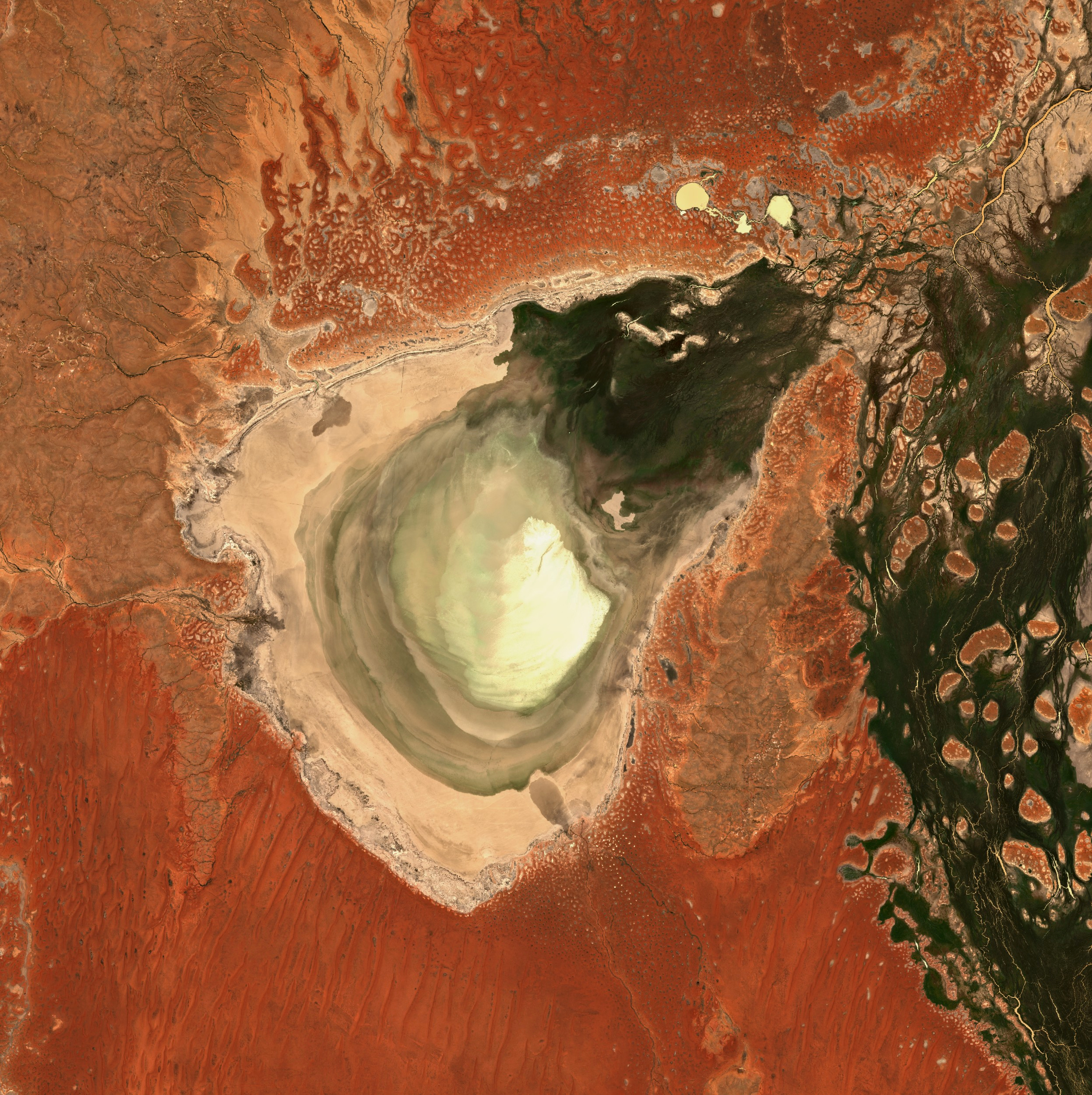
- Sentinel-2 image (2022)

- Location within Queensland
- Location: Channel Country, Queensland
- Coordinates: 26°16′40″S 141°27′31″E
- Primary inflows: Yamma Creek, Cooper Creek
- Basin countries: Australia
- Surface area: 72,000 ha (720 km^{2}; 280 sq mi)

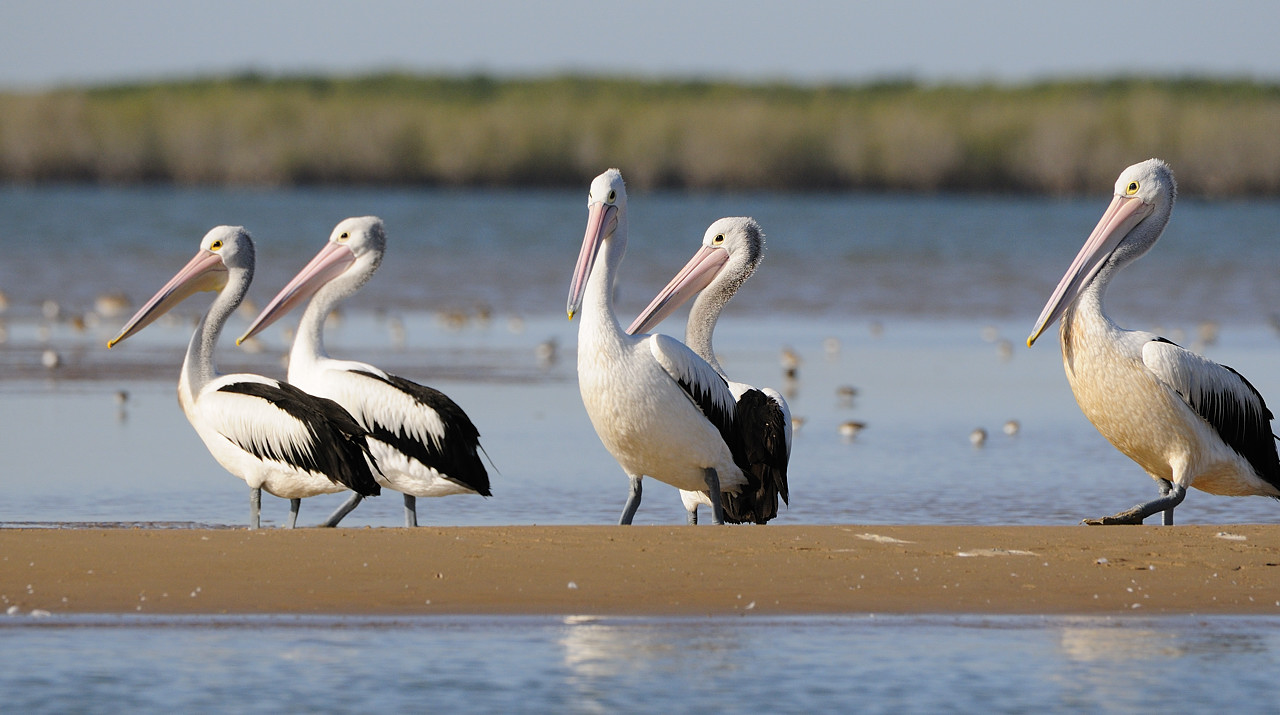
The lake is an important area for Australian pelicans

Lake Yamma Yamma is an ephemeral lake on the Cooper Creek system in the arid Channel Country of south-western Queensland, Australia. The lake, which is sometimes called Lake Mackillop, is the largest inland ephemeral lake in Queensland.

== Description ==
The lake only holds water following major floods on Cooper Creek. When filled the lake covers 72,000 ha (720 km^{2}; 280 sq mi). It fills to capacity only about once every 25–30 years, most recently in 2025. The lake waters are fresh immediately after filling, but become increasingly saline as the lake dries out. When dry, the lake bed's cracking grey clay soils support extensive grasslands dominated by rat's tail couch. Several ephemeral forbs grow among the couch following rain or minor flooding. The north-eastern section supports open lignum shrubland with patches of open woodland dominated by coolabah and Belalie.

== Birds ==
The lake, with its associated seasonal claypans and the nearby Barrolka Lakes to the north-east, has been identified by BirdLife International as a 1,218 km^{2} (470 mi^{2}) Important Bird Area (IBA) because it has supported over 1% of the world populations of plumed whistling-ducks, sharp-tailed sandpipers and Australian pelicans, as well as providing habitat for Australian bustards. A large colony of Australian pelicans breeds on an island at the north-eastern end of the lake. The Barrolka Lakes hold several cormorant colonies. Other birds recorded in substantial numbers include hardheads, white-headed stilts, glossy ibises, grey teals, black-tailed nativehens, Australian pratincoles, whiskered terns and Pacific black ducks, with smaller numbers of freckled ducks and white-winged black terns.

== See also ==
- List of lakes of Australia
