= Edwin Welch =

English surveyor, photographer, writer & journalist (1838-1916)

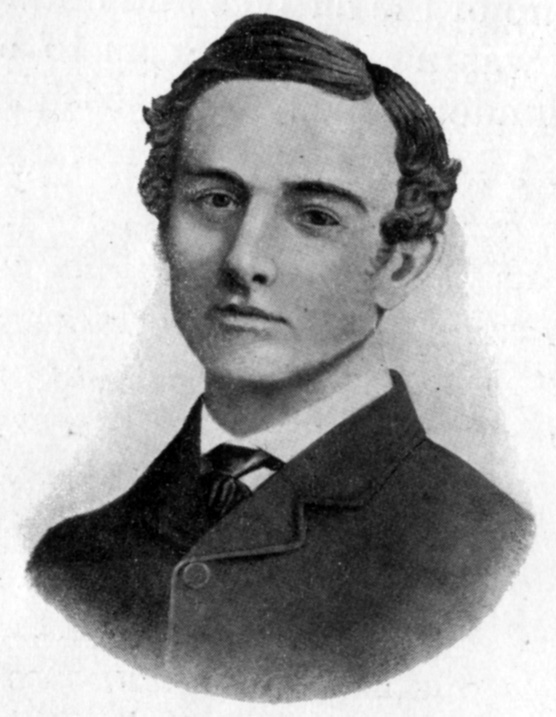
Edwin James Welch

Edwin James Welch (26 December 1838 – 24 September 1916) was an English naval cadet, surveyor, photographer, newspaper proprietor, writer and journalist. Welch discovered John King, sole survivor of the Burke and Wills expedition.

== Early life ==
Welch was born in Falmouth, Cornwall, a son of Commander David Welch, R.N. He was educated at Bluecoat School, Hertford and at the Royal Hospital School, Greenwich. He entered the Royal Navy as a cadet in 1853, and whilst still in his teens saw active service with Sir Charles Napier during the Crimean War, as Master's Assistant, including assisting with the ship's navigation.

Welch was present at the destruction of Hango Head forts, and the bombardment and capture of Bomarsund. He was also involved in the bombardment of Kertch and was present at the capture of Sebastopol. He continued to wear, throughout his life, the three medals and Sebastopol clasp which were awarded to him.

At the Royal Hospital School he would have been instructed in mathematics as were necessary for the study of navigation and nautical astronomy, including geometry, algebra, and elementary trigonometry; and, in connection with these, the elements of astronomy, with mathematical and physical geography.

== Move to Australia ==
The Crimean War was concluded in 1856 and Welch travelled to Australia, attracted it seems by the prospect of finding gold. He did not find gold but drew on his experiences on the diggings to later write many newspaper articles on the subject.

We are fortunate in having an account of the first years after his arrival. It was recalled, in June 1872, by a journalist on the Riverine Herald, that about 12 or 13 years earlier "there was a young man named Welch at Deniliquin," and that he had been, at one time a telegraph messenger and at another time a barman at a local hotel. The journalist went on to note that

When first he came to Deniliquin, about 1857, he was 'humping his swag' and for a time was in a very humble capacity here. He wandered, after this, through the country seeking work, and again returned to Deniliquin. He was somewhat eccentric in his habits.

== Burke and Wills ==
These humble beginnings in Australia were recalled by the journalist in order to contrast Welch's position soon after arrival in Australia, with his circumstances at the time the article was written, by which time Welch had taken part in an expedition to discover the fate of members of the Burke and Wills expedition and had recently been appointed acting inspector and relieving officer in The Electric Telegraph Department in Queensland.

By 1861 Welch had secured a position with the now Melbourne Observatory, then at Flagstaff Hill, Melbourne. No doubt he held the position because of the skills he possessed as a result of attending the Royal Naval School and the experience gained in the Royal Navy. Georg von Neumayer was director of the observatory and William John Wills was a work companion.

Neumayer was a member of the organising committee of the ill-fated Burke and Wills expedition, which set out in August 1860 to cross Australia from South to North. Wills was appointed surveyor and astronomical and meteorological observer for the expedition.

When, after 6 months, nothing was heard from the expedition, the Victorian Relief Expedition was organised and set out on 26 June 1861, under the leadership of Alfred William Howitt. Edwin James Welch, known, of course, to Neumeyer, went as surveyor, photographer and second-in-command. He had been given lessons in photography from Melbourne's leading studio of Batchelder and O’Neill before departure.

On 15 September 1861 Welch was searching along Cooper Creek, ahead of the main body, and discovered John King, who proved to be the sole survivor of that ill-fated expedition. King had been looked after by friendly aboriginals, though his emaciated form showed the suffering he had undergone.

At the end of October 1861 the party reached Pamamaroo Creek Camp on the Darling River and Howitt directed Welch and Weston Phillips, another member of the party, to accompany King back to Melbourne. Howitt and the rest of the party awaited with the animals and equipment for further instructions from the expedition committee.

A further expedition was organised to return to Cooper Creek and bring back the remains of Burke and Wills to Melbourne for a public funeral. Welch was also a member of that expedition.

== Collector and author ==
Welch's part in finding King is well known. Less well known is the fact that he was also one of the most successful collectors on any expedition into the Australian interior, collecting European and Aboriginal material, much of which has survived to this day. Some of the material appeared in From Melbourne to Myth curated by Tim Bonyhady for the National Library of Australia and exhibited in 2002. The exhibition was accompanied by a booklet of the same name, written by Bonyhady, in which details of the material are outlined.

In later life Welch wrote an account of the Burke and Wills Expedition and of the various expeditions which were subsequently mounted as a result of their disappearance. The manuscript, The Tragedy of Cooper's Creek, is held by the State Library of New South Wales. He also wrote other articles related to exploring and was a friend of Ernest Favenc who wrote The Explorers of Australia and Their Life-Work and The History of Australian Exploration.

In November 1865 Edwin Welch married Isabella Ord at Durah, Darling Downs, Queensland, at the residence of the bride's father. Durah is north of Dalby and, at the time, Welch was doing survey work in the area in connection with the construction of the telegraph line from Dalby to Camboon and on to Rockhampton. The line went through Durah, Hawkwood, and Banana.

In December 1866 Isabella gave birth to a son at Bowen, Queensland and in June 1868 a second son was born at the Telegraph Station, Durah. Then, on 5 September 1870 a daughter was born at the Telegraph Station, Hawkwood. It seems that by this time, Welch had secured a position as telegraph operator. The same edition of the newspaper which carried the notice of the birth of Welch's daughter also carried a notice regarding the death of his wife, a day afterwards, on 6 September 1870. She had died soon after giving birth to her daughter.

In mid 1872 Welch was appointed acting inspector and relieving officer with the electric Telegraph Department. Then, on 14 May 1873, in Brisbane, Welch married Marion Wilkin. A son, Eric Hardman Welch, was born on 20 November 1874.

In 1877 Welch was in partnership in a photographic business at Mackay, Queensland, and within two years Welch alone was carrying on the business. Afterwards he was founder of the newspaper, the Mackay Standard, which he later sold. He then purchased the St. George Standard, only to sell it and return to Victoria where he took over the Mansfield Courier.

A few years later Welch went to Sydney where he became associated with several newspapers, including the Evening News, The Bulletin, and The Echo. He also edited The Photographic Review.

Finally, he settled for The World's News and was still writing articles for this newspaper until the time of his death, using the pen names "E.J.W.," "Edwin Halstead" and "Alwyn Alverstoke." Welch wrote both factual and fictional articles and stories, the latter class including The Official Outlaw, Cressy Bend and Dinky Darbison: A Tale of the Early Sixties. In the latter story one may catch a glimpse of Welch himself as the character Harold Armstead, a "surveyor in the government service."

== Late life and legacy ==
Welch's obituary writer at the World's News had this to say about his character:

"As a conversationalist, Mr. Welch had few equals. As a story-teller he was inimitable, and his knowledge of Australia was without limit. The trouble was that he could never be induced to talk much of himself and his varied career. But when he did he held the listeners spell-bound. Even if he had pronounced views on a variety of subjects, he was always tolerant towards opponents, and as a friend he was warm-hearted and true."

Welch was elected F.R.G.S., London and, in 1899, F.R.C.I. Welch's second wife, Marion (née Wilkin), died on 25 July 1913 in Brisbane, Queensland.

On 24 September 1916, Edwin James Welch died at Petersham, New South Wales, where he had been living for about 10 years. He died as a result of heart failure, and was buried in the Waverley Cemetery.

== Bibliography ==
- "Dinky Darbison: A Tale of the Early Sixties," by Alwyn Alverstoke
- "The Official Outlaw," by Edwin Halstead
- "Cressy Bend," by Edwin Halstead
- "The Tragedy of Cooper's Creek," unpublished manuscript, n.d, c. 190-?, Angus & Robertson Collection at State Library of New South Wales. This manusacript has been transcribed and the text may be viewed online.
