= Mithaka language =

Extinct Australian Aboriginal language

Mithaka
- Native to: Queensland
- Ethnicity: Mitaka
- Extinct: (date missing)
- Language family: Pama–Nyungan: Karnic; Karna; Mithaka
- Dialects: Midhaga; ? Karruwali (Garuwali); ? Marrulha (Marrula, Marulta)

Language codes
- ISO 639-3: rxw Karuwali, Garuwali
- Glottolog: mith1235
- AIATSIS: L34 Mithaka, L35 Karuwali, L33 Marulta
- ELP: Mithaka

Mithaka (also Midhaga, Mitaka) is an extinct Australian Aboriginal language in the Barcoo Shire of Western Queensland spoken by the Mitaka people.

== Classification and dialects ==
Karruwali (Garuwali) and Marulta (Marrulha, Marrula) are counted as dialects per Dixon (2002).

Breen thinks Mithaka, Marula, and Marunuda may be the same language but does not know whether they are alternative names or distinct dialects of the same language.

However, Bowern (2001) states that there is not enough evidence to classify them, or even to establish that they are Karnic languages.
