= Robert O'Hara Burke =

Irish soldier, police officer & explorer

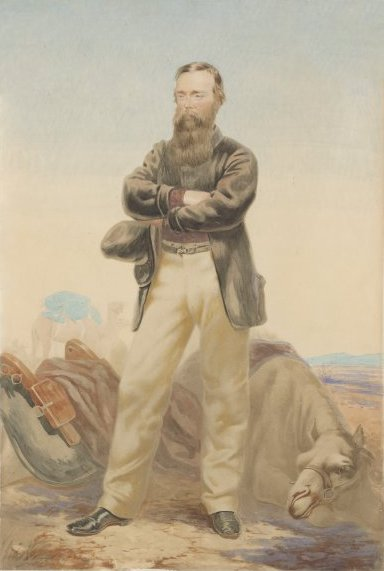
- Robert O'Hara Burke (painted by William Strutt)
- Born: 6 May 1821; St Clerans, Craughwell, County Galway, Ireland
- Died: 28 June 1861 (aged 40); Cooper Creek, South Australia, Australia
- Occupations: Soldier, police officer, explorer
- Years active: 1841−1861
- Known for: Death after leading the Burke and Wills expedition

Robert O'Hara Burke (6 May 1821 – c. 28 June 1861) was an Irish soldier and police officer who achieved fame as an Australian explorer. He was the leader of the ill-fated Burke and Wills expedition, which was the first expedition to cross Australia from south to north, finding a route across the continent from the settled areas of Victoria to the Gulf of Carpentaria. The expedition party was well equipped, but Burke was not experienced in bushcraft. A Commission of Inquiry held by the Government of Victoria to investigate the failure of the expedition was a censure of Burke's judgement.

== Early years ==
Burke was born in St Clerans, near the village of Craughwell, County Galway, Ireland in May 1821. He was the second of three sons of James Hardiman Burke (1788 – January 1854), an officer in the British army 7th Royal Fusiliers, and Anne Louisa Burke née O'Hara (married 1817, d.1844).

Robert O'Hara was one of seven children:

- John Hardiman Burke (d. August 1863)
- Robert O'Hara Burke (6 May 1821 – 28 June 1861)
- James Thomas Burke (c. 1828 – 7 July 1854)
- Fanny Marie Burke (married John Blakeney)
- Elizabeth Burke (married Lt. Col Menzies)
- Hester Albinia Burke (unmarried, d. 10 November 1866)
- Anne Celestine Burke (married Major Horace de Vere, d.1914)

James Thomas Burke was a Lieutenant in the Royal Engineers, and on 7 July 1854 at the battle of Giurgevo became the first British officer killed in the Crimean War.

== Military career ==
Burke entered the Royal Military Academy, Woolwich in May 1835. In December 1836 he failed his probationary exam and went to Belgium to further his education. In 1841, at the age of twenty he entered the Austrian army and in August 1842 was promoted to Second Lieutenant in the Prince Regent's 7th Reuss Regiment of the Hungarian Hussars. He spent most of his time in the Imperial Austrian Army posted to northern Italy and in April 1847 was promoted to 1st Lieutenant. Towards the end of 1847 he suffered health problems and went to Recoaro spa in northern Italy, then Gräfenberg (now Lázně Jeseník) and finally Aachen before resigning from the Austrian army in June 1848 after charges against him relating to debts and absence without leave were dropped.

== Police career ==
After returning to Ireland in 1848, he joined the Irish Constabulary (later the Royal Irish Constabulary). He did his cadet training at Phoenix Park Depot in Dublin between November 1849 and January 1850, was promoted to 3rd Class Sub-Inspector and was stationed in County Kildare. At the end of 1850, he transferred to the Mounted Police in Dublin.

== Migrating to Australia ==
Burke migrated to Australia in 1853. He left Queenstown, County Cork on 24 November 1852 on the S.S. Rodney which was carrying 342 convicts. He arrived in Hobart, Tasmania on 12 February 1853 and promptly sailed for Melbourne. On 1 April 1853, he joined the recently established Victoria police force. Initially, he worked as Acting Inspector under the Chief Commissioner William Henry Fancourt Mitchell in the Parish of Jika Jika in the northern suburbs of Melbourne, but on 1 November 1853 he was appointed a magistrate, was promoted to Police Inspector, and was posted to Carlsruhe. On 31 December 1853, he was promoted to District Inspector of the Ovens District and early in 1854 he moved to Beechworth to relieve Inspector John Giles Price.

After the death of his brother, James Thomas, in the Crimean War, Burke decided to enlist. He left Australia on the S.S. Marco Polo on 25 March 1856 for England, but, by the time he arrived in Liverpool in June, peace had been declared and the war ended. Burke re-boarded the Marco Polo and returned to Victoria, arriving in Melbourne on 2 December 1856.

He resumed his posting at Beechworth and from there attended the "Buckland Valley" riots near Bright against the Chinese gold miners in 1857. In November 1858 he was transferred to Castlemaine as Police Superintendent on £550 p.a. plus a groom and quarters at Broadoaks on Gingell Street.

After the South Australian explorer, John McDouall Stuart had reached the centre of Australia, the South Australian parliament offered a reward of £2,000 for the promotion of an expedition to cross the continent from the south to north, generally following Stuart's route. He also partnered with another explorer who wanted to discover things about Australia.

== Burke and Wills Expedition ==
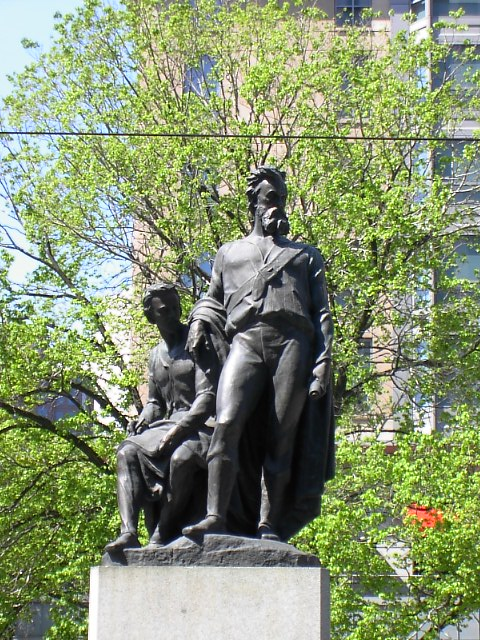
Burke and Wills Statue on the corner of Collins and Swanston Street, Melbourne

In June 1860, Burke was appointed to lead the Victorian Exploring Expedition with William John Wills, his third-in-command, as surveyor and astronomical observer.

The expedition left Melbourne on Monday, 20 August 1860 with a total of 19 men, 27 camels and 23 horses. They reached Menindee on 23 September 1860 where several people resigned, including the second-in-command, George James Landells and the medical officer, Dr. Hermann Beckler.

Cooper Creek, 400 miles further on, was reached on 11 November 1860 by the advance group, the remainder being intended to catch up. After a break, Burke decided to make a dash to the Gulf of Carpentaria, leaving on 16 December 1860. William Brahe was left in charge of the remaining party. The small team of Burke, William Wills, John King and Charley Gray reached the mangroves on the estuary of the Flinders River, near where the town of Normanton now stands, on 9 February 1861. Flooding rains and swamps meant they never saw the open ocean.

Already weakened by starvation and exposure, their progress on the return journey was slow and hampered by the tropical monsoon downpours of the wet season. Gray died four days before they reached the rendezvous at Cooper Creek. The other three rested for a day when they buried him. They eventually reached the rendezvous point on 21 April 1861, 9 hours after the rest of the party had given up waiting and left, leaving a note and some food, as they had not been relieved by the party supposed to be returning from Menindee.

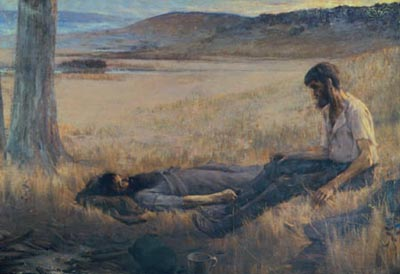
Artur Loureiro, Death of Burke, 1892, private collection

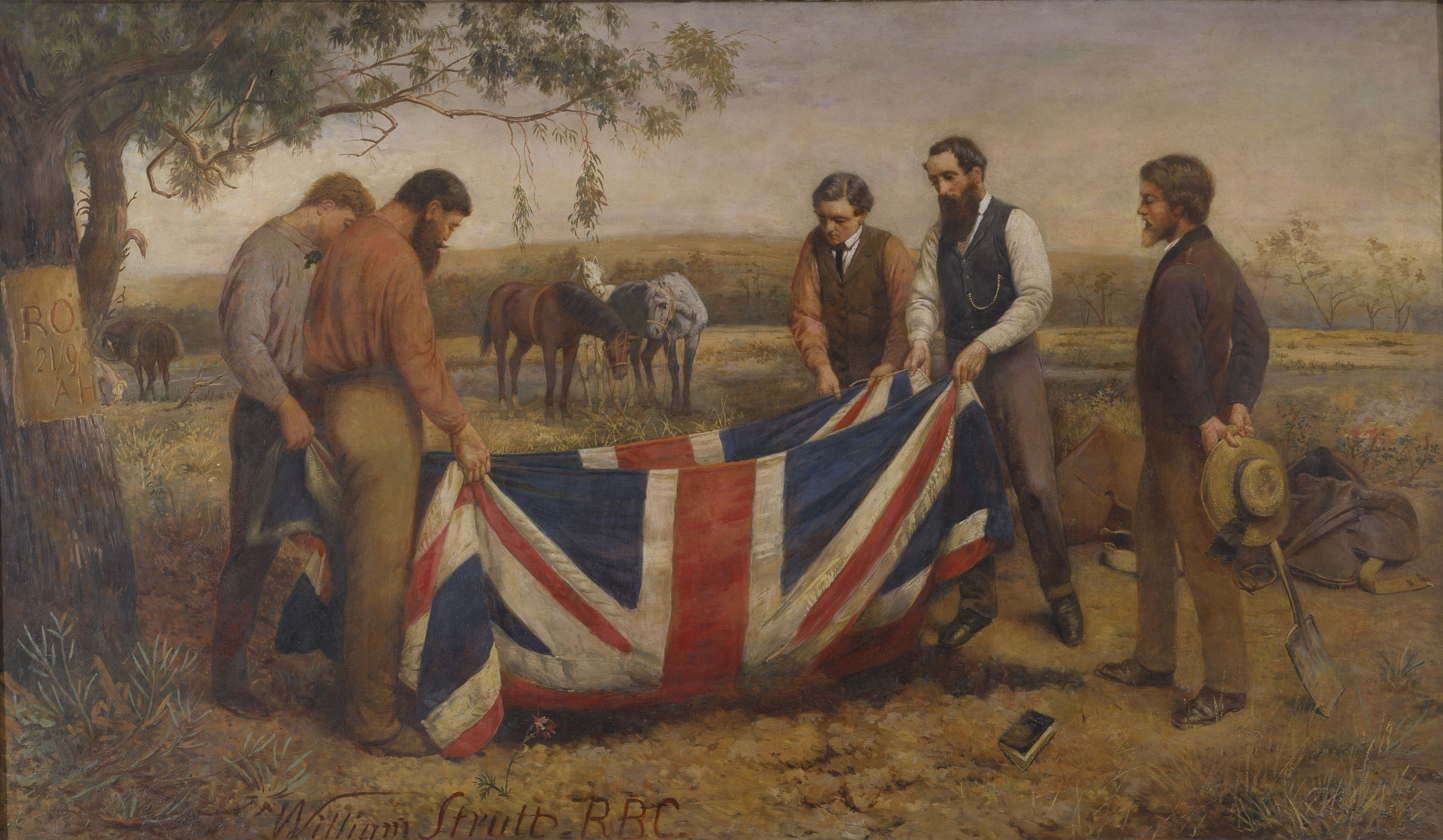
William Strutt, Burial of Burke, 1911, State Library of Victoria

They attempted to reach Mount Hopeless, the furthest outpost of pastoral settlement in South Australia, which was closer than Menindee, but failed and returned to Cooper Creek. While waiting for rescue Wills died of exhaustion and starvation. Soon after, Burke also died, at a place now called Burke's Waterhole on Cooper Creek in South Australia. The exact date of Burke's death is uncertain but has generally been accepted to be 28 June 1861.

King survived with the help of Aboriginal Australians until he was rescued in September by Alfred William Howitt. Howitt buried Burke and Wills before returning to Melbourne. In 1862 Howitt returned to Cooper Creek and disinterred Burke and Wills' bodies, taking them first to Adelaide and then by steamer to Melbourne where they were laid in state for two weeks. On 21 January 1863, Burke and Wills received a state funeral and were buried in Melbourne General Cemetery. On that day, Stuart and his companions were received at a large ceremony in Adelaide, having successfully completed the south–north crossing and arriving back in Adelaide on 17 December 1862.

== Places named after Burke ==
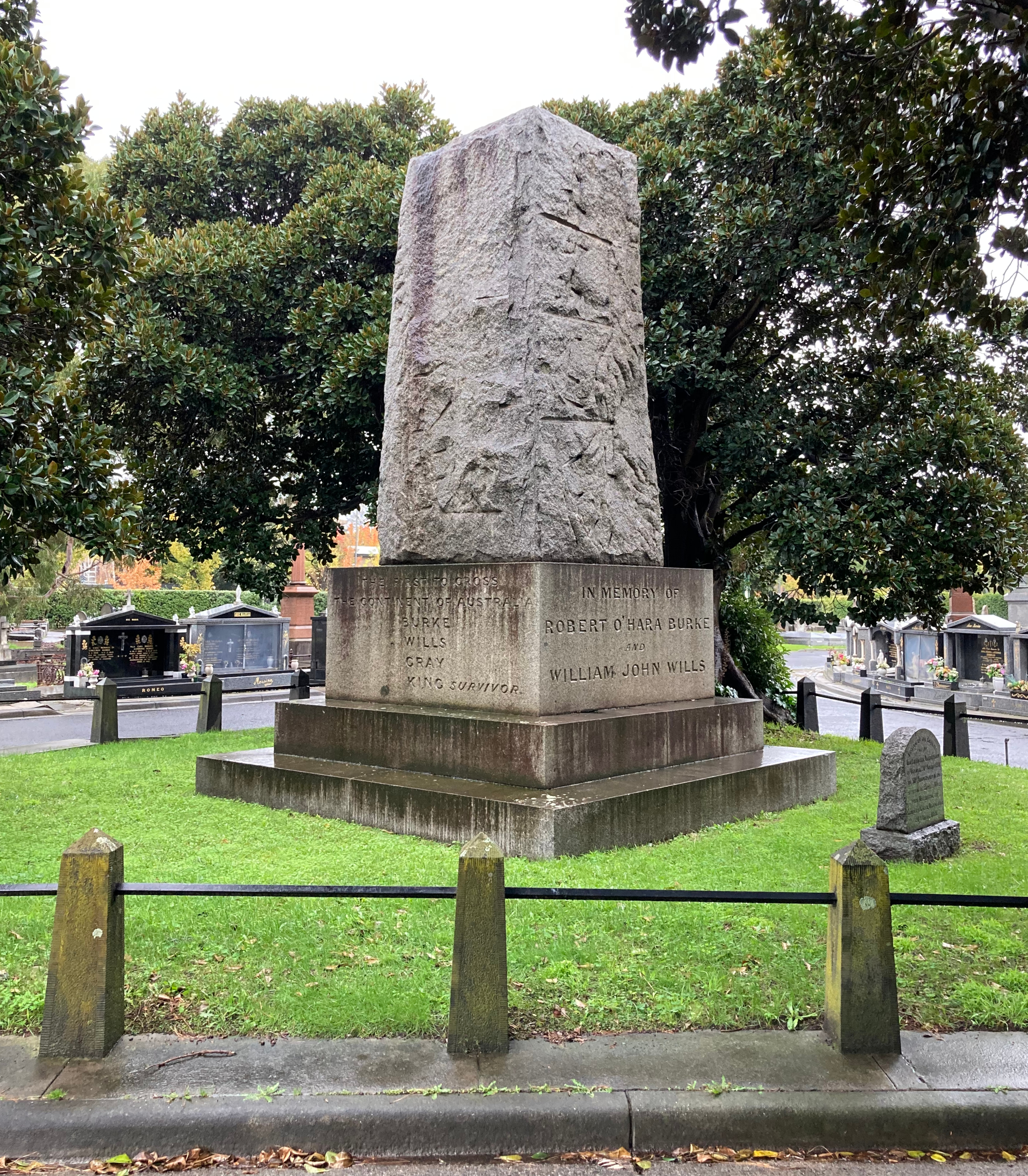
Graves of Burke and Wills at Melbourne General Cemetery

- Burketown, Queensland
- Burke River in western Queensland.
- O'Haras Gap, Selwyn Ranges, Queensland

== Places named by Burke ==
- Cloncurry River was named by Burke after Lady Cloncurry. She was his cousin, Elizabeth Kirwan, who had married Lord Cloncurry. Lady Cloncurry was the daughter of Burke's paternal Aunt Penelope and her husband John Kirwan.

== See also ==
- John King (explorer)
- List of people on the postage stamps of Ireland
- William John Wills
