= John King (explorer) =

Irish soldier & Australian explorer (1838-1872)

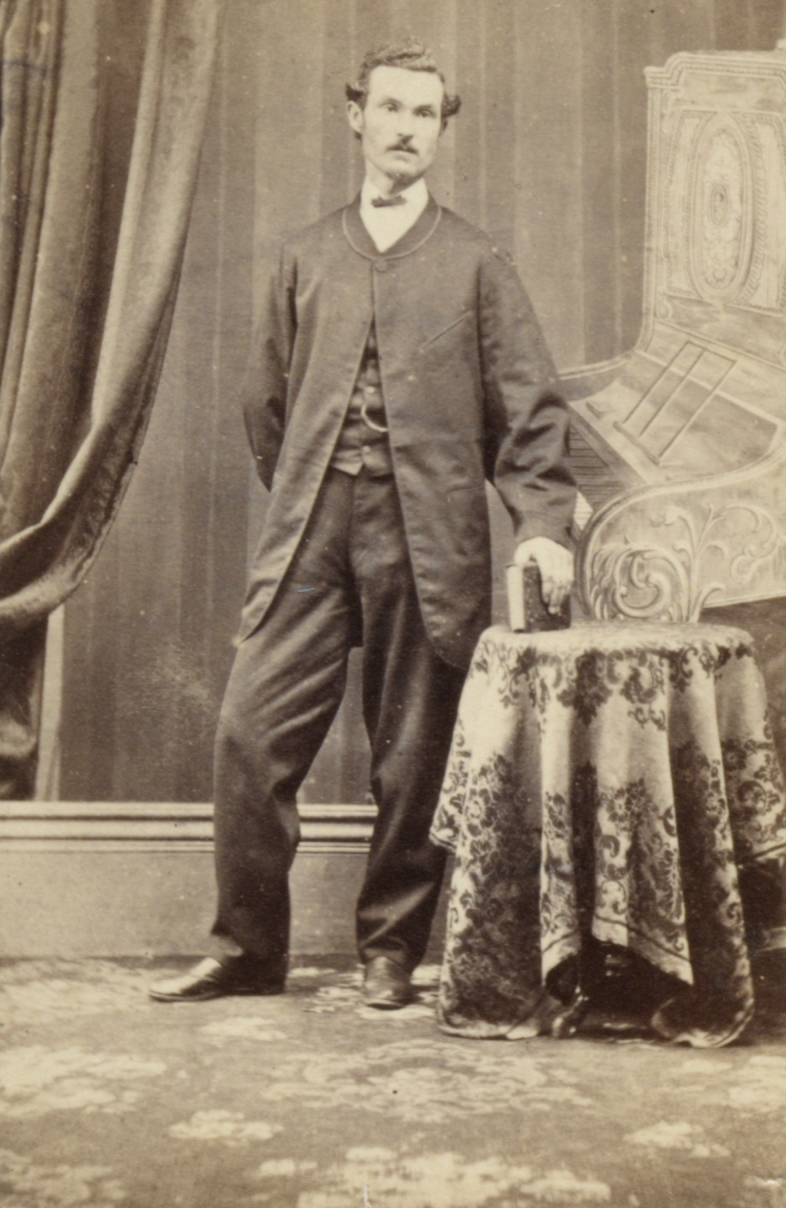
- John King, circa 1861
- Born: 5 December 1838; Moy, County Tyrone, Ireland
- Died: 15 January 1872 (aged 33); St Kilda, Victoria, Australia
- Burial place: Melbourne General Cemetery
- Education: Royal Hibernian Military School
- Occupations: Soldier, camel handler, explorer
- Known for: Survivor of the Burke and Wills expedition and first European to cross Australia from north to south

John King (15 December 1838 – 15 January 1872) was an Irish-born British soldier who achieved fame as an Australian explorer. He was the sole survivor of the four men from the ill-fated Burke and Wills expedition who reached the Gulf of Carpentaria. The expedition was the first European crossing of Australia from south to north, finding a route across the continent from Melbourne in Victoria to the Gulf of Carpentaria in Queensland.

== Early years ==
King was born at Moy in County Tyrone, Ireland on 15 December 1838 to Henry King (d. 1839) and Ellen Orn (d. September 1847). He was the youngest of six known siblings:

- Thomas King (b.1823)
- William King (b. 1830)
- Elizabeth King (b. 1833) Migrated to Australia in 1858.
- Jane (b.1835)
- Samuel King (b. 1831)
- John King (5 December 1838 – 15 January 1872).

King was educated at the Royal Hibernian Military School at Phoenix Park in Dublin between 1847 and 1853, before joining the 70th Regiment on 15 January 1853 at the age of 14. King was sent to Chatham and then posted to India, where the Regiment had been stationed since 1848.

== India ==
King arrived in India on either 28 September or 29 October 1853. The regiment, under Colonel Galway and then Colonel Chute, was stationed in Cawnpore in the Northern Province. King worked as an assistant teacher in the Regimental School. He was later stationed in Peshawar in the North West Frontier Province where he was involved in some of the principal engagements during the Indian Mutiny. He suffered a severe illness and spent sixteen months convalescing in the Rawalpindi District, probably at Murree.

While convalescing he met George James Landells at Muridke. Landells had been sent to India by the Victorian Government to purchase 24 camels to be used for exploration of the Australian desert. King obtained his army discharge in Rawalpindi in January 1860 and then travelled to Karachi where he was engaged by Landells to supervise the sepoys who had charge of the camels. Landells, King, two other Europeans, eight Indian sepoys and 24 camels sailed for Melbourne aboard the S.S. Chinsurah on 30 March 1860.

== Australia ==
King arrived in Melbourne on 8 June 1860. The camels were offloaded a week later and accommodated at the Victorian Parliament House stables in Spring Street. They were later moved to newly constructed stables at Royal Park whence the Expedition had left.

== Burke and Wills expedition ==
Robert O'Hara Burke was appointed leader of the Victorian Exploring Expedition with Landells as second-in-command. William John Wills was surveyor and astronomical observer and King was appointed as one of the Expedition Assistants, on a salary of £120 a year.

The expedition left Melbourne on Monday, 20 August 1860 with a total of 19 men, 27 camels and 23 horses. They reached Menindee on 16 October 1860, at which point Landells resigned following an argument with Burke. Wills was promoted to second-in-command and King was placed in charge of the camels.

Burke split the expedition at Menindee and the lead party reached Cooper Creek on 11 November 1860 where they formed a depot. The remaining men were expected to follow up from Menindee and so, after a break, Burke decided to make a dash to the Gulf of Carpentaria. Burke split the party again and left on 16 December 1860, placing William Brahe in charge of the depot on Cooper Creek. On 9 February 1861, Burke, Wills, King and Charley Gray reached the mangroves on the estuary of the Flinders River, near where the town of Normanton now stands. Flooding rains and swamps meant they never saw open ocean.

Already weakened by starvation and exposure, their progress on the return journey was slow and hampered by the tropical monsoon downpours of the wet season. Gray died four days before they reached the depot at Cooper Creek and the other three took a day to bury him. They eventually reached the depot on Sunday, 21 April 1861, only to find the men had not arrived from Menindee and Brahe and the Depot Party had given up waiting and left just nine hours earlier. Brahe had buried a note and some food underneath a coolabah tree, which was emblazoned with the words "DIG 3 FT NW", now known as the Dig Tree.

Burke, Wills and King attempted to reach Mount Hopeless, the furthest extent of settlement in South Australia, which was closer than Menindee, but failed and returned to Cooper Creek. While waiting for rescue, Burke and Wills died of exhaustion and starvation. The exact date of their deaths is uncertain, but has generally been accepted to be 28 June 1861.

King survived with the help of the Yandruwandha people, with whom he lived for two and a half months. During that time, King had a child with a Yandruwandha woman, Carrawaw, and their descendants still live in the area. He was rescued in September by Alfred William Howitt. Howitt buried Burke and Wills before returning to Melbourne.

== After the expedition ==
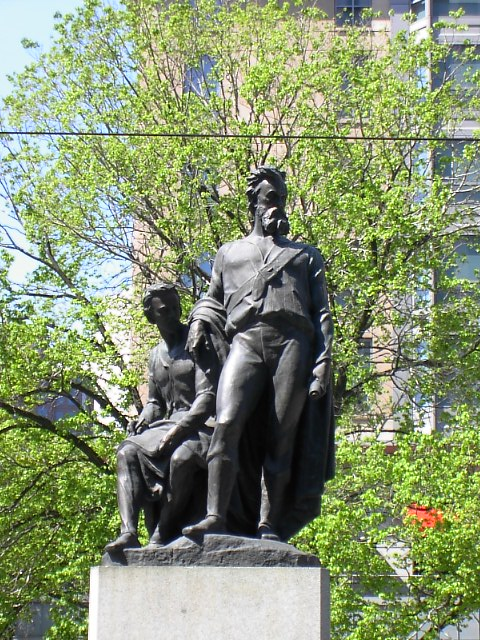
Burke and Wills Statue on the corner of Collins and Swanston Streets, Melbourne

When Howitt got to Menindee he sent King on ahead to Melbourne, escorted by Edwin Welch and Weston Phillips. King arrived back in Melbourne on 29 November 1861 where he was hailed as a hero and mobbed by the admiring colonists of Victoria. King received a gold watch and a pension of £180 a year from the Royal Society of Victoria. King was a deeply reluctant celebrity: still physically and emotionally fragile, he struggled to deal with the frenzied public interest in him.

King was cared for by his sister, Elizabeth, at her house in Westbury Street, St Kilda. In 1863 he went to Tasmania to see if it would aid his recovery, arriving in Hobart on the SS Black Swan on Sunday, 1 February. King returned to Melbourne and was present at the inauguration of the Burke & Wills statue on the corner of Collins and Russell Streets in Melbourne on 21 April 1865, the fourth anniversary of their return to Cooper Creek.

In 1865 he bought a house in Octavia Street, St Kilda, and on 22 August 1871 he married his cousin, Mary Richmond, at the Wesley Church on Lonsdale Street. King never fully recovered from the privations suffered while on the expedition, and in 1869 his health began to deteriorate. During November and December 1871 he was so ill he was cared for at his sister's house in Drummond Street, Carlton. He returned home to St Kilda and died prematurely of pulmonary tuberculosis on 15 January 1872 aged 33. His pall-bearers were Ferdinand von Mueller, Dr David Wilkie and Inspector James M Gilmour. He is buried in the Melbourne General Cemetery.

He was not related to his contemporary, surveyor and explorer Stephen King, a participant in John McDouall Stuart's successful 1861–1862 expedition.
