= Mitaka people =

Aboriginal Australian people

The Mitaka (alternatively Mithaka) are an indigenous Australian people of the state of Queensland.

== Country ==
In Norman Tindale's calculations, the Mitaka, a Channel Country people around Lake Machattie, are assigned a tribal domain of some 4,800 square miles (12,000 km^{2}) from Durrie in the south northwards as far as Glengyle. Their eastern limits ran close to Monkira, while the western frontier was at Kalidawarry.

In 2015, the Federal Court of Australia awarded native title to the Mithaka traditional owners, involving an area of over 55,425 square kilometres in south-west Queensland.

in 2025, the Mithaka Cultural Landscape, spanning 33,000 sq km, was added to the National Heritage List. The area includes one of the oldest quarries in the world made by a non-agricultural society, as well as the two oldest intact houses in Australia.

== Alternative names ==
- Mithaka
- Mittaka
- Mittuka
- Marunga
- Mit:aka (putatively a Dieri exonym)
- Marrala/ Marranda (language names)
- Murunuta
- Midaga

== Sources ==
- Fraser, A. (31 May 1897). "Mulligan River dialect". Australasian Anthropological Society. 1 (6): 123.
- Fraser, A. (21 November 1899). "Moon myth". Science of Man. 2 (10): 194.
- Fraser, A. (21 February 1901a). "Jupiter: an aboriginal star myth". Science of Man. 4 (1): 8–9.
- Fraser, A. (21 August 1901b). "How the aborigines about Kalliduwarry make rain". Science of Man. 4 (7): 116–117.
- Fraser, A. (22 November 1901c). "Meilaroo—place of perpetual darkness". Science of Man. 4 (10): 167.
- Fraser, A. (23 May 1902). "Kornkee doctor: Mulligan River". Science of Man. 5 (4): 68.
- Tindale, Norman Barnett (1974). "Mitaka (QLD)". Aboriginal Tribes of Australia: Their Terrain, Environmental Controls, Distribution, Limits, and Proper Names. Australian National University Press.
