= William John Wills =

British explorer (1834–c. 1861)

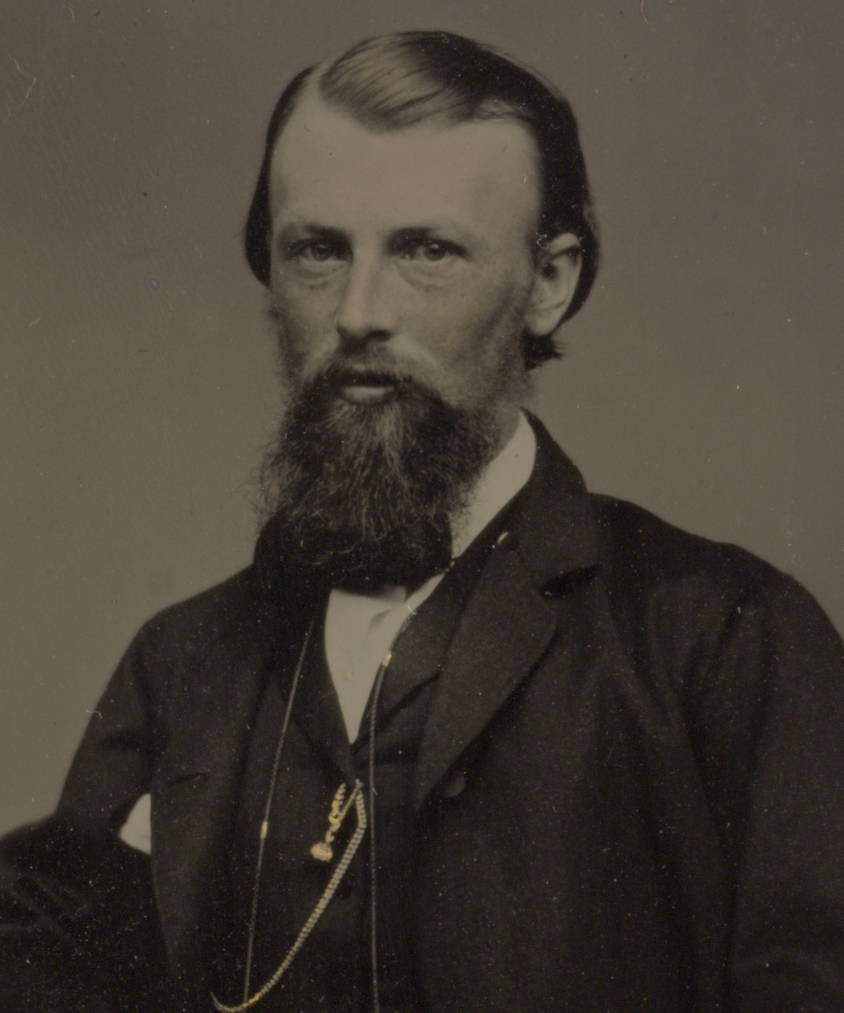
- Born: 5 January 1834; Totnes, Devon, England, UK
- Died: 28 June 1861 (aged 27); Cooper Creek, South Australia, Australia
- Occupations: Surveyor, explorer
- Years active: 1852−1861
- Known for: Burke and Wills expedition

William John Wills (5 January 1834 – c. 28 June 1861) was a British surveyor who also trained as a surgeon. He was the second-in-command of the Burke and Wills expedition, which was the first expedition to cross Australia from south to north, finding a route across the continent from the settled areas of Victoria to the Gulf of Carpentaria. He and the expedition leader Robert O'Hara Burke both died of exhaustion on the expedition's return journey.

== Early years ==
William John Wills was born on 5 January 1834 in Totnes, Devon, England, and he was the second of seven children born to William Wills (died 28 September 1889) and Sarah Mary Elizabeth Wills (née Calley, born 23 December 1800, baptized 12 March 1801 in Totnes, and died 19 February 1880).

Wills lived at the family home at Ipplepen in Devon, and as a young child he contracted a fever which left him with "slow and hesitating speech". He was home-tutored by his father until the age of 11, and from 1845 to 1850 attended St Andrew's Grammar School in Ashburton. He was then articled to his father's surgical practice, and he later studied practical chemistry under John Stenhouse at St Bartholomew's Hospital in London in 1852.

Wills was first cousin of Henry Thomas Dundas Le Vesconte, an English Royal Navy officer and polar explorer who died on the Franklin Expedition in 1845.

== Australia ==
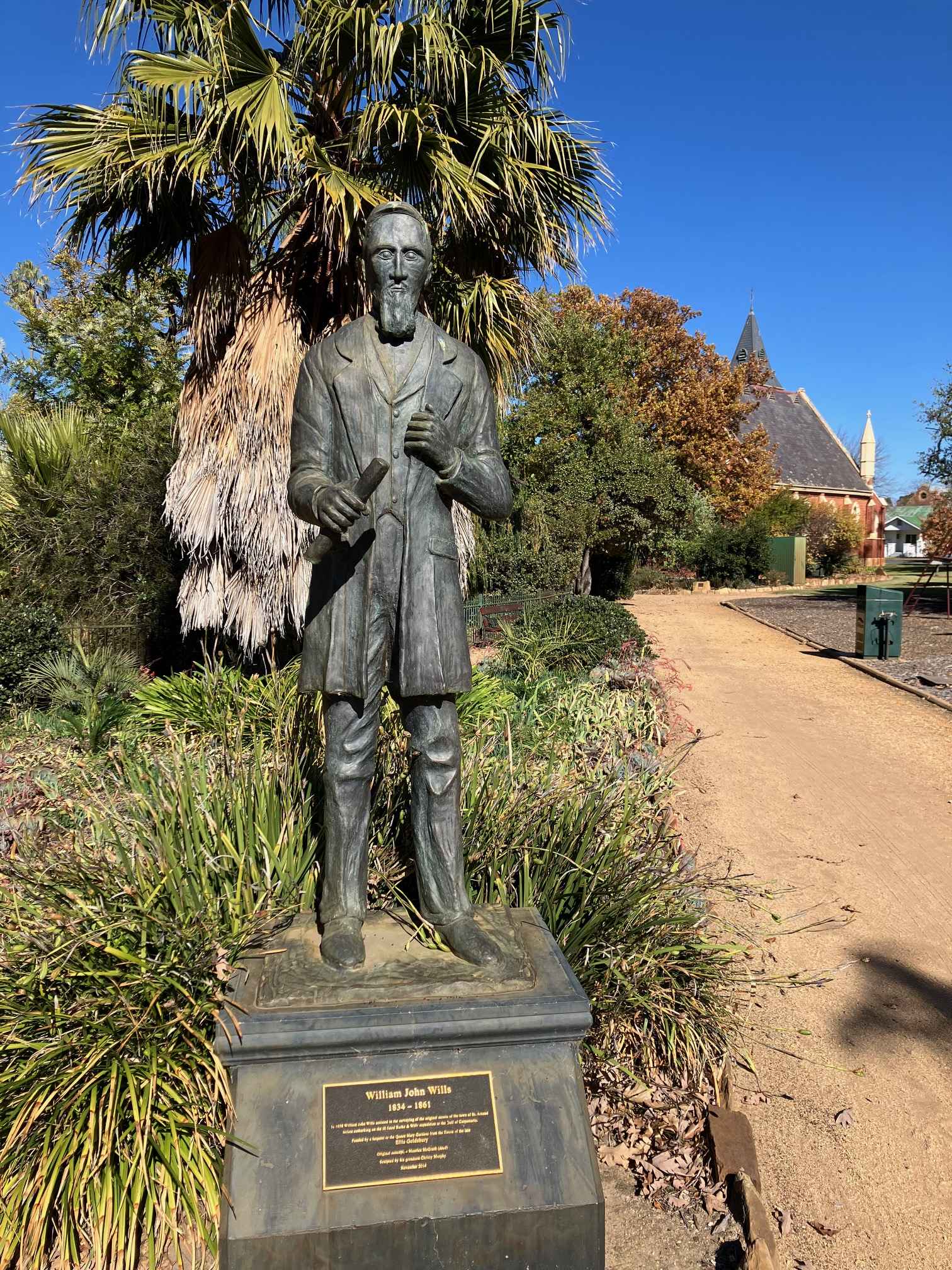
Statue of William John Wills in Botanic Gardens, St Arnaud in Victoria. In 1858 Wills assisted in surveying the original streets of St Arnaud.

Wills bought a share in the Melbourne Gold Mining Company in 1852 and planned to migrate to Australia with his wife Sarah and sons William and Thomas. However, as his wife objected to him leaving London, Wills delayed his departure and consequently the two boys went to Australia alone. Eighteen-year-old William and fifteen-year-old Thomas departed from Dartmouth on 1 October 1852 aboard the Janet Mitchell, and they arrived in Melbourne on 3 January 1853 with 197 other passengers. William and Thomas found accommodation at the Immigrants Home in South Melbourne.

In February 1853, the Wills brothers found work as shepherds at a property owned by the Royal Bank Company on the Edward River near Deniliquin. They were paid £30 per year (£3296 in 2025) plus rations, and were in charge of a flock of 1300 rams at the Ram Station. In the same year, their father followed his sons to Australia, arriving in August 1853, and the three returned to Melbourne before moving to Ballarat where William John Wills worked as a digger in the goldfields. In 1854, he worked as an assistant surgeon in his father's practice and later he opened his own gold office.

In early 1855, William worked on William Skene's Kanawalla Station on the Wannon River near Hamilton. He returned to Ballarat in April 1855, and towards the end of the year he began to study surveying. He was appointed as an amateur to John Hamlet Taylor, the Acting District Surveyor of the Ballarat Survey Office on Sturt Street. William spent several months learning trigonometry, Euclidean geometry and in 1856 studied field surveying. He began his practical surveying experience at Glendaruel, near Tourello. There, he worked under the supervision of Frederick John Byerly, Assistant Surveyor, on £150 per year (£13967 in 2025) plus board. In February 1857, he worked at Bullarook Creek Camp, and in March 1857 he surveyed at Kingower near Inglewood. In the middle of 1857, he was promoted to foreman and placed in charge of a field party; his salary also increased to £185 per year (£18087 in 2025). From April to June 1858, he surveyed at St Arnaud, then in July he returned to Ballarat and took occasional contracts surveying for Clement Hodgkinson, the Deputy Surveyor General.

Wills moved to Melbourne in August 1858, and from August to December, he lodged with Mrs E Henderson at 1 Dorcas Street, South Melbourne. In November 1858, he received a temporary appointment on the recommendation of Charles Whybrow Ligar, Surveyor General, as a supernumerary at the recently established Magnetic Observatory which was then located at Flagstaff Hill. In February 1859, one of the observatory assistants, John Walter Osborne, transferred from the observatory to become a photozincographer in the Survey Department of the Office of Crown Lands and Survey. Wills replaced Osborne at the observatory, then his permanent appointment was confirmed in March 1859, at which point he moved into a room at the Observatory. Wills studied under Government Meteorologist and Observatory Director Georg von Neumayer, and he worked with Jacob Bauer, Charles E Pickering, Charles Moerlin, and supernumeraries John Osborne and Edwin James Welch.

== Burke and Wills expedition ==
Wills was appointed third-in-command, surveyor, and astronomical and meteorological observer of the Victorian Exploring expedition in July 1860 on a salary of £300 a year (£31538 in 2025). Robert O'Hara Burke was the leader, George James Landells served as second-in-command. The expedition left Melbourne on Monday, 20 August 1860 with a total of 19 men, 27 camels, and 23 horses, and they reached Menindee on 16 October 1860, where Landells resigned following an argument with Burke. As a result, Wills was promoted to second-in-command.

Burke then split the expedition at Menindee. The lead party reached Cooper Creek on 11 November 1860 where they formed a depot, and the remaining men were expected to follow up from Menindee. After a break, Burke decided to make a dash to the Gulf of Carpentaria. Burke split the party again and left on 16 December 1860, placing William Brahe in charge of the depot on Cooper Creek. Burke, Wills, John King and Charley Gray reached the mangroves on the estuary of the Flinders River, near the current town Normanton, Queensland, on 9 February 1861, though flooding rains and swamps meant they never saw open ocean.

Already weakened by starvation and exposure, progress on the return journey was slow, and the group was hampered by the tropical monsoon downpours typical to the wet season. Gray died four days before Burke, Wills, and King reached the depot at Cooper Creek. They arrived on 21 April 1861 to find that the men had not arrived from Menindee, and that Brahe and the Depot Party had given up waiting and left just nine hours earlier. Brahe had already waited 18 weeks for their return (he and Burke had agreed to 13 weeks) and had buried a note and some food underneath a tree which is now known as the Dig Tree.

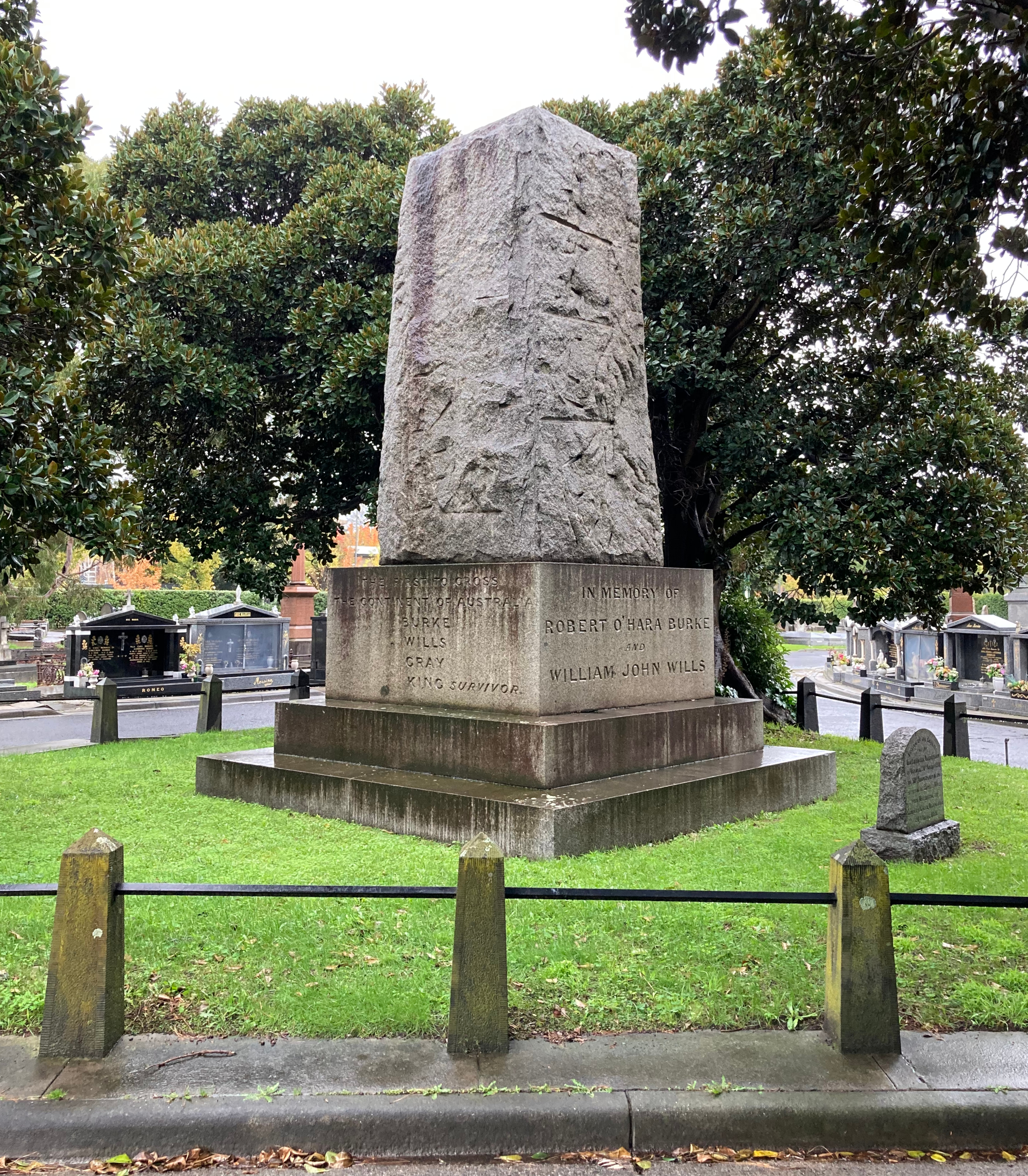
Graves of Burke and Wills at Melbourne General Cemetery

Burke, Wills and King attempted to reach Mount Hopeless, the furthest extent of settlement in South Australia, which was closer than Menindee (the route preferred by Wills), but failed, and returned to Cooper Creek. Wills became exhausted and was unable to continue while waiting to be rescued. Wills urged Burke and King to continue on, so they left him alone with food, water and shelter. He died alone at the age of 27 at Breerily Waterhole on Cooper Creek in South Australia, and Burke died soon after. While the exact date of their deaths is unknown, it is generally accepted to be 28 June 1861.

King survived with the help of a group of Aborigines until being rescued in September by Alfred William Howitt, who buried Burke and Wills before returning to Melbourne. In 1862, Howitt returned to Cooper Creek and disinterred Burke and Wills' bodies, taking them first to Adelaide and then by steamer to Melbourne where they were laid in state for two weeks. On 23 January 1863 Burke and Wills received a state funeral and were buried in Melbourne General Cemetery.

== Bibliography ==
- The Argus (Melbourne), 1861. "The Burke and Wills exploring expedition: An account of the crossing the continent of Australia from Cooper Creek to Carpentaria, with biographical sketches of Robert O'Hara Burke and William John Wills". Melbourne: Wilson and Mackinnon.
- Bonyhady, Tim, 1991. Burke and Wills: From Melbourne to myth. Balmain: David Ell Press. ISBN 0-908197-91-8.
- Burke and Wills Outback Conference 2003, 2005. The Inaugural Burke & Wills Outback Conference : Cloncurry 2003 : a collation of presentations. Dave Phoenix, Cairns Qld. ISBN 0-646-44702-5
- Clune, Frank, 1937. Dig: A drama of central Australia. Sydney: Angus and Robertson.
- Corke, David G, 1996. The Burke and Wills Expedition: A study in evidence. Melbourne: Educational Media International. ISBN 0-909178-16-X
- Murgatroyd, Sarah, 2002. The Dig Tree. Melbourne: Text Publishing. ISBN 1-877008-08-7
- Van der Kiste, John, 2011. William John Wills: Pioneer of the Australian outback. Stroud: History Press.
- Victoria: Parliament, 1862. Burke and Wills Commission. Report of the Commissioners appointed to enquire into and report upon the circumstances connected with the sufferings and death of Robert O'Hara Burke and William John Wills, the Victorian Explorers. Melbourne: John Ferres Government Printer.
- Wills, William John, & Wills, Dr William, 1863. A successful exploration through the interior of Australia, from Melbourne to the Gulf of Carpentaria: from the journals and letters of William John Wills. London: Richard Bentley.
