= Cooper Creek =

River in Queensland, South Australia

Cooper Cooper's
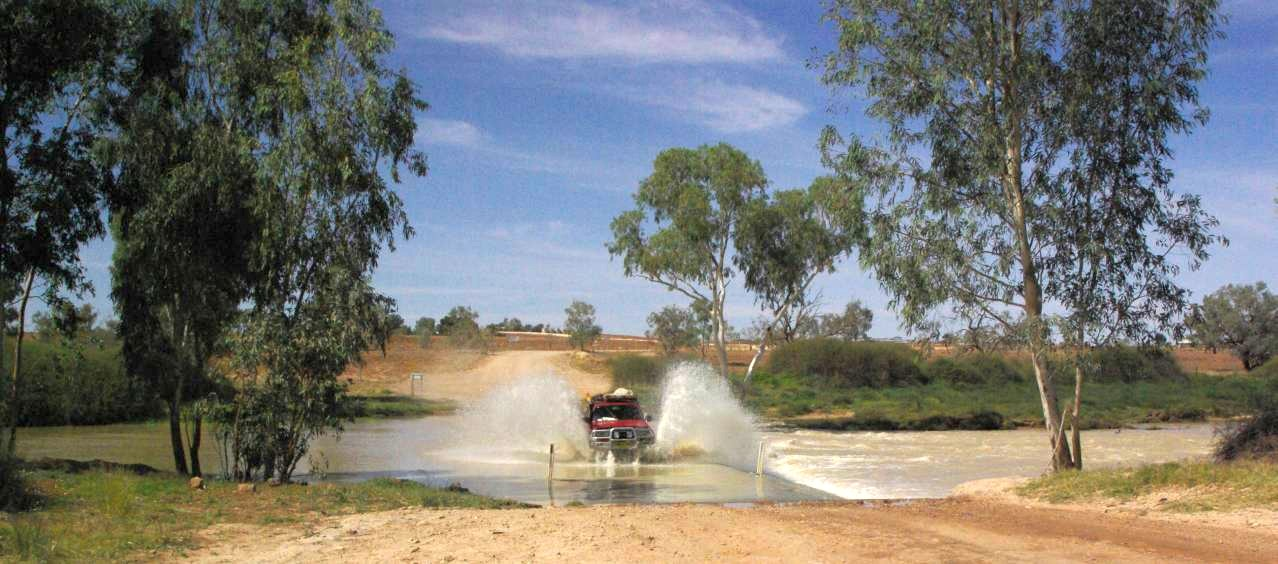
- Cooper Creek Crossing at Innamincka, South Australia, South Australia

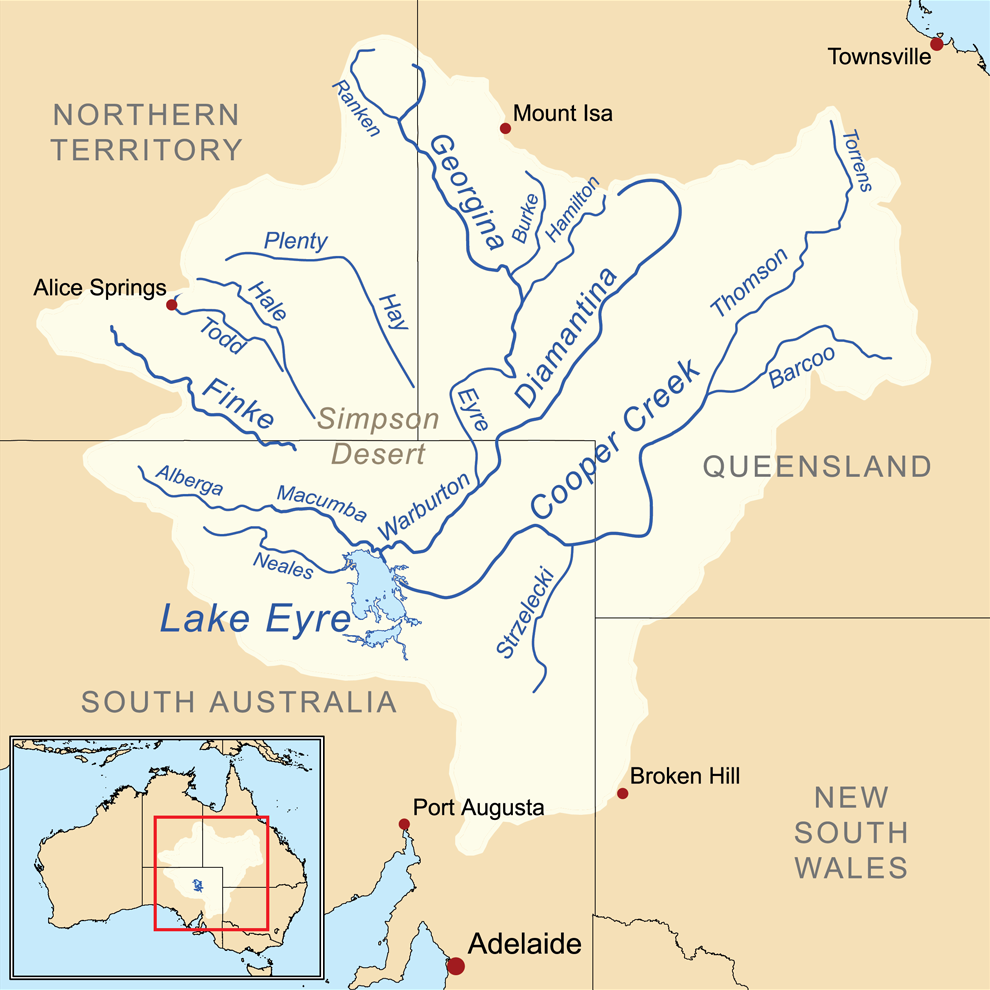
- Map of the Lake Eyre Basin showing Cooper Creek
- Etymology: Charles Cooper

Location
- Country: Australia
- State: Queensland, South Australia
- Region: Channel Country
- City: Innamincka

Physical characteristics
- Source
  - elevation: 140 m (460 ft)
- Mouth
  - location: Lake Eyre, Far North, South Australia
  - coordinates: 28°23′S 137°41′E
  - elevation: 5 m (16 ft)
- Length: 1,300 km (810 mi)

Basin features
- River system: Lake Eyre basin
- Tributaries
  - left: Thomson River, Wilson River
  - right: Barcoo River

The Cooper Creek (formerly Cooper's Creek) is a river in the Australian states of Queensland and South Australia. It was the site of the death of the explorers Burke and Wills in 1861. It is sometimes known as the Barcoo River from one of its tributaries and is one of three major Queensland river systems that flow into the Lake Eyre basin. The flow of the creek depends on monsoonal rains falling months earlier and many hundreds of kilometres away in eastern Queensland. It is 1,300 kilometres (810 mi) in length.

== History ==
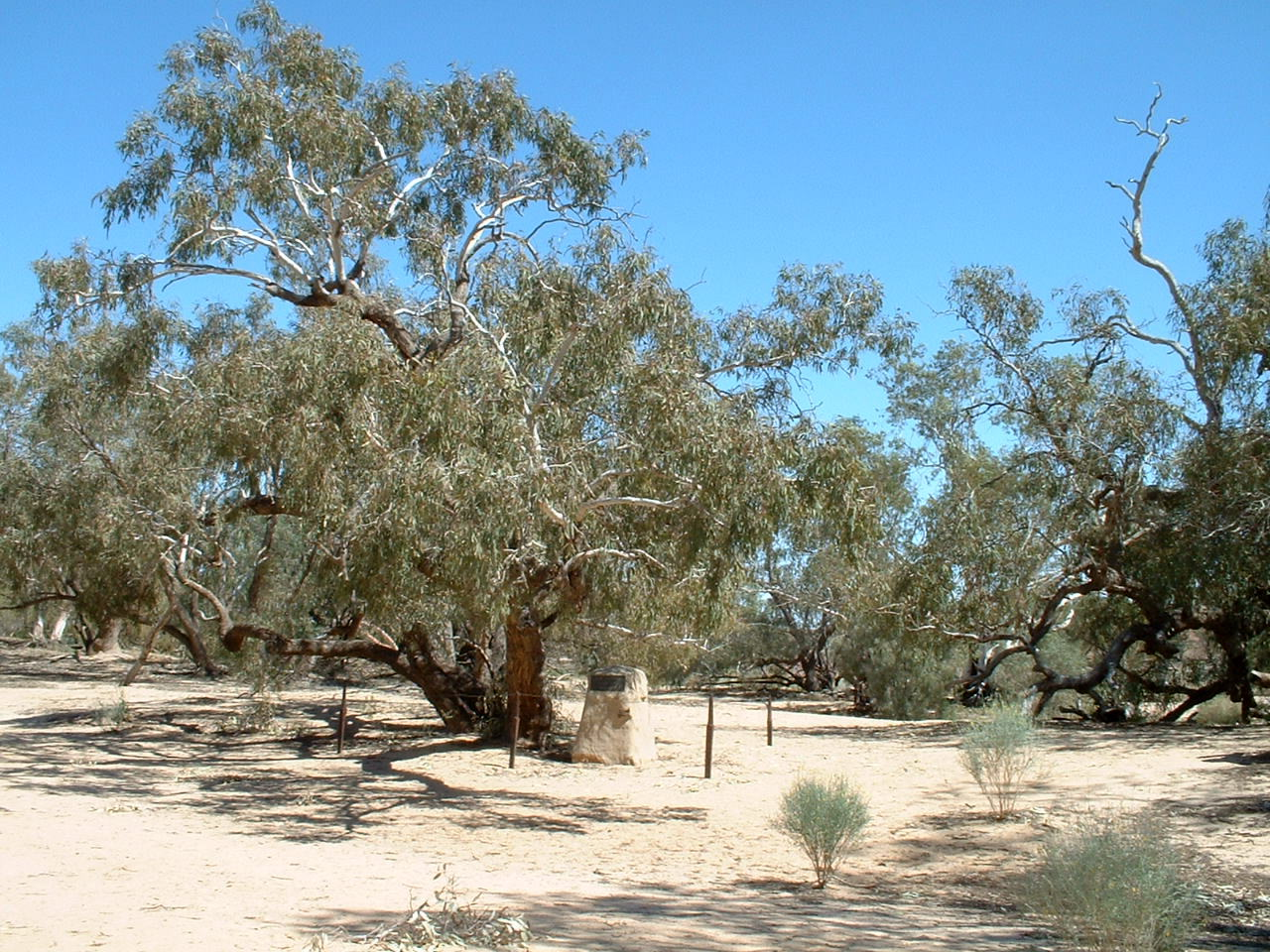
Memorial marking the site of Robert O'Hara Burke's death, at Burke Waterhole

Aboriginal Australians have inhabited the area for over 20,000 years, with over 25 tribal groups living in the Channel Country area alone. A vast trade network had been established running from north to south, with goods such as ochre sent north, while shells and pituri moved south. Birdsville was once a major meeting place for conducting ceremonies and trade.

Charles Sturt named the river in 1845 after Charles Cooper, the Chief Justice of South Australia. It was along Cooper Creek that the explorers Burke and Wills died in 1861. John King survived the expedition with the assistance of friendly Aboriginal people. Only ten years after the explorers' deaths, homesteads were being established on the watercourse. A station at Innamincka was the first permanent settlement in the area.

By 1880 the reliable water source had attracted more settlers to the point where the whole area was taken up and stocked with cattle. This led to the displacement of local people from their traditional lands. By 1900 the population had reduced to 30 survivors, just 10% of the original number, as influenza and measles took their toll.

The waterway does not experience regular seasonal floods. Being ephemeral the creek is still prone to occasional flooding, in 1940 a vast area surrounding the Cooper was underwater with the creek being measured at over 27 miles (43 km) wide in places.

== Course ==
It rises west of the Great Dividing Range on low ground as two central Queensland rivers, the Thomson between Longreach and Charters Towers, and the Barcoo in the area east of Tambo.

Cooper Creek spreads out into a vast area of anastomosing ephemeral channels, making its way roughly south into the far south-west corner of Queensland before turning due west into South Australia towards Lake Eyre. In most years, it is absorbed into the earth, goes to fill channels and the many permanent waterholes and lakes such as Lake Yamma Yamma, or simply evaporates without reaching Lake Eyre.

In very wet years, however, it manages to flood the entire Channel Country and reaches Lake Eyre after flowing through the dry areas of Strzelecki Desert, Sturt Stony Desert and the Tirari Desert. Studies have clearly shown that, although with a mean annual flow of around 2.3 cubic kilometres (0.55 cu mi) (ranging at Barcoo from an estimated 0.02 km^{3} or 16,000 acre⋅ft in 1902 to an estimated 12 km^{3} or 2.9 cu mi in 1950) the Cooper carries twice as much runoff as the Diamantina and three times as much as the Georgina, over the past ten thousand years it has reached Lake Eyre much less frequently than those rivers. This is because much more water is absorbed along its course than with the Diamantina or Georgina, but may also be because of centennial or multicentennial wet and dry cycles in those basins causing them to regularly reach the lake during wet periods (there is some evidence from terraces around Lake Eyre that this occurred during the Medieval Warm Period). During a flooding event the river upstream of Windorah may be as wide as 40 kilometres (25 mi).

== Land use ==
Most of the basin of the Cooper is used for sheep and cattle grazing on natural grasslands: although the extreme east of the basin is relatively wet with averages of over 500 mm (20 inches) at Blackall, the rainfall is much too erratic for cropping. The soils are mainly Vertisols or Vertic Torrifluvents and are quite fertile, though generally heavy in texture with a strong tendency to crack due to the erratic rainfall. Oil and gas exploration in the basin began in 1962.

== See also ==
- Cooper Creek catfish
- Cooper Floodplain below Windorah
- List of rivers of Australia
- Yapunyah waterhole
