= Bedourie Pisé House =

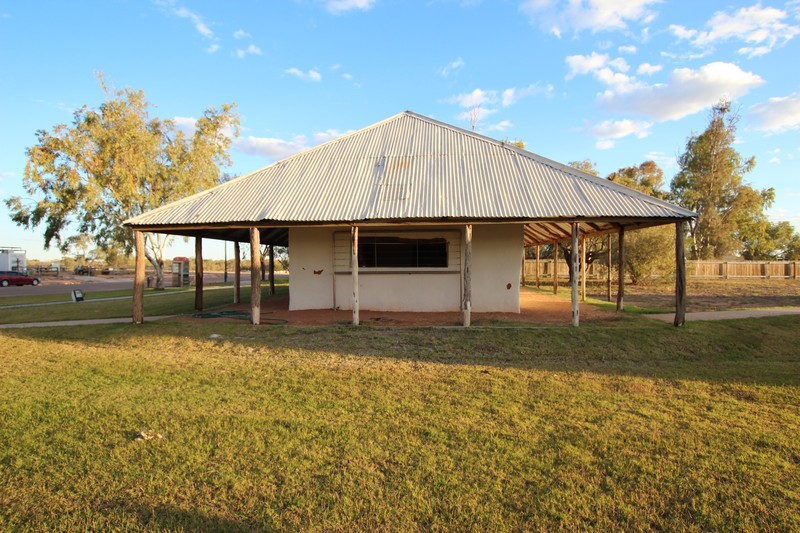
- Bedourie Pisé House, northern side opening, 2016.

- Location within Queensland
- 24.3618°S 139.4703°E
- Location: 5 Herbert Street, Bedourie, Shire of Diamantina, Queensland, Australia

History
- Design period: 1870s–1890s (Late 19th century)
- Built: 1897, 1947

Queensland Heritage Register
- Official name: Bedourie Pisé House and Aboriginal Tracker's Hut; Pisé House; Bedourie Mud Hut
- Type: state heritage
- Designated: 31 May 2019
- Reference no.: 650098
- Type: Archaeological: Archaeological potential; Law/Order, Immigration, Customs, Quarantine: Other – Law/Order, etc; Residential: Detached house
- Theme: Working: Surviving as Indigenous people in a white-dominated economy; Building settlements, towns, cities and dwellings: Dwellings; Maintaining order: Policing and maintaining law and order

Bedourie Pisé House is a heritage-listed house and archaeological site at 5 Herbert Street, Bedourie, Shire of Diamantina, Queensland, Australia. It was built in 1897. It is also known as Bedourie Pisé House, Aboriginal Tracker's Hut and Bedourie Mud Hut. It was added to the Queensland Heritage Register on 31 May 2019.

== History ==
The Bedourie Pisé House was built in 1897 as the residence of Mary Brodie, local landowner and proprietor of Bedourie's Royal Hotel. The use of pisé (rammed earth construction) was an uncommon form of building in Queensland. The building was used as a dwelling, a council meeting place and possibly a temporary hotel, but fell into disrepair before being purchased by the Diamantina Shire Council and restored in the early 21st century. Moved to stand behind the Pisé House in 2011, the Aboriginal Tracker's Hut was built at the Bedourie Police Station in 1947 as lodgings for police tracker Doctor Jack and his wife Norah. The shelter is typical of the accommodation standard built for Aboriginal trackers employed by the Queensland police in the 20th century.

The small, isolated town of Bedourie is located near Eyre Creek in the Channel Country flood plains of central western Queensland, approximately 1,130 kilometres (700 mi) west of Rockhampton and 1,182 kilometres (734 mi) north of Adelaide. The town is on the edge of the traditional lands of the Wangkamadla, Pitta Pitta, Mithaka, and Wangkangurru people. These people retained important knowledge of soaks, vital in the often dry country. Soaks or soakage or native wells) are hollows dug in freely permeable sediments, which allow water to seep through and soak in. Clean water can be dug up from the hollows. Sharing knowledge of the soaks was essential for survival and care of the land. Aboriginal people also used the major rivers, particularly the Georgina River, as water supply, travel route, and source of Dreaming stories.

The area now encompassing Bedourie was a meeting place, exchange centre and distribution area for pituri, a hallucinogenic plant containing high levels of nicotine. The country between the Georgina and Mulligan rivers was the primary source of pituri, which was used in hunting, ceremonies, and recreationally. This placed it at the centre of an important trade route, with people travelling hundreds of kilometres to the area to exchange high quality stone axes from Cloncurry and Mount Isa, medicines, and sea shells for pituri. The route was also significant for social and ritual trade, where songs, ceremonies, and knowledge were exchanged.

Following European expeditions, pastoralists occupied the Channel Country in the 1860s, stocking runs with cattle and sheep from South Australia. From 1884 Afghan cameleers, following the Aboriginal trade routes, transported goods from the newly opened Maree railway station in central South Australia, along the Channel Country rivers to Birdsville and Cloncurry. Afghan trading towns sprang up near the present sites of Birdsville and Bedourie, supporting camels transporting stores north and drovers moving stock south to the Adelaide sale yards. The Central Australia railway from Port Augusta reached Hergott Springs (later named Marree) in 1884. Construction of the line began in 1878, with Darwin the intended terminus, It reached Oodnadatta in 1891 and terminated in Alice Springs in 1929. Date palms, a regular feature of stations along the track, were planted in the townships including Bedourie to provide shade and food for the cameleers.

In 1886, a township reserve named Bedouri - reputedly meaning "dust storm" - was proclaimed on Eyre Creek. After locals advised of the flooding risk, a new site was chosen further north, on the road from the Gulf of Carpentaria to Adelaide. Situated about two days' journey from Boulia in the north and Birdsville to the south, the township was one of six small settlements which became important refreshment and supply sites for surrounding pastoral stations and drovers bound for Adelaide. The land was taken from the Nappa, Marrawilla, Pierrie, and Glenlees runs. Blackall merchants AJ Haylock and Co established a general store and hotel in the yet-to-be proclaimed and surveyed township, importing building materials to the sparsely vegetated area. The survey of the township, completed in 1888, shows the location of the hotel, its kitchen, stable and horse yards (Allotment 1 of Section 1), and the store (Allotment 2 of Section 1), but no other structures. The hotel was 61 feet by 36 feet (18.6 x 11m) and the store 30 feet by 16 feet (9 x 4.9m), both were built of cypress. The site also contained a sheep yard with 500 sheep, cellar, flour frame, 'Chinaman's garden', and a stock of wines and spirits. A further advertisement in 1889 indicated that at least £1000 would secure the property.

Bedourie developed slowly, with the hotel at its centre. A publican's licence was issued for the Bedourie hotel, named the Royal, in May 1888, but AJ Haylock and Co advertised the hotel and store for sale or let two months later. The businesses were still unsold in May 1889, when the Bedourie town sites were offered for sale in Birdsville. Eleven allotments, including the hotel, store, and future site of the Pisé house, were purchased by Mary Dolan. Born Mary Ballard c. 1858, she had been raised in hotels in Victoria by her twice-widowed mother. In 1883 she married Andrew Carey Dolan, the manager of Breadalbane Station, on the Georgina River, and the couple moved to Birdsville. Andrew Dolan died in 1887, leaving Mary with one child and an £800 estate. Rate books indicate that Andrew Dolan owned Lot 4 section 5 on which there was a wooden dwelling house. The Bedourie town land, particularly the hotel and store, enabled Mary to provide an income for herself and her daughter. Mary's acquisition of the hotel also mirrored a tradition of female publicans in Australia, particularly of widows or deserted wives. Hotel keeping was one of the few occupations women could pursue in the 19th century, allowing childcare from a home base, and granting them legal and economic independence. Mary's father, David Ballard, had managed the St Agnes Hotel in Kyneton, Victoria during the 1850s. After his death in 1858, the approximate year of Mary's birth, her mother Margaret later acquired his liquor licence and managed the hotel while raising three small children. She married Robert Hall in 1861, had four more children, was widowed 1866, with another child born after Robert's death. Margaret continued to manage the St Agnes Hotel through to 1877, when she was declared insolvent. A study of Townsville female publicans reveals that numbers of female publicans rose dramatically in the early 1900s: a handful of women were hotel-keepers in the 1890s, but by 1902, half the hotels in town were run by women.

By 1891, Mary had become the principal business operator and service provider in Bedourie. Although very few people lived in the town, her hotel served passing drovers, pastoral station occupants, and visiting racegoers who attended Bedourie's annual horse races, which began in 1887. In addition to being the hotel proprietor, Mary was the town's postmistress, storekeeper, butcher, and wine and spirit merchant. She also grazed two flocks of sheep around Bedourie, and owned the town's boat. In 1890, she married John Gray Brodie, of Cluny Station, and the hotel, butcher, store, and wine and spirit businesses were transferred to Brodie from 1892. John Brodie, however, died in January 1895, leaving Mary with a further two children and a third expected. John and Mary's son was also named John Gray Brodie and their youngest daughter Grace was born in September 1895, after John's death. She continued to run the Bedourie businesses, inheriting them along with Brodie's £500 estate.

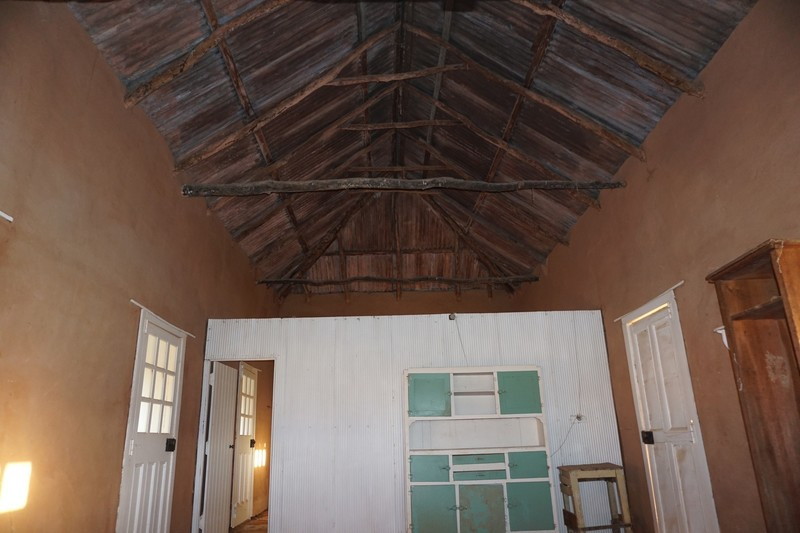
Main room of Bedourie pisé House, 2016

In 1897, the value of two of Mary's previously undeveloped sites (allotments 1 and 2 of section 5), leapt from £60 to £200. The allotments stood opposite the hotel and store on Bedourie's main street. The hotel and store were destroyed in a storm in October 1897, and the building erected on allotment 1 of section 5 - a small pisé house - may have served as a temporary hotel as well as residence, until a new hotel and store were built in 1898. The hotel and store were noted by travelling priest Father Hanley, visiting the town in late 1898. The hotel is still extant. It featured multiple external doors, and a large room with a fireplace at one end, similar to hotels in remote areas in South Australia.

The house employed an unusual construction method for Queensland, pisé de terre. Often known as pisé or mud construction, pisé de terre is an ancient building method in which loam (earth of low clay content) is rammed into temporary formwork to create rock-like walls. The compaction forces the soil particles together, requiring no additional strengthening. The method was traditionally used in Mediterranean, Central Asian countries, and parts of China, but fell out of use. It was "rediscovered" in France in the mid-18th century, reaching England about 1787, the United States of America around 1810–5 and Australia from the 1820s. It was one of several earthen building construction methods used in Australia, including structures made from mud brick, stones within a mud matrix, cob, adobe, and pisé.

While not widely used across Queensland, the method of pisé construction proved valuable in western Queensland, where building materials were difficult to come by. The limited vegetation provided insufficient material for construction, and while a sandstone quarry existed near Birdsville, allowing residents there to construct stone buildings, Bedourie, surrounded by desert sandhills and stony desert tableland soils, lacked a local stone cache. Pisé construction had several advantages, being "less than one-half the cost of Brick or Wood", "equal in appearance and strength to any stone building", and its material was "always procurable". Pisé had particular benefits in the arid climate of western Queensland: the buildings were not prone to deterioration, and were "cool in summer, warm in winter". A wide array of pisé buildings were constructed in the Channel Country, including Birdsville's first hotel; Windorah's original police station (1884); hotels in Jundah, Windorah, and Canterbury; and homestead buildings at Diamantina Lakes, Cullwilla, Daroo, Palpara, Mornay, St Albans, Toorajumpa, and Monika. St Paul's Anglican Church built in 1874 at Cleveland was also rumoured to be a pisé building, beneath a cement-rendered facade. Most of the pisé buildings did not survive, however. Two of the most renowned, the Windorah hotel and the JC hotel in Canterbury, burned down in 1954 and melted after the roof was removed, respectively.

The ease of construction was another advantage, with minimal equipment and expert knowledge needed. Information on erecting pisé buildings was easily procurable in the 1890s, with contemporary publications and newspapers providing detailed, illustrated instructions on the construction process. A pisé building could be constructed by a single person, though "a tradesman who understands the principle of the system and the materials" was recommended. Publications emphasised the strength and durability of the buildings, so long as a large projecting roof was provided to protect the walls from the weather, with verandahs on all sides also recommended.

In 1899, Mary Brodie married her third husband, James Craigie, owner of Alderley station and "uncrowned cattle king" of Boulia. Craigie, a South Australian, had initially worked at Mount Cornish Station, relocating to Roxborough Downs from 1878. He had six children with local Aboriginal woman Bunny Roxborough. Mount Cornish had also originally been a pisé building. Craigie relocated his business headquarters to Bedourie in April 1900, and Mary's property was transferred to James in 1901. Mary had purchased the hotel in June 1899 for £3000, installing her half-sister Ellen Talbot as manager, but Ellen's ill-health had forced her retirement. Mary sold the hotel in 1904. Mary briefly moved to Winton in 1902, where she owned and operated the Tattersalls Hotel, but returned to Bedourie in 1904. The current Tattersalls Hotel operated as the Club Hotel in 1899, and Tattersalls was located opposite the North Gregory. Mary sold the hotel to her future son-in-law, TJ O'Rourke, in October 1904. Tattersalls burnt down in 1925. In her absence, the Bedourie Pisé House was leased to the newly formed Diamantina Shire Council. Council meetings were held in Bedourie until March 1919, likely all in the pisé house.

The house was - and remained - one of the few buildings in Bedourie, which in December 1904 consisted of a public house, store, blacksmith's shop, a few dwellings, and a police station. A bore was added in 1905. Despite its small size, however, Bedourie's attractions drew regular visitors. A traveller in October 1910 described Bedourie as a "caravansary … an oasis in the desert" with hospitality courtesy of the Craigie family, and the town was "a favourite resort of cattlemen". The hotel issued its own currency and the large race-going crowds were managed under the watchful eye of publican "Mother Bedourie". "Mother Bedourie" was compared with the "Eulo Queen" Isabel Gray, also a thrice married publican who operated from a pisé building. It is unclear from reminiscences of the hotel whether "Mother Bedourie" referred to Mary Dolan/Brodie/Craigie, her successor Rose Gaffney, or both, but one article in 1947 did identify "Mrs Bedourie" as Mary Dolan-Brodie-Craigie.

James Craigie died in 1912, and his property was transferred to Mary. Mary transferred her southwest Queensland property to pastoralist Sidney Kidman and retired in 1914 to Brisbane, dying there in 1941. Kidman had acquired a wealth of grazing properties along two major droving paths linking Adelaide and northern Australia, giving rise to his reputation as the "Cattle King". By the time he acquired the Bedourie Hotel and pisé house, he was considering retirement. Kidman installed his cattle property manager, George Gaffney, as manager of the Bedourie Hotel, and Gaffney purchased the Pisé House in 1918, with a substantial mortgage of £1375.

The hotel and Pisé House remained in the ownership and occupation of the Gaffney family and descendants (including the Clanchys and Smiths) for the next several decades. The house, known variously as the "Mud House", "Mud Hut", or "The Cottage", was the family's residence through the school year. The generator shed and timber power poles behind the house were likely added during this time; Bedourie did not receive electricity until 1970, requiring residents to install their own generators to provide power. George and Rose Gaffney ran the Bedourie Hotel until November 1948, when their eldest son Alan and his wife Mona (Smith) took over the hotel and took up residence in the pisé house. Mona's father Charlie Smith had been manager of Cluny Station and Clerk of the Diamantina Divisional Board. During the Gaffney occupation, a pedal wireless was installed to communicate with John Flynn's Flying Doctor Service. George died in 1955 and the property was transferred to Rose. The pisé house was owned by Eileen Clanchy (nee Gaffney) from 1947 until 1966 when it was owned by various members of the Smith family who lived in the house but travelled to Ethabuka station during the school holidays. The complex interrelationships of the Smiths, Gaffneys, and Clanchys meant that the place was essentially in their ownership for 56 years. A bathhouse was also added. The Royal Hotel had hot and cold running water by 1917, but in 1930 and 1947 Bedourie residents were reported as taking their daily showers at the bore.

In 1940, the Bedourie Pisé House was recognised as one of the "coolest houses in Queensland", thanks largely to its pisé construction. Postwar building material shortages sparked a revival in the construction form, which had dwindled in the 20th century, as the cost of importing building materials to western Queensland decreased. By 1911, only 61 pisé houses were identified of Queensland's 125,800 dwellings. Despite the postwar revival, however, the number of Queensland pisé houses did not significantly grow, and weather, neglect or replacement took their toll on the older pisé buildings. In 2019, only two places which include pisé construction are entered on the Queensland Heritage Register: Welford Homestead residence (1875–1881, the first section of which is pisé or arguably cob) and Irlam's Ant Bed Building (an 1890s part pisé, part antbed construction). Other 19th century pisé buildings known to exist in 2019 are: the Portland Downs homestead at Ilfracombe, central Queensland (1860s-early 1870s), the pisé men's quarters on Arrabury station, in far south-west Queensland (1880s), a pisé pavilion at Alice Downs homestead, and a pisé house on Boorara Cattle Station, near Hungerford (construction date unknown), and a pisé house Hughenden (construction date unknown). The Richmond "Mud Hut Hotel" appears to be of mud rather than rammed earth construction. Pisé construction experienced a brief revival in the mid-20th century, spurred on by postwar material shortages, but did not add significantly to the number of pisé buildings in Queensland.

Bedourie grew from the 1950s, with an airstrip, new residences, and a school constructed. The Diamantina Shire Council re-established itself in Bedourie in 1954, building a new shire hall. The Pisé House occupants departed in 1971, and the house was transferred to the Diamantina Shire Council in 1974. By 2002, the chimney and fireplace had been removed, the verandahs enclosed with corrugated iron sheets, and the house had fallen into disrepair. The council began repairs and stabilisation works on the Pisé House in 2003. In 2019, the Pisé House site also includes the generator shed and a bathhouse.

=== Aboriginal Tracker's Hut ===
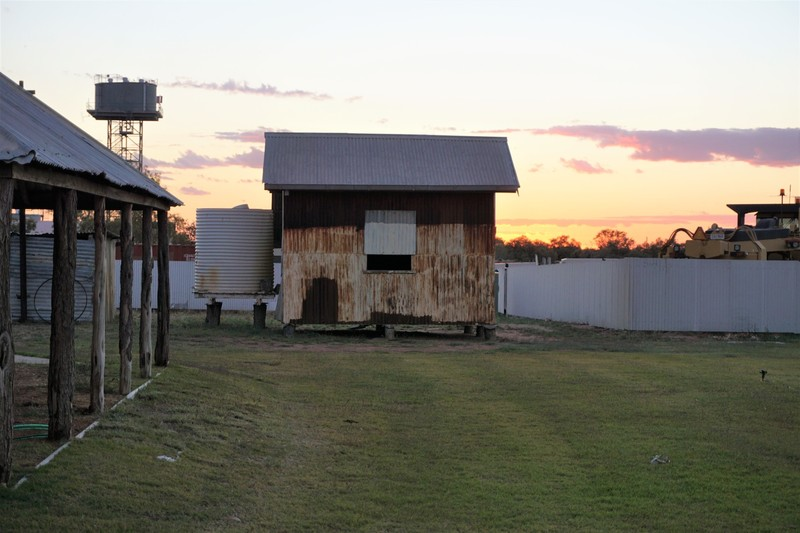
Aboriginal Tracker's Hut, 2016

Policing in the Bedourie district began in 1882 with the opening of the Eyre Creek Native Mounted Police depot. Established in 1848, the Native Mounted Police was an armed retaliatory force engaged to displace and dispossess Aboriginal people of the land that European pastoralists intended to occupy. Aboriginal people had assisted the European expeditions to the Channel Country in the 1840s and 1860s, but in the 1870s, several violent incidents occurred in the district between Boulia and the border, including spearings of Europeans and Aboriginal deaths at the hands of the Burketown Native Police.

Pastoralists called for a police force in the area, and the Native Police depot was opened at Eyre Creek, a short distance from the future town of Bedourie. The depot lasted six years, closing in 1888, and was replaced by a permanent police station in 1889. The station building, constructed c. 1890, was a simple corrugated iron-clad structure which served as the office, accommodation and courthouse. The station was staffed by two constables and two Aboriginal trackers.

Introduced to Queensland police stations from 1874, Aboriginal trackers were engaged to find missing persons, trace criminals, and search for lost or stolen stock. Their abilities allowed them to trace paths indistinguishable to Europeans, providing vital services in remote and rural areas. Trackers had become part of the police forces across Australia after first working for Europeans in the 1820s, and the skills of Queensland trackers were particularly renowned. By 1896, 112 trackers were employed across the colony, though numbers varied from year to year. Most trackers were not local to their station, and from 1900 were drawn primarily from the Fraser Island and Durundur Aboriginal settlements. If married, the tracker's wife would be employed in domestic work at the police station.

The initial police presence in Bedourie was short lived: only one tracker was recorded in Bedourie with the two constables in 1891, and all three had departed by 1893. In 1895, three police were despatched to Bedourie to re-establish the station, and a tracker was employed again by 1897. In 1900, he was one of 127 trackers engaged by the police in Queensland, the peak of tracker numbers. The new police station building was intended to be of pisé with a thatched roof, as there was no building timber within 100 miles. The police constable sourced a quote of £90 for the structure, but a one-roomed galvanised iron structure was built instead. The new Bedourie police station served the town until 1961. The tracker's role in Bedourie was largely deterrent: crime rates in the town were low, with few offences reported in the 19th and 20th centuries. The need for the station was questioned on multiple occasions, but local residents argued that the presence of a police officer and tracker discouraged crime in the remote district, and the station remained open. A series of trackers was employed at Bedourie, helping to locate a murder victim in 1908; a missing man in 1913; cattle in 1925; and a lost theatre troop in 1940.

As part of their employment, trackers were to be provided with wages, food, and accommodation. Wages were well below the average rate (and later well below the minimum wage), and food was supplied by the officer in charge of the station. No standard for accommodation was stipulated, and the accommodation provided across Queensland varied, from not being supplied, to bark huts or storage rooms within the police building, to a large brick building at Townsville. The Department of Public Works provided plans for tracker accommodation (called 'huts') at Burketown (c. 1906), Gilbert River (1908), Emerald (1917), Ingham (1927), Thursday Island (1928 and 1954), Toowoomba (1929), Almaden (1934), Cooktown (1935), and Mount Molloy (1936). None of these buildings appear to survive in 2019.

When the Bedourie tracker's position fell vacant in 1934, the police applied for the services of a new tracker. The Bedourie police horses had been transferred due to the lack of water in the area, and a tracker's service was considered "essential" in the absence of the horses. A 26 year old tracker in Boulia, Doctor Jack, indicated his willingness to take the position, and he was appointed in September 1934. Previous accommodation for the Bedourie tracker - whom a visiting police inspector in 1921 had described as "very comfortably housed" - was apparently no longer standing. So Doctor Jack constructed a humpy for himself and his wife, Norah, out of bush timber and kerosene tins, which he erected on the police reserve in Bedourie.

Doctor Jack had been recommended by the Boulia police as a "master horseman and splendid tracker". Over the next several years, his skills with animals were also recognised; and he was employed around the town on construction and repair work.

In 1945, while requesting verandah extensions to the Bedourie police station, the local constable described the conditions under which Doctor Jack had been living: ... there is absolutely no timber or iron in the present Tracker's Hut, at this Station, which would be of any use in the proposed new hut. The present hut is a humpy ... this humpy has been erected many years and is now in very bad state of repair, a lot of the kerosene tins having been blown away and the bush timber has rotted ...; There is no bucket shower at present supplied for the tracker, whenever the Tracker or his Gin [sic] desires to have a bath they are compelled to walk to the town bore, which is situated approximately half a mile from their camp."

Architectural plans for Bedourie's new Aboriginal "tracker's quarters" were drawn in 1946 by the Department of Public Works. The quarters - described in police correspondence as a "hut" - was a small, one-roomed, timber-framed building with a gable roof. It had a 9 ft (2.7m) wide earth-floored verandah on one side and its walls and roof were clad with corrugated iron sheets. It was lowset and its single room was 14 ft x 12 ft (4.2 x 3.6m) with a timber board floor and no internal wall or ceiling linings. It had a single glazed window (casements) and three other window openings, able to be closed with awning-hung shutters of corrugated iron sheets, not window sashes. The hut was built 20 yards (18m) away from the main station building, on what transpired to be land outside the Police Reserve. The hut and police station verandahs built concurrently were erected in 1947 at a cost of £1,025.

The hut was occupied for approximately eight years. In 1954, Doctor Jack, now 50 years old and with a small child to support, requested to resign to take up a better-paying position as a stockman. His request was granted in 1955, and a replacement tracker found. The new tracker, after requesting that a double bed, mattress, mosquito net, and a portable radio be purchased for the hut, resigned in 1956.

The number of trackers employed in the police service had fluctuated through the 20th century, largely for economic reasons: budget cuts (on the part of police), and the availability of better conditions and wages for stockmen (on the part of the trackers). This was also the case at Bedourie, where the tracker's position had often fallen vacant, but had eventually been refilled. However, tracker employment declined through the mid-20th century, falling to 68 by 1925, 34 by 1943 and 23 by 1958. The Bedourie tracker's position remained vacant and the hut was offered for sale in 1961. The police station, which had become inadequate for requirements, was replaced at the same time. The old galvanised iron police station building was sold to the Clanchy family and relocated to Kamaran Downs Station. The vacant tracker's hut was sold to Cedric Smith and removed to Ethabuka Station, northwest of Bedourie When a new police station was being planned in 1961, an inspection of the police reserve revealed that the trackers hut was situated in the road reserve. The police department advocated the removal of both the hut and the 1890s galvanised iron police building.

The tracker's hut remained on Ethabuka Station until the station was sold to Bush Heritage Australia in 2004. It was sold to the Diamantina Shire Council and relocated to the site of the Pisé House in 2011.

The Aboriginal Tracker's Hut survives as one of the few tracker's huts in Queensland. Other trackers' huts extant in Queensland in 2019 include Birdsville trackers' hut (built 1948), on the site of the Birdsville Courthouse, and the Normanton trackers' hut (unknown construction date), on the site of the Normanton Gaol. The Birdsville hut is similar in form and materials to the Bedourie hut, while the Normanton hut is timber-clad.

In 2019, both the Pisé House and the tracker's hut serve as part of the tourist interpretation of Bedourie.

== Description ==
The Bedourie Pisé House and Aboriginal Tracker's Hut occupies a 2,133-square-metre (22,960 sq ft) site at the south end of Herbert Street, the main street running through the small west Queensland town of Bedourie. Both are freestanding buildings. The house stands toward the front of the site facing east to the street and the tracker's hut stands at a distance behind it to the west, facing west, away from the house. A separate structure, the bathhouse and its lean-to generator shed, stands to the rear of the pisé house.

=== The Pisé House (1897) ===
The pisé house is a modest, one-storey house. Built directly onto the ground, the building has an earth floor and thick rammed-earth walls forming a rectangular core. The pisé walls are lightly bagged on both sides. It has a timber-framed hip roof clad with corrugated metal sheets, which extends beyond the core to form an encircling, earth-floored verandah with timber posts. The posts and part of the roof framing timber is rudimentary "bush timber" - timber logs and branches stripped of bark and still in the round.

The building is symmetrical and has doors on three sides (southern, eastern, and western) and a large opening on the northern side, which has replaced a fireplace and its chimney in this location. It has no windows.

The interior is a single volume, with no ceiling. A part-height timber-framed partition divides the space into two rooms of unequal size. The partition is dressed timber and is clad with ripple iron sheets.

=== Bathhouse and Generator Shed ===
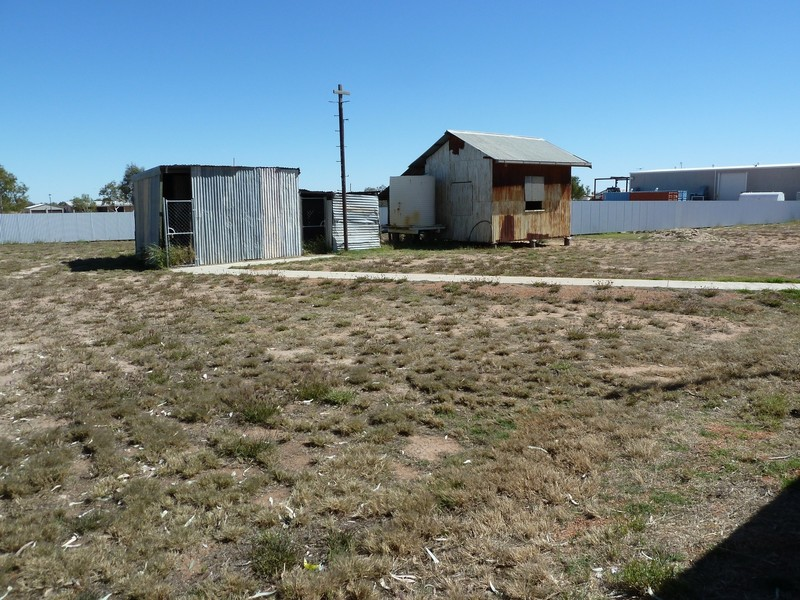
Bathhouse and Generator Shed (left) and Aboriginal Tracker's Hut (right), 2011

The Bathhouse and Generator Shed is a rudimentary, freestanding outbuilding located behind (west) of the pisé house. It is built in two parts: the bathhouse is slightly taller and the generator shed is a lower, lean-to structure. Both are built on the ground with timber-framed walls and shallow skillion roofs, all clad with corrugated metal sheets. The timber framing is basic and minimal and is a combination of bush and dressed timbers. The buildings do not have doors - their entrances face the pisé house and are simply gaps in the wall sheeting. The bathhouse has a concrete slab on ground floor and the generator shed has an earth floor.

=== The Aboriginal Tracker's Hut (1947, removed to this site 2011) ===
Standing near the north side of the Bathhouse and Generator Shed is the Aboriginal Tracker's Hut, a single-room, one-storey, timber-framed structure with a gable roof. It is low-set close to the ground on short timber stumps and the walls and roof are clad with corrugated metal sheets in short lengths. Along the length of the western side, the roof extends to form an awning supported on timber posts set into the ground.

The building has one window opening on each of its four sides. The east-facing window retains a timber-framed surround but does not retain window sashes; it is partly covered with a fixed corrugated metal sheet. The other windows, built without glazing, retain timber-framed awning shutters clad with corrugated metal sheets. It has only one door (timber boards), which faces west.

The interior is unlined on the walls and ceiling.

== Heritage listing ==
Bedourie Pisé House was listed on the Queensland Heritage Register on 31 May 2019 having satisfied the following criteria.

The place is important in demonstrating the evolution or pattern of Queensland's history.

The Bedourie Pisé House (1897) is important in demonstrating the pattern of settlement along the pastoral trading routes between South Australia and western Queensland in the late 19th century. The Pisé House, the oldest building in Bedourie, reflects the significance of Bedourie as a commercial centre for the central-western district in the late 1880s, and reflects the pattern of early European settlement in far west Queensland. The house's combination of commercial, residential and civic functions illustrates the rudimentary nature of early non-indigenous settlement in rural Queensland and the resourcefulness of its residents.

The form, materials and fabrication technique of the Pisé House are important in illustrating house construction in remote areas. It is part of the late 19th century earth and stone building tradition of central Australia and western Queensland. The structure represents a variation on the Queensland vernacular "tin and timber" construction to a more massive form, suitable for a harsh climate.

While removed from its original location, the Aboriginal Tracker's Hut (1947) is a rare surviving representative example of the standard accommodation provided for Aboriginal trackers in Queensland. It is important in demonstrating the crucial role Aboriginal trackers played in policing Queensland, particularly remote areas of western and northern Queensland in the 19th and 20th centuries.

The place demonstrates rare, uncommon or endangered aspects of Queensland's cultural heritage.

Highly intact, the Pisé House provides a rare surviving example of Pisé de terre construction, once common in central-western Queensland, where building materials were scarce. The house is one of only five known surviving 19th century Pisé buildings in Queensland.

The Aboriginal Tracker's Hut is exceptional as one of only three known surviving examples of this type of accommodation in Queensland provided for Aboriginal trackers by the Queensland Government between 1874 and the 1950s.

The place has potential to yield information that will contribute to an understanding of Queensland's history.

In its design, materials and construction, the intact Pisé House has the potential to contribute to a greater understanding of the few rare surviving 19th century examples of this built form in remote Queensland. Physical, documentary and contributory analysis could be undertaken to address research questions relating to the social and technical aspects of its construction, occupation and conservation.

The place is important in demonstrating the principal characteristics of a particular class of cultural places.

Highly intact, the Pisé House is important in demonstrating the principal characteristics of a remote 19th century Queensland house built in response to harsh conditions and restricted building resources. This includes its: freestanding, hipped roof form and single-storey scale; use of locally sourced materials for its main structure; simple, steep roof clad with corrugated metal sheets, overhanging for protective shelter; a verandah for additional outdoor living space; and simple interior amenity.

The Aboriginal Tracker's Hut is a rare surviving example and is important in demonstrating the principal characteristics of the accommodation built for Aboriginal trackers in Queensland. This includes its: small size; lone room; low-set, gable-roofed form; timber-framed, single-skin construction clad externally with no internal lining; and bare interior amenity.

The place is important because of its aesthetic significance.

The Pisé house, with its thick earth walls, simple form, verandahs on all sides and a corrugated metal-clad roof, is strikingly simple in the Bedourie town and landscape. Built using local materials, it evokes a sense of the remoteness and isolation of the central western township, while reflecting the resourcefulness of the early European settlers.

The basic size, form and materials of the Aboriginal Tracker's Hut evokes a strong response to the living and working conditions of Aboriginal trackers employed in across Queensland in the mid-20th century.

The place has a special association with the life or work of a particular person, group or organisation of importance in Queensland's history.

The Pisé House is important for its association with Mary Brodie (formerly Mary Dolan; later Mary Craigie) (c. 1858-1941), an early businesswoman in central western Queensland, who essentially founded the town of Bedourie. She funded the construction of the Pisé house, and, following a tradition of unmarried or widowed female publicans, lived and worked in the Bedourie Pisé House and associated hotel for more than twenty years, providing essential services along an important travel and trading route between Queensland and South Australia.
