= Kulumali =

Aboriginal Australian people

The Kulumali were an indigenous Australian people of the state of Queensland.

== Country ==
Norman Tindale estimated that Kulumali territory occupied some 3,500 square miles (9,100 km^{2}) centering on the area around Windorah and Kyabra Creek.

== People ==
Very little is known of the Kulumali, who were extinct by the second half of the twentieth century. The linguist Gavan Breen could ascertain nothing regarding them while undertaking research among other tribal remnants in the 1960s. The Wongkumara remembered them as having furnished that tribe with a corroboree that was new to them. It is also known that they were one of the three easternmost tribes in Queensland that undertook initiatory rites of circumcision.

== Alternative names ==
- Ngulangulanji

== Sources ==
- "AIATSIS map of Indigenous Australia". AIATSIS. 28 July 2023.
- Breen, Gavan (1971). Aboriginal languages of Western Queensland. (Monash University) 5: 1–88. Linguistic Communications. pp. 1–88.
- Breen, Gavan (1990). Salvage Studies of Western Queensland Aboriginal Languages. Pacific Linguistics. ISBN 978-0-858-83401-9.
- Tindale, Norman Barnett (1974). "Kulumali (QLD)". Aboriginal Tribes of Australia: Their Terrain, Environmental Controls, Distribution, Limits, and Proper Names. Australian National University. ISBN 978-0-708-10741-6.
