= Windorah Solar Farm =

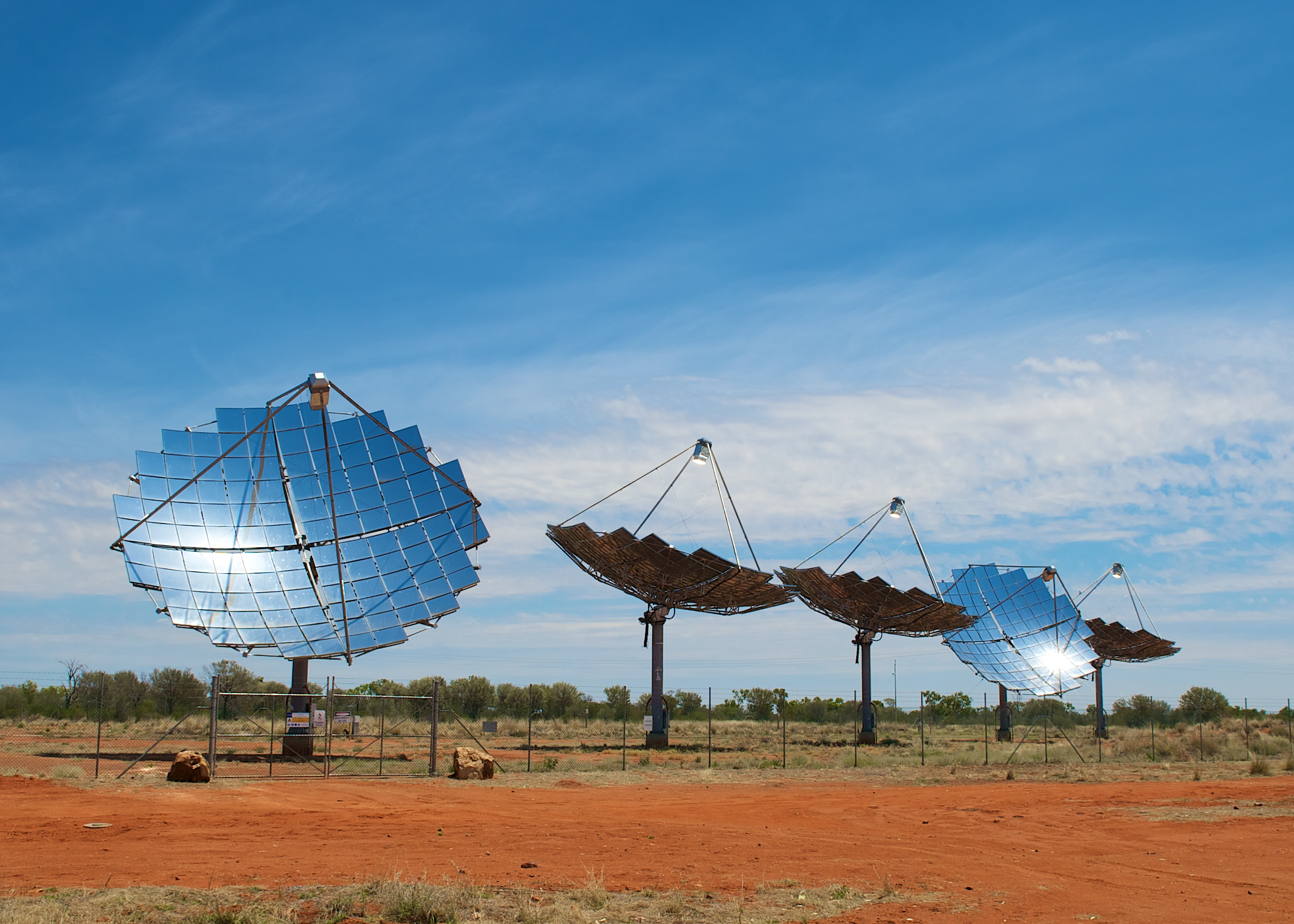
- Windorah Solar Farm's five dishes
- Country: Australia
- Location: Windorah, Queensland
- Coordinates: 25°24′50″S 142°39′38″E
- Construction began: September 2007
- Commission date: October 2009
- Decommission date: October 2023
- Construction cost: A$4,500,000
- Owner: Ergon Energy
- Operator: Ergon Energy

Solar farm
- Type: CPV

Power generation
- Units operational: 5
- Nameplate capacity: 180 KW
- Annual net output: 100,000-360,000 kWh

External links
- Website: www.ergon.com.au/community--and--our-network/network-management-and-projects/renewable-energy-sources#content-id-4964

The Windorah Solar Farm was Ergon Energy's first solar farm trial near the town of Windorah in the Shire of Barcoo, Queensland, Australia. The plant used five concentrated solar dishes or reflectors which were manufactured and installed by Solar Systems. This was expected to save up to 100,000 litres of diesel fuel per year. The integration of solar farm and diesel power was a first for Ergon Energy.

The dishes contained 112 square mirrors each measuring 1.1 m across. The five solar reflectors sat atop 13 m masts and could rotate 360°. The array was expected to produce about 180 kilowatts of electricity for up to 10 months of the year. The total cost of the project was A$4.5 million with $1 million being provided by the federal government.

The solar farm was opened in December 2008, and on sunny days was expected to supply the total daytime electricity requirements for the town of Windorah, with a population of 100. When the solar power ran low the existing diesel power station provided electricity. Not all of the dishes were used all the time. Some dishes were parked depending on the town's energy requirements.

In 2013, Ergon Energy reported that the plant was operating effectively, with environmental conditions such as dust and wildlife having some impact on the reliability of the solar farm.

In October 2023, the power station was demolished. Ergon Energy plans to build a new solar farm on the site.

== See also ==
- List of active power stations in Queensland
- Solar Cities in Australia
- Solar power in Australia
