= Ergon Energy =

Australian energy distribution utility

Ergon Energy Network
- Company type: Government-owned corporation
- Industry: Energy
- Predecessor: Various electricity boards
- Founded: 1 July 1999
- Founder: Government of Queensland
- Headquarters: Townsville, Queensland, Australia
- Area served: Queensland
- Key people: Peter Scott; Energy Queensland CEO; Sarah Zeljko; Energy Queensland Chairperson
- Products: Electricity distribution
- Revenue: A$5.289 billion (Energy Queensland 2022–23)
- Total assets: A$29.2 billion (Energy Queensland 2022–23)
- Owner: Government of Queensland
- Parent: Energy Queensland Limited
- Website: www.ergon.com.au

Ergon Energy Network is a subsidiary of Energy Queensland Limited, which is itself a Queensland Government-owned company. Ergon distributes electricity to approximately 763,000 customers across the Australian state of Queensland (excluding South East Queensland) through a distribution network which is regulated by the Australian Energy Regulator (AER). The AER set the prices that Ergon is allowed to charge for distribution.

== History ==
Ergon was formed in 1999 by the Queensland Government, from the then six regional Queensland electricity distributors and their subsidiary retailers. In 2007, the Queensland Government sold approximately 50,000 contestable electricity customers and retailer trading activities to AGL. Smaller electricity customers which are not economic continue to be billed by Ergon Energy and the electricity distribution network remains in public ownership. Ergon Energy became a subsidiary of EQL on 1 July 2016.

== Operations ==
Today the principal operating companies are Ergon Energy Corporation Limited, as the electricity distributor, and its subsidiary Ergon Energy Queensland Pty Ltd, the electricity retailer. Ergon Energy's retailer is only permitted, by legislation, to sell electricity at the Queensland Government's Notified Prices (overseen by the Queensland Competition Authority (QCA)), enabling Queenslanders to access the same uniform electricity tariffs.

The electricity generation and distribution network consists of approximately 178,000 kilometres of powerlines and one million power poles, along with associated infrastructure such as major substations and power transformers. Ergon Energy also owns and operates 33 stand-alone power stations that provide supply to communities across Queensland which are not connected to the main electricity grid. Since August 2007, Ergon Energy has owned and operated the gas-fired Barcaldine Power Station along with its associated infrastructure, which supplies power to the main grid.

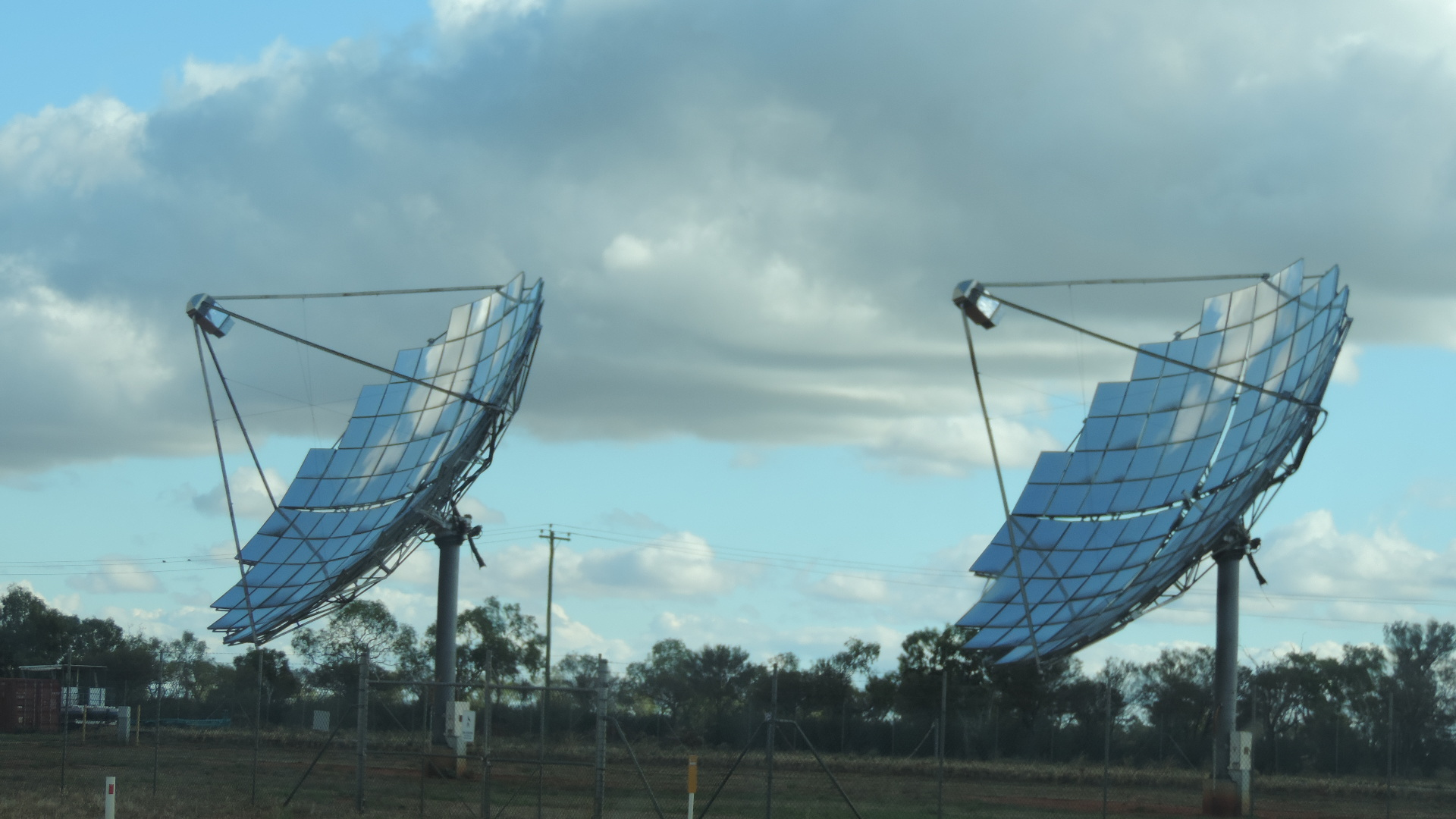
Windorah Solar Farm, 2019

In 2009, Ergon Energy established its first solar farm in Windorah. The Windorah Solar Farm provides electricity to the town of Windorah and surrounding rural areas.

In regional Queensland, retail competition is limited and most customers continue to be supplied by Ergon Energy under a standard contract. While the company has been criticised in the past for not keeping up with innovations in electricity supply such as smart meters which the state of Victoria has been acknowledged as the national leader, it is catching up with consumer-based applications that can be used to monitor energy usage in real time. Ergon Energy Retail has been a principal partner of the Royal Flying Doctor Service (Queensland Section) since 2000. Over 20 years, Ergon Energy employees and customers have donated more than $16 million towards improved emergency and routine medical care facilities throughout Queensland.

== See also ==
- National Electricity Market
