= Cooper Floodplain below Windorah =

Floodplain in Queensland, Australia

Coordinates: 25°37′25″S 142°21′35″E

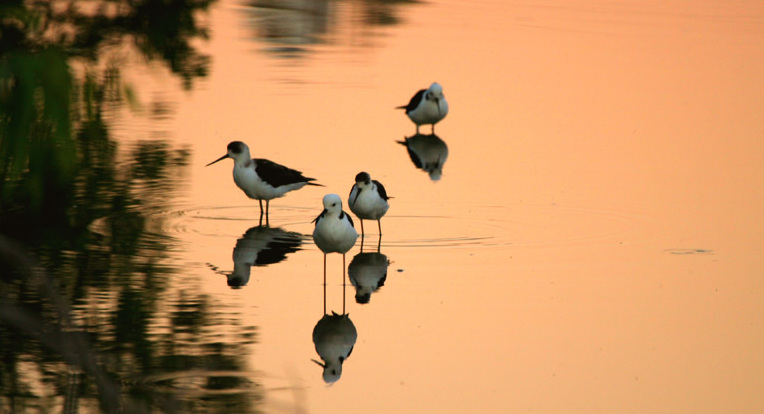
The floodplain is an important site for white-headed stilts

The Cooper Floodplain below Windorah comprises a 1741 km^{2} tract of floodplain of the Cooper Creek river system, below the town of Windorah, in the Channel Country of western Queensland, Australia. When inundated it is an important breeding site for large numbers of waterbirds.

== Description ==
The site contains the overflow floodplains and swamps associated with Cooper Creek between Windorah and Tanbar cattle stations. Major floods occur about once every five years. The floodplain lacks deep channels and is characterised by complex small-scale drainage networks that retain water for several months after flooding, so providing good waterbird habitat. Vegetation ranges from short forbs, grasses and sedges to tall tussock grass, extensive legume thickets, with bluebush, lignum and belalie swamps. The few small waterholes are fringed by lignum, belalie and coolibahs. The area has a desert climate with an average annual rainfall of about 290 mm.

== Birds ==
The floodplain has been identified as an Important Bird Area (IBA) by BirdLife International because during the 2004 floods it was estimated to support 200,000 waterbirds, including over 1% of the world populations of straw-necked and glossy ibises, and of white-headed stilts. Other waterbirds recorded on the floodplain in relatively large numbers include grey teals, pink-eared and plumed whistling ducks, whiskered terns, great egrets, royal and yellow-billed spoonbills, black-tailed native-hens and brolgas. Grey falcons, Australian bustards and Bourke's parrots have also been recorded.
