= Windorah =

- Town
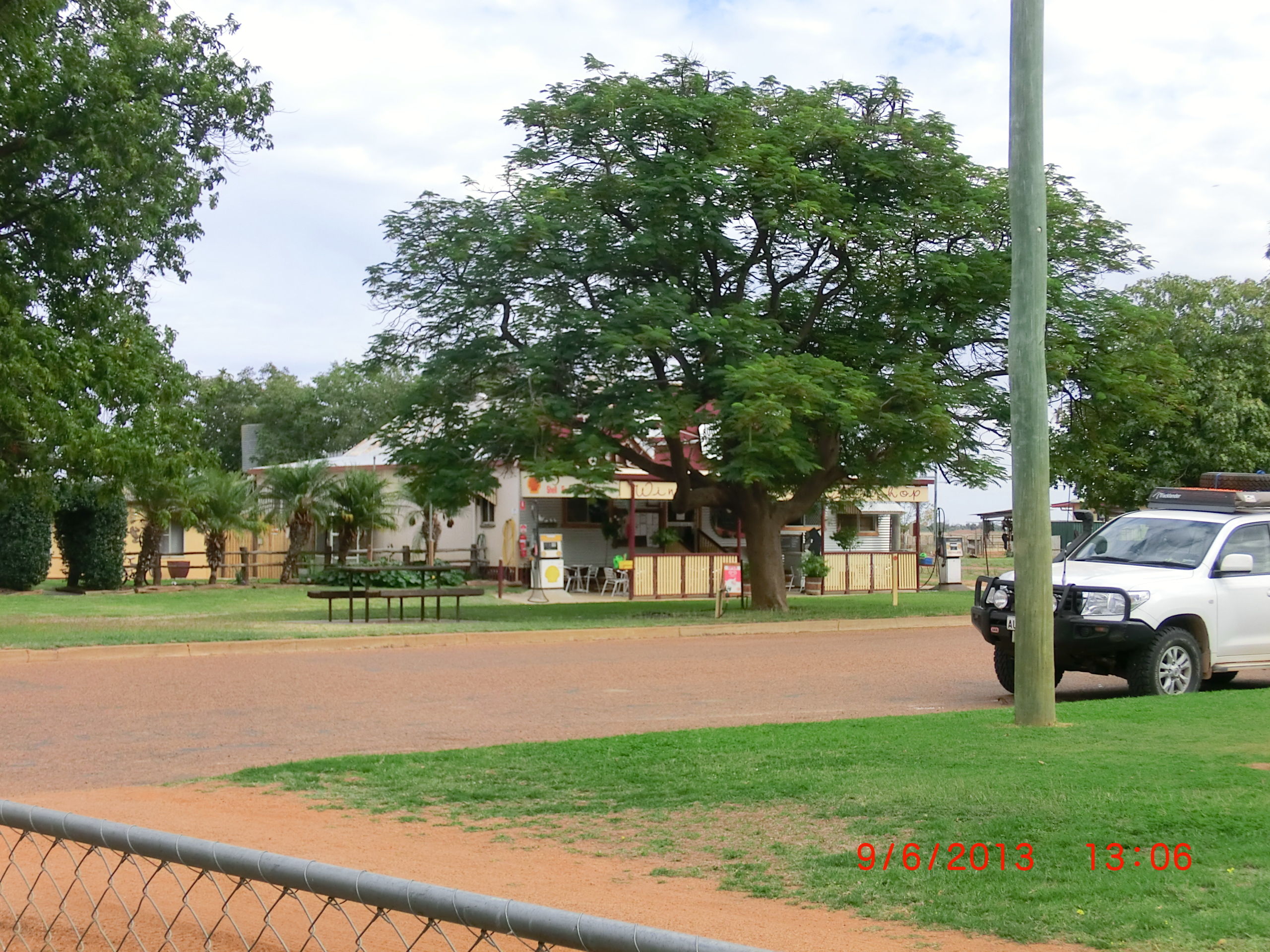
- Windorah General Store, 2013

- Interactive map of Windorah
- Coordinates: 25.4205°S 142.6544°E
- Country: Australia
- State: Queensland
- LGA: Barcoo Shire
- Location: 97.3 km (60.5 mi) SW of Jundah; 315 km (196 mi) SW of Longreach; 457 km (284 mi) NW of Charleville; 724 km (450 mi) WNW of Roma; 1,202 km (747 mi) WNW of Brisbane
- Established: 1880

Government
  - State electorate: Gregory
  - Federal division: Maranoa

Area
  - Total: 8,835.4 km^{2} (3,411.4 sq mi)
- Elevation: 126.3 m (414 ft)

Population
  - Total: 104 (2021 census)
  - Density: 0.01177/km^{2} (0.03049/sq mi)
- Time zone: UTC+10:00 (AEST)
- Postcode: 4481
- County: Grey
- Mean max temp: 30.4 °C (86.7 °F)
- Mean min temp: 15.7 °C (60.3 °F)
- Annual rainfall: 292.0 mm (11.50 in)
Localities around Windorah
Farrars Creek	Jundah	Jundah
Farrars Creek	Windorah	Eromanga
Farrars Creek	Tanbar	Eromanga

Windorah is an outback town and locality in the Shire of Barcoo, Queensland, Australia. It is one of only three towns in the Shire of Barcoo in Central West Queensland. In the 2021 census, the locality of Windorah had a population of 104 people.

== Geography ==
Located 35 kilometres (22 mi) downstream from where the Thomson and Barcoo Rivers join to form the multi-channelled Cooper Creek, the Shire covers an area of 60,901 square kilometres (23,514 sq mi).

A landscape of rocky outcrops, multiple sand hills and black soil flood plains make up most of the area surrounding the town. Water in the town follows the outback cycle of boom and bust. During a wet year Cooper Creek may flood more than a half a dozen times, during the dry it becomes a chain of waterholes. Downstream of the town stretches the Cooper Floodplain below Windorah Important Bird Area, identified as such by BirdLife International because of its importance for waterbirds when flooded.

== History ==
Before the onset of British colonisation, the area around Windorah was inhabited by the Kulumali people, who spoke the Birria (Pirriya) language. The men of this group were circumcised, cut cicatrices on their chest and had one or two of their upper central incisors removed as part of their initiation rites. They also chewed pituri as a stimulant. The population upon first contact with the British was estimated to be under 1,000 people.

The British first entered the region in August 1847 with the arrival of the expedition led by Edmund Kennedy. He encountered hundreds of Kulumali people living in the region and had several tense interactions with them over the ability to pass through their land and have access to their waterholes. Near the present town of Windorah, the situation was further inflamed with the Aboriginal people tampering with the expedition's cache of flour and by Kennedy twice attempting to force a negotiation in which he would take an Aboriginal child. A nulla nulla was thrown, and on two occasions Kennedy's men charged their horses at a group of resident Kulumali, whipping them and firing pistols above their heads to disperse them.

George Fitzwalter established a shop and a hotel in 1878 on a stock route which became the town of Stoney Point. The name was changed to Windorah in 1884. Cobb & Co once ran a stage coach service between Windorah and Adavale. It is stated that the town is named after the local Aboriginal word for "Big Fish", although according to an account of the Durack settlers, the name means high, stony place.

On 5 January 1884, police constable Nathaniel Roberts stationed at Windorah died from thirst while lost in the bush near Connemarra Station.

Windorah Provisional School opened on 30 July 1888. In 1897 it became a half-time school, sharing a teacher with Cooper's Creek Provisional School, but reverted to a full-time school in 1903. In 1907, it became a half-time school with Cooper's Creek school again, and then closed in 1915. However, it reopened in 1916, only to close again in 1918. In 1926, it reopened and remains operating as Windorah State School. It celebrated its 125th anniversary in 2013.

On 30 November 1888, police constable Thomas Joseph Callaghan died while on patrol near Whitula pastoral station when he became lost in the bush without water and died of thirst. The temperature at the time was up to118 °F (48 °C) in the shade. He was buried in an unmarked grave 40 miles (64 km) west of the town of Windorah.

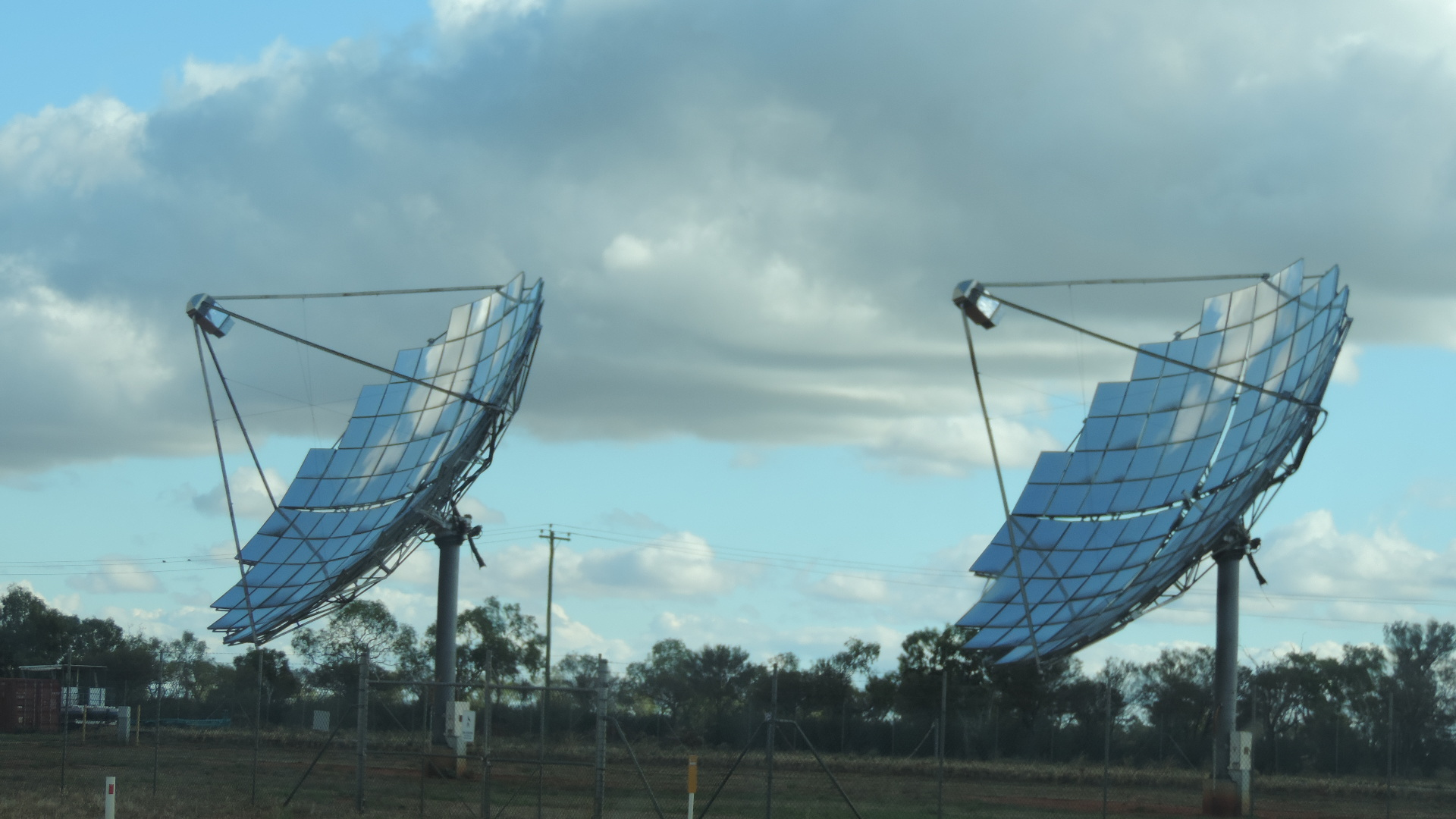
Windorah Solar Farm, 2019

The town was completely isolated by floodwater in 1949 after surrounding areas were inundated by heavy rainfall. Low cloud and more rain prevented relief food supplies from being delivered by air from a RAAF Dakota.

In 2009, Ergon Energy established its first solar farm in Windorah. The Windorah Solar Farm provided electricity to the town of Windorah and surrounding rural areas until it was decommissioned in late 2023 and replaced by the "Windorah solar farm & battery project" in 2026.

== Demographics ==
In the 2006 census, the locality of Windorah had a population of 158 people, with 11.4% identifying as Indigenous..

In the 2016 census, the locality of Windorah had a population of 115 people, with 20.5% identifying as Indigenous.

In the 2021 census, the locality of Windorah had a population of 104 people, with 19.2% identifying as Indigenous.

== Climate ==
Windorah is diverse in many aspects. The temperature may range from maximums in summer that approach 50 °C or 122 °F to minimums in winter that are below 0 °C or 32 °F. The annual rainfall has recorded falls between a low of 86 millimetres or 3.39 inches and a high of 988 millimetres or 38.90 inches. Other weather extremes include 25 morning frosts in 1977, 10 dust storms in 1987 and four hailstorms in 1985.

Climate data for Windorah Airport (1991–2020 normals, extremes 1963–2014)
Month	Jan	Feb	Mar	Apr	May	Jun	Jul	Aug	Sep	Oct	Nov	Dec	Year
Record high °C (°F)	48.0 (118.4)	45.0 (113.0)	43.0 (109.4)	39.7 (103.5)	35.7 (96.3)	33.6 (92.5)	32.0 (89.6)	38.0 (100.4)	40.7 (105.3)	44.5 (112.1)	46.6 (115.9)	47.3 (117.1)	48.0 (118.4)
Mean daily maximum °C (°F)	38.8 (101.8)	37.2 (99.0)	35.2 (95.4)	31.4 (88.5)	26.0 (78.8)	22.4 (72.3)	22.6 (72.7)	25.2 (77.4)	29.8 (85.6)	33.4 (92.1)	36.1 (97.0)	38.0 (100.4)	31.3 (88.3)
Daily mean °C (°F)	32.0 (89.6)	30.7 (87.3)	28.4 (83.1)	24.2 (75.6)	18.9 (66.0)	15.3 (59.5)	14.9 (58.8)	17.0 (62.6)	21.6 (70.9)	25.4 (77.7)	28.4 (83.1)	30.7 (87.3)	23.9 (75.0)
Mean daily minimum °C (°F)	25.1 (77.2)	24.1 (75.4)	21.5 (70.7)	17.0 (62.6)	11.8 (53.2)	8.2 (46.8)	7.2 (45.0)	8.7 (47.7)	13.5 (56.3)	17.3 (63.1)	20.7 (69.3)	23.3 (73.9)	16.5 (61.7)
Record low °C (°F)	11.1 (52.0)	13.5 (56.3)	8.0 (46.4)	4.7 (40.5)	1.2 (34.2)	−0.3 (31.5)	−1.8 (28.8)	0.1 (32.2)	2.8 (37.0)	4.6 (40.3)	7.9 (46.2)	11.2 (52.2)	−1.8 (28.8)
Average precipitation mm (inches)	49.8 (1.96)	46.7 (1.84)	48.0 (1.89)	10.3 (0.41)	13.9 (0.55)	16.2 (0.64)	11.6 (0.46)	10.7 (0.42)	10.5 (0.41)	11.7 (0.46)	30.0 (1.18)	29.4 (1.16)	288.9 (11.37)
Average precipitation days (≥ 1 mm)	3.8	3.9	2.8	1.3	1.8	1.6	1.5	1.2	1.7	2.1	4.0	3.6	29.3
Average dew point °C (°F)	13.8 (56.8)	14.3 (57.7)	12.1 (53.8)	8.3 (46.9)	6.1 (43.0)	4.8 (40.6)	2.7 (36.9)	1.0 (33.8)	2.8 (37.0)	4.4 (39.9)	7.8 (46.0)	9.9 (49.8)	7.3 (45.1)
Source 1: National Oceanic and Atmospheric Administration
Source 2: Bureau of Meteorology

== Education ==
Windorah State School is a government primary (Early Childhood–6) school for boys and girls at 8 Victoria Street (25.4202°S 142.6542°E). In 2018, the school had an enrolment of 7 students with 3 teachers (2 full-time equivalent) and 3 non-teaching staff (1 full-time equivalent). In 2022, the school had 10 students.

There are no secondary schools in Windorah, nor nearby. The alternatives are distance education and boarding school.

== Attractions ==
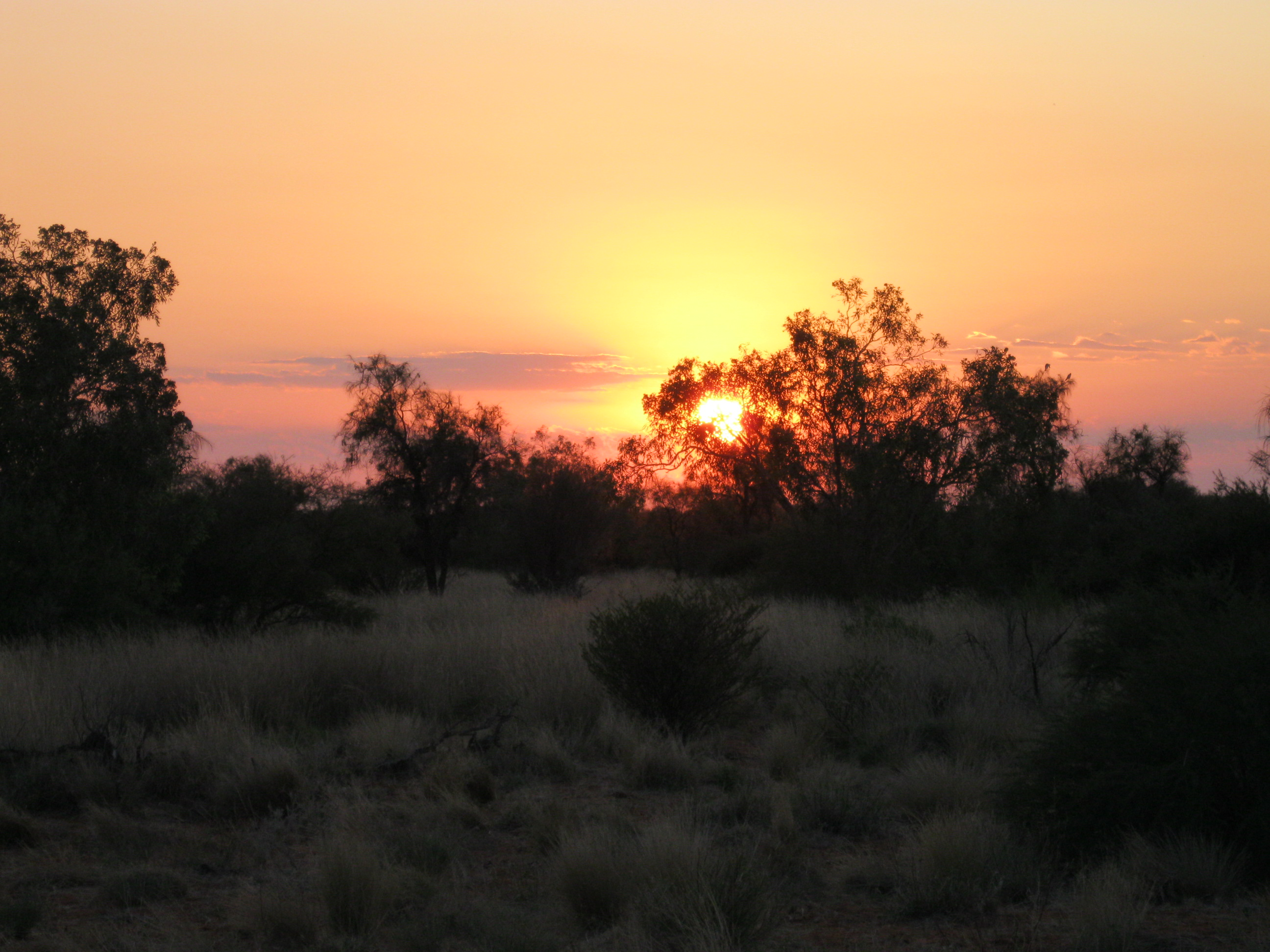
Sunrise at Windorah

Windorah has been described as "The Heart of the Channel Country".

Every year since 1998 Windorah hosts the Windorah International Yabby Races on the street outside the hotel. In each race, up to 10 yabbies are placed in the centre of a ring; the winner is the first yabby to reach the perimeter of the ring, a distance of 2 metres (6 ft 7 in). It is held on the Wednesday before the Birdsville Races (first weekend in September) to take advantage of the many people travelling through Windorah to Birdsville. The event raises money for the Royal Flying Doctor Service, community facilities and other charities.

In 2026, a 2.6-metre (8 ft 6 in) yabby statue was built from bird wire and sheet metal. It is one of many such "big things" in Australia.

== Amenities ==
The Windorah Library is operated by the Barcoo Shire Council and located in Maryborough Street.

Windorah also has a racecourse, shire hall, information centre and museum.

== Facilities ==
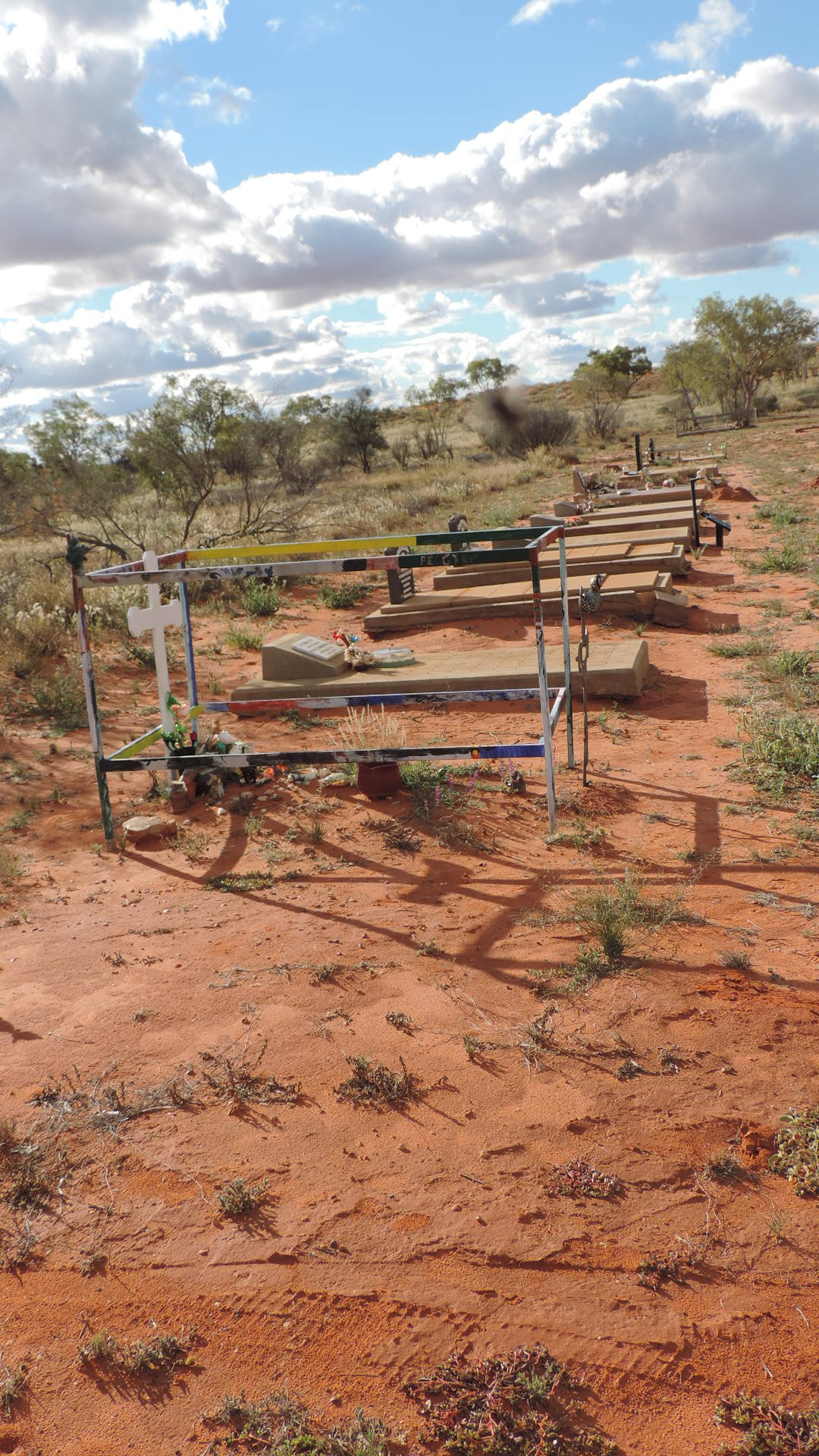
Windorah Cemetery, 2019

Windorah Primary Health Care Centre has nurses who help manage chronic conditions and provide emergency care. It is at 25 Cecil Street (25.4209°S 142.6561°E). It coordinates air ambulance transport with the Royal Flying Doctor Service.

Windorah Cemetery is managed by the Barcoo Shire Council. It is on Cecil Street to the north of the town (25.4153°S 142.6534°E).

Windorah has the following emergency services:

- Windorah Police Station on the eastern corner of Maryborough Street and Victoria Street (25.4216°S 142.6570°E)
- Windorah Ambulance Station at the health care centre (25.4209°S 142.6558°E)
- Windorah SES Facility (25.4206°S 142.6521°E)

== See also ==
- Windorah Airport
- Windorah Solar Farm
- Canterbury, a small settlement in the locality of Windorah
