= Durundur Mission =

Coordinates: 26.9447°S 152.7595°E

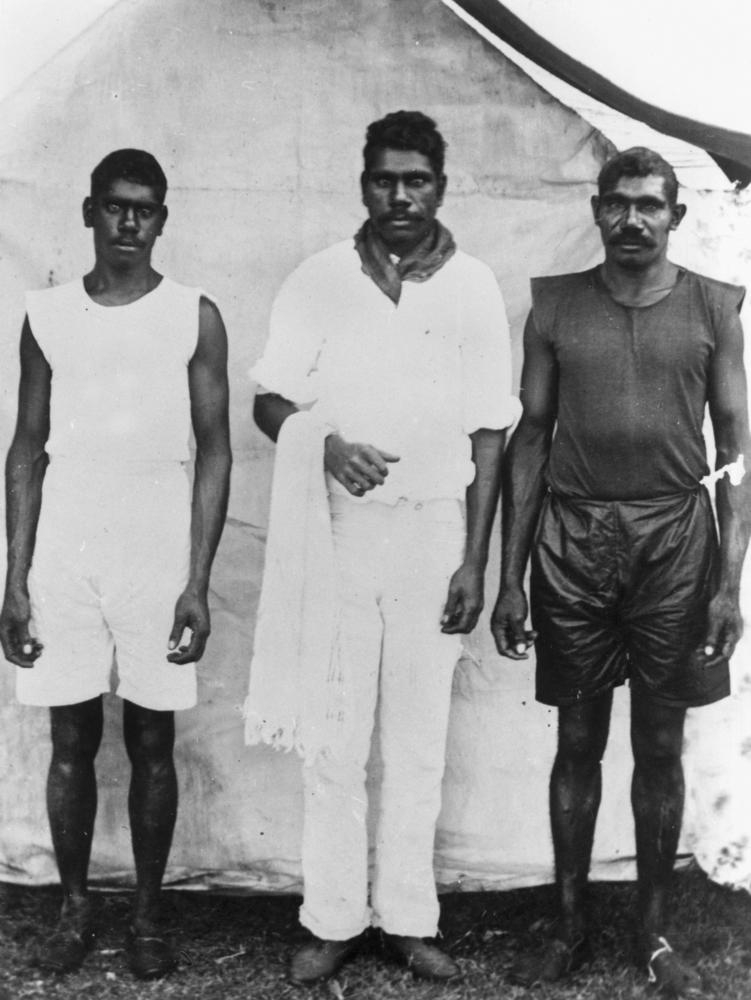
Three Aboriginal Australian men posing outside a tent, Durundur reserve, circa 1902

Durundur Mission was an Aboriginal reserve in Queensland, Australia. It operated from 1877 to 1905 in the area now known as Woodford in the City of Moreton Bay.

== Background ==
Since colonisation, Aboriginal people and Torres Strait Islander people have been subject to a range of legislative and other forms of control. Prior to the separation of Queensland from New South Wales on 10 December 1859, the Native Police were the main instrument of colonial authority and order in relation to Aboriginal people on the mainland. Torres Strait Islander people initially came under the jurisdiction of the Police Magistrate on Thursday Island, and later, for a short time, the Government Resident of the island. After separation, the administration of Indigenous affairs was transferred to the Colonial Secretary's Office for Queensland and from 1896 the Home Secretary's Office.

In 1897 the Queensland Government introduced legislation called the Aboriginals Protection and Restriction of the Sale of Opium Act 1897 (Qld). This Act created the positions of Protectors of Aboriginals, and in 1904, the Office of the Chief Protector of Aboriginals. The 1897 Act and the subsequent amending Acts of 1901, 1927, 1928 and 1934 gave the Chief Protector of Aboriginals, as well as the individual Protectors, enormous control over almost all aspects of the lives of Aboriginal and Torres Strait Islander people in Queensland.

Prior to the introduction of the Aboriginals Protection and Restriction of the Sale of Opium Act 1897 (Qld.), a number of Aboriginal and Torres Strait Islander mission stations had been established by religious organisations in Queensland and small amounts of land throughout Queensland had been gazetted as reserves for the use of Aboriginal people. With the passing of the 1897 'Protection' Act, all Aboriginal reserves became subject to the Act. For a number of these reserves Superintendents were appointed to carry out the provisions of the Act. Missionaries in charge of Aboriginal settlements also became Superintendents.

The majority of Aboriginal reserves in Queensland were never "managed" reserves; that is no Superintendent was appointed. Unmanaged reserves were usually controlled by the Local Protector of Aborigines.

== Mission at Durundur ==
In March 1877, 3,000 acres (1,200 ha) of land were gazetted as an Aboriginal reserve in the parish of Durundur near Monkeybong Creek. At that time more than two hundred Aboriginal people were camped there under the supervision of the Rev Duncan McNab. In 1878 an amendment to the original notice was made noting the size of the reserve as 2,130 acres (860 ha).

In January 1905, the Queensland Government decided to close Durundur Mission. It was closed on 1 March 1905 and the remaining inmates transferred to Barambah Mission. 61 people were forced to walk to Barambah, with the remaining 115 inmates taken by train.
