= Normanton Gaol =

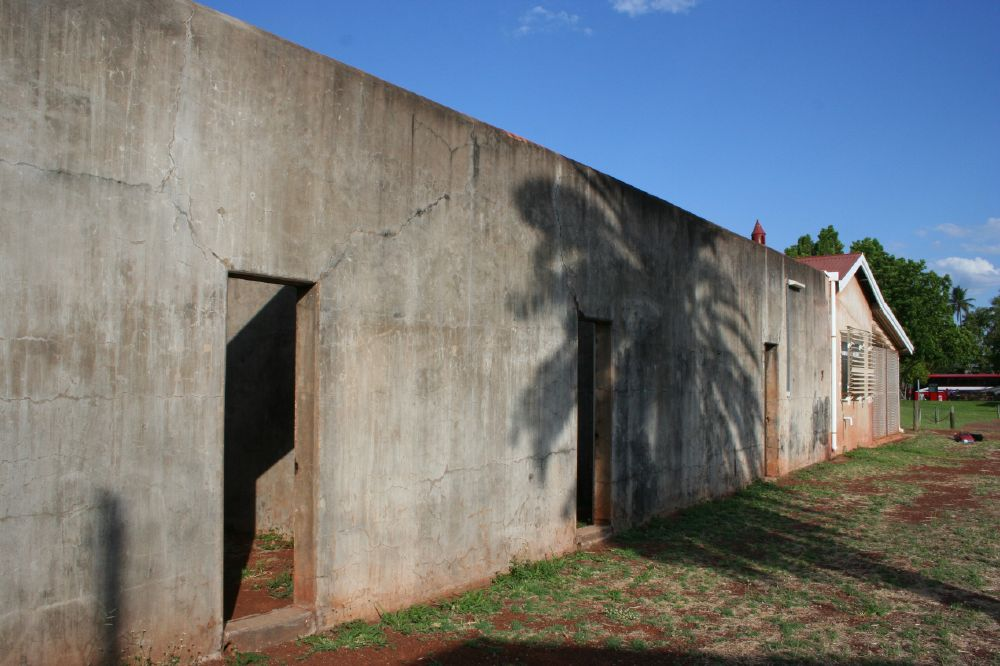
- Normanton Gaol, 2010

- Location within Queensland Location within Australia
- 17.6682°S 141.0799°E
- Location: 27 Haigh Street, Normanton, Shire of Carpentaria, Queensland, Australia

History
- Design period: 1870s–1890s (late 19th century)
- Built: 1892–1899

Site notes
- Architect: William Taylor Jack

Queensland Heritage Register
- Official name: Normanton Gaol
- Type: state heritage (built)
- Designated: 23 July 1999
- Reference no.: 601501
- Significant period: 1890s (historical); 1890s (fabric); 1892–1992 (social)
- Significant components: residential accommodation – trackers' quarters, cell block
- Builders: Queensland Department of Public Works

Normanton Gaol is a heritage-listed former prison at 27 Haigh Street, Normanton, Shire of Carpentaria, Queensland, Australia. It was designed by William Taylor Jack and built from 1892 to 1899 by the Department of Public Works. It was added to the Queensland Heritage Register on 23 July 1999.

== History ==
The Normanton Gaol is a complex of two buildings, consisting of a single-storeyed cement and corrugated iron cell block constructed between 1892 and 1899, and a smaller timber and corrugated iron building formerly used as the trackers quarters.

Normanton, gazetted as a town in 1868, was originally settled to provide port facilities as an alternative to the Burketown port. The port facilities, situated sixty kilometres upstream from the Gulf of Carpentaria provided access for incoming goods as well as allowing for a more efficient trade route to Brisbane from the Carpentaria region. The site for Normanton is located on an ironstone ridge, protecting it from the topographic changes that occur during the wet season. Although the region had been opened up as a pastoral district during the 1860s for cattle, it was the discovery of gold at Croydon in 1885, that saw the township boom. The Normanton–Croydon railway opened in 1891 and road links to the Cloncurry copper fields saw Normanton port become a gateway for the north-western region of Queensland.

From the earliest days of the township, an important element in the Normanton community was the variety of cultures that were evident. As well as the pioneering European settlers, in themselves a diverse cultural group, a significant minority of Chinese immigrants were attracted to the area through the Croydon goldfields. Fringe camps of Aboriginal peoples, originally located on the northern side of the Norman River, developed into large groups by the turn of the century. Some of these peoples were removed to reserves on Mornington Island in 1914 and Doomadgee in 1936. Fringe camps endured and were similar in character to those found in other townships of the Gulf region.

In 1888 Normanton became the central town of the police district and therefore the court district. On 25 November 1890 The Prisons Act assented with the aim to consolidate and amend the law relating to gaols, prisons, houses of correction and penal establishments. This Act created a prisons department under the control of the Comptroller General and clarified the distinction between a Police Gaol, being a specially proclaimed lock-up or watch house, and a prison. As a result of this Act Normanton was initially proclaimed a Police Goal in 1891, possibly as an interim measure until the construction on the larger site could be undertaken. In 1890 a gaol reserve of nine acres was proclaimed on the outskirts of town adjacent to the hospital reserve. Plans were drawn up for the Gaol reserve by William Taylor Jack who was working in Normanton as the Foreman of Works for the Department of Public Works at the time. These plans incorporated warder's residence and a total of twenty four cells.

The gaol was eventually built on an unproclaimed reserve in Borck street (now Haig street) and was a far more modest four cells. The Police Gaol proclamation was rescinded in 1893 when it was proclaimed a prison. The deferment of the status of prison is an indication of the stature of Normanton amongst townships in the Carpentaria Gulf region. Locating the gaol in the centre of town maintained a close proximity between the gaol, police reserve and the Court House. The location allowed Normanton Gaol to be used as both a police lockup and a district gaol. This meant that prisoners on both short and long term sentences were held together with those awaiting trial. It was part of a larger police reserve that encompassed barracks, conjoining the Gaol, stables and horse yards with offices and inspectors residence on the opposite side of Haig Street.

In a township dominated by timber and corrugated iron built form, the gaol is distinct as an early concrete structure. The gaol incorporates the distinctive use of iron railway rails in the construction of the walls and frames for the ceilings. This was incorporated as reinforcing device as well as using materials available due to the recent construction of the Normanton-Croydon railway. Praised by the Sheriff for accommodating the harsh climate of the Gulf, the concrete structure also deterred white ants that plagued timber buildings at this time. The ground floor construction of the building impeded potential breakout from the gaol experienced in the previous timber building where an inmate broke through the floor and escaped. The configuration of yards and cells isolated prisoners and separated those remanded from those carrying out longer sentencing.

As a district gaol, Normanton serviced Croydon, Georgetown, Cloncurry, and Burketown, encompassing the large district of Cook and Burke. The gaol was extended in 1895, as a result of overcrowding with as many as twenty four prisoners held in the original four cells. A further two cells were added, along with a new kitchen and a stockade fence around the perimeter. A seventh cell was added into the 1895 range in 1899. The superintendent of the prison was drawn from the resident police officers, and paid a supplementary stipend of £20 per annum. Similarly the local Protector of Aborigines, appointed after the enactment of the Aboriginal Protection and Restriction of the Sale of Opium Act 1897, was drawn from Normanton's senior police ranks.

Trackers' quarters are located in the eastern corner of the block and are a small two room weatherboard hut. Aboriginal trackers were retained by the police force to assist with the capture of errant prisoners and recalcitrants. They were also used to find lost children and were highly prized for their bushcraft skills. In addition to such duties, aboriginal trackers also acted as subordinate staff, attending to such jobs as stable hand, cleaner and handy man. The location and size of the hut are indicative of the hierarchy in police accommodation, with aboriginal peoples on the lowest position, in the smallest building with the least amenities. The trackers' quarters is more akin to the cell blocks than to the accommodation for constables and inspectors.

After its closure as a gaol in 1945, it reverted to the police service and continued to be used as a watch house until late 1992. Recommendations arising from the 1991 Royal Commission into Aboriginal Deaths in Custody saw the watch house fail to comply to Queensland Police Service operational requirements and it was subsequently closed.

== Description ==
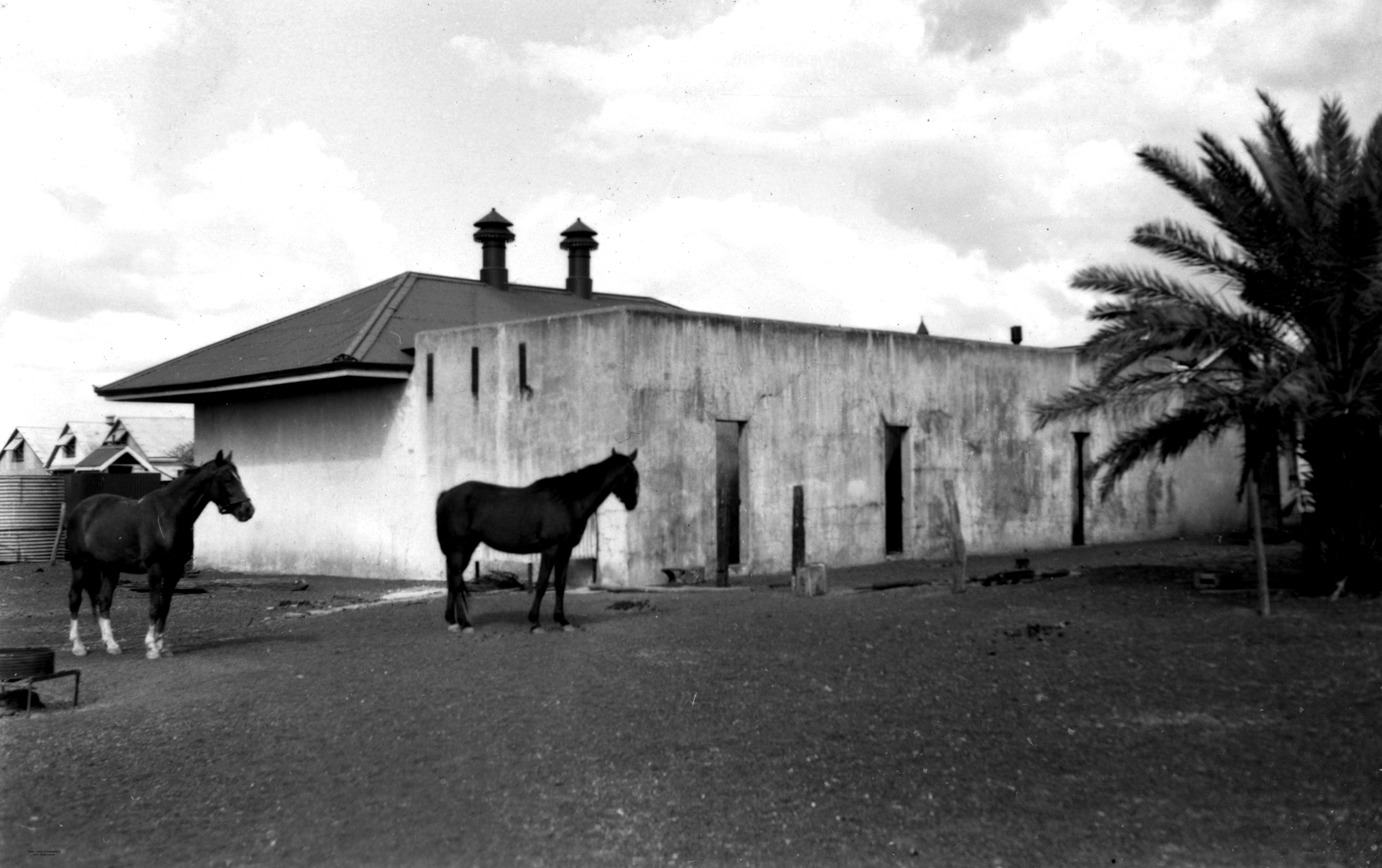
Normanton gaol, 1953

Normanton Gaol is located on a rectangular block bounded by Haig Street, and three residential blocks. It is a single-storeyed concrete and corrugated iron building with multiple entrance points, each indicating a cell or group of cells. The smaller tracker's quarters, a single storeyed timber and corrugated iron building is located in the north eastern corner of the block behind the gaol building.

The 1892 core of the building incorporates two large cells, each with an exercise yard and two smaller cells with a single L-shaped yard. Exercise yards are enclosed by concrete walls, three and a half metres in height. Each of the yards is separately entranced by iron doors with peep holes and large draw bolt locks. In each of the four 1892 cells, railway iron rails are imbedded horizontally in concrete piers between the top of the external walls and the ceiling, providing ventilation. The remand cell has railway iron rails spanning the room at the top of the walls spaced 25 centimetres (9.8 in) apart, the ends being imbedded into the walls. The ceilings are lined with tongue and groove hardwood boards.

The 1895 extension, consisting of three cells adjoins the original exercise yard wall. A fourth cell was added to the 1895 range in 1899 and is of congruous design and form. Three of the cells are four metres by two metres, and are unadorned and without windows. The north eastern cell has a second doorway leading to the L-shaped exercise yard. The south western cell is larger and has a set of louvred windows facing Haig Street. A shower block extension, including two bathrooms and open plan thoroughfare, was added to the western elevation of the building and is made of besser brick and open iron bars covered with security mesh.

The 1892 core has a hipped skillion roof, clad with galvanised iron. Small bull nose roofs extend from the main roof along the exercise yard walls. Earth closets, once located under these extensions, have been removed. Two ornate finials ventilate the roof and indicate the cell spaces. The 1895/99 addition has a pitched roof which was extended over the modern addition. Three smaller finials are located on the ridge of this roof.

The trackers' quarters, located at the north eastern corner of the block, at the rear of the main building, is a simple single-storeyed weatherboard and corrugated iron structure. It has two single rooms, each with an entrance and exit door and a double hung sash window in each room. The hipped roof provides an awning for a covered porch area. A toilet and shower facility are located in this area.

== Heritage listing ==
Normanton Gaol was listed on the Queensland Heritage Register on 23 July 1999 having satisfied the following criteria.

The place is important in demonstrating the evolution or pattern of Queensland's history.

The Normanton Gaol is a complex of two buildings, consisting of a single-storeyed concrete and corrugated iron cell block constructed between 1892 and 1899, and a small timber and corrugated iron building formerly used as the trackers' quarters. The placement of the gaol in Normanton is indicative of governmental confidence in the growth in this area, in both mining and pastoral sectors and the need to provide for law and order in conjunction with the other services, such as port and Post and Telegraph facilities. The gaol building demonstrates the importance of Normanton as a central administrative hub for the Carpentaria region at a time of rapid economic growth.

The place demonstrates rare, uncommon or endangered aspects of Queensland's cultural heritage.

It is a rare and intact example of a nineteenth-century gaol used to service a remote regional area, once part of a broader network of prisons throughout Queensland administered under the Prisons Act 1890. As such it demonstrates the range of penal institutions developed within the network that included small cell blocks through to large complexes as can be seen at Boggo Road Gaol, Brisbane (Boggo Road Gaol). Gaols once featured in the urban landscapes of regional centres such as Roma, Toowoomba, Cooktown and Thursday Island, most of which no longer survive. The substantial concrete form of the gaol building demonstrates the distinction made between a lock-up and a prison, illustrating attitude to prison construction.

The place is important in demonstrating the principal characteristics of a particular class of cultural places.

The small two room trackers' quarters, the only remaining building of a larger police reserve, demonstrates the hierarchal social structure attached to accommodation in the Queensland Police Service. It also demonstrates the use of indigenous peoples in the Queensland Police Service.

The place has a strong or special association with a particular community or cultural group for social, cultural or spiritual reasons.

Normanton Gaol has association with the peoples of the Gulf region as a place of incarceration and punishment from the late nineteenth century.
