= Canterbury, Queensland =

Canterbury
- Town
- Coordinates: 25°21′00″S 141°52′59″E
- Country: Australia
- State: Queensland
- Region: Central West Queensland
- LGA: Shire of Barcoo
- Location: 86.9 km (54.0 mi) W of Windorah; 184 km (114 mi) SW of Jundah; 402 km (250 mi) SW of Longreach; 522 km (324 mi) WNW of Charleville; 1,289 km (801 mi) WNW of Brisbane

Government
  - State electorate: Gregory
  - Federal division: Maranoa
- Postcode: 4481

Canterbury is a small abandoned settlement in the locality of Windorah in Shire of Barcoo in Central West Queensland, Australia. The JC Hotel Ruins are located at this site.

== Geography ==
Canterbury's closest neighbour is Morney which is also the name of its closest river. It is located on the Diamantina Developmental Road.

== History ==
In the late 1860s, pastoralist John Costello set up camp at a waterhole in the area and carved his initials in a nearby tree. The place afterwards was known as JC Waterhole. By the 1870s it had become the headquarters of the Native Police detachment in the region under Sub-Inspector William Gough. In the early 1880s the JC Hotel was established and in 1884 the settlement was renamed Canterbury.

Canterbury Post Office opened on 1 January 1891 (a receiving office had been open from 1888) and closed in 1920.
